= Glider types =

This list includes any types which had 10 or more aircraft built or types which are important to glider development. All the gliders in this list can be found in the J2MCL web site with individual pages for each type. This list does not include Motor glider types. (N.B. Some specifications are quoted with the wrong units!!)

Sortable List Of Significant Glider types
| Model | Manufacturer / Designer | Origin | Image | Year | Class | Seats | Span | A/R | L/D | VL/D_{max} | Min sink | Vne | Empty | Maximum | Built |
|---|---|---|---|---|---|---|---|---|---|---|---|---|---|---|---|
| Air 100 | Arsenal | (France) | | 1947 | | 1 | 18 m (59 ft) | 18 | 30:1 | 64 km/h (40 mph; 35 kn) | 0.6 m/s (1.2 kn) | 220 km/h (140 mph; 120 kn) | 284 kg (626 lb) | 374 kg (825 lb) | 43 |
| Arcus | Schempp-Hirth | (Germany) | | 2009 | Two Seater | 2 | 20 m (66 ft) | 25.7 | 50:1 | | 0.56 m/s (1.1 kn) | 280 km/h (170 mph; 150 kn) | 430 kg (950 lb) | 800 kg (1,800 lb) | |
| ASG 29 | Schleicher | (Germany) | | 2005 | 15 meter 18 meter | 1 | 15 or 18 m (49 or 59 ft) | 30.4 | 52:1 | | 0.47 m/s (0.9 kn) | 270 km/h (170 mph; 150 kn) | 280 kg (620 lb) | 600 kg (1,300 lb) | 246+ |
| ASG 32 | Schleicher | (Germany) | | 2014 | Two Seater | 2 | 20 m (66 ft) | 25.5 | | | 0.6 m/s (1.2 kn) | 280 km/h (170 mph; 150 kn) | 490 kg (1,080 lb) | 850 kg (1,870 lb) | |
| ASH 25 | Schleicher | (Germany) | | 1996 | Dual | 2 | 25.6 m (84 ft) | 39.8 | 60:1 | | 0.42 m/s (0.8 kn) | 280 km/h (170 mph; 150 kn) | 478 kg (1,054 lb) | 750 kg (1,650 lb) | 260+ |
| ASH 26 | Schleicher | (Germany) | | 1996 | 18 meter | 1 | 18 m (59 ft) | 27.7 | 50:1 | | 0.48 m/s (0.9 kn) | 270 km/h (170 mph; 150 kn) | 360 kg (790 lb) | 525 kg (1,157 lb) | 234 |
| ASH 31 | Schleicher | (Germany) | | 2009 | Open | 1 | 18m or 21m | 33.5 | 56:1 | | | | 435 kg (959 lb) | 700 kg (1,500 lb) | 100+ |
| ASK 13 | Schleicher | (Germany) | | 1966 | Dual | 2 | 16m | 14.6 | 27:1 | 90 km/h (56 mph; 49 kn) | 0.8 m/s (1.6 kn) | 200 km/h (120 mph; 110 kn) | 295 kg (650 lb) | 480 kg (1,060 lb) | 700+ |
| ASK 21 | Schleicher | (Germany) | | 1979 | Dual | 2 | 17 m (56 ft) | 16.1 | 34:1 | | 0.64 m/s (1.2 kn) | 280 km/h (170 mph; 150 kn) | 360 kg (790 lb) | 600 kg (1,300 lb) | 900+ |
| ASK 23 | Schleicher | (Germany) | | 1983 | Club | 1 | 15 m (49 ft) | 17.4 | 34:1 | 80 km/h (50 mph; 43 kn) | 0.62 m/s (1.2 kn) | 220 km/h (140 mph; 120 kn) | 230 kg (510 lb) | 380 kg (840 lb) | 153 |
| Astir | Grob | (Germany) | | 1975 | Standard Class | 1 | 15 m (49 ft) | 18.2 | 38:1 | 93 km/h (58 mph; 50 kn) | 0.7 m/s (1.4 kn) | 250 km/h (160 mph; 130 kn) | 250 kg (550 lb) | 450 kg (990 lb) | 1240+ |
| ASW 12 | Schleicher | (Germany) | | 1965 | Open | 1 | 18.3 m (60 ft) | 25.8 | 46:1 | | 0.49 m/s (1.0 kn) | 200 km/h (120 mph; 110 kn) | 276 kg (608 lb) | 400 kg (880 lb) | 15 |
| ASW 15 | Schleicher | (Germany) | | 1968 | Standard | 1 | 15 m (49 ft) | 20.45 | 38:1 | 89 km/h (55 mph; 48 kn) | 0.59 m/s (1.1 kn) | 220 km/h (140 mph; 120 kn) | 250 kg (550 lb) | 408 kg (899 lb) | 449 |
| ASW 17 | Schleicher | (Germany) | | 1971 | Open | 1 | 20 m (66 ft) | 27 | 48:1 | | 0.49 m/s (1.0 kn) | 250 km/h (160 mph; 130 kn) | 415 kg (915 lb) | 610 kg (1,340 lb) | 55 |
| ASW 19 | Schleicher | (Germany) | | 1975 | Standard | 1 | 15 m (49 ft) | 20 | 38:1 | | 0.7 m/s (1.4 kn) | 250 km/h (160 mph; 130 kn) | 245 kg (540 lb) | 454 kg (1,001 lb) | 425 |
| ASW 20 | Schleicher | (Germany) | | 1977 | 15 meter | 1 | 15 m (49 ft) | 21.4 | 42.5:1 | 120 km/h (75 mph; 65 kn) | 0.59 m/s (1.1 kn) | 280 km/h (170 mph; 150 kn) | 260 kg (570 lb) | 525 kg (1,157 lb) | 905 |
| ASW 22 | Schleicher | (Germany) | | 1981 | Open | 1 | 26.6m26.6 m (87.3 ft) | 38.3 | 62:1 | 95 km/h (59 mph; 51 kn) | 0.41 m/s (0.8 kn) | 280 km/h280 km/h (170 mph; 150 kn) | 465 kg (1,025 lb) | 1,023 kg (2,255 lb) | 87 |
| ASW 24 | Schleicher | (Germany) | | 1987 | Standard | 1 | 15 m (49 ft) | 22.5 | 43:1 | | 0.58 m/s (1.1 kn) | 270 km/h (170 mph; 150 kn) | 230 kg (510 lb) | 500 kg (1,100 lb) | 249 |
| ASW 27 | Schleicher | (Germany) | | 1997 | 15m Class | 1 | 15 m (49 ft) | 25 | 48:1 | | 0.58 m/s (1.1 kn) | 285 km/h (177 mph; 154 kn) | 245 kg (540 lb) | 500 kg (1,100 lb) | 237+ |
| ASW 28 | Schleicher | (Germany) | | 2000 | Standard | 1 | 15 m (49 ft) | 21.4 | 45:1 | | 0.56 m/s (1.1 kn) | 270 km/h (170 mph; 150 kn) | 240 kg (530 lb) | 525 kg (1,157 lb) | 144 |
| B-4 | Pilatus | (Switzerland) | | 1966 | Standard | 1 | 15 m (49 ft) | 16 | 35:1 | | 0.63 m/s (1.2 kn) | 240 km/h (150 mph; 130 kn) | 230 kg (510 lb) | 350 kg (770 lb) | 322 |
| Baby Albatross | Bowlus | (United States) | | 1937 | Homebuilt | 1 | 13.6 m (45 ft) | 13.2 | 20:1 | | 0.69 m/s (1.3 kn) | | 136 kg (300 lb) | 229 kg (505 lb) | 156 kits sold |
| Bergfalke | Scheibe | (Germany) | | 1951 | Trainer | 2 | 16.6 m (54 ft) | 15.6 | 28:1 | 80 km/h (50 mph; 43 kn) | 0.72 m/s (1.4 kn) | 160 km/h (99 mph; 86 kn) | 246 kg (542 lb) | 440 kg (970 lb) | 320+ |
| BG-6 | Briegleb | (United States) | | 1939 | | 1 | 9.86 m (32.3 ft) | 8.9 | 16:1 | 64 km/h (40 mph; 35 kn) | 0.91 m/s (1.8 kn) | | 107 kg (236 lb) | 193 kg (425 lb) | 10 |
| BG-12 | Briegleb | (United States) | | 1956 | Homebuilt | 1 | 15.2 m (50 ft) | 17.7 | 34:1 | 90 km/h (56 mph; 49 kn) | 0.7 m/s (1.4 kn) | 217 km/h (135 mph; 117 kn) | 227 kg (500 lb) | 409 kg (902 lb) | 350 kits |
| Blanik | LET | (Czechoslovakia) | | 1956 | Dual | 2 | 16.2 m (53 ft) | 13.7 | 28:1 | 90 km/h (56 mph; 49 kn) | 0.84 m/s (1.6 kn) | 240 km/h (150 mph; 130 kn) | 292 kg (644 lb) | 500 kg (1,100 lb) | 3000+ |
| Br 901 Mouette | Bréguet | (France) | | 1954 | | 1 | 17.3 m (57 ft) | 20 | 35:1 | 85 km/h (53 mph; 46 kn) | 0.6 m/s (1.2 kn) | 220 km/h (140 mph; 120 kn) | 265 kg (584 lb) | 430 kg (950 lb) | 36 |
| Br 904 Nymphale | Bréguet | (France) | | 1956 | Dual | 2 | 20.4 m (67 ft) | 20 | 35:1 | 70 km/h (43 mph; 38 kn) | 0.7 m/s (1.4 kn) | | 220 kg (490 lb) | 340 kg (750 lb) | 18 |
| BS-1 | Glasflügel | (Germany) | | 1962 | Open | 1 | 18 m (59 ft) | 23.1 | 44:1 | 84 km/h (52 mph; 45 kn) | 0.54 m/s (1.0 kn) | | 310 kg (680 lb) | 450 kg (990 lb) | 20 |
| Concept 70 | Berkshire | (United States) | | 1971 | 15 meter | 1 | 15 m (49 ft) | 18.3 | 39:1 | | | | 249 kg (549 lb) | 397 kg (875 lb) | 21 |
| Cirrus Open | Schempp-Hirth | (Germany) | | 1967 | Open | 1 | 17.7 m (58 ft) | 24.9 | 44:1 | 85 km/h (53 mph; 46 kn) | 0.50 m/s (1.0 kn) | 250 km/h (160 mph; 130 kn) | 276 kg (608 lb) | 400 kg (880 lb) | 183 |
| Cirrus Standard | Schempp-Hirth | (Germany) | | 1969 | Standard | 1 | 15 m (49 ft) | 22.5 | 38.5 | | 0.6 m/s (1.2 kn) | 220 km/h (120 kn; 140 mph) | 215 kg (474 lb) | 390 kg (860 lb) | 838 |
| Kranich | DFS | (Germany) | | 1935 | Trainer | 2 | 18 m (59 ft) | 15.5 | 30:1 | 80 km/h (50 mph; 43 kn) | 0.7 m/s | 175 km/h (109 mph; 94 kn) | 185 kg (408 lb) | 350 kg (770 lb) | 100+ |
| Meise | DFS | (Germany) | | 1940 | Olympic | 1 | 15 m (49 ft) | 15 | 25:1 | 66 km/h (41 mph; 36 kn) | 0.7 m/s (1.4 kn) | 220 km/h (140 mph; 120 kn) | 165 kg (364 lb) | 290 kg (640 lb) | 952+ |
| Reiher | DFS | (Germany) | | 1937 | Performance | 1 | 19 m (62 ft) | 18.85 | 33:1 | | 0.5 m/s (1.0 kn) | 200 km/h (120 mph; 110 kn) | 230 kg (510 lb) | 315 kg (694 lb) | 7+ |
| Rhönsperber | DFS | (Germany) | | 1935 | Performance | 1 | 1} | | 20:1 | | s0.72 m/s (1.4 kn) | 200 km/h (120 mph; 110 kn) | 162 kg (357 lb) | 255 kg (562 lb) | 100 |
| Weihe | DFS | (Germany) | | 1938 | Performance | 1 | 18 m (59 ft) | 17.46 | 29:1 | 76 km/h (47 mph; 41 kn) | 0.61 m/s (1.2 kn) | 170 km/h (110 mph; 92 kn) | 215 kg (474 lb) | 335 kg (739 lb) | 400+ |
| DG-100 | Glaser-Dirks | (Germany) | | 1974 | Standard | 1 | 15 m (49 ft) | 20.5 | 37:1 | 91 km/h (57 mph; 49 kn) | 0.95 m/s (1.8 kn) | 266 km/h (165 mph; 144 kn) | 230 kg (510 lb) | 418 kg (922 lb) | 327 |
| DG-200 | Glaser-Dirks | (Germany) | | 1977 | 15 meter | 1 | 15 m (49 ft) | 22.5 | 42:1 | | 0.59 m/s (1.1 kn) | 270 km/h (170 mph; 150 kn) | 238 kg (525 lb) | 450 kg (990 lb) | 192 |
| DG-300 | DG | (Germany) | | 1983 | Standard | 1 | 15 m (49 ft) | 21.9 | 40:1 | | 0.59 m/s (1.1 kn) | 270 km/h (170 mph; 150 kn) | 238 kg (525 lb) | 500 kg (1,100 lb) | 511 |
| DG-800 | DG | (Germany) | | 1993 | Self launch | 1 | 18 m (59 ft) | 27.4 | 50:1 | | 0.5 m/s (1.0 kn) | 270 km/h (170 mph; 150 kn) | 344 kg (758 lb) | 600 kg (1,300 lb) | 401 |
| DG 1000 | DG | (Germany) | | 2000 | Dual | 2 | 20 m (66 ft) | 22.8 | 46.5:1 | | 0.5 m/s (1.0 kn) | 270 km/h (170 mph; 150 kn) | 415 kg (915 lb) | 750 kg (1,650 lb) | |
| Discus | Schempp-Hirth | (Germany) | | 1983 | Standard | 1 | 15 m (49 ft) | 21.8 | 42:1 | | 0.59 m/s (1.1 kn) | 250 km/h (160 mph; 130 kn) | 233 kg (514 lb) | 525 kg (1,157 lb) | 850+ |
| Discus 2 | Schempp-Hirth | (Germany) | | 1998 | Standard | 1 | 15 m (49 ft) | 22.2 | 45:1 | | 0.59 m/s (1.1 kn) | 250 km/h (160 mph; 130 kn) | 242 kg (534 lb) | 525 kg (1,157 lb) | |
| Doppelraab | Raab | (Germany) | | 1951 | Trainer | 2 | 12.7 m (42 ft) | 9.05 | 20:1 | 55 km/h (34 mph; 30 kn) | 0.85 m/s (1.65 kn) | 190 km/h (120 mph; 100 kn) | 185 kg (408 lb) | 380 kg (840 lb) | 360 |
| Duo Discus | Schempp-Hirth | (Germany) | | 1993 | Dual | 2 | 20 m (66 ft) | 24.4 | 46:1 | | 0.58 m/s (1.13 kn) | 263 km/h (163 mph; 142 kn) | 410 kg (900 lb) | 700 kg (1,500 lb) | 500+ |
| Eagle | Slingsby | (United Kingdom) | | 1954 | Dual | 2 | 17.8 m (58 ft) | 14.8 | 31.5:1 | 83 km/h (52 mph; 45 kn) | | 237 km/h (147 mph; 128 kn) | 372 kg (820 lb) | 562 kg (1,239 lb) | 17 |
| Edelweiss | Siren | (France) | | 1962 | Standard | 1 | 15 m (49 ft) | 18 | 36:1 | 95 km/h (59 mph; 51 kn) | 0.65 m/s (1.3 kn) | 225 km/h (140 mph; 121 kn) | 238 kg (525 lb) | 380 kg (840 lb) | 52 |
| FK 3 | VFW-Fokker GmbH | (Germany) | | 1968 | Open | 1 | 17.4 m (57 ft) | 21.9 | 42:1 | 88 km/h (55 mph; 48 kn) | 0.53 m/s (1.0 kn) | 270 km/h (170 mph; 150 kn) | 240 kg (530 lb) | 400 kg (880 lb) | 13 |
| Gö 1 Wolf | Schempp-Hirth | (Germany) | | 1935 | | 1 | 14 m (46 ft) | 13 | 17:1 | 72 km/h (45 mph; 39 kn) | 0.96 m/s (1.9 kn) | | 145 kg (320 lb) | 220 kg (490 lb) | 6+ |
| Gö 3 | Schempp-Hirth | (Germany) | | 1935 | | 1 | 17 m (56 ft) | 16.1 | 28:1 | | 0.61 m/s (1.2 kn) | 219 km/h (136 mph; 118 kn) | 245 kg (540 lb) | 350 kg (770 lb) | 110 |
| Gö 4 Gövier | Schempp-Hirth | (Germany) | | 1937 | Trainer | 2 | 14.7 m (48 ft) | 11.5 | 20:1 | | 0.9 m/s (1.7 kn) | 200 km/h (120 mph; 110 kn) | 242 kg (534 lb) | 410 kg (900 lb) | 125 |
| Grunau Baby | Schneider | (Germany) | | 1931 | | 1 | 13.6 m (45 ft) | 13 | 17:1 | 61 km/h (38 mph; 33 kn) | 0.79 m/s (1.5 kn) | 150 km/h (93 mph; 81 kn) | 159 kg (351 lb) | 250 kg (550 lb) | 6000+ |
| Hornet | Glasflügel | (Germany) | | 1974 | Standard | 1 | 15 m (49 ft) | 23 | 38:1 | | 0.6 m/s (1.2 kn) | 250 km/h (160 mph; 130 kn) | 227 kg (500 lb) | 420 kg (930 lb) | 102 |
| HP-11 | Richard Schreder | (United States) | | 1962 | | 1 | 15.85 m (52.0 ft) | 26 | 37:1 | 89 km/h (55 mph; 48 kn) | 0.55 m/s (1.1 kn) | | 181 kg (399 lb) | 295 kg (650 lb) | 42 |
| HP-16 | Richard Schreder | (United States) | | 1971 | Standard Homebuilt | 1 | 15 m (49 ft) | 21.5 | 36:1 | 89 km/h (55 mph; 48 kn) | 0.66 m/s (1.3 kn) | | 227 kg (500 lb) | 419 kg (924 lb) | 20 approx. |
| HP-18 | Richard Schreder | (United States) | | 1970 | Homebuilt | 1 | 15 m (49 ft) | 21.4 | 38:1 | | 0.6 m/s (1.2 kn) | 240 km/h (150 mph; 130 kn) | 213 kg (470 lb) | 446 kg (983 lb) | 180kits |
| Hü 17 | Schempp-Hirth | (Germany) | | 1938 | Trainer | 1 | 9.9 m (32 ft) | 10.5 | 17:1 | 64 km/h (40 mph; 35 kn) | 0.98 m/s (1.9 kn) | 160 km/h (99 mph; 86 kn) | 110 kg (240 lb) | 210 kg (460 lb) | 100+ |
| Janus | Schempp-Hirth | (Germany) | | 1974 | Two Seater | 2 | 20 m (66 ft) | 23 | 43.5:1 | 110 km/h (68 mph; 59 kn) | 0.6 m/s (1.2 kn) | 250 km/h (160 mph; 130 kn) | 355 kg (783 lb) | 700 kg (1,500 lb) | 300 |
| JS-1 Revelation | Jonker Sailplanes | (South Africa) | | 2006 | Various | 1 | 18 or 21 m (59 or 69 ft) | 28.8 | 52:1 | | 0.5 m/s (1.0 kn) | 290 km/h (180 mph; 160 kn) | 280 kg (620 lb) | 600 kg (1,300 lb) | 100+ |
| JS-3 Rapture | Jonker Sailpanes | (South Africa) | | 2017 | 15 meter | 1 | 15 or 18 m (49 or 59 ft) | 32.8 | 55 | | 0.54 m/s (1.0 kn) | | 250 kg (550 lb) | 525 kg (1,157 lb) | 10+ |
| Ka 3 | Kaiser | (Germany) | | 1954 | | 1 | 10 m (33 ft) | 10.1 | 17.5:1 | 75 km/h (47 mph; 40 kn) | 0.95 m/s (1.8 kn) | 160 km/h (99 mph; 86 kn) | 100 kg (220 lb) | 195 kg (430 lb) | 15 |
| Ka-4 | Schleicher | (Germany) | | 1955 | Trainer | 2 | 13 m (43 ft) | 10.3 | 19:1 | 79 km/h (49 mph; 43 kn) | 1.1 m/s (2.1 kn) | 170 km/h (110 mph; 92 kn) | 104 kg (229 lb) | 400 kg (880 lb) | 350+ |
| Ka 6 | Schleicher | (Germany) | | 1956 | Club | 1 | 15 m (49 ft) | 18.1 | 32:1 | 80 km/h (50 mph; 43 kn) | 0.65 m/s (1.3 kn) | 200 km/h (120 mph; 110 kn) | 190 kg (420 lb) | 300 kg (660 lb) | 1000+ |
| Kestrel | Glasflügel | (Germany) | | 1968 | Open class | 1 | 17 m (56 ft) | 25 | 43:1 | 97 km/h (60 mph; 52 kn) | 0.55 m/s (1.1 kn) | 250 km/h (160 mph; 130 kn) | 260 kg (570 lb) | 400 kg (880 lb) | 129 |
| Kirby Gull | Slingsby | (United Kingdom) | | 1938 | | 1 | 15.3 m (50 ft) | 15.8 | 24:1 | 67 km/h (42 mph; 36 kn) | 0.72 m/s (1.4 kn) | 129 km/h (80 mph; 70 kn) | 172 kg (379 lb) | 283 kg (624 lb) | 11 |
| Kookaburra | Schneider | (Australia) | | 1954 | Trainer | 2 | 11.7 m (38 ft) | 9.1 | 20:1 | 81 km/h (50 mph; 44 kn) | 1.05 m/s (2.0 kn) | 220 km/h (140 mph; 120 kn) | 220 kg (490 lb) | 393 kg (866 lb) | 44 |
| Antares | Lange Aviation GmbH | (Germany) | | 2003 | 18 meter/ Open | 1 | 18 or 20m | 31.7 | 56:1 | | 0.49 m/s (1.0 kn) | 280 km/h (170 mph; 150 kn) | 460 kg (1,010 lb) | 660 kg (1,460 lb) | 50+ |
| Standard Libelle | Glasflügel | (Germany) | | 1964 | Club | 1 | 15 m (49 ft) | 23.6 | 39:1 | 95 km/h (51 kn; 59 mph) | 0.6 m/s (1.2 kn) | 250 km/h (130 kn; 160 mph) | 190 kg (420 lb) | 300 kg (660 lb) | 601 |
| Lo-100 | Vogt | (Germany) | | 1952 | Aerobatic | 1 | 10 m (33 ft) | 9.2 | 25:1 | 85 km/h (46 kn; 53 mph) | 0.8 m/s (1.6 kn) | 290 km/h (160 kn; 180 mph) | 150 kg (330 lb) | 265 kg (584 lb) | 45 aprrox. |
| LP-15 Nugget | Laister | (United States) | | 1971 | Standard | 1 | 15 m (49 ft) | 22.1 | 36.5:1 | 93 km/h (58 mph; 50 kn) | 0.66 m/s (1.3 kn) | | 193 kg (425 lb) | 408 kg (899 lb) | 15 |
| LS1 | Rolladen-Schneider | (Germany) | | 1968 | Standard | 1 | 15 m (49 ft) | 23.1 | 38.5:1 | | 0.6 m/s (1.2 kn) | 250 km/h (160 mph; 130 kn) | 230 kg (510 lb) | 390 kg (860 lb) | 464 |
| LS3 | Rolladen-Schneider | (Germany) | | 1976 | 15 meter | 1 | 15 m (49 ft) | 21.4 | 40.7:1 | | 0.62 m/s (1.2 kn) | 270 km/h (170 mph; 150 kn) | 243 kg (536 lb) | 472 kg (1,041 lb) | 429 |
| LS4 | Rolladen-Schneider | (Germany) | | 1980 | Standard | 1 | 15 m (49 ft) | | 40.5:1 | | 0.61 m/s (1.2 kn) | 270 km/h (170 mph; 150 kn) | 238 kg (525 lb) | 472 kg (1,041 lb) | 1,048 |
| LS6 | Rolladen-Schneider | (Germany) | | 1983 | 15m Class | 1 | 15 m (49 ft) | | 44:1 | | 0.58 m/s (1.1 kn) | 270 km/h (170 mph; 150 kn) | 250 kg (550 lb) | 525 kg (1,157 lb) | 375 |
| LS7 | Rolladen-Schneider | (Germany) | | 1987 | Standard | 1 | 15 m (49 ft) | | 43:1 | | | 270 km/h (170 mph; 150 kn) | 234 kg (516 lb) | | 164 |
| LS8 | Rolladen-Schneider | (Germany) | | 1987 | Standard 18 meter | 1 | 15 or 18 m (49 or 59 ft) | | 43:1 | | 0.59 m/s (1.1 kn) | 280 km/h (170 mph; 150 kn) | 250 kg (550 lb) | 525 kg (1,157 lb) | 491 |
| LS10 | Rolladen-Schneider | (Germany) | | 2003 | 18 meter | 1 | 18 m (59 ft) | | 50:1 | | 0.5 m/s (1.0 kn) | 280 km/h (170 mph; 150 kn) | 305 kg (672 lb) | 600 kg (1,300 lb) | 19 |
| Mistral-C | ISF | (Germany) | | 1976 | Club | 1 | 15 m (49 ft) | | 37.5:1 | | 0.66 m/s (1.3 kn) | 250 km/h (160 mph; 130 kn) | 225 kg (496 lb) | 350 kg (770 lb) | 75+ |
| Monerai | Monnett | (United States) | | 1978 | Homebuilt | 1 | 10.9 m (36 ft) | | 28:1 | | 0.85 m/s (1.7 kn) | 193 km/h (120 mph; 104 kn) | 100 kg (220 lb) | 204 kg (450 lb) | 100 |
| Mosquito | Glasflügel | (Germany) | | 1980 | 15 meter | 1 | 15 m (49 ft) | | 39:1 | | 0.5 m/s (1.0 kn) | 250 km/h (160 mph; 130 kn) | 242 kg (534 lb) | 450 kg (990 lb) | 202 |
| Nimbus Mini | Schempp-Hirth | (Germany) | | 1976 | 15 meter | 1 | 15 m (49 ft) | 23 | 42:1 | | 0.57 m/s (1.1 kn) | 250 km/h (160 mph; 130 kn) | 235 kg (518 lb) | 500 kg (1,100 lb) | 159 |
| Nimbus 2 | Schempp-Hirth | (Germany) | | 1971 | Open | 1 | 20.3 m (67 ft) | 28.6 | 49:1 | 90 km/h (56 mph; 49 kn) | 0.49 m/s (1.0 kn) | 270 km/h (170 mph; 150 kn) | 276 kg (608 lb) | 400 kg (880 lb) | 183 |
| Nimbus 3 | Schempp-Hirth | (Germany) | | 1980 | Open | 1 | 22.9 m (75 ft) | 32.2 | 55:1 | 95 km/h (59 mph; 51 kn) | 0.44 m/s (0.9 kn) | 270 km/h (170 mph; 150 kn) | 392 kg (864 lb) | 750 kg (1,650 lb) | |
| Nimbus 4 | Schempp-Hirth | (Germany) | | 1990 | Open | 1 | 26.5 m (87 ft) | 38.8 | 60:1 | | 0.38 m/s (0.7 kn) | 285 km/h (177 mph; 154 kn) | 595 kg (1,312 lb) | 820 kg (1,810 lb) | 144+ |
| Pegase | Centrair | (France) | | 1981 | Standard | 1 | 15 m (49 ft) | 21.4 | 42.5:1 | 105 km/h (65 mph; 57 kn) | 0.62 m/s (1.2 kn) | 250 km/h (160 mph; 130 kn) | 252 kg (556 lb) | 505 kg (1,113 lb) | |
| Phoebus | Bölkow | (Germany) | | 1964 | Standard | 1 | 15 m (49 ft) | 17.1 | 37:1 | 90 km/h (56 mph) | 0.65 m/s (128 ft/min) | 200 km/h (120 mph; 110 kn) | 220 kg (490 lb) | 350 kg (770 lb) | 250 |
| PIK-16 Vasama | PIK | (Finland) | | 1961 | Standard | 1 | 15 m (49 ft) | 19.2 | 34.5:1 | 86 km/h (53 mph; 46 kn) | 0.59 m/s (1.1 kn) | 250 km/h (160 mph; 130 kn) | 166 kg (366 lb) | 281 kg (619 lb) | 56 |
| PIK20 | Eiri-Avion | (Finland) | | 1973 | 15 meter | 1 | 15 m (49 ft) | 22.5 | 42:1 | 110 km/h (68 mph; 59 kn) | 0.66 m/s (1.3 kn) | 262 km/h (163 mph; 141 kn) | 235 kg (518 lb) | 450 kg (990 lb) | 425+ |
| Professor | Lippisch | (Germany) | | 1928 | Standard | 1 | 16.1 m (53 ft) | | 14:1 | | | | 166 kg (366 lb) | 246 kg (542 lb) | |
| PS-2 | Franklin | (United States) | | 1930 | | 1 | 10.9 m (36 ft) | 7.2 | 15:1 | | 0.76 m/s (1.5 kn) | | 100 kg (220 lb) | 181 kg (399 lb) | 54 |
| PW-5 Smyk | Politechnika Warszawska | (Poland) | | 1993 | World | 1 | 13.4 m (44 ft) | 17.7 | 32:1 | | 0.65 m/s (1.3 kn) | 280 km/h (170 mph; 150 kn) | 190 kg (420 lb) | 300 kg (660 lb) | 200+ |
| Quintus | Schempp-Hirth | (Germany) | | 2011 | Open | 1 | 23m | 36 | | | | 270 km/h (170 mph; 150 kn) | 500 kg (1,100 lb) | 850 kg (1,870 lb) | |
| Rhönbussard | Schleicher | (Germany) | | 1933 | | 1 | 14.3 m (47 ft) | 14.5 | 20:1 | | 0.75 m/s (1.5 kn) | 130 km/h (81 mph; 70 kn) | 150 kg (330 lb) | 245 kg (540 lb) | 200+ |
| Salto | Start + Flug | (Germany) | | 1970 | Aerobatic | 1 | 13.3 m (44 ft) | 20.6 | 34.5:1 | | 0.6 m/s (1.2 kn) | 280 km/h (150 kn; 170 mph) | 182 kg (401 lb) | 280 kg (620 lb) | 72 |
| SF-27 Zugvogel V | Scheibe | (Germany) | | 1964 | Standard | 1 | 15 m (49 ft) | 18.7 | 34:1 | | 0.64 m/s (1.2 kn) | 200 km/h (110 kn; 120 mph) | 210 kg (460 lb) | 320 kg (710 lb) | 120 |
| SGS 1-26 | Schweizer | (United States) | | 1954 | Club | 1 | 12.2 m (40 ft) | 10 | 23:1 | 85 km/h (46 kn; 53 mph) | 0.88 m/s (1.7 kn) | 182 km/h (98 kn; 113 mph) | 202 kg (445 lb) | 318 kg (701 lb) | 700 |
| SGU 2-22 | Schweizer | (United States) | | 1946 | Trainer | 2 | 13.1 m (43 ft) | 8.8 | 17:1 | 75 km/h (40 kn; 47 mph) | 1.07 m/s (2.1 kn) | | 213 kg (470 lb) | 408 kg (899 lb) | 258 |
| SHK | Schempp-Hirth | (Germany) | | 1965 | Open | 1 | 17 m (56 ft) | 20.2 | 38:1 | 87 km/h (47 kn; 54 mph) | 0.61 m/s (1.2 kn) | 200 km/h (110 kn; 120 mph) | 260 kg (570 lb) | 370 kg (820 lb) | 59 |
| Spatz A | Scheibe | (Germany) | | 1952 | Club | 1 | 15 m (49 ft) | 19 | 29:1 | 72 km/h (39 kn; 45 mph) | 0.65 m/s (1.3 kn) | 180 km/h (97 kn; 110 mph) | 153 kg (337 lb) | 265 kg (584 lb) | 170 |
| Skylark 2 | Slingsby | (United Kingdom) | | 1953 | | 1 | 14.6 m (48 ft) | 16 | 30:1 | 78 km/h (42 kn; 48 mph) | | 215 km/h (116 kn; 134 mph) | 191 kg (421 lb) | 308 kg (679 lb) | 63 |
| Skylark 3 | Slingsby | (United Kingdom) | | 1957 | | 1 | 18.1 m (59 ft) | 20.5 | 32:1 | 74 km/h (40 kn; 46 mph) | 0.56 m/s (1.1 kn) | 216 km/h (117 kn; 134 mph) | 253 kg (558 lb) | 358 kg (789 lb) | 70 |
| Skylark 4 | Slingsby | (United Kingdom) | | 1961 | | 1 | 18.2 m (60 ft) | 20.5 | 36:1 | 76 km/h (41 kn; 47 mph) | 0.53 m/s (1.0 kn) | 228 km/h (123 kn; 142 mph) | 258 kg (569 lb) | 376 kg (829 lb) | 65 |
| Standard Austria | Schempp-Hirth | (Germany) | | 1959 | Aerobatic | 1 | 15 m (49 ft) | 16.7 | 34:1 | 105 km/h (57 kn; 65 mph) | 0.7 m/s (1.4 kn) | 250 km/h (130 kn; 160 mph) | 205 kg (452 lb) | 323 kg (712 lb) | 81 |
| SZD-10 Czapla | SZD | (Poland) | | 1955 | Trainer | 2 | 16 m (52 ft) | 10.67 | 17:1 | 64 km/h64 km/h (35 kn; 40 mph) | 0.96 m/s (1.9 kn) | 160 km/h (86 kn; 99 mph) | 280 kg (620 lb) | 435 kg (959 lb) | 157 |
| SZD-19 Zefir | SZD | (Poland) | | 1958 | | 1 | 17 m (56 ft) | 20.6 | 35:1 | 95 km/h (51 kn; 59 mph) | 0.72 m/s (1.4 kn) | 220 km/h (120 kn; 140 mph) | 295 kg (650 lb) | 405 kg (893 lb) | 22 |
| SZD-22 Mucha Standard | SZD | (Poland) | | 1958 | Standard | 1 | 14.9 m (49 ft) | 17.7 | 27.8:1 | 75 km/h75 km/h (40 kn; 47 mph) | 0.73 m/s (1.4 kn) | 250 km/h (130 kn; 160 mph) | 219 kg (483 lb) | 350 kg (770 lb) | 288 |
| SZD-24 Foka | SZD | (Poland) | | 1960 | Standard | 1 | 15 m (49 ft) | 18.5 | 34:1 | 87 km/h (47 kn; 54 mph) | 0.66 m/s (1.3 kn) | 260 km/h (140 kn; 160 mph) | 245 kg (540 lb) | 312 kg (688 lb) | 350 |
| SZD-30 Pirat | PZL Bielsko | (Poland) | | 1966 | Club | 1 | 15 m (49 ft) | 16.3 | 33:1 | 82 km/h (44 kn; 51 mph) | 0.7 m/s (1.4 kn) | 250 km/h (130 kn; 160 mph) | 260 kg (570 lb) | 370 kg (820 lb) | 776 |
| SZD-36 Cobra 15 | PZL Bielsko | (Poland) | | 1969 | Standard | 1 | 15 m (49 ft) | 19.4 | 38:1 | 97 km/h | 0.72 m/s (1.4 kn) | 250 km/h (130 kn; 160 mph) | 275 kg (606 lb) | 405 kg (893 lb) | 290 |
| SZD-41 Jantar std. | SZD | (Poland) | | 1973 | Standard | 1 | 15 m (49 ft) | 21.1 | 38:1 | 92 km/h (50 kn; 57 mph) | 0.69 m/s (1.3 kn) | 250 km/h (160 mph; 130 kn) | 244 kg (538 lb) | 360 kg (790 lb) | 159 |
| SZD-42 Jantar 2 | SZD | (Poland) | | 1977 | Open | 1 | 17.5 m (57 ft) | 29.5 | 50:1 | 103 km/h (56 kn; 64 mph) | 0.77 m/s (1.5 kn) | 250 km/h (160 mph; 130 kn) | 362 kg (798 lb) | 458 kg (1,010 lb) | 118 |
| SZD-48 Jantar 2/3 | PZL Bielsko | (Poland) | | 1977 | Standard | 1 | 15 m (49 ft) | 21 | 40:1 | 97 km/h | 0.77 m/s | 285 km/h (154 kn; 177 mph) | 274 kg (604 lb) | 540 kg (1,190 lb) | 677 |
| SZD-50 Puchacz | PZL Bielsko | (Poland) | | 1979 | Dual | 2 | 16.7 m (55 ft) | 15.3 | 30:1 | 85 km/h (46 kn; 53 mph) | 0.7 m/s (1.4 kn) | 215 km/h (116 kn; 134 mph) | 370 kg (820 lb) | 570 kg (1,260 lb) | 300+ |
| SZD-51 Junior | PZL Bielsko | (Poland) | | 1980 | Club | 1 | 15 m (49 ft) | 18 | 35:1 | 80 km/h (43 kn; 50 mph) | 0.59 m/s (1.1 kn) | 220 km/h (120 kn; 140 mph) | 242 kg (534 lb) | 355 kg (783 lb) | 261 |
| SZD-55 | PZL Bielsko | (Poland) | | 1988 | Standard | 1 | 15 m (49 ft) | 23.4 | 44:1 | 90 km/h (49 kn; 56 mph) | 0.48 m/s (0.9 kn) | 255 km/h (138 kn; 158 mph) | 215 kg (474 lb) | 500 kg (1,100 lb) | 110 |
| SZD-56 Diana 2 | PZL Bielsko | (Poland) | | 2005 | 15 meter | 1 | 15 m (49 ft) | 26.04 | 50:1 | | 0.45 m/s (0.9 kn) | 270 km/h (150 kn; 170 mph) | 182 kg (401 lb) | 500 kg (1,100 lb) | |
| T.21 | Slingsby | (United Kingdom) | | 1944 | Trainer | 2 | 16.5 m (54 ft) | 11.2 | 21:1 | 69 km/h (37 kn; 43 mph) | 0.89 m/s (1.7 kn) | 168 km/h (91 kn; 104 mph) | 272 kg (600 lb) | 476 kg (1,049 lb) | 226 |
| Twin Astir | Grob | (Germany) | | 1976 | Trainer | 2 | 17.5 m (57 ft) | | 38:1 | | 0.6 m/s (1.2 kn) | 250 km/h (130 kn; 160 mph) | 390 kg (860 lb) | 610 kg (1,340 lb) | 291 |
| Ventus | Schempp-Hirth | (Germany) | | 1980 | 15 meter Open | 1 | 15 m (49 ft) | | 46.5:1 | | 0.59 m/s (1.1 kn) | 270 km/h (150 kn; 170 mph) | 243 kg (536 lb) | 430 kg (950 lb) | 611 |
| Ventus 2 | Schempp-Hirth | (Germany) | | 1994 | 15/18 meter | 1 | 15 or 18 m (49 or 59 ft) | | 46:1 | | 0.51 m/s (1.0 kn) | 285 km/h (154 kn; 177 mph) | 290 kg (640 lb) | 525 kg (1,157 lb) | 627 |
| Ventus-3 | Schempp-Hirth | (Germany) | | 2016 | 15/18 meter | 1 | 15 or 18 m (49 or 59 ft) | | | | | 280 km/h (150 kn; 170 mph) | 300 kg (660 lb) | 600 kg (1,300 lb) | 4 |
| Woodstock | Jim Maupin | (United States) | | 1978 | Homebuilt | 1 | 11.9 m (39 ft) | | 24:1 | | | | 107 kg (236 lb) | 204 kg (450 lb) | 350 plans sold |
| Zuni | Applebay Sailplanes | (United States) | | 1976 | 15 meter | 1 | 15 m (49 ft) | 22 | 38:1 | 98 km/h (53 kn; 61 mph) | 0.55 m/s (1.1 kn) | 246 km/h (133 kn; 153 mph) | 243 kg (536 lb) | 544 kg (1,199 lb) | 20 |

== See also ==
- Flight
- Gliding flight
- List of gliders
- Unpowered aircraft

== Sources ==
Comprehensive Glider Database j2mcl-planeurs
Glider polar data
Sailplane Directory
