= Glasflügel H-301 =

German single-seat glider, 1964

H-301 Libelle
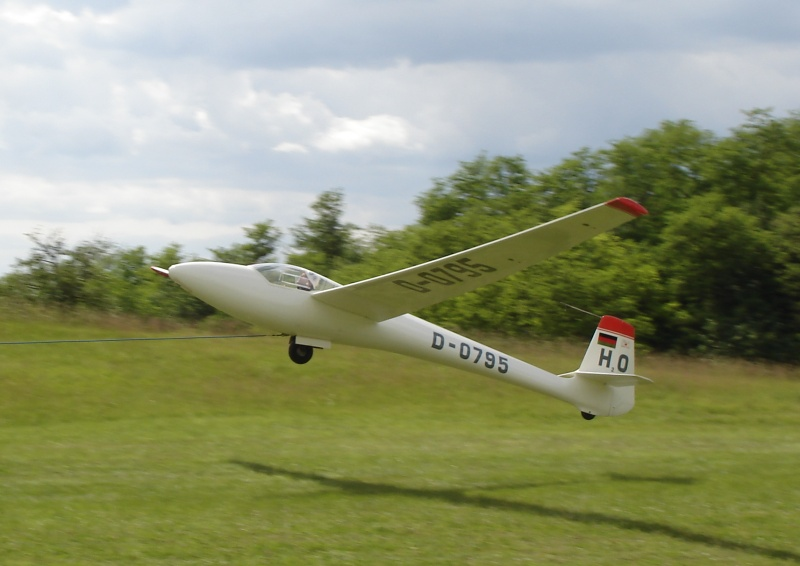
- H-301 being launched by winch

General information
- Type: 15-metre class sailplane
- National origin: Germany
- Manufacturer: Glasflügel
- Number built: 111

History
- First flight: 1964

The Glasflügel H-301 Libelle is an early composite single-seat sailplane produced by Glasflügel from 1964 to 1969. The H-301 had camber-changing wing flaps so was required to compete in the Open Class because the Standard Class excluded wing flaps. It was often known as the Open Class Libelle.

== Development ==
In 1964 the H-301 Libelle ("Dragonfly") received the first German and first U.S. Type Certificate issued to an all-fiberglass aircraft. It had flaps, water ballast and retractable landing gear.

There are two canopy variants: the normal canopy and a sleeker, lower-profiled 'racing' canopy with no side vent. The canopy is unique in that it has a catch that enables the front to be raised by 25 mm (1 in) in flight to provide a flow of ventilating air instead of the more conventional small sliding panel used for this purpose.

The American Wil Schuemann pioneered several performance-enhancing modifications to the type, including a re-profiled wing, converting the airfoil to a Wortmann section, various fairings, a new canopy and a reshaped fuselage nose. Aircraft incorporating these changes are informally known as 'Schümanised' Libelles.

== Design ==
- Wings: spar and shell of balsa or foam / reinforced plastic sandwich
- Ailerons: balsa or synthetic foam / reinforced plastic sandwich.
- Horizontal stabilizer: reinforced plastic
- Elevator: reinforced plastic
- Automatic connections for airbrakes, flaps and elevator. Ailerons are connected by a "pip" pin

The H-201 Standard Libelle was developed in 1967 as a Standard Class variant.

The Libelle was a popular and influential design. Its light wings and easy rigging set a new benchmark.

Handling is generally easy except that it is sensitive to sideslipping and has relatively ineffective airbrakes that make short landings tricky for inexperienced pilots.

The H-201 Libelle (standard class) was superseded by the Hornet.

The H-301 Libelle (open class) was superseded by the Mosquito.

== Specifications ==
General characteristics

- Crew: 1
- Capacity: 50 kg (110 lb) water ballast
- Length: 6.19 m (20 ft 4 in)
- Wingspan: 15.00 m (49 ft 3 in)
- Height: 1.25 m (4 ft 1 in)
- Wing area: 9.5 m^{2} (102 sq ft)
- Aspect ratio: 23.6
- Empty weight: 180 kg (400 lb)
- Gross weight: 300 kg (660 lb)

Performance

- Maximum speed: 200 km/h (124 mph, 108 kn)
- Maximum glide ratio: ca. 39
- Rate of sink: 0.55 m/s (108 ft/min)

== See also ==
Aircraft of comparable role, configuration, and era

- Bölkow Phoebus
- Schleicher ASW 15
- Standard Cirrus

Related lists

- List of gliders
