= Glasflügel 205 Club Libelle =

German single-seat glider, 1975

205 Club Libelle
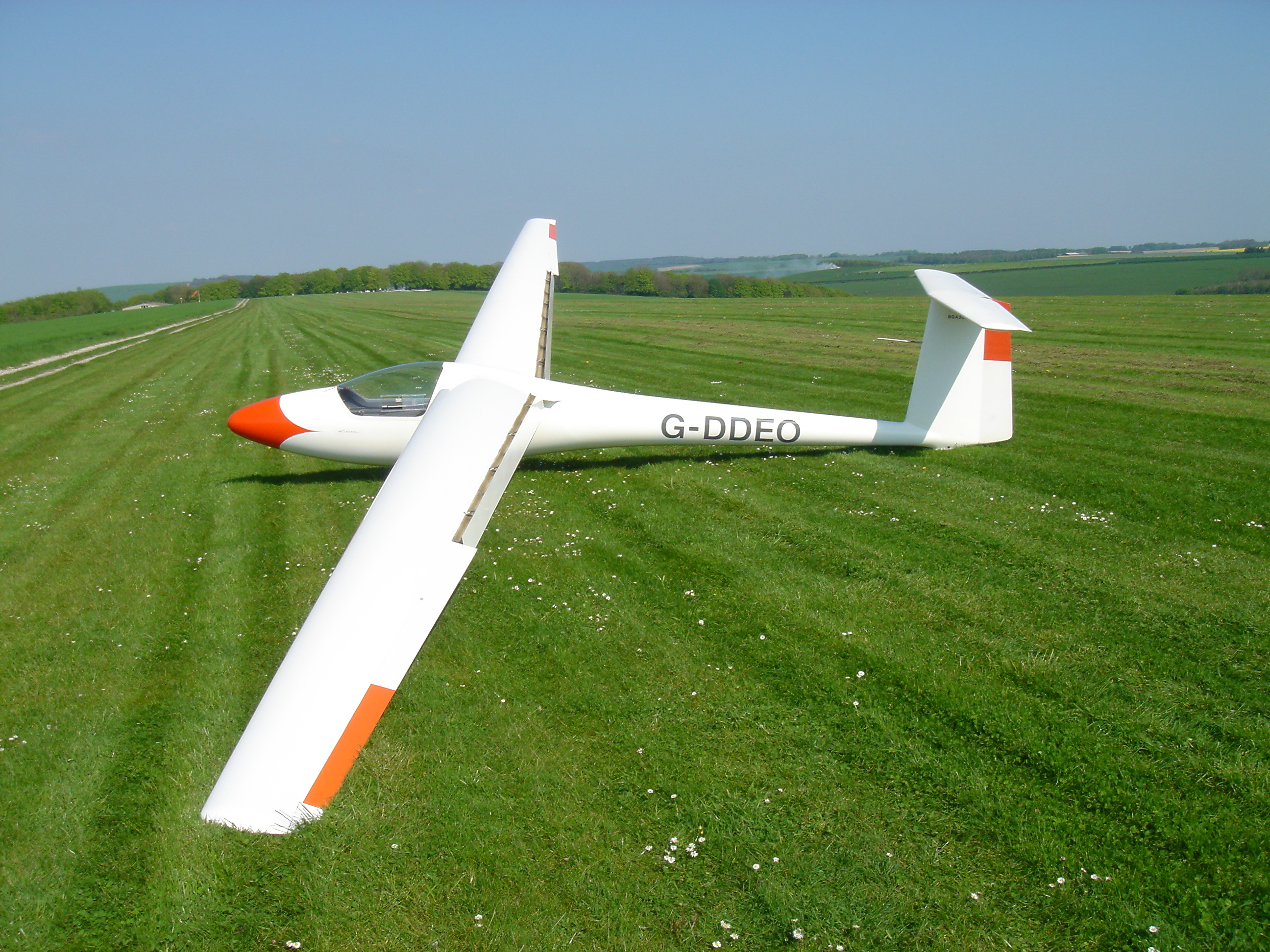

General information
- Type: Glider
- National origin: West Germany
- Status: Production completed
- Number built: 171 (as of 1983)

History
- Introduction date: 1975
- Developed from: Glasflügel H-201

The Glasflügel 205 Club Libelle is a high wing, T-tailed, single seat glider that was designed and produced in West Germany by Glasflügel for club and rental use.

== Design and development ==
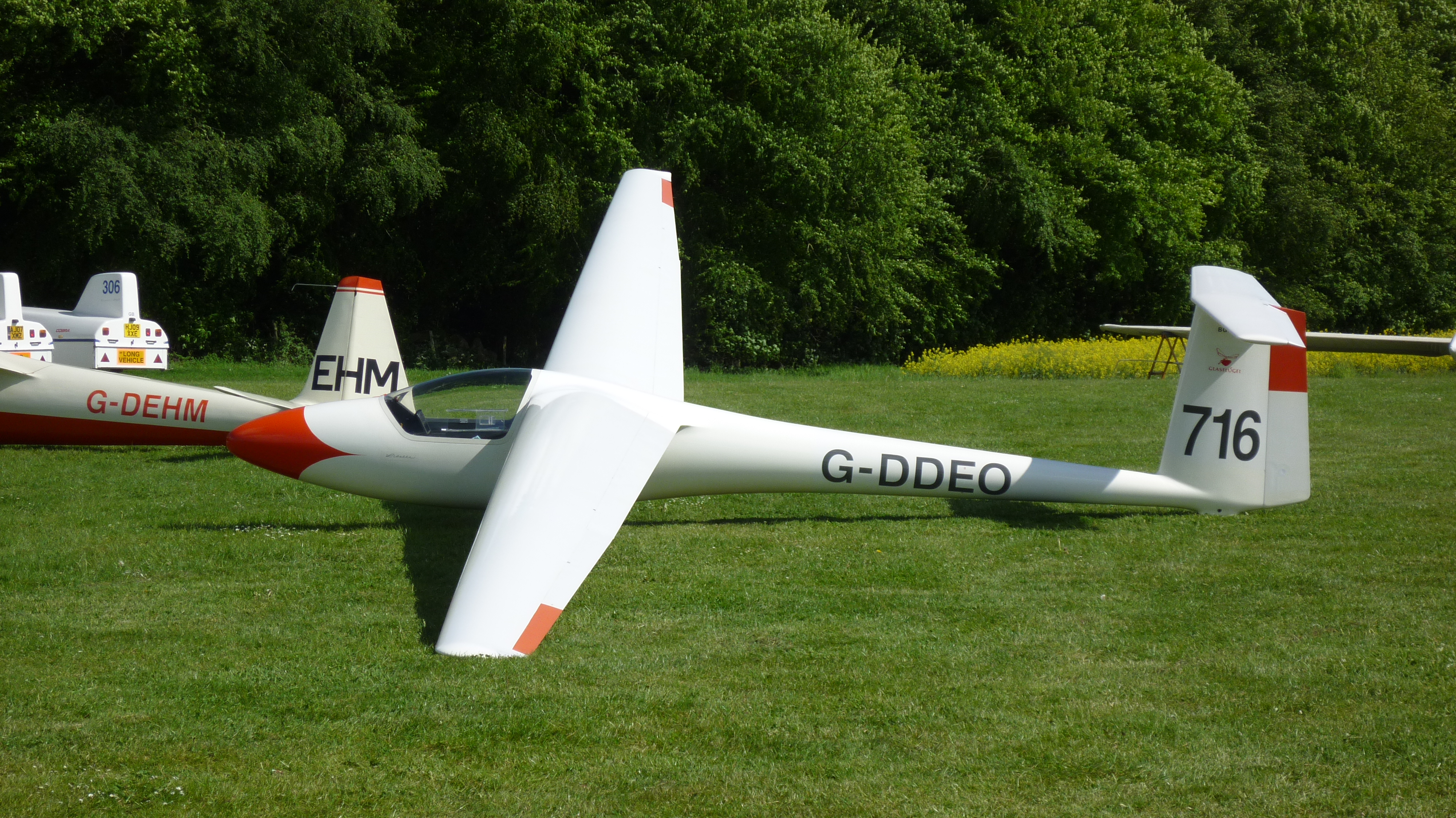
Club Libelle

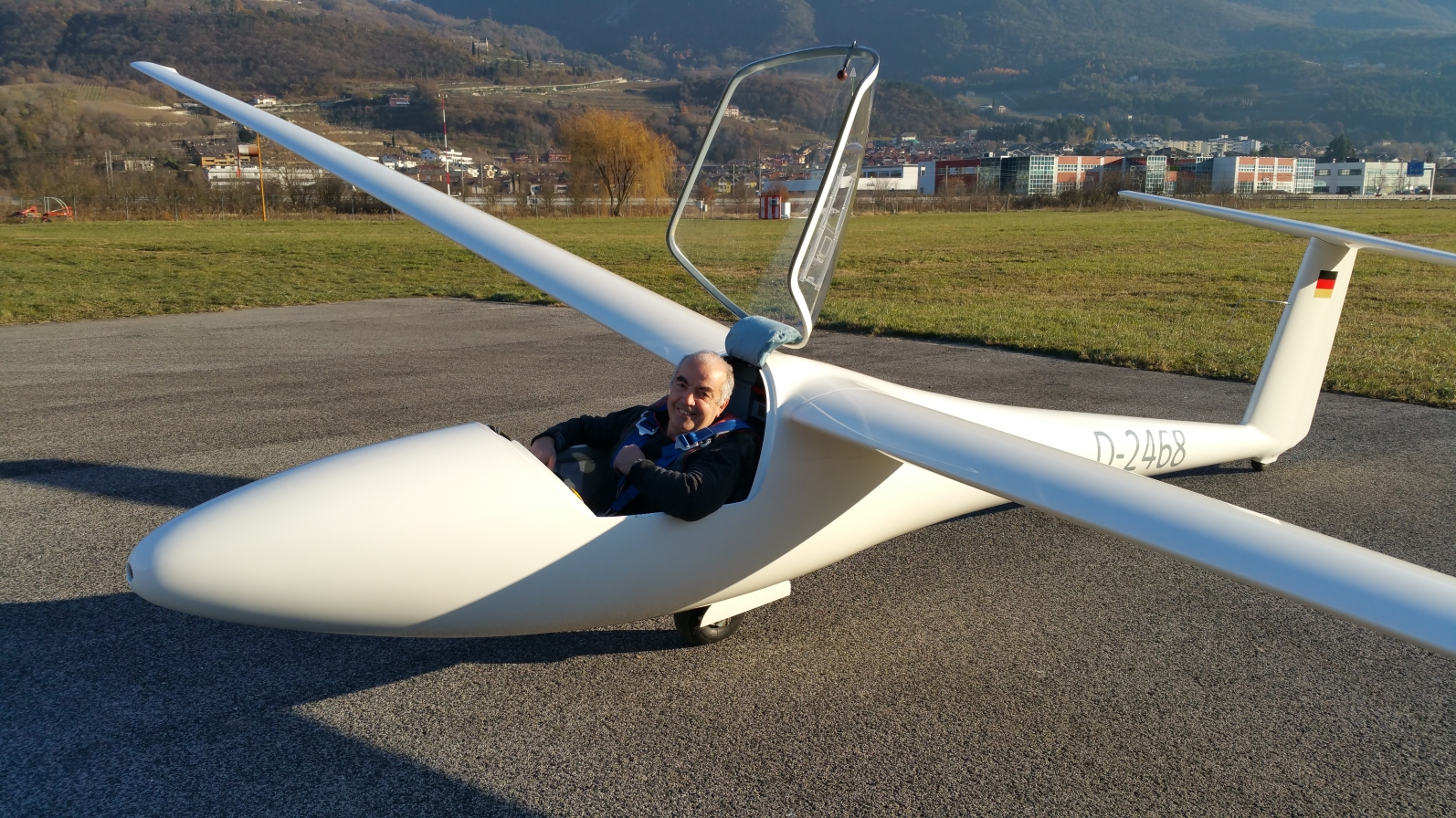
Club Libelle D-2468 with retractable undercarriage, possibly a unique modification.

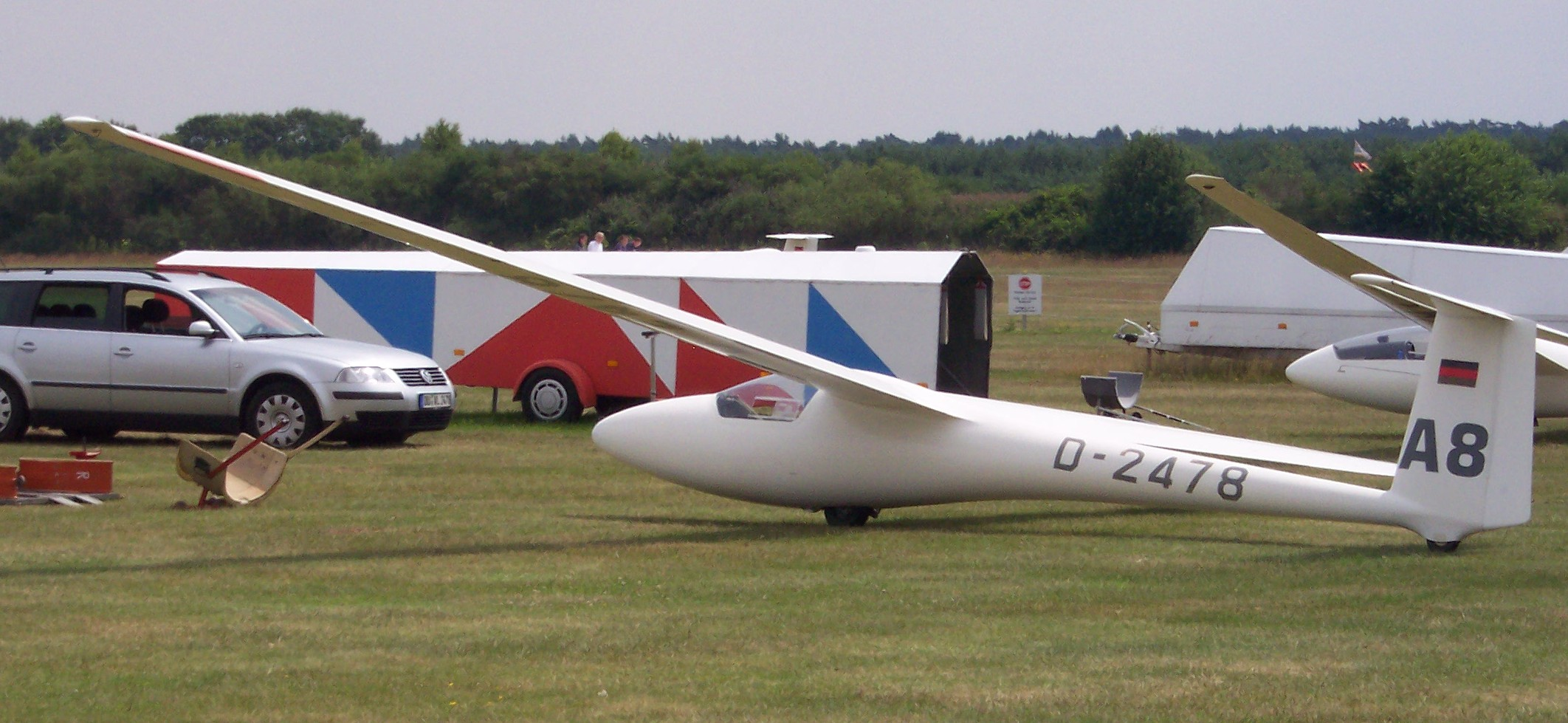
Club Libelle

The Glasflügel H-201 Standard Libelle proved immensely popular, but was not an optimal aircraft for club and rental use, due to its mid-wing and low tail which could both be damaged in off-airport landings. Also its small cockpit fits only a certain demographic percentage of soaring pilots. The company developed the 205 with the design goals of a simple, rugged aircraft that would withstand club and fixed-base operator rental use. The resulting aircraft has a high-wing and a T-tail to provide more obstacle clearance as well as a larger cockpit. To eliminate gear-up landings the monowheel landing gear is non-retractable, although at least one Club Libelle exists (D-2468 - s/n 114) which is equipped with retractable landing gear. This retrofit, fully certified, was performed by installing the landing gear of the Libelle Standard H201.

The aircraft is constructed from fibreglass. It has a new wing that uses a double-taper planform and incorporates combination spoilers and flaps that occupy two thirds of the wing's trailing edge. The 15.0 m (49.2 ft) span wing employs a Wortmann FX 66-17A II 182 airfoil, the same as is used on the Standard Libelle and the Glasflügel 206 Hornet.

The Club Libelle was type certified in Germany as well as in the United States. The US certification was granted on 8 September 1975 and includes aerobatic approval for spins, loops, hammerhead turns and lazy eights. Due to its fibreglass construction, the aircraft's certification contains the restriction: "All external portions of the glider exposed to sunlight must be painted white. Registration and competition numbers must be painted blue-gray or in any other light color."

== Operational history ==
In July 2011 there were six 205s on the United States Federal Aviation Administration registry.

== Specifications (205) ==
Data from Sailplane Directory, Soaring and US Type Certificate G12eu

General characteristics

- Crew: one
- Wingspan: 15.0 m (49 ft 3 in)
- Wing area: 9.80 m^{2} (105.5 sq ft)
- Aspect ratio: 23:1
- Airfoil: Wortmann FX 66-17A II 182
- Empty weight: 200 kg (440 lb)
- Gross weight: 350 kg (772 lb)

Performance

- Stall speed: 70 km/h (44 mph, 38 kn) with dive brakes closed
- Never exceed speed: 200 km/h (124 mph, 108 kn)
- Maximum glide ratio: 35:1 at 56 mph (90 km/h)
- Rate of sink: 0.56 m/s (110 ft/min) at 42 mph (68 km/h)
- Wing loading: 34 kg/m^{2} (6.9 lb/sq ft)

== See also ==
Aircraft of comparable role, configuration, and era

- Schleicher ASK 23
- Grob G102 Astir
- SZD-51 Junior

Related lists

- List of gliders
