= G104 =

G104 may refer to:

- China National Highway 104 or G104
- Grob G104 Speed Astir, a competition sailplane produced in Germany in the late 1970s
