= Grob G104 Speed Astir =

Competition sailplane built by Grob Aircraft, 1978

G104 Speed Astir and Speed Astir II
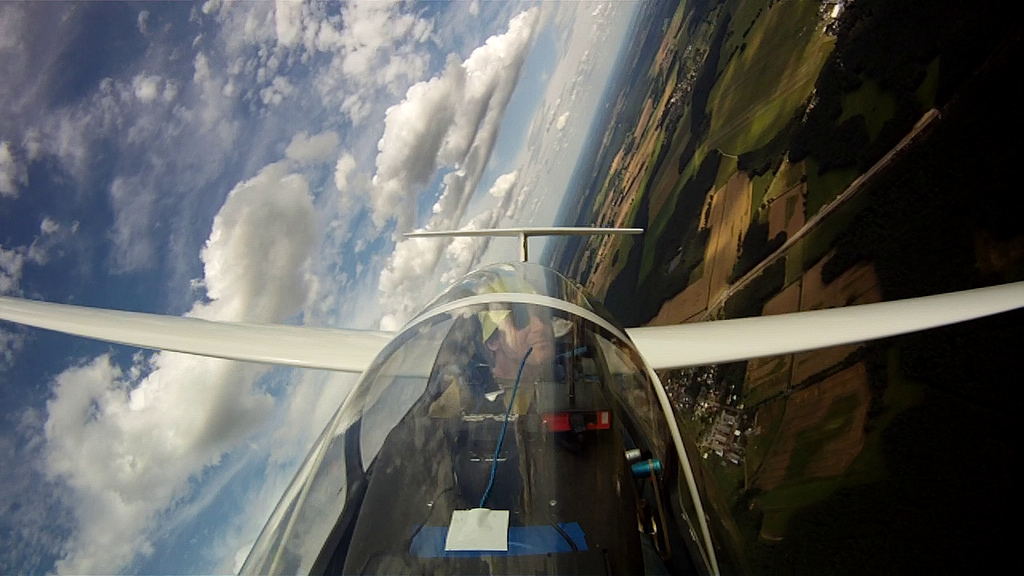
- Speed Astir IIb in flight

General information
- Type: 15 metre class sailplane
- National origin: Germany
- Manufacturer: Grob Aircraft
- Designer: Burkhart Grob
- Number built: 108

History
- First flight: April 1978

The Grob G104 Speed Astir was a competition sailplane produced in Germany in the late 1970s as Grob's first design in the 15 metre class.

== Design and development ==
Taking the G102 Astir design as a starting point, the Speed Astir featured a new wing of narrower chord and different section, a fin and rudder of reduced height, capacity for 150 kg (330 lb) of water ballast, and "elastic flaps". This latter feature eliminated the drag normally associated with the air gap between the wing and a deployed flap. It did this by extending the wing skin over the entire upper surface so the highly flexible skin served as the flap hinge and there was no air gap between the flap and the remainder of the wing.

The original Speed Astir flew in early 1978, but was replaced in production by the end of the year by a refined design named the Speed Astir II. This had a slimmer, laminar-flow fuselage and made use of carbon fibre in its construction. A version with a lengthened fuselage for taller pilots and incorporating carbon fibre wing spars was made available in 1979 as the IIB, along with an increased-span version of the IIB as the II 17.5. Production of all variants was discontinued shortly thereafter.

== Specifications (Speed Astir II) ==
General characteristics

- Crew: One pilot
- Length: 6.69 m (21 ft 11 in)
- Wingspan: 15.00 m (49 ft 3 in)
- Height: 1.27 m (4 ft 2 in)
- Wing area: 11.5 m^{2} (124 sq ft)
- Aspect ratio: 19.6
- Empty weight: 265 kg (584 lb)
- Gross weight: 515 kg (1,135 lb)

Performance

- Maximum speed: 270 km/h (168 mph, 146 kn)
- Maximum glide ratio: 41.5
- Rate of sink: 0.60 m/s (120 ft/min)

== See also ==
Aircraft of comparable role, configuration, and era

- Glaser-Dirks DG-200
- Glasflügel Mosquito
- Rolladen-Schneider LS3
- Schempp-Hirth Mini-Nimbus

Related lists

- List of gliders
