= HpH 304 =

German glider family, 1980

304
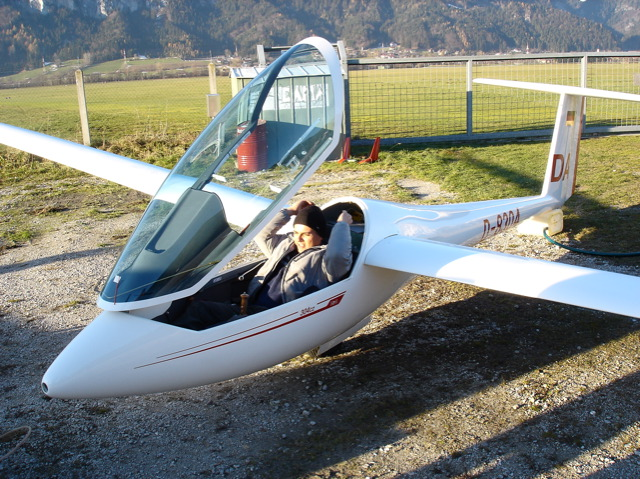
- Glasflügel 304CZ

General information
- Type: 15 metre class sailplane
- National origin: Germany
- Manufacturer: Glasflügel
- Designer: Martin Hansen
- Number built: 65

History
- First flight: May 1980

HpH 304 is a family of sailplanes ranging from a single-seat composite 15 metre Class to a two-place 20 metre Open Class manufactured by the Czech company HpH Ltd. The sailplane was derived from a glider made by Glasflügel between 1980 and 1982 that was put back in production by HpH and who have modified it substantially and developed new models since.

== Development by Glasflügel ==
The 304 was the second and last glider developed by Glasflügel in cooperation with Schempp-Hirth. It superseded the Glasflügel Mosquito.

The principal designer of the 304 was Martin Hansen, known for his role in the design of the Akaflieg Braunschweig SB-11. The glider continued the Glasflügel tradition of innovation: the parallelogram control stick, combined trailing edge flaps and airbrakes, automatic trimming, heel-operated brakes, automatic control connections, the extremely easy assembly of the wings and tailplane, the parallelogram forward-opening canopy and lifting instrument panel are Glasflügel innovations largely copied by other manufacturers.

The prototype flew for the first time in May 1980 and entered production shortly after. Glasflügel was financially struggling at that time, following the untimely death of Eugen Hänle, the founder of the company, in 1975. A partnership with Schempp-Hirth led to a surrender of technology. Lacking investment and an energetic leadership, the company folded in 1982.

A small batch was later built by the Jastreb company in Yugoslavia as the 304B.

The 304 is sometimes referred to as the H-304, which is not correct, as the H applies only to the Glasflügel sailplanes designed principally by Wolfgang Hütter.

== Development by HpH ==
The 304 was put back in production by the Czech company HpH Ltd, as the Glasflügel 304CZ. This new production run uses the original Glasflügel moulds and jigs that fortunately were not lost with the demise of the company. The 304CZ was updated with the addition of winglets and a few other changes, and has spawned several derivatives, namely a 17.43 metre span variant 304 CZ-17 and the 15 metre Standard Class 304 C Wasp.

In November 2006, HPH conducted the maiden flight of the completely new 18 metre 304 S Shark. The 304 S Shark features an all new wing design using the HpH xn2 profile with the airfoil only 13.2% of the cord thickness (16.4% at the root). The 18 metre wing yields a best glide of 51:1 and minimum sink of 0.44 m/s (0.86 kn). The new Safety Cockpit uses a Carbon/Kevlar safety shell that meets the latest EASA Safety Standards. The 304 S is larger than the 304 C and while interchangeable wing extensions are available for 15-metre or 18-metre span, the most common configuration is the 18-metre version.

The Shark is available in Self-Launch Versions (Shark MS) using the popular Solo 2625-01 powerplant, or as a sustainer using either a 400 N thrust Jet powerplant or with a Front-Electric-Sustainer (FES) solution. By early 2015 about 50 HPH Shark sailplanes had been produced with about 50% being Self-launchers, the remainder being sustainers of one type or another.

== Variants ==
304
Glasflügel produced.
304 B
Jastreb produced.
304 CZ
HpH produced variant certified in 1998 with a 15 meter span.
304 CZ-17
HpH produced variant certified in 1999 with a 15 meter span and interchangeable winglets and wing extensions to 17.43 meter span.
304 C Wasp
HpH produced variant certified in 2001 with a 15 meter span.
304 Shark
HpH produced variant first flown in 2006 and is an entirely new sailplane with interchangeable winglets for 15-meter or 18-meter span. So far only the 18m version has been produced, driven largely by customer demand. The new 18m wing offers substantially better performance than the original 304. The Shark is one of the first gliders certified to the latest version of CS22 and has a 9g cockpit utilizing Aramid fibers in the forward fuselage and carbon in the rear, except the top of the fin which is Glass so the Radio antenna can work. Virtually all Sharks have some form of motor system. See below.
304 Shark SJ
HpH produced variant with 18-meter span and optional TBS 400N jet engine for self-retrieve.
304 Shark ES
HpH produced variant with 18-meter span and optional front electric sustainer system for self-retrieve.
304 Shark MS
HpH produced variant with 18-meter span and optional Solo 2625 01 motor for self-launch.
304 TS Twin Shark
HpH produced variant with two seats and 20 meter span. The Twin-Shark first flew in July 2017 and initial flying impressions are very favorable indicating that it performs at least as well as the other two latest generation 20m flapped two seaters that are already on the market.

== Specifications (HpH 304C) ==
General characteristics

- Crew: One pilot
- Capacity: 115 kg (254 lb) water ballast
- Length: 6.45 m (21 ft 2 in)
- Wingspan: 15.00 m (49 ft 3 in)
- Height: 1.36 m (4 ft 6 in)
- Wing area: 9.9 m^{2} (106 sq ft)
- Aspect ratio: 22.8
- Empty weight: 235 kg (517 lb)
- Gross weight: 450 kg (990 lb)

Performance

- Maximum speed: 250 km/h (160 mph, 140 kn)
- Maximum glide ratio: 42.7
- Rate of sink: 0.57 m/s (112 ft/min)

== Specifications (HpH 304S - 18m) ==
General characteristics

- Crew: One pilot
- Capacity: 250 kg (550 lb) - 250 litres (66 US gal) water ballast
- Length: 6.79 m (22 ft 3 in)
- Wingspan: 18.00 m (59 ft 0 in)
- Height: 1.48 m (4 ft 10 in)
- Wing area: 11.8 m^{2} (127 sq ft)
- Aspect ratio: 27.43
- Empty weight: 280 kg (617 lb)
- Gross weight: 600 kg (1,323 lb)

Performance

- Maximum speed: 280 km/h (174 mph, 151 kn)
- Maximum glide ratio: 51.2 (Independently Measured)
- Rate of sink: 0.44 m/s (82.8 ft/min)

== See also ==
Related lists

- List of gliders
