= Grob G102 Astir =

German single-seat glider, 1974

G102 Astir
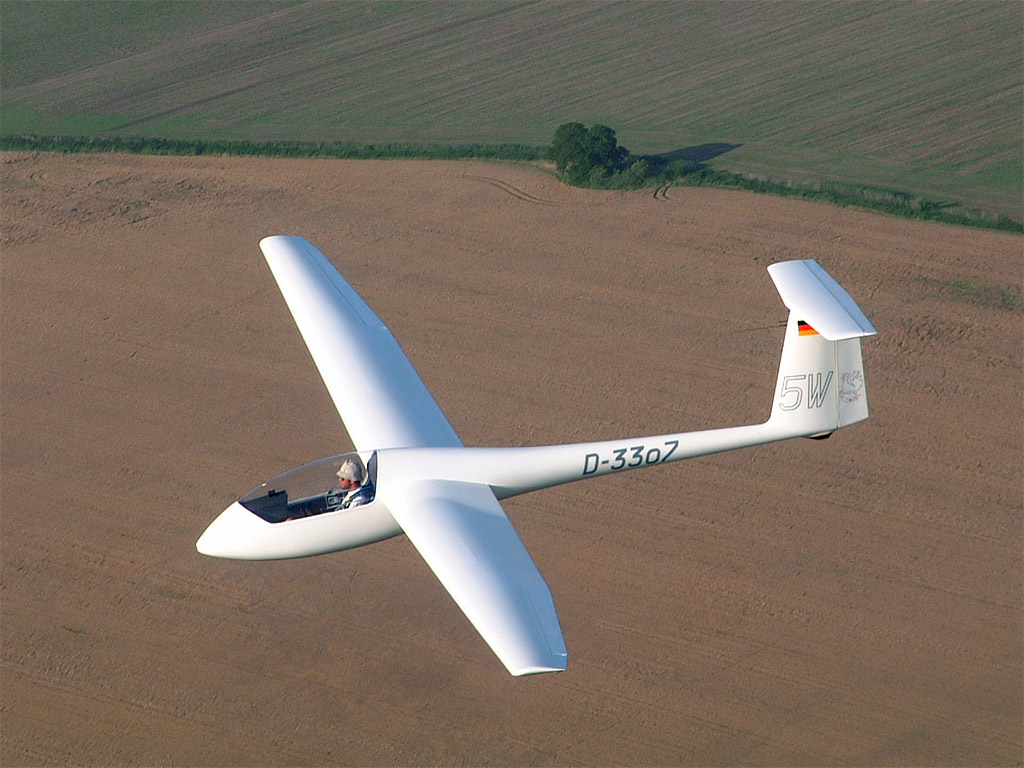
- Astir CS in flight

General information
- Type: Club Class sailplane
- National origin: Germany
- Manufacturer: Grob Aircraft
- Designer: Burkhart Grob
- Number built: 1241+

History
- Introduction date: 1975
- First flight: December 1974

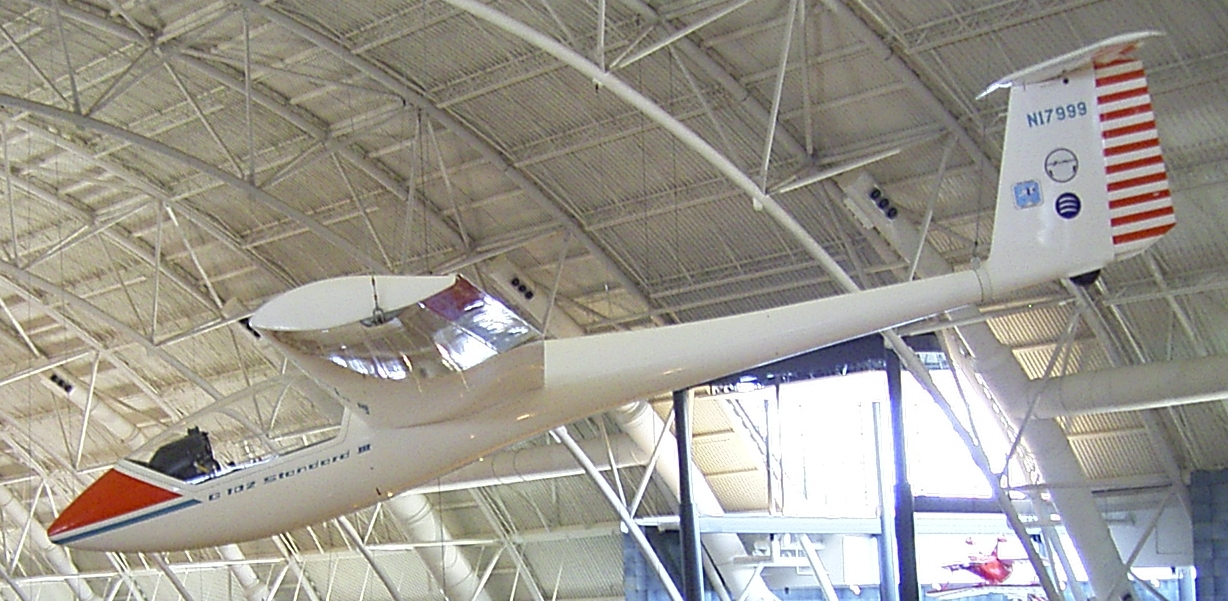
Grob G 102 Standard Astir III N17999, National Air and Space Museum

The G102 Astir is a single-seat glassfibre Club Class sailplane, designed by Burkhart Grob and built by Grob Aircraft. It was the first Grob-designed sailplane, with the first flight in December 1974. Grob had previously built the Schempp-Hirth Standard Cirrus under licence.

== Design and development ==
The Astir CS [Club Standard] is of composite (fiberglass/resin) construction, has a large wing area, a T-tail and water ballast tanks in its wings. The large wing area gives good low-speed handling characteristics but its high-speed performance is inferior to other Standard Class gliders. In early versions, some of the fuselage frame was wood but this was replaced with a light alloy casting which sometimes cracked after heavy landings. The tail dolly is unusual by being a loose fit into a vertical hole and able to fall free if take-off is attempted with the dolly in place.

A slightly improved Standard Class version, the CS 77, was introduced in 1977. It has a different rudder profile and a slimmer fuselage similar to that of the Speed Astir. The Standard II and Standard III versions followed in the early 1980s, reverting to the higher-profile fuselage and with a reduced empty weight and an increased payload.

The Astir CS Jeans was similar to the CS 77, but had a fixed mainwheel and a tailskid. Its cockpit was fitted in blue denim. Later versions were the Club II and the Club III which also had fixed gear, but the Club III had a tailwheel.

The numbers built of each type were: 536 CS, 244 CS77, 248 CS Jeans, 61 Club/Standard Astir II and 152 Club/Standard Astir III. A flapped version called the G104 Speed Astir was also produced.

The latest in the Astir line is the G102 Standard Astir III, designed by Burkhart Grob and built by Grob Aircraft as a development of the original G-102.

One Astir (now residing at the Steven F. Udvar-Hazy Center), flown by Robert Harris, broke the world absolute altitude record at 49,009 ft (14,938 m) on 17 February 1986. This record lasted until 2006.

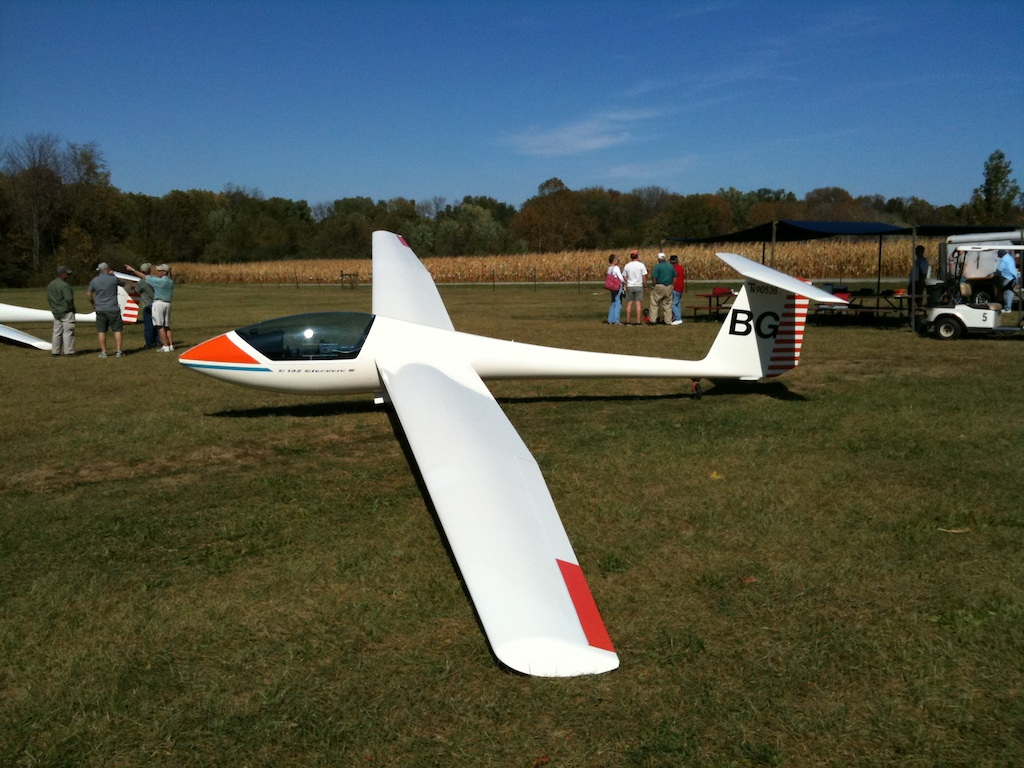
G102 Standard Astir III

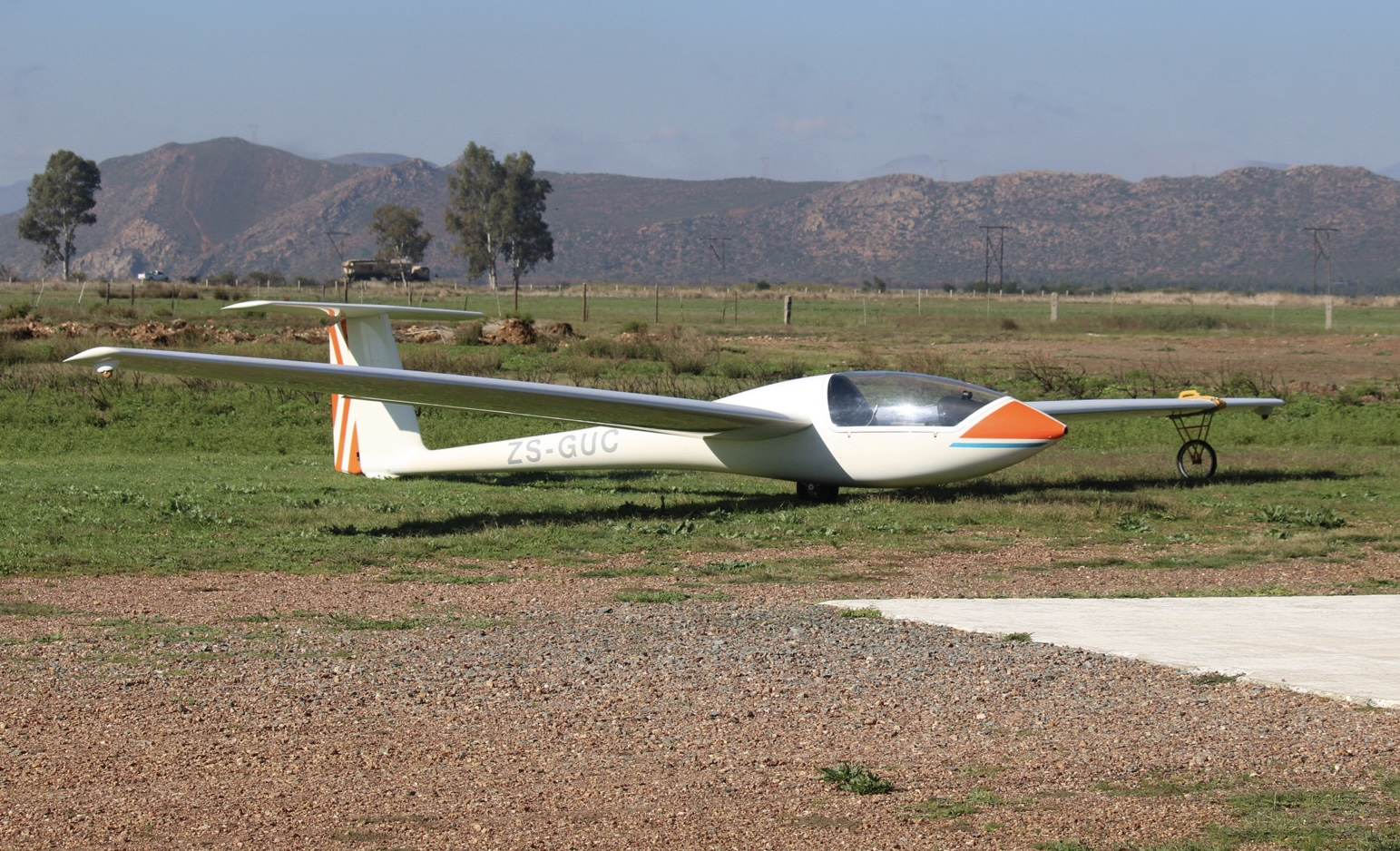
G102 Astir of the Cape Gliding Club at Worcester airfield

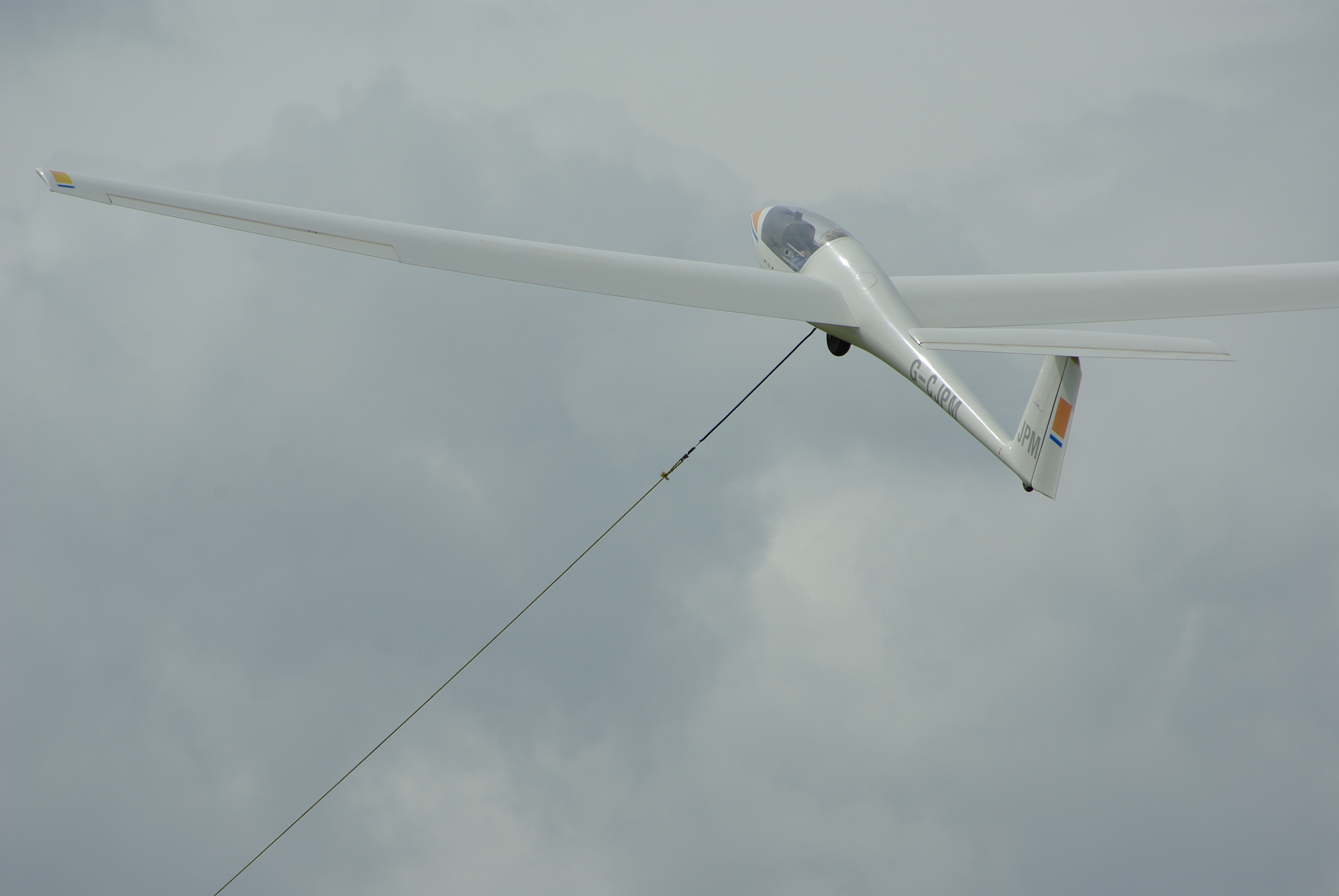
Astir CS Jeans launching

== Variants ==
Astir CS
The original production version of the Astir, produced up to 1977 (CS = Club Standard)
Astir CS77
Production aircraft from 1977, with revised fuselage profile and other modifications
Speed Astir
The Astir with a flapped wing to comply with the FAI 15m Flapped Class, for gliding competitions
Astir CS Jeans
Astir aircraft with faired fixed undercarriage, to comply with the Club Class for gliding competitions and to provide "glass-ship" experience at lower cost.
G102 Astir
Designation introduced by Grob for the Astir series in the 1980s, with each successive improvement given the suffix I, II or III etc.
G104 Speed Astir
The Speed Astir re-designated

== Specifications (Standard Astir III) ==
Data from Grob G102 manual

General characteristics

- Crew: 1
- Length: 6.75 m (22 ft 2 in)
- Wingspan: 15.0 m (49 ft 3 in)
- Height: 1.26 m (4 ft 2 in)
- Wing area: 12.4 m^{2} (133 sq ft)
- Aspect ratio: 18.2
- Empty weight: 250 kg (551 lb) approximately
- Gross weight: 450 kg (992 lb) with water ballast; without ballast 350 kg (770 lb)

Performance

- Maximum speed: 170 km/h (110 mph, 92 kn) manoeuvring and airtow
- Stall speed: 59 km/h (37 mph, 32 kn) without airbrakes
- Never exceed speed: 250 km/h (160 mph, 130 kn)
- Maximum glide ratio: Best 38, at 105 km/h (64 mph, 56 kn) and 0.77 m/s (152 ft/m)
- Rate of sink: 0.62 m/s (122 ft/min) minimum, at 76 km/h (47 mph, 42 kn) and glide ratio 34

== See also ==
Related development

- Grob G104 Speed Astir

Aircraft of comparable role, configuration, and era

- Glasflügel 205 Club Libelle
- Schleicher ASK 23
- SZD-51 Junior

Related lists

- List of gliders
