= Glasflügel 402 =

German single-seat glider, 1981

402

General information
- Type: Open class sailplane
- National origin: Germany
- Manufacturer: Glasflügel
- Designer: Martin Hansen
- Number built: 1

History
- First flight: 1981

The Glasflügel 402 is a German sailplane developed by the glider manufacturer Glasflügel.

== Specifications ==
Data from All-Aero: Glasflugel 304

General characteristics

- Crew: 1
- Length: 6.45 m (21 ft 2 in)
- Wingspan: 17 m (55 ft 9.25 in)
- Height: 1.36 m (4 ft 5.5 in)
- Wing area: 10.6 m^{2} (114 sq ft)
- Aspect ratio: 27.3 (27.43)
- Empty weight: 235 kg (518 lb)
- Max takeoff weight: 450 kg (992 lb)

Performance

- Never exceed speed: 251 km/h (156 mph, 136 kn) in smooth air
- Maximum glide ratio: 43:1 at 116 km/h (72 mph; 63 kn) (51.2 (Independently Measured))
- Rate of sink: 0.689 m/s (135.6 ft/min) at 93 km/h (58 mph; 50 kn) (0.44m/s)

== See also ==
- List of gliders
