= Hansjörg Streifeneder Falcon =

German single-seat glider, 1981

Falcon

General information
- Type: 15 metre class sailplane
- National origin: Germany
- Manufacturer: Glasflügel
- Designer: Martin Hansen
- Number built: 1

History
- First flight: 7 July 1981

The Hansjörg Streifeneder Falcon is a German sailplane developed by the glider manufacturer Glasflügel.

== Specifications ==
General characteristics

- Crew: One pilot
- Length: 6.8 m (22 ft 4 in)
- Wingspan: 15 m (49 ft 3 in)
- Wing area: 10.66 m^{2} (114.7 sq ft)
- Aspect ratio: 21.11
- Empty weight: 240 kg (529 lb)
- Gross weight: 450 kg (992 lb)

Performance

- Maximum speed: 250 km/h (156 mph, 136 kn)
- Maximum glide ratio: 41 (Independently Measured)
- Rate of sink: 0.58 m/s (82.8 ft/min)

== See also ==
- List of gliders
