= List of motor gliders =

A motor glider is an aircraft which sustains flight principally through soaring flight but also has a small engine for takeoff and emergencies. For a list of unpowered gliders see Glider types. For an exhaustive list of all Glider types see List of gliders.

This list is just a sampling, there are many many more.

Type	Country	Date	Class	Seats	Span	A/R	L/D	Climb	VMax	Empty	Maximum	Built
Lange Antares	Germany	2003	R	1	23.0 m (75.5 ft)	38.3	60:1	4 m/s (7.8 kn)	280 km/h (150 kn; 170 mph)	510 kg (1,120 lb)	850 kg (1,870 lb)	50+
Schleicher ASW 22 BE	Germany	1986	R	1	26.6 m (87.3 ft)	42.3	62:1		275 km/h (148 kn; 171 mph)	510 kg (1,120 lb)	750 kg (1,650 lb)	
Binder EB28	Germany	1986	R	2	28.0 m (91.9 ft)	46.7	65:1	2.5 m/s (4.9 kn)	275 km/h (148 kn; 171 mph)	570 kg (1,260 lb)	850 kg (1,870 lb)	
Binder EB29	Germany	2009	RE	2	29.3 m (96.1 ft)	51	68:1	2.5 m/s (4.9 kn)	280 km/h (150 kn; 170 mph)	570 kg (1,260 lb)	850 kg (1,870 lb)	
Scheibe Falke	Germany	1963	F (Rotax)	2	18.2 m (59.7 ft)	13.8	24:1	4.0 m/s (7.8 kn)	190 km/h (100 kn; 120 mph)	435 kg (959 lb)	650 kg (1,430 lb)	1200+

== See also ==
- Flight
- Gliding flight

== Sources ==
j2mcl-planeurs Comprehensive Glider Database

Glider polar data

Sailplane Directory
