= Glasflügel =

- Industry: Aerospace
- Founded: 1962
- Defunct: 1982
- Fate: Dissolved
- Headquarters: Kirchheim unter Teck, Germany
- Key people: Eugen Hänle, founder and aircraft designer
- Products: Sailplanes

The firm Glasflügel (German: glass wings) was founded by Eugen Hänle in 1962 and was located in Schlattstall, south of Kirchheim unter Teck. It was the first firm to manufacture a glass-fibre sailplane in large numbers. It was also responsible for a large number of innovations in sailplane design and technology: quick assembly systems for wings and tailplane, automatic control connections, trailing edge airbrake-flap combinations, hinged instrument panels, the parallelogram control stick and automatic trimming are some innovations introduced by Glasflügel and later adopted by other manufacturers. Some of these are standard features in nearly all gliders produced today.

Glasflügel encountered financial difficulties in the 1970s which led to a co-operation with the firm Schempp-Hirth starting from May 1975. The death of Eugen Hänle in a flight accident on September 21 of the same year further aggravated the company's position, and after further changes in ownership in 1979, it was finally dissolved in 1982.

== Products ==
The following glider types were manufactured by Glasflügel:

- Glasflügel BS-1
- Glasflügel H-30 GFK
- Glasflügel H-101 Salto
- Glasflügel H-201 Standard-Libelle
- Glasflügel H-301 Libelle
- Glasflügel 202 Standard-Libelle
- Glasflügel 203 Standard-Libelle
- Glasflügel 204 Standard-Libelle
- Glasflügel 205 Club Libelle
- Glasflügel 206 Hornet
- Glasflügel Hornet C
- Glasflügel 303 Mosquito
- Glasflügel 304
- Glasflügel 401 Kestrel
- Glasflügel 402
- Glasflügel 604
- Hansjörg Streifeneder Falcon

The projected Glasflügel 701 and 704 side-by-side two-seaters did not materialise due to the demise of the company.

== Licensed production ==
The British company Slingsby Aviation built the Kestrel under license as the Slingsby T-59. Slingsby later developed the Slingsby Vega, a family of 15-metre span gliders heavily influenced by its previous experience with Glasflügel designs.

== See also ==
Related lists

- List of gliders
