= SZD-51 Junior =

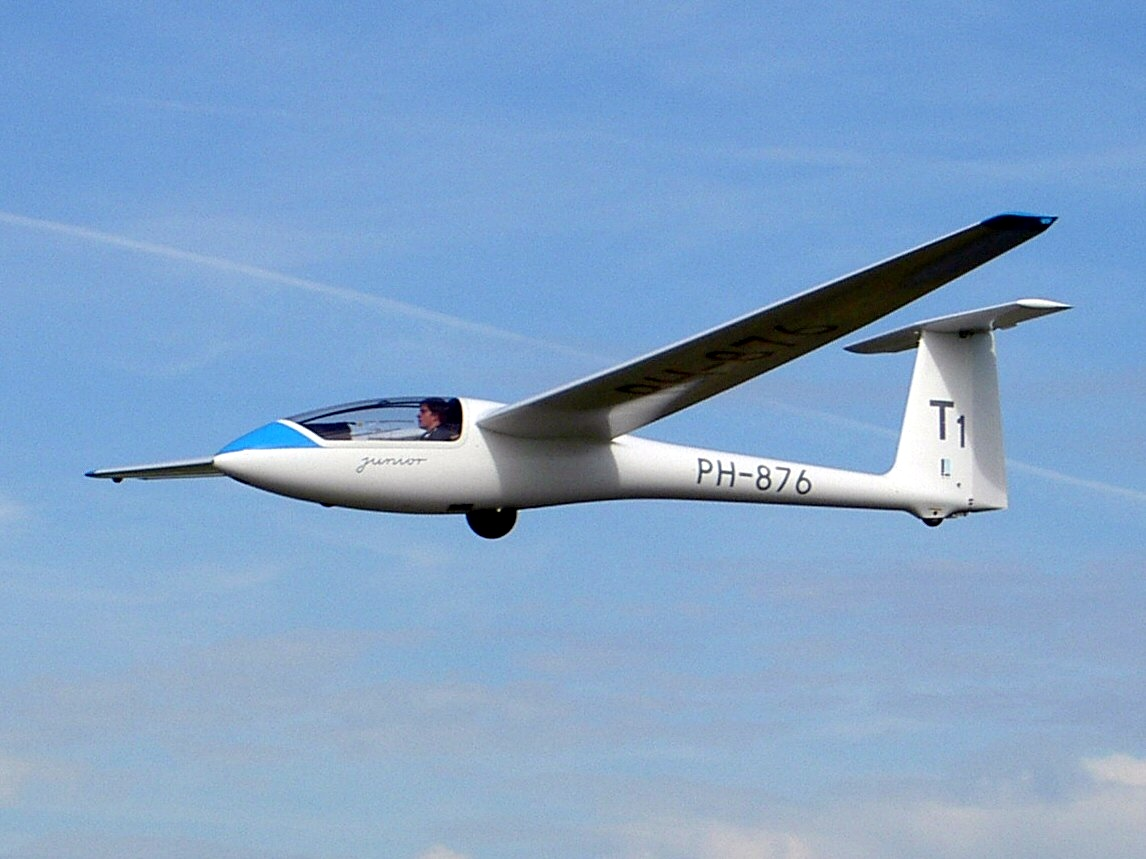

General information
- Type: Sailplane
- National origin: Poland
- Manufacturer: PZL Bielsko
- Designer: Stanislaw Zientek
- Number built: 261

History
- First flight: 31 December 1980
- Developed from: SZD-47

The PZL Bielsko SZD-51 Junior is a Polish single-seat training and club sailplane.

== Development ==
The Junior was designed by Stanislaw Zientek, based on the SZD-47 which had originally been developed in the years 1973 - 1974 at the Research and Development Center in Bielsko-Biała. The prototype SZD-51-0 was first flown on 31 December 1980, and was followed by the production version, the SZD-51-1, with a modified fuselage, A total of 261 aircraft were built. The type was proposed for licence production in Brazil, but in the event only a single SZD-51-1 was built there. The simplified SZD-51-2 was a runner up in the IGC World Class design contest.

== Description ==
The SZD-51-1 "Junior" is a single-seat glider of fiberglass construction. Only the rudder is fabric covered. The fuselage has an internal tubular steel frame, a fixed main wheel and a tail wheel. The aircraft has a two-piece wing with a spar. Schempp-Hirth type airbrakes are fitted only on the top surface of the wing. Rudder pedals are adjustable. The control for the rudder is via cables but all other control surfaces are operated by rods. The Junior is characterized by good slow-flight characteristics and is very forgiving in flight. It is designed for early solo and club flying, but is certified for aerobatics and can be equipped for high-altitude flight and cloud flying.

== Operational Service ==
As of 2014 this glider is currently in use with 3 Wing AAFC of Australian Air Force Cadets.

As of 2024, Southern Cross Gliding Club in Camden, NSW also has a Junior operating.

== Specifications (SZD-51-1) ==
Data from Jane's All the World's Aircraft 1988-89

General characteristics

- Crew: One
- Length: 6.69 m (21 ft 11 in)
- Wingspan: 15 m (49 ft 3 in)
- Height: 1.54 m (5 ft 1 in)
- Wing area: 12.51 m^{2} (134.7 sq ft)
- Aspect ratio: 18
- Airfoil: root:Wortmann FX-S-02-196; tip:FX-S-02/1-158
- Empty weight: 242 kg (534 lb)
- Max takeoff weight: 355 kg (783 lb)

Performance

- Stall speed: 60 km/h (37 mph, 32 kn)
- Never exceed speed: 220 km/h (140 mph, 120 kn) in smooth air
- Max rough air speed: 150 km/h (93 mph)
- Max aero-tow speed: 140 km/h (87 mph)
- Max winch-launch speed: 128 km/h (80 mph)
- Maximum glide ratio: 35
- Best glide speed: 80 km/h (50 mph)
- Rate of sink: 0.59 m/s (116 ft/min) at 72 km/h (45 mph)
- Wing loading: 28.4 kg/m^{2} (5.8 lb/sq ft)

== See also ==
Aircraft of comparable role, configuration, and era

- Glasflügel 205 Club Libelle
- Grob G102 Astir
- Schleicher ASK 23

Related lists List of gliders
