= Bölkow Phoebus =

German single-seat glider, 1964

Phoebus A
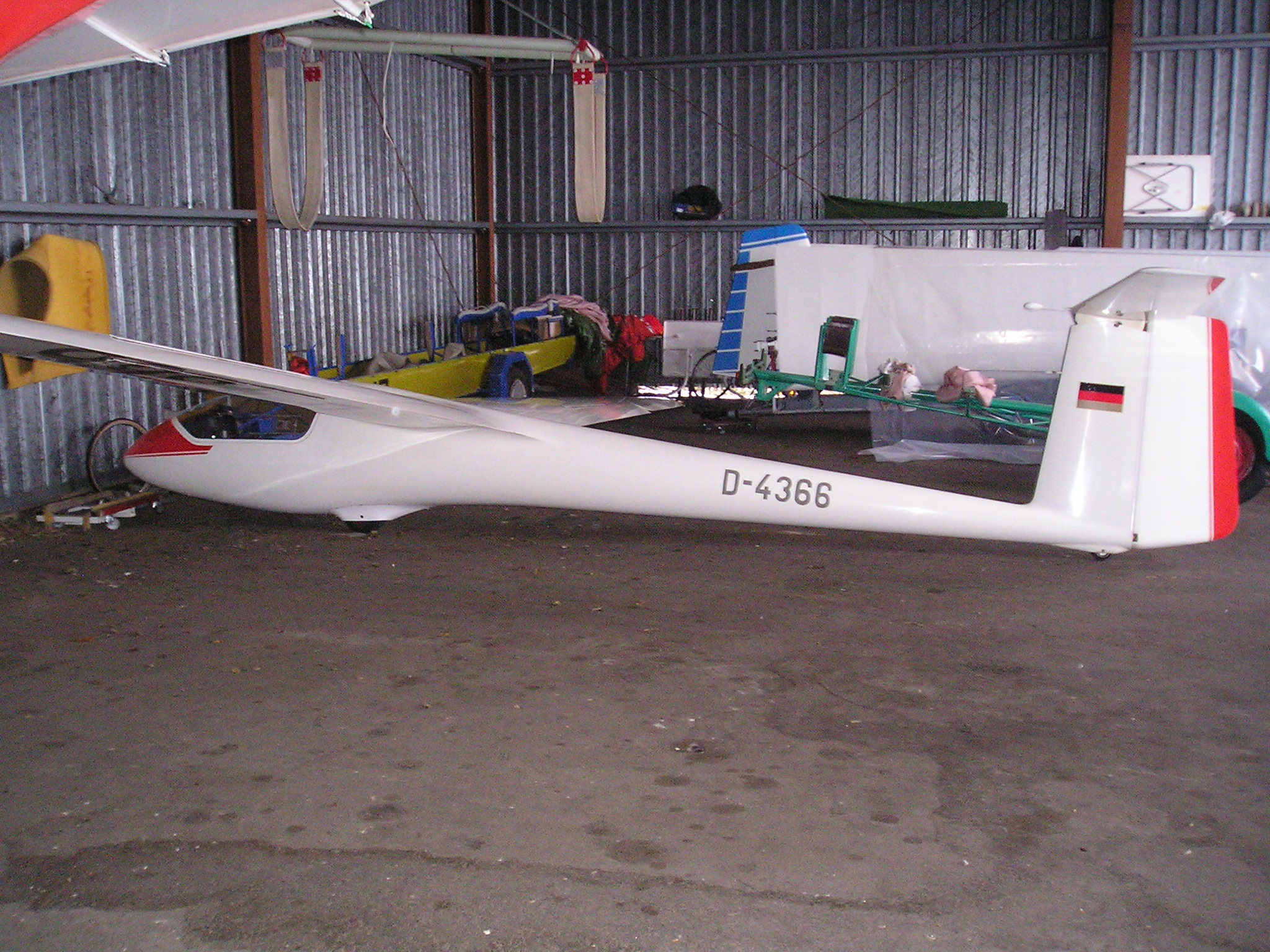

General information
- Type: Single seat Standard Class Sailplane
- National origin: Germany
- Manufacturer: Bölkow GmbH, Munich
- Designer: Eppler and Nägele
- Number built: about 250

History
- First flight: 1964

The Bölkow Phoebus is a glass fibre composite competition sailplane, designed and produced in Germany in the 1960s. Large numbers were built, achieving success at some national contests, and many remain active.

== Design and development ==
The Phoebus was designed at a time when glider manufacturers were moving away from all-wood aircraft towards composite structures. Bölkow had been among the early leaders of this change with their Phönix T sailplane in the late 1950s, which used balsa/glassfibre sandwich construction. The Phoebus was built in the same way.

It is a shoulder wing competition sailplane. The first aircraft, the Phoebus A, was designed to Standard Class rules, with a span of 15 m. Its straight tapered wings have an aspect ratio of 17.1; airbrakes are fitted at 70% chord. The fin and rudder are straight edged and only slightly tapered, with a high aspect ratio all moving T tail. The fuselage is a monocoque with the cockpit, ahead of the wings, enclosed with a one piece canopy. The Phoebus A has a monowheel plus tail bumper undercarriage, but in the later "B" variants the main wheel is retractable. The Phoebus C has a braking parachute.

== Operational history ==
The Phoebus prototype was placed 3rd in the Standard Class at the German national gliding championships of 1964 and 8th at the World Gliding Championships held in the United Kingdom the following year. Production aircraft came 1st and 3rd at the 1966 South African international championships.

Many Phoebus remain registered, particularly in Germany and the United States.

== Variants ==
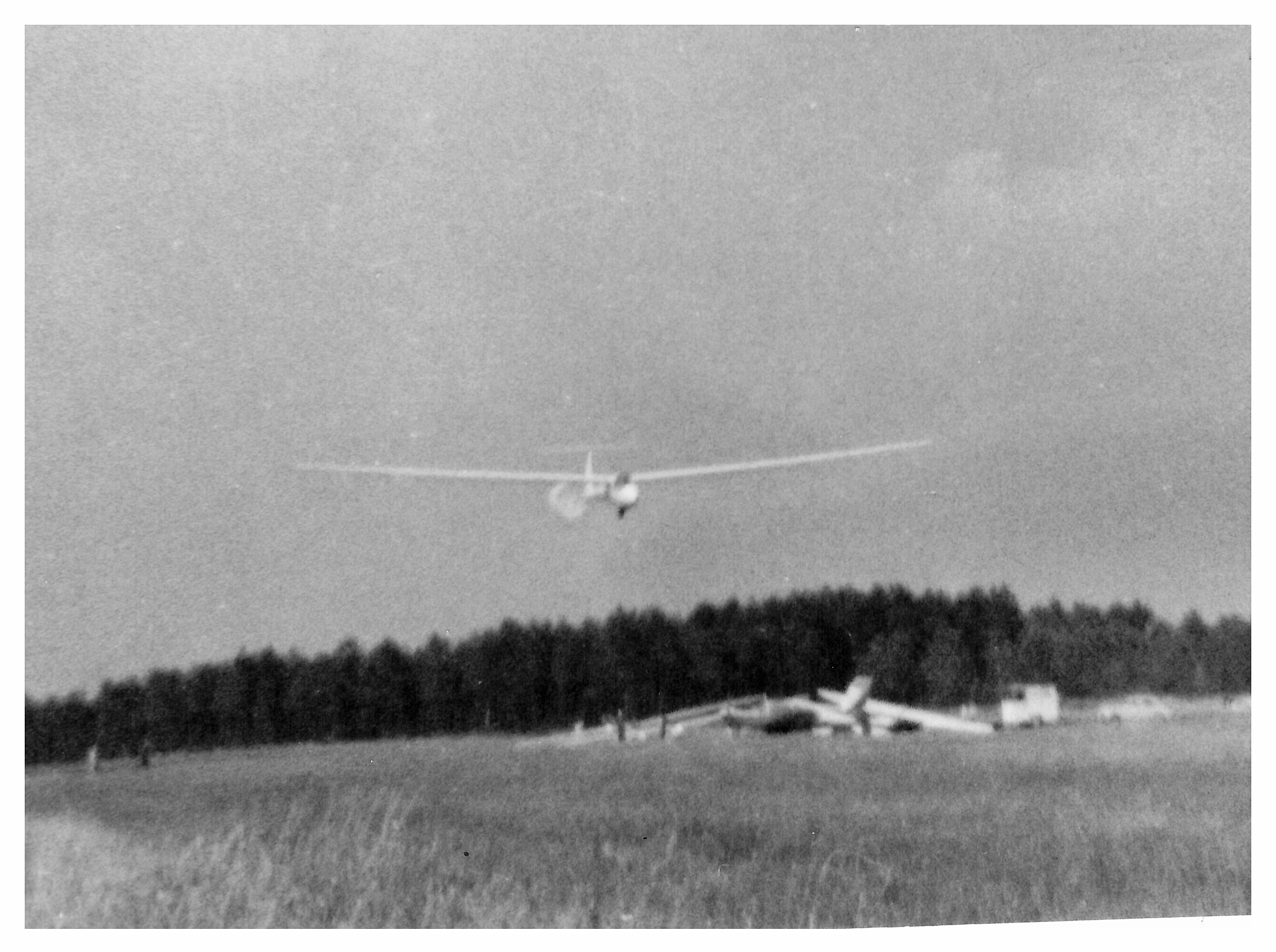
Phoebus C landing. Bordeaux–Saucats (France) circa 1970

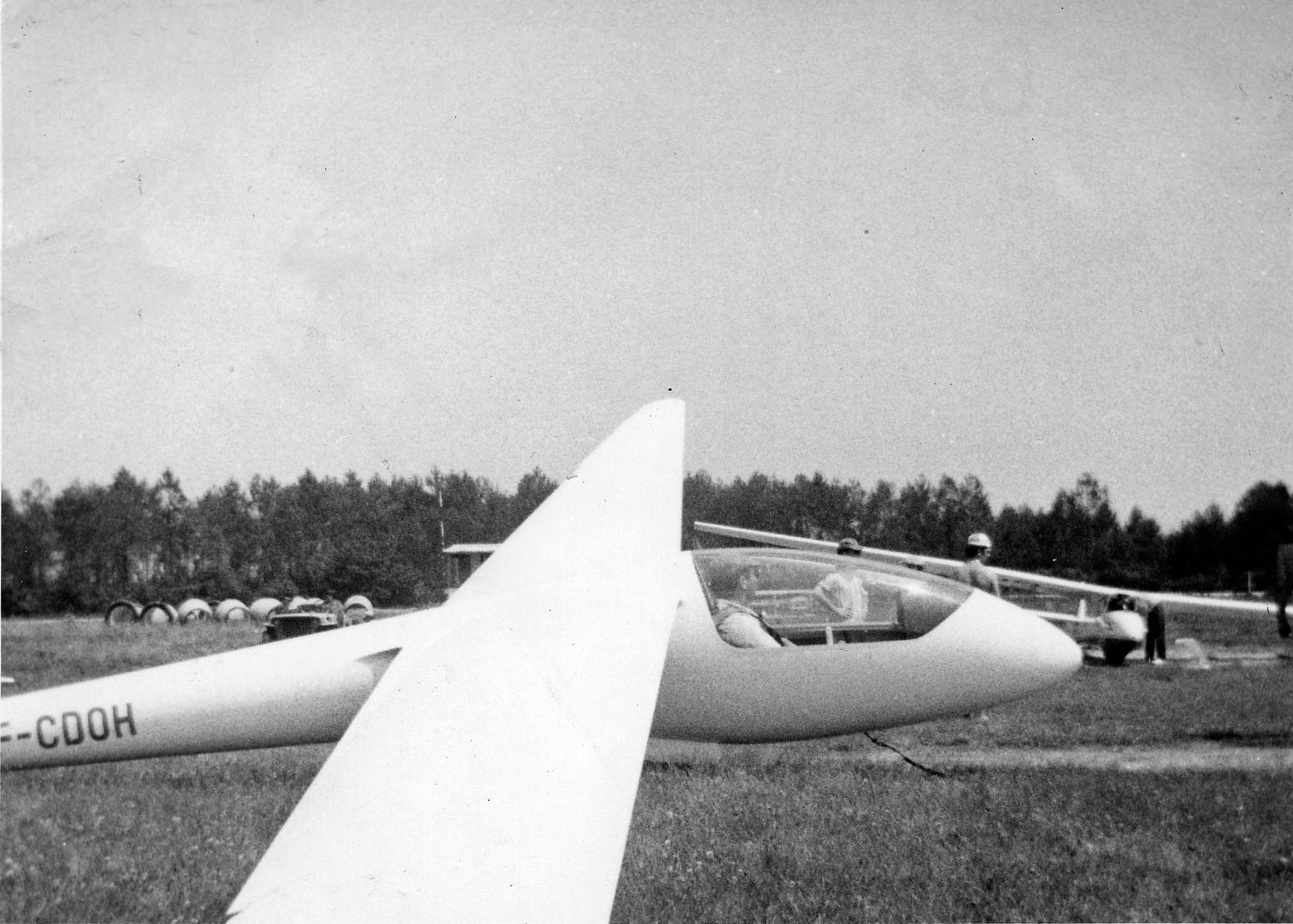
Phoebus C

Phoebus A
1964 15 m span, fixed-gear Standard Class. Discontinued after 1970 FAI rule change.
Phoebus B
1967 15 m span, retractable gear. In 1970 FAI rules changed, allowing retractable undercarriages in Standard Class.
Phoebus C
1967 17 m span, retractable gear, braking parachute. Open Class.

== Specifications (Phoebus A) ==
Data from Jane's All the World's Aircraft 1966/7

General characteristics

- Crew: 1
- Length: 7.10 m (23 ft 4 in)
- Wingspan: 15.0 m (49 ft 3 in)
- Wing area: 13.16 m^{2} (141.7 sq ft)
- Aspect ratio: 17.1
- Airfoil: Eppler 403
- Empty weight: 220 kg (485 lb)
- Max takeoff weight: 350 kg (772 lb)

Performance

- Maximum speed: 200 km/h (120 mph, 110 kn) rough air
- Stall speed: 60 km/h (37 mph, 32 kn)
- Rate of sink: 0.65 m/s (128 ft/min) minimum, at 80 km/h (50 mph)
- Lift-to-drag: best glide ratio, at 90 km/h (56 mph), 37:1

== See also ==
Aircraft of comparable role, configuration, and era

- Glasflügel H-201
- Rolladen-Schneider LS1
- Schempp-Hirth Standard Cirrus
- Schleicher ASW 15
