= ISF Mistral-C =

German single-seat glider, 1976

Mistral
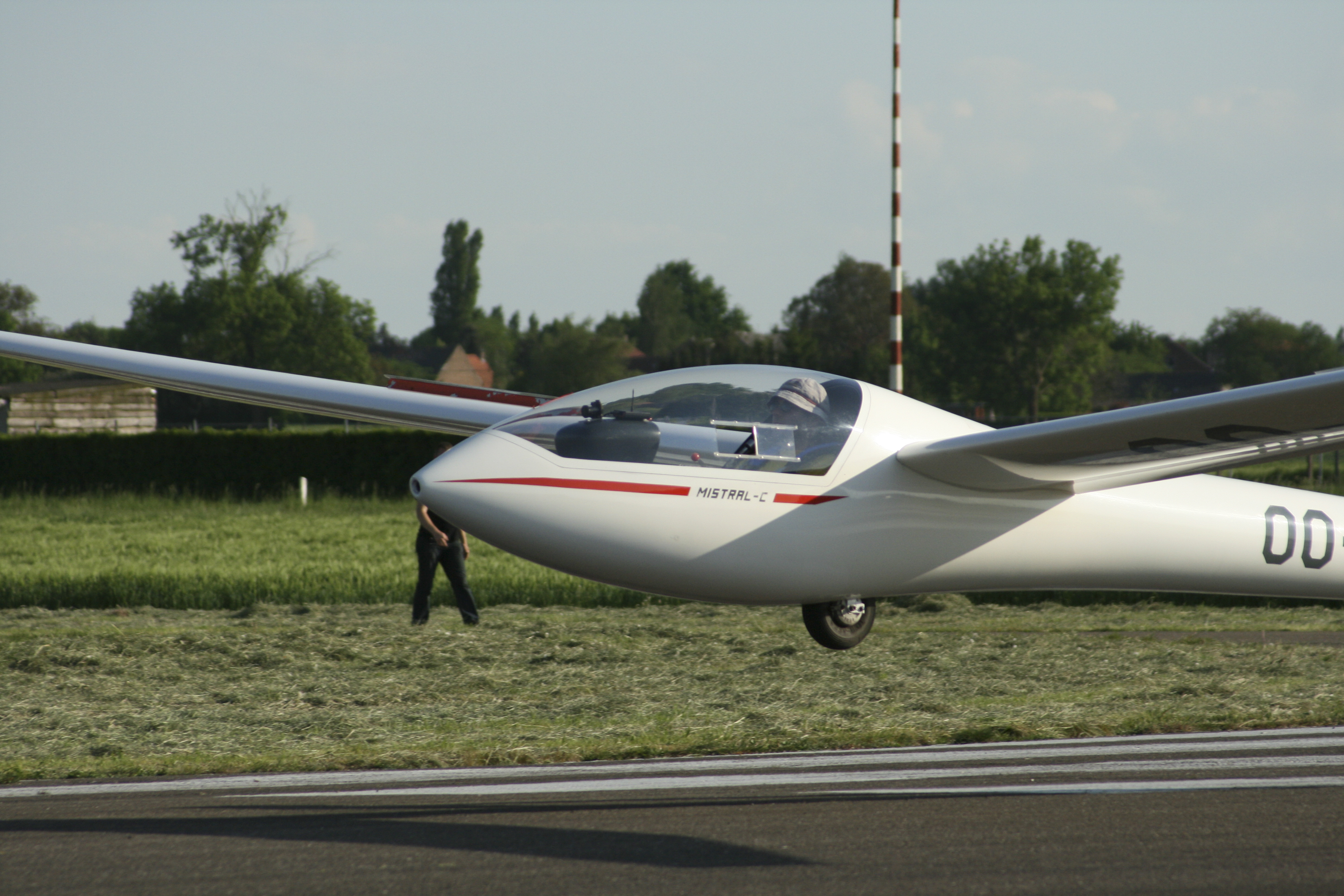
- Mistral-C, airbrakes open for landing

General information
- Type: Single seat Club Class glider
- National origin: Germany
- Manufacturer: Ingenieur-Büro Strauber - Frommhold Gmbh (ISF) initially, then Mistral-Flugzeugbau and finally Valentin Gmbh
- Designer: Manfred Strauber and Hartmut Frommhold
- Number built: 75+

History
- First flight: 21 October 1976

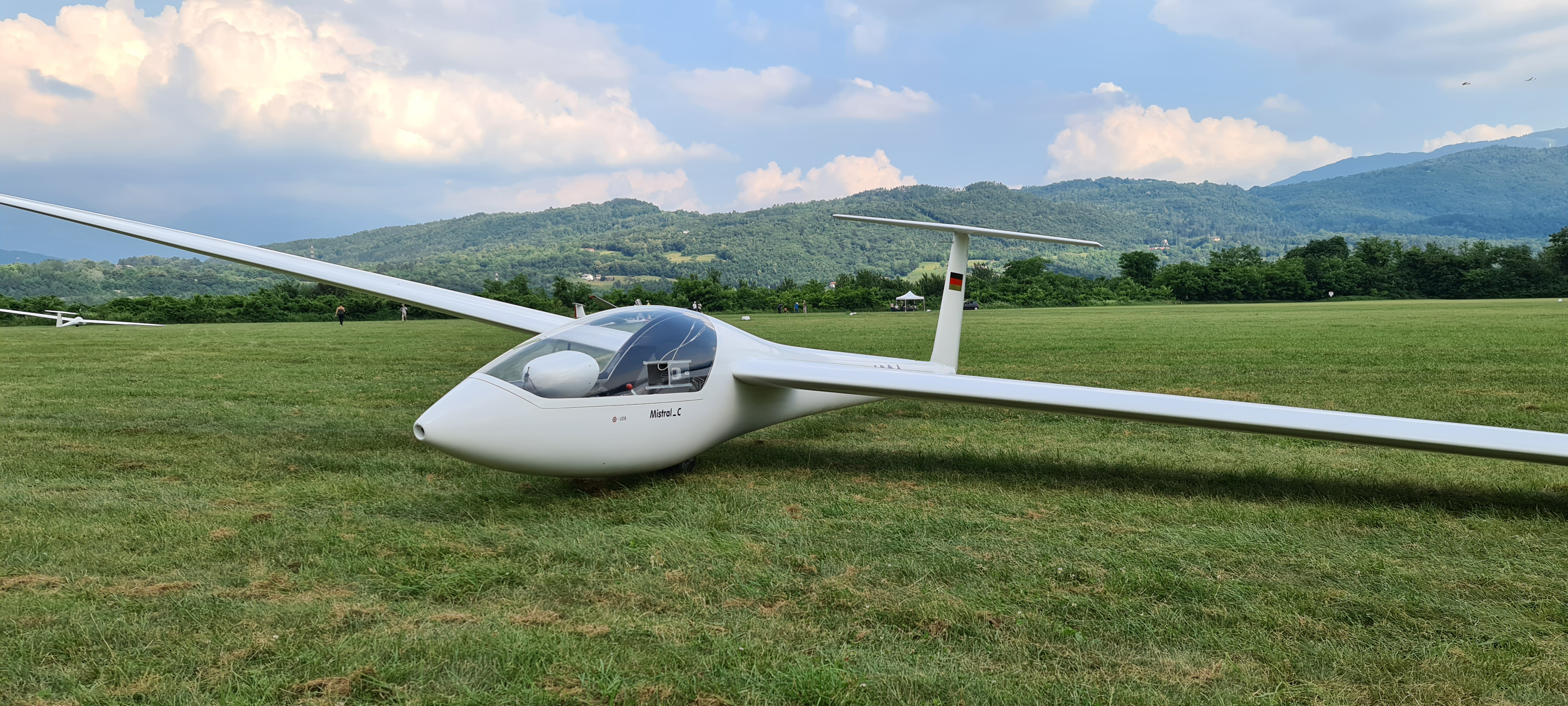

The Mistral-C was one of the first gliders, designed in 1974 to the then new Club Class rules. It was based on the Strauber Mistral, a Standard Class glider flown a year earlier, but with a new wing and built from newer composite materials. Both types were designed and constructed in Germany. More than 75 Mistral-Cs were produced.

== Design and development ==
The immediate precursor of the Mistral-C Club Class glider was the Strauber Mistral high performance Standard Class aircraft designed by Manfred Strauber, Alois Fries, Hartmut Frommhold and Horst Gaber. Design works began in January 1970 and the Mistral made its first flight in July 1975. It was not intended to be serially produced. It was a 15.00 m (49 ft 2.5 in) span shoulder wing monoplane with a T-tail which made much use of glass reinforced plastic (GRP) in its structure. The wings had an area of 9.40 m^{2} (101.2 sq ft), an aspect ratio of 23.9 and sweepback at one quarter chord of 0.4°. The dihedral was also 0.4°. The airfoil sections used were Wortmann FX-66-S-196 at the root and FX-66-S-161 at the tips. The wings were constructed from GRP/balsa sandwich with ailerons of GRP and rigid, closed cell, polymethacrylimide (PMI) foam. Aluminium Schempp-Hirth airbrakes extended from the upper wing surface only. The tail unit, with an all-moving tailplane, was also formed from PMI filled GRP. The fuselage of the Mistral was a pod and boom monocoque made from GRP/balsa sandwich, with the single seat cockpit under a single piece, framed canopy. Its main, single landing wheel was manually retractable and assisted by a tailskid. The Mistral had a best glide angle of 39:1 and a minimum sink speed of 0.6 m/s (118 ft/mim).

In October 1974 the design of a new model was begun by Strauber and Frommhold, now operating as Ingenieur-Büro Strauber - Frommhold Gmbh. This became the Mistral-C or model 2 Mistral-C and was one of the first gliders to meet the specifications of the then new FAI Club Class. It first flew on 21 October 1976. The main changes were to the wings and, overall, to the construction materials. As detailed in the Specification section below, the wing area was increased, though the span was unchanged, reducing the aspect ratio and consequentially the performance. The new wings had different Wortmann sections, quarter chord forward sweep of 1.0° and dihedral 4.30°. GRP/PVC foam sandwich replaced the earlier balsa sandwich in the wings and the ailerons and fuselage were all GRP. As in the wings, the PMI foam in the tail was replaced by PVC and the all moving tail was changed to a fixed tailplane, fitted with a spring tab. The canopy is side-hinged. The Mistral-Cs produced by Valentin were little different, though the dihedral is reported to be 4.20°.

== Operational history ==
The Mistral-C came 3rd out of 33 competitors at the first International Club class competition, held in Sweden in 1979.

In 2010 54 Mistral-Cs were on European civil registers and another 3 were registered in the UK in 2012.

== Variants ==
Stauber Mistral
Original Standard class aircraft.
ISF/MFB/Valentin Model 2 Mistral-C
Club Class version. Revised, lower aspect ratio wing and changes to the constructional materials. ISF built 25 examples by early 1980; MFB an uncertain number in the first half of 1981 and Valentin completed another 50 by the beginning of 1984 at the MFB plant.

== Specifications (Valentin Mistral-C) ==
Performance figures at maximum take-off weight unless indicated

Data from Jane's All the World's Aircraft 1984-85

General characteristics

- Crew: One
- Length: 6.73 m (22 ft 1 in)
- Wingspan: 15.00 m (49 ft 3 in)
- Height: 1.42 m (4 ft 8 in)
- Wing area: 10.85 m^{2} (116.8 sq ft)
- Aspect ratio: 20.7
- Airfoil: Wortmann FX-61-163 at root, FX-60-126 at tip
- Empty weight: 225 kg (496 lb) approximately
- Max takeoff weight: 350 kg (772 lb)

Performance

- Stall speed: 65 km/h (40 mph, 35 kn) at an all-up weight of 295 kg (650 lb)
- Never exceed speed: 250 km/h (160 mph, 130 kn) in smooth air

160 km/h (86 kn; 99 mph) in rough air
160 km/h (86 kn; 99 mph) on aero-tow
130 km/h (70 kn; 81 mph) on winch launch

- g limits: +5.3/-2.65 at 160 km/h (86 kn; 99 mph)
- Maximum glide ratio: 37.5:1 at 95 km/h (51 kn; 59 mph)
- Rate of sink: 0.66 m/s (130 ft/min) minimum, at 80 km/h (43 kn; 50 mph)
- Wing loading: 32.3 kg/m^{2} (6.6 lb/sq ft) max
