= Glasflügel 206 =

German single-seat glider, 1974

206 Hornet
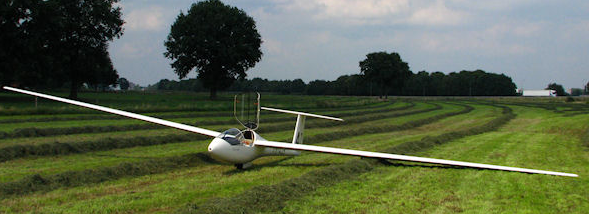

General information
- Type: Standard Class sailplane
- National origin: Germany
- Manufacturer: Glasflügel
- Designer: Eugen Hanle
- Number built: 102 (89 + 13 Hornet C)

History
- First flight: 21 December 1974

The Glasflügel 206 Hornet is a Standard Class sailplane produced in Germany between 1975 and 1979. Of conventional sailplane design with a T-tail, it replaced the Standard Libelle, featuring composite construction throughout. Differences from the earlier aircraft included a redesigned canopy, retractable monowheel landing gear, and provision for 100 kg (220 lbs) of water ballast.

An improved version, the Hornet C was produced in 1979, incorporating a new one-piece canopy originally designed for the Mosquito and an increase in water ballast capacity to 170 kg (375 lb). The wing was also revised, making extensive use of carbon fibre structures to save weight.

== Specifications (206) ==
General characteristics

- Crew: One pilot
- Length: 6.40 m (21 ft 0 in)
- Wingspan: 15.00 m (49 ft 3 in)
- Height: 1.40 m (4 ft 7 in)
- Wing area: 9.8 m^{2} (106 sq ft)
- Aspect ratio: 23
- Empty weight: 227 kg (500 lb)
- Gross weight: 420 kg (920 lb)

Performance

- Maximum speed: 250 km/h (155 mph, 135 kn)
- Maximum glide ratio: 38 at 94km/h without ballast; 38 at 103km/h with ballast
- Rate of sink: 0.6 m/s (120 ft/min)

== See also ==
Aircraft of comparable role, configuration, and era

- Glaser-Dirks DG-100
- Schempp-Hirth Standard Cirrus
- Schleicher ASW 19

Related lists

- List of gliders
