= Glasflügel H-201 =

German single-seat glider, 1967

201 Libelle
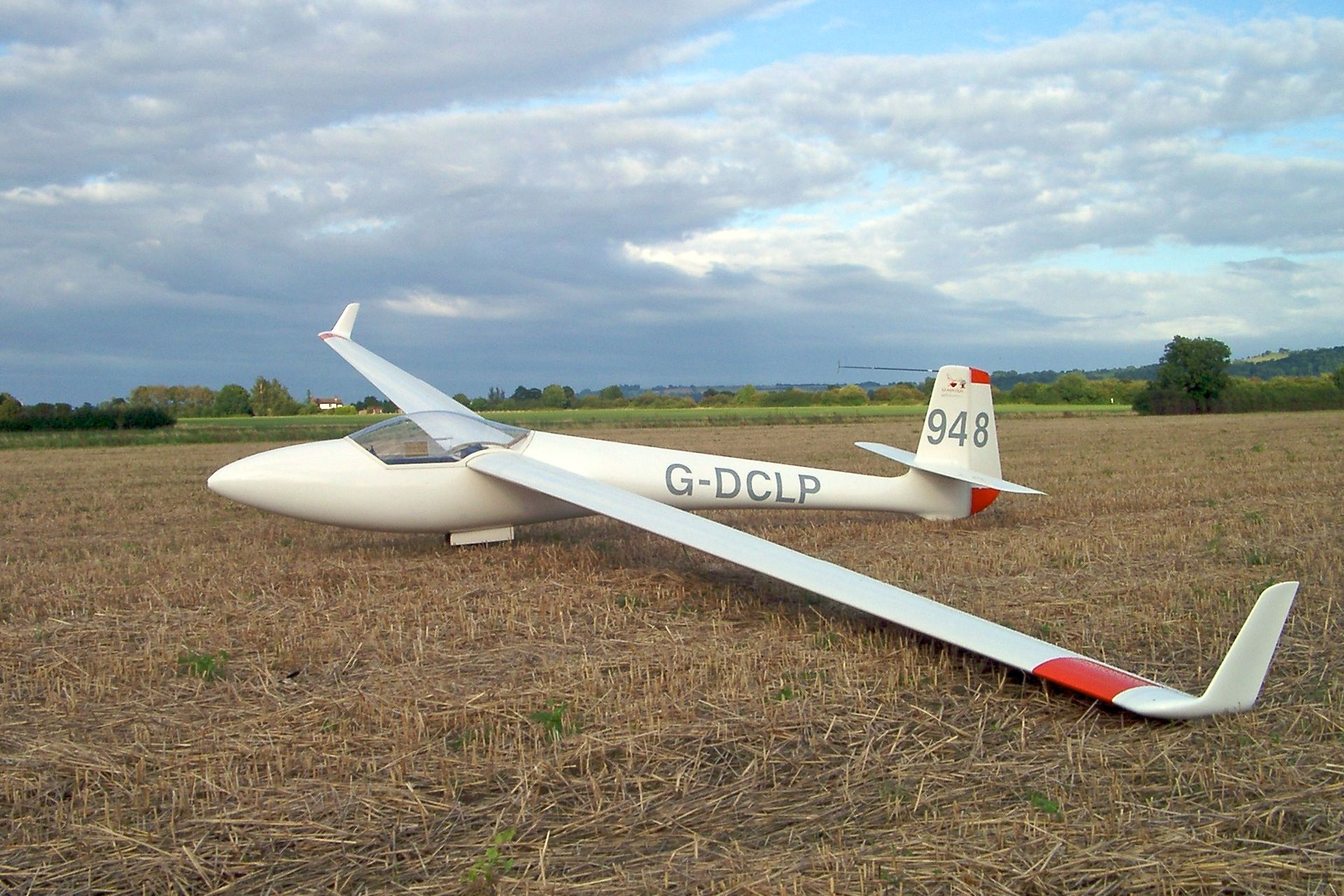
- Glasflügel 201 Standard Libelle

General information
- Type: Standard-class sailplane
- National origin: Germany
- Manufacturer: Glasflügel
- Number built: 601

History
- First flight: October 1967
- Developed from: H-301 Open Class Libelle

The Glasflügel 201 Standard Libelle (German: "Dragonfly") is an early composite Standard Class single-seat sailplane produced by Glasflügel from 1967.

== Development ==
The 201 was a Standard Class sailplane that was a successor to the H-301 Libelle Open Class glider. It was similar to the H-301, with modifications to meet the Standard Class requirements. The prototype made its first flight in October 1967, with a total of 601 being built. The type soon made its mark in contest flying; one flown by Per-Axel Persson of Sweden, winner of the 1948 World Championships, came second in the Standard Class at the 1968 World Championships at Leszno in Poland.

The Libelle and Standard Libelle were very popular and influential designs. Their very light wings and extremely easy rigging set a new benchmark. Their handling is generally good.

The 201 was superseded by the Glasflügel 206 Hornet.

== Design ==
The Standard Libelle (201) is of similar glassfibre construction to the H-301 Libelle. The changes included removing the flaps and tail braking parachute, fitting a fixed, instead of retractable, monowheel, and raising the height of the canopy. A new Wortmann wing section was featured and terminal velocity dive brakes were fitted.

With a change in the Standard Class rules, the 201B of 1969 introduced a retractable monowheel; a water ballast system was available as an option, with one 25-litre bag per wing located in front of the spar, with valve and dumping orifice on the fuselage underside. Other improvements in the B variant were moving from upper and lower air brakes to only longer upper surface brakes, a larger stabilizer for better low-speed handling, PVC foam sandwich core for the wing (instead of balsa) to increase durability and profile accuracy, increased maximum weight and higher operating speeds.

The canopy is unique in that it has a catch that enables the front to be raised by 25mm (about 1 inch) in flight to provide a blast of ventilating air instead of the more conventional small sliding panel used for this purpose.

The connections for airbrakes and elevator are automatic. The aileron connections are manually connected with special pins. Care is needed to ensure the pins are pushed in and locked at the bottom as they have been known, in rare cases, to come loose if not installed correctly.

== Variants ==
- Glasflügel 202 (1 built)
- Glasflügel 203 (2 built)
- Glasflügel 204 (1 built)
- Glasflügel 205 Club Libelle with a high-wing, T-tail and fixed undercarriage intended for rental and club use. (171 built)
- Z-15: Brazilian Air Force designation of the Glasflügel 201B.

== Specifications (201B) ==

General characteristics

- Crew: One pilot
- Capacity: 50 kg (110 lb) water ballast
- Length: 6.19 m (20 ft 4 in)
- Wingspan: 15.00 m (49 ft 3 in)
- Height: 1.25 m (4 ft 1 in)
- Wing area: 9.8 m^{2} (105 sq ft)
- Aspect ratio: 23
- Empty weight: 185 kg (407 lb)
- Gross weight: 350 kg (770 lb)

Performance

- Maximum speed: 250 km/h (160 mph, 140 kn)
- Maximum glide ratio: ca. 36
- Rate of sink: 0.57 m/s (112 ft/min)

== See also ==
Related development

- Glasflügel 205 Club Libelle

Aircraft of comparable role, configuration, and era

- Bölkow Phoebus
- Rolladen-Schneider LS1
- Schempp-Hirth Standard Cirrus
- Schleicher ASW 15

Related lists

- List of gliders
