= Glasflügel 303 =

German single-seat glider first flown in 1976

303
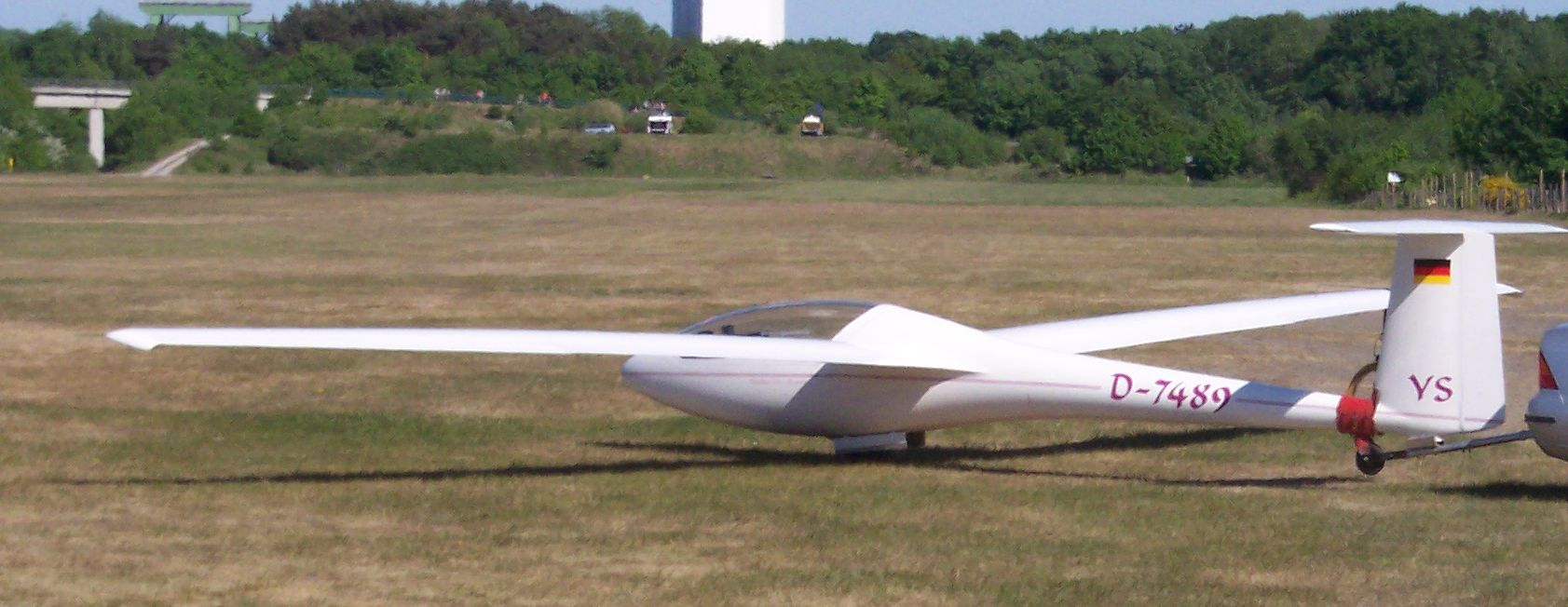

General information
- Type: 15 metre class sailplane
- National origin: Germany
- Manufacturer: Glasflügel
- Number built: 202

History
- First flight: 1976

The Glasflügel 303 Mosquito is a composite 15 metre Class single-seat sailplane manufactured by Glasflügel between 1976 and 1980.

== Design and development ==
Designed for the 15 metre racing class, the Mosquito married the Standard Class Hornet fuselage with a flapped wing employing the then widely-used FX 67-K-170 airfoil developed at the University of Stuttgart by Professor Franz Wortmann. The Mosquito had a new design of one-piece canopy rather than the two-piece canopy used on the Hornet.

This profile and its sister profile FX 67-K-150 are among the most prolific in the history of gliding, as they were employed also in the Nimbus-2, Mini-Nimbus, DG-200 and DG-400, PIK-20, Kestrel, Mosquito, Vega, Jantar and LAK-12 among other types.

The 303 wing featured innovative interconnected trailing edge dive brakes-variable camber flaps. The glider had automatic connection for all controls: ailerons, elevator, air brakes and water ballast. The Mosquito also uses a pneumatic tail wheel rather than a skid. It was available with a tow release in both the nose and near the centre of gravity; in-flight adjustable rudder pedals and seat back. A lever bar to aid in assembly was also employed. A larger than common retractable main wheel with drum brake is also a nice feature, however the brake lever located in the seat pan behind the joy stick is slightly inconvenient. This main wheel brake lever was deleted in favor of rudder pedal heel brake actuation in the B model.

The maiden flight of the Mosquito took place in 1976. It is by all accounts a nice-handling, comfortable and pleasing aircraft, but a little less performing than the contemporaneous Rolladen-Schneider LS3 and ASW 20. Therefore, the Mosquito (and the Schempp-Hirth Mini-Nimbus that shares the same wing) did not do well in top-level competition, neither did it find the large commercial success of the Libelle. The Mosquito was superseded in 1980 by the Glasflügel 304.

== Aircraft on display ==
- US Southwest Soaring Museum

== Specifications ==
General characteristics

- Crew: One pilot
- Capacity: 125 kg (275 lb) water ballast
- Length: 6.40 m (21 ft 0 in)
- Wingspan: 15.00 m (49 ft 3 in)
- Height: 1.40 m (4 ft 7 in)
- Wing area: 9.86 m^{2} (106 sq ft)
- Aspect ratio: 22.8
- Empty weight: 242 kg (532 lb)
- Gross weight: 450 kg (990 lb)

Performance

- Maximum speed: 250 km/h (160 mph, 140 kn)
- Maximum glide ratio: 39
- Rate of sink: 0.50 m/s (100 ft/min)

== See also ==
Aircraft of comparable role, configuration, and era

- Schempp-Hirth Mini-Nimbus

Related lists

- List of gliders
