= Schempp-Hirth Standard Cirrus =

German single-seat glider, 1969

Standard Cirrus
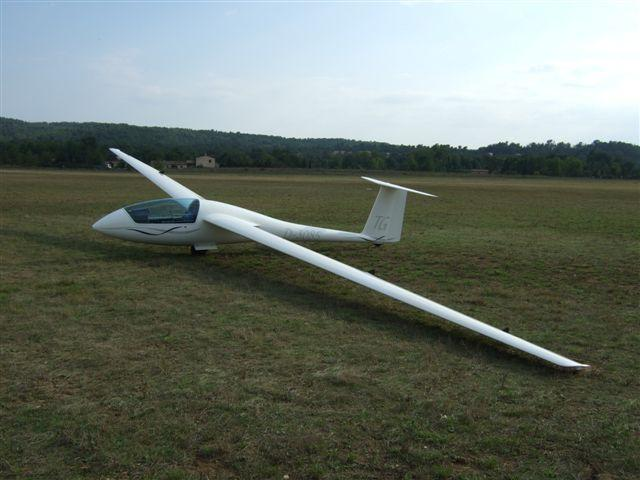

General information
- Type: Standard-class sailplane
- National origin: Germany
- Manufacturer: Schempp-Hirth
- Designer: Klaus Holighaus
- Number built: ca. 838

History
- First flight: 20 February 1969

The Standard Cirrus is a Standard-class glider built in Germany by Schempp-Hirth. The Standard Cirrus was produced between 1969 and 1985, when the Discus replaced it. Over 800 examples were built, making it one of the most successful early fibreglass glider designs.

== Development ==
Dipl Ing designed the Standard Cirrus. Klaus Holighaus flew for the first time in February 1969. It is a Standard Class glider with a 15-metre span and laminar-flow airfoil section designed by Professor Franz Wortmann. The all-moving tailplane, a feature of many designs of that period due to its theoretically higher efficiency, caused less than desirable high-speed stability characteristics, so modifications were made to the early design. The aircraft built before 1972 have a washout of -0.75 degrees. The washout was then increased to -1.5 degrees, improving low-speed performance and slow-speed response.

Improvements were made to the Standard Cirrus 75. These included better air brakes with an increased frontal area and a safer tailplane attachment system. By April 1977, when production of Schempp-Hirth ended, 700 Standard Cirruses had been built, including 200 built under licence by Grob between 1972 and July 1975. A French firm, Lanaverre Industrie, had also built 38 Standard Cirruses under licence by 1979. VTC of Yugoslavia also licensed-built Standard Cirruses, reaching approximately 100 by 1985.

== Variants ==
Baby Cirrus

The Baby Cirrus is similar to a Standard Cirrus 75. The only difference is that the Baby Cirrus had its wing on top of the fuselage, mounted on a fiberglass beam of some sort. Only one was made. It was primarily used to try to improve the design of the Standard Cirrus. The original registration was D-3111. It was later converted to a Standard Cirrus 75 and was given a new registration. It is still flying to this day and is owned by a club in Germany.

Cirrus B

The Cirrus B is based on the Standard Cirrus 75 but with interchangeable wingtips, giving a span of either 15m or 16m.

Cirrus K

The two Cirrus K have a reduced span (12.6m), larger ailerons, a cross tail with a larger elevator, and a strengthened fuselage, which makes them suitable for aerobatics. This modification was initiated by Wilhelm Düerkop in the late 1980s. Wolfgang Seitz participated in the 1995 World Glider Aerobatic Championships with a Cirrus K.

G/81

The last Cirrus model was the G/81 built by VTC until 1985. This incorporated a longer fuselage and canopy and a conventional tailplane and elevator with the wings of the Cirrus 75.

== Specifications ==
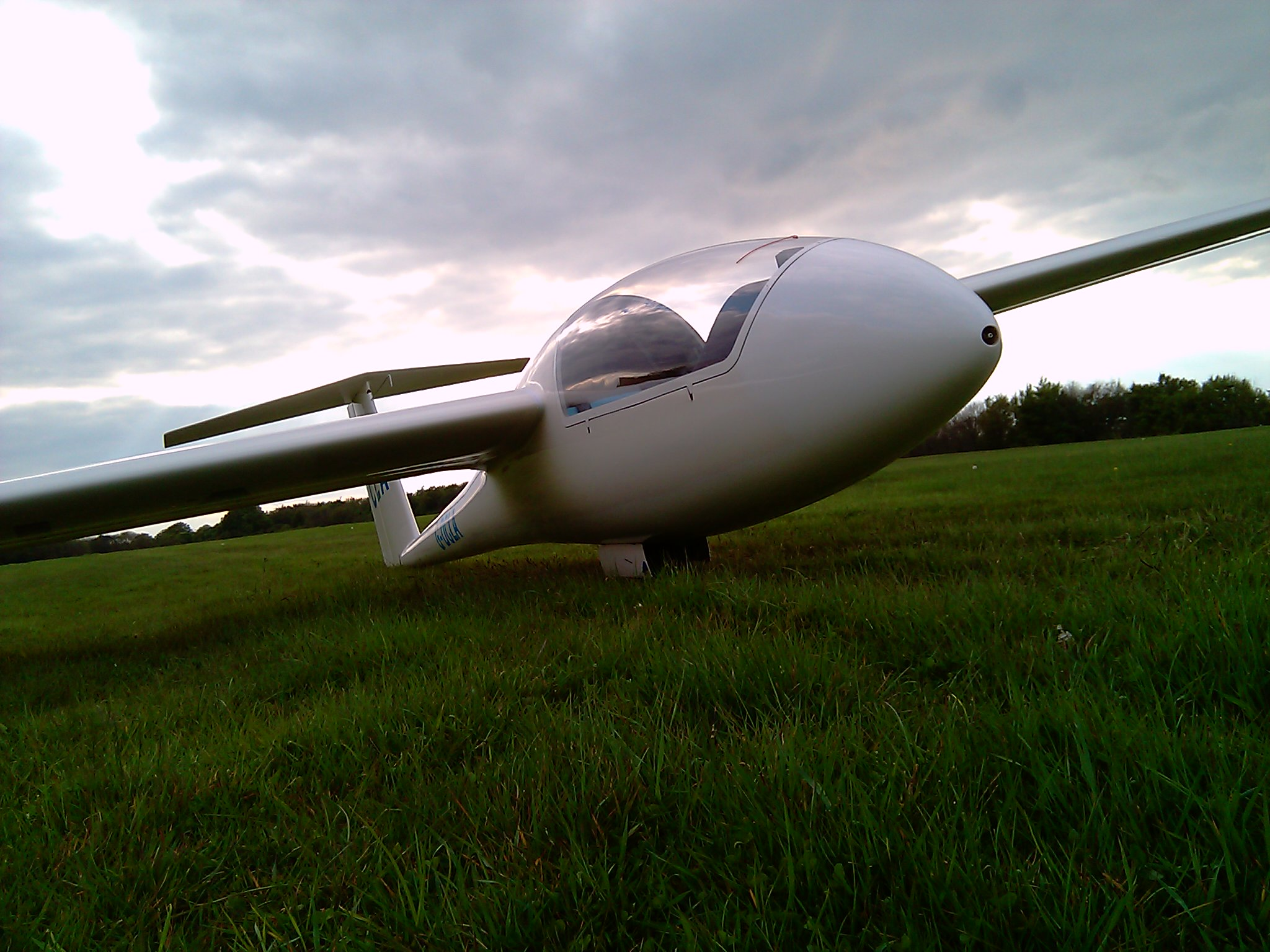
Standard Cirrus glider

Data from Jane's all the World's Aircraft 1976–77

General characteristics

- Crew: 1
- Capacity: 80 kg (180 lb) water ballast
- Length: 6.35 m (20 ft 10 in)
- Wingspan: 15 m (49 ft 3 in)
- Height: 1.32 m (4 ft 4 in)
- Wing area: 10 m^{2} (110 sq ft)
- Aspect ratio: 22.5
- Airfoil: root: Wortmann S-02-196 (19.6%); tip: Wortmann FX 66-17A II 182 (17%)
- Empty weight: 215 kg (474 lb)
- Max takeoff weight: 390 kg (860 lb) with water ballast

330 kg (730 lb) without water ballast

Performance

- Stall speed: 62 km/h (39 mph, 33 kn)
- Never exceed speed: 220 km/h (140 mph, 120 kn)
- Max aerotow speed: 150 km/h (93 mph; 81 kn)
- Max winch launch speed: 120 km/h (75 mph; 65 kn)
- g limits: +10
- Maximum glide ratio: 38.5:1 at 90 km/h (56 mph; 49 kn)
- Rate of sink: 0.6 m/s (120 ft/min) at 71 km/h (44 mph; 38 kn)
- Wing loading: 39 kg/m^{2} (8.0 lb/sq ft) with water ballast

33 kg/m^{2} (6.8 lb/sq ft) without water ballast

== See also ==
Related development

- Schempp-Hirth Discus

Aircraft of comparable role, configuration, and era

- Bölkow Phoebus
- Glasflügel H-201 Standard Libelle
- Rolladen-Schneider LS1
- Schleicher ASW 15

Related lists

- List of gliders
