= FVA-20 F. B. Schmetz =

German single-seat glider, 1979

General information
- Type: Single seat Standard Class sailplane
- National origin: Germany
- Manufacturer: Flugwissenschaftliche vereinigung Aachen
- Number built: 1

History
- First flight: 28 November 1979

The FVA-20 F. B. Schmetz was a single seat, Standard Class sailplane, built as a one-off aircraft, to explore the application of glass fibre to glider construction. Built over a long period, it finally flew in late 1979.

== Design and development ==
The FVA-20 F. B. Schmetz was named after the prominent German glider builder and designer Ferdinand Schmetz. He had been an active builder before World War II and by 1950 was involved in the design of the HKS-1, an advanced sailplane intended to return Germany to the front of world glider development.

The FVA-20 was designed in 1967 to investigate the then-new glass fibre construction methods. Building began in 1969 but the FVA-20 did not fly until 28 November 1979. It was a single seat Standard Class sailplane, with shoulder wings that were built from glass-reinforced plastic (GRP)/Conticell sandwich. GRP ailerons were used and there were Schempp-Hirth spoilers, each pair extending out of its wing above and below on frames like parallel rulers.

Its fuselage was built from GRP/balsa sandwich. The FVA-20 had a T-tail, their planes built as those of the wings. The tailplane was fixed, carrying elevators fitted with Háhnle trim tabs. Its single seat cockpit was enclosed by a single-piece, forward hinged canopy. It landed on a retractable, unsprung, monowheel undercarriage aided by a tail bumper. The mainwheel had a foot-operated brake.

Flight testing in 1980 revealed some aileron flutter problems. It was hoped that these would be eliminated by the replacement, during 1982, of the original GRP ailerons by lighter carbon fiber reinforced plastic (CRP) versions.

== Specifications ==
Data from Jane's All the World's Aircraft 1981/2

General characteristics

- Crew: 1
- Length: 7.00 m (23 ft 0 in)
- Wingspan: 15.00 m (49 ft 3 in)
- Height: 0.90 m (2 ft 11 in) over fuselage
- Wing area: 12.80 m^{2} (137.8 sq ft)
- Aspect ratio: 17.6
- Airfoil: Wortmann FX 161-168 at root, FX 606-126 at tip
- Empty weight: 280 kg (617 lb)
- Max takeoff weight: 380 kg (838 lb)

Performance

- Maximum speed: 250 km/h (160 mph, 130 kn) smooth air
- Stall speed: 62 km/h (39 mph, 33 kn)
- g limits: +6
- Maximum glide ratio: 37 best at 90 km/h (56 mph; 49 kn)
- Rate of sink: 0.6 m/s (120 ft/min) minimum, at 68 km/h (43 mph; 37 kn)
- Wing loading: 29.7 kg/m^{2} (6.1 lb/sq ft)

== See also ==
Related development

- HKS-3
- Schempp-Hirth SHK
- Standard Austria

Aircraft of comparable role, configuration, and era Schleicher K6E Related lists List of gliders
