= Schempp-Hirth Janus =

German two-seat glider, 1974

Janus
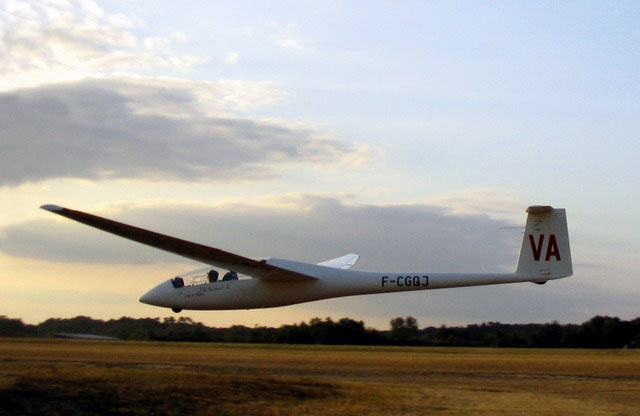
- Janus Ce

General information
- Type: Two Seater-class sailplane
- National origin: Germany
- Manufacturer: Schempp-Hirth
- Designer: Klaus Holighaus
- Number built: 300

History
- First flight: May 1974

The Schempp-Hirth Janus is a high performance two-seat glider that was built by Schempp-Hirth GmbH. It was the first high-performance two-seater.

== Design and development ==
The design was by Dipl-Ing Klaus Holighaus and the prototype first flew in May 1974. The production examples incorporated several improvements in January 1975. The Janus has a glass-fibre monocoque fuselage similar to that of the Nimbus-2 but the cockpit section is lengthened to accommodate the two pilots in tandem with dual controls under a right-hand side-hinged one-piece canopy. Landing gear consists of either a non-retractable main wheel (Janus A, B & C) or a retractable main wheel (later models of Janus C and all Ce's) with a drum or disc brake, and a nose-wheel. The two-piece wings have 2° forward sweep on the leading edge, and have camber-changing flaps which are operated between +12° and −7°. The Janus has upper-surface airbrakes, and although uncommon the Janus C could also be fitted with a tail parachute.

The Janus was superseded by the unflapped Duo Discus which first flew in 1993; and the flapped Arcus which first flew in 2009.

=== Production ===
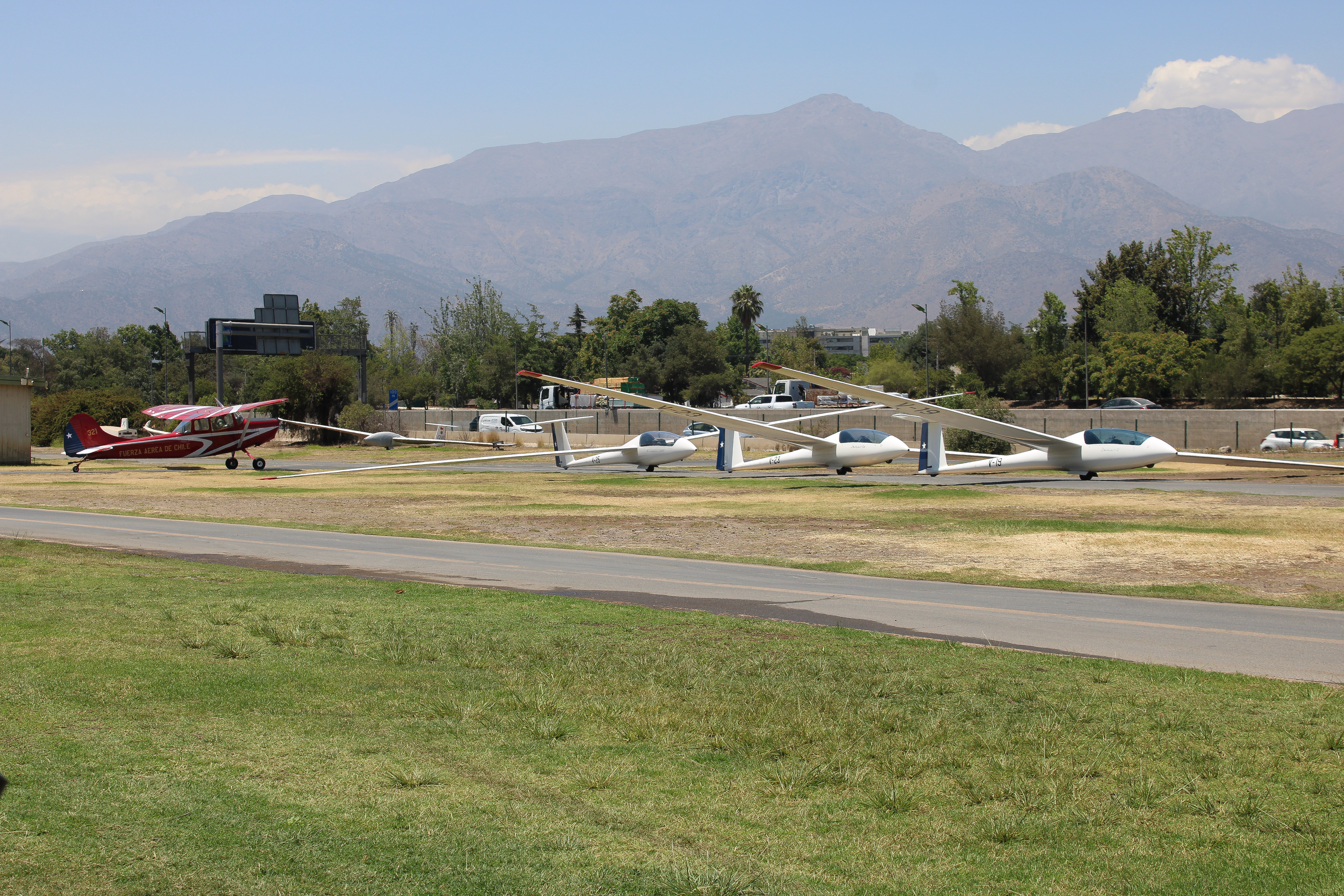
Group Of Chilean Airforce Schempp-Hirth Janus

100 Januses were built by early 1980 plus three motorised Janus CMs. It is particularly suitable for instruction in cross-country flying in gliders with wing flaps.

== Variants ==
Janus A
Janus B
The Janus B was produced from March 1978. It has a fixed-incidence tailplane instead of the all-moving type previously fitted.
Janus C
The Janus C has carbon-fibre wings of 20 m span and a carbon-fibre tailplane.
Janus Ce
The Janus Ce was certified in 1991 and incorporated modifications to the cockpit and fin.
Janus CM
motorised version with Rotax 535C engine
Janus CT
motorised version with Solo 2350 engine
Janus M
a motorised version with a Rotax engine mounted on a pylon aft of the cockpit and retracting into the fuselage. The prototype first flew in 1978.
SCAP–Lanaverre SL-2
The French developed the Janus as the SCAP–Lanaverre SL-2. (SCAP - Société de Commercialisation Aéronautique du Plessis SàRL) with Lanaverre Industries, It first flew in 1977. The main differences from the Janus A are the provision for water ballast in the wings, a fixed tailplane with elevators, and a more comfortable cockpit.

== Specifications (Janus C) ==
Data from Jane's All the World's Aircraft 1988-89

General characteristics

- Crew: 2
- Capacity: 2
- Length: 8.62 m (28 ft 3 in)
- Wingspan: 20 m (65 ft 7 in)
- Height: 1.45 m (4 ft 9 in)
- Wing area: 17.4 m^{2} (187 sq ft)
- Aspect ratio: 23
- Airfoil: root:Wortmann FX-67-K-170; tip:Wortmann FX-67-K-15
- Empty weight: 355 kg (783 lb)
- Max takeoff weight: 700 kg (1,543 lb)
- Water ballast: 200–240 L (53–63 US gal; 44–53 imp gal)

Performance

- Stall speed: 70 km/h (43 mph, 38 kn)
- Never exceed speed: 250 km/h (160 mph, 130 kn) ::::180 km/h (97 kn; 110 mph) on aero-tow

150 km/h (81 kn; 93 mph) on winch launch

- g limits: +5.3 -2.65
- Maximum glide ratio: 43.5 at 110 km/h (59 kn; 68 mph) at 36.5 kg/m^{2} (7.5 lb/sq ft) wing loading
- Rate of sink: 0.6 m/s (120 ft/min) at 90 km/h (49 kn; 56 mph) at 36.5 kg/m^{2} (7.5 lb/sq ft) wing loading
- Wing loading: 40 kg/m^{2} (8.2 lb/sq ft) max

== See also ==
Aircraft of comparable role, configuration, and era

- Glaser-Dirks DG-500

Related lists

- List of gliders
