= Schempp-Hirth HS-3 Nimbus =

Nimbus

General information
- Type: Open-class sailplane
- National origin: Germany
- Manufacturer: Schempp-Hirth
- Designer: Klaus Holighaus
- Number built: 1

History
- First flight: January 1969

The Schempp-Hirth HS-3 Nimbus was a prototype glider built by Klaus Holighaus.

The HS-3 Nimbus was a high performance single-seater. Holighaus designed and built this prototype glider in his spare time with assistance from Schempp-Hirth. Strictly speaking, it is not a Schempp-Hirth glider but rather a glider built at Schempp-Hirth.

It employed the same fuselage as the Open Class Cirrus and a similar tail, but had an entirely new wing, high-set and in three segments adding up to a 22 m (72 ft) span. The prototype first flew in January 1969.

The Nimbus had a rudder far too small for an aircraft of its size, leading to very unfavourable control characteristics; After the pilot applied full aileron and rudder inputs, the glider continued to fly straight ahead for several seconds before suddenly dropping a wing, requiring full opposite controls to recover. No air brakes were fitted and it was an exceptionally difficult glider to land. It was damaged several times in overshoots. However, it had an exceptionally high performance for the time, with a best glide ratio of 51:1 at 90 km/h (56 mph) and a minimum sink rate of only 0.43 m/s (1.4 ft/s).

George Moffat of the USA flew the Nimbus in the 1970 World Gliding Championships at Marfa, Texas. He had to modify the aircraft's cockpit to fit in, and became the first person to sample its spin characteristics when, in mid-competition, the glider departed from a steep turn into autorotation with asymmetric water ballast. While considering bailing out, he remembered that the spin of the similar Akaflieg Darmstadt D36 could be tamed by rocking the stick back and forth violently. Flexing the wings caused the angle of attack to change and recovery eventually ensued. In spite of these difficulties, Moffat and the Nimbus won the World Championship.

The production version of the Nimbus was the Schempp-Hirth Nimbus-2.

== Specifications ==
Data from Sailplanes 1965–2000.

General characteristics

- Crew: 1
- Capacity: 110 kg (240 lb) water ballast
- Length: 7.3 m (23 ft 11 in)
- Wingspan: 22 m (72 ft 2 in)
- Height: 1.53 m (5 ft 0 in)
- Wing area: 15.8 m^{2} (170 sq ft)
- Aspect ratio: 30.6
- Airfoil: root: Wortmann FX67-K-170; tip: Wortmann FX67-K-150
- Empty weight: 370 kg (816 lb)
- Gross weight: 500 kg (1,102 lb)

Performance

- Maximum glide ratio: 51:1 at 90 km/h (56 mph; 49 kn)
- Rate of sink: 0.43 m/s (85 ft/min)
- Wing loading: 28.6 kg/m^{2} (5.9 lb/sq ft) to 32 kg/m^{2} (6.6 lb/sq ft)
