= Schempp-Hirth Mini-Nimbus =

German single-seat glider, 1976

Mini-Nimbus
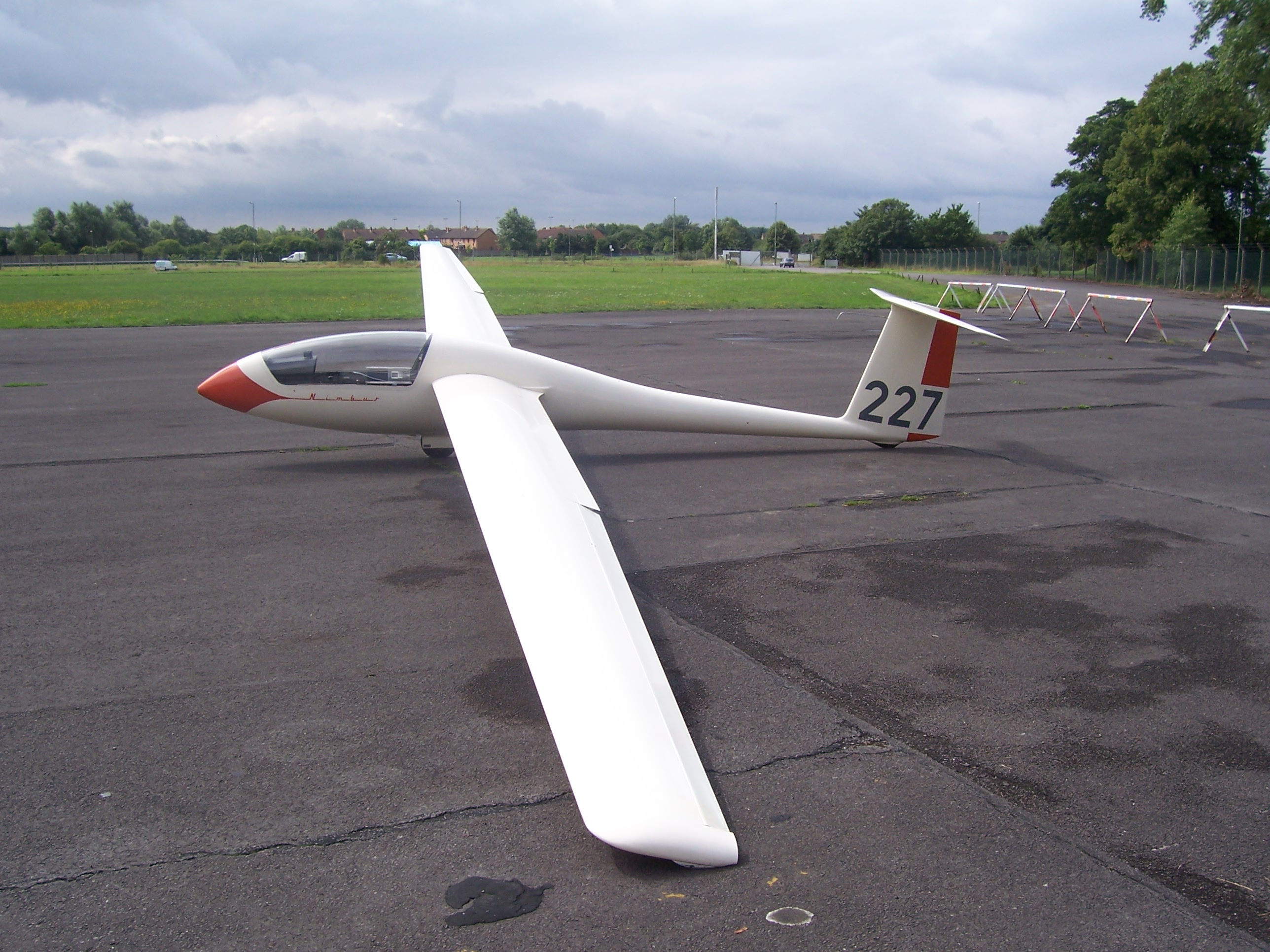
- Mini Nimbus HS-7

General information
- Type: 15 Metre class sailplane
- National origin: Germany
- Manufacturer: Schempp-Hirth
- Designer: Klaus Holighaus
- Number built: 159

History
- First flight: 18 September 1976

The Schempp-Hirth Mini Nimbus is a 15 Metre-class glider designed and built by Schempp-Hirth GmbH in the late 1970s.

== Design and development ==
In designing the Mini-Nimbus, Klaus Holighaus incorporated the flapped wings from the Glasflügel 303 Mosquito, with the fuselage of the Standard Cirrus. The wings feature trailing edge terminal speed dive brakes-variable camber flaps that limit the vertical dive speed to a maximum of 70 knots when the dive brakes are fully deployed.

The name "Mini Nimbus" was adopted to distinguish it from longer-wingspan Nimbus models. It first flew on 18 September 1976.

The Mini Nimbus range all feature self-connecting controls, of Glasflügel design, for added safety and ease of rigging, and have been incorporated in all newer Schempp-Hirth models. The trim lever is connected to the flap operating rod and needs to be set only once per flight; thereafter changes in flap setting (-7 to +10 degrees) automatically provides trim compensation.

=== Variants ===
Based on the Standard Cirrus, the original Mini-Nimbus HS-7 design had an all-moving tailplane and fibre glass wing spars. A tailplane anti-balance tab was a required modification for certification in the United Kingdom after flight testing by Derek Piggott on behalf of the British Gliding Association revealed very low stick forces and marginal pitch stability of the HS-7 version. A conventional tail was added for the Mini-Nimbus B version. The conventional horizontal stabiliser/elevator configuration was less sensitive to inputs by the pilot making it easier to fly without constantly making small adjustments to the pitch attitude. This was due to the much larger control surface of the former compared to the later configuration.

The Mini-Nimbus C version had an increased maximum takeoff weight. Additionally, lighter weight wings with spars and shells of carbon-fibre was available as an option for the C version (meaning that only some Mini Nimbus C has carbon fibre wings, the "C" is often thought to represent "Carbon" which is not correct).

The Nimbus 2C and the Mini Nimbus C were the first two carbon-fibre aircraft to be built by Schempp-Hirth. The use of carbon-fibre significantly lightened the Mini Nimbus improving its climbing performance and increasing water ballast capacity while making assembly and disassembly much easier.

=== Performance ===
The Mini-Nimbus glide ratio was somewhat less competitive than its primary rival in sailplane race competitions, the Alexander Schleicher ASW 20. However its superior climbing performance (altitude gained over time while climbing in lifting air) over its rivals made it the choice of some successful international soaring competition pilots in the late 1970s.

One capability of the Mini Nimbus is its powerful trailing-edge integrated air brake/flap system with a 70 kn terminal dive velocity which gives the aircraft strong short field and steep landing approach capabilities.

=== Production ===
159 Mini-Nimbuses were built, many of which remain in use today.

=== Competition use ===
George Moffat won the 1977 European Gliding Championships flying a Mini Nimbus and flew a Mini Nimbus C in the US 15-Meter Gliding Championships. While no longer considered competitive in the 15-meter class, the Mini Nimbus still competes in the Sports Class of sailplane racing where handicaps are allowed in scoring.

== Specifications (Mini-Nimbus C) ==
Data from Jane's all the World's Aircraft 1981-82.

General characteristics

- Crew: 1
- Capacity: 190 kg (420 lb) water ballast
- Length: 6.41 m (21 ft 0 in)
- Wingspan: 15 m (49 ft 3 in)
- Height: 1.32 m (4 ft 4 in)
- Wing area: 9.86 m^{2} (106.1 sq ft)
- Aspect ratio: 22.8
- Empty weight: 235 kg (518 lb)

215 kg (474 lb) with Carbon-fibre wings and tail unit

- Max takeoff weight: 500 kg (1,102 lb)

Performance

- Stall speed: 80 km/h (50 mph, 43 kn)
- Never exceed speed: 250 km/h (160 mph, 130 kn)
- Max aerotow speed: 180 km/h (110 mph; 97 kn)
- Max winch launch speed: 150 km/h (93 mph; 81 kn)
- Maximum glide ratio: 42 at 120 km/h (75 mph; 65 kn)
- Rate of sink: 0.7 m/s (140 ft/min) at 85 km/h (53 mph; 46 kn)
- Wing loading: 51 kg/m^{2} (10 lb/sq ft)

== See also ==
Related development

- Schempp-Hirth Standard Cirrus
- Schempp-Hirth Ventus

Aircraft of comparable role, configuration, and era

- Eiri-Avion PIK-20
- Glaser-Dirks DG-200
- Glasflügel Mosquito
- Rolladen-Schneider LS3
- Schleicher ASW 20
- Slingsby Vega

Related lists

- List of gliders
