= Marfa Film Festival =

Annual film festival held in Marfa, Texas, United States

The Marfa Film Festival is a film festival occurring annually in Marfa, Texas. The Marfa Film Festival was co-founded by Robin Lambaria and filmmaker Cory Van Dyke in 2008. The program featured works from promising newcomers and established filmmakers, as well as beloved or forgotten classics, including outdoor evening screenings in the arid landscape surrounding Marfa. The festival did not designate winners but celebrated innovation and excellence in film through passionate curation and fostering a relaxed social space where up-and-coming filmmakers mix with adventurous cinephiles, industry veterans, and living legends in a captivatingly scenic, culturally rich environment. Movies are shown one at a time to allow the possibility of viewing every film in the program without scheduling conflicts. Musical performances by popular acts, art installations, lounge spaces, and other special events are also a customary part of the five day event.

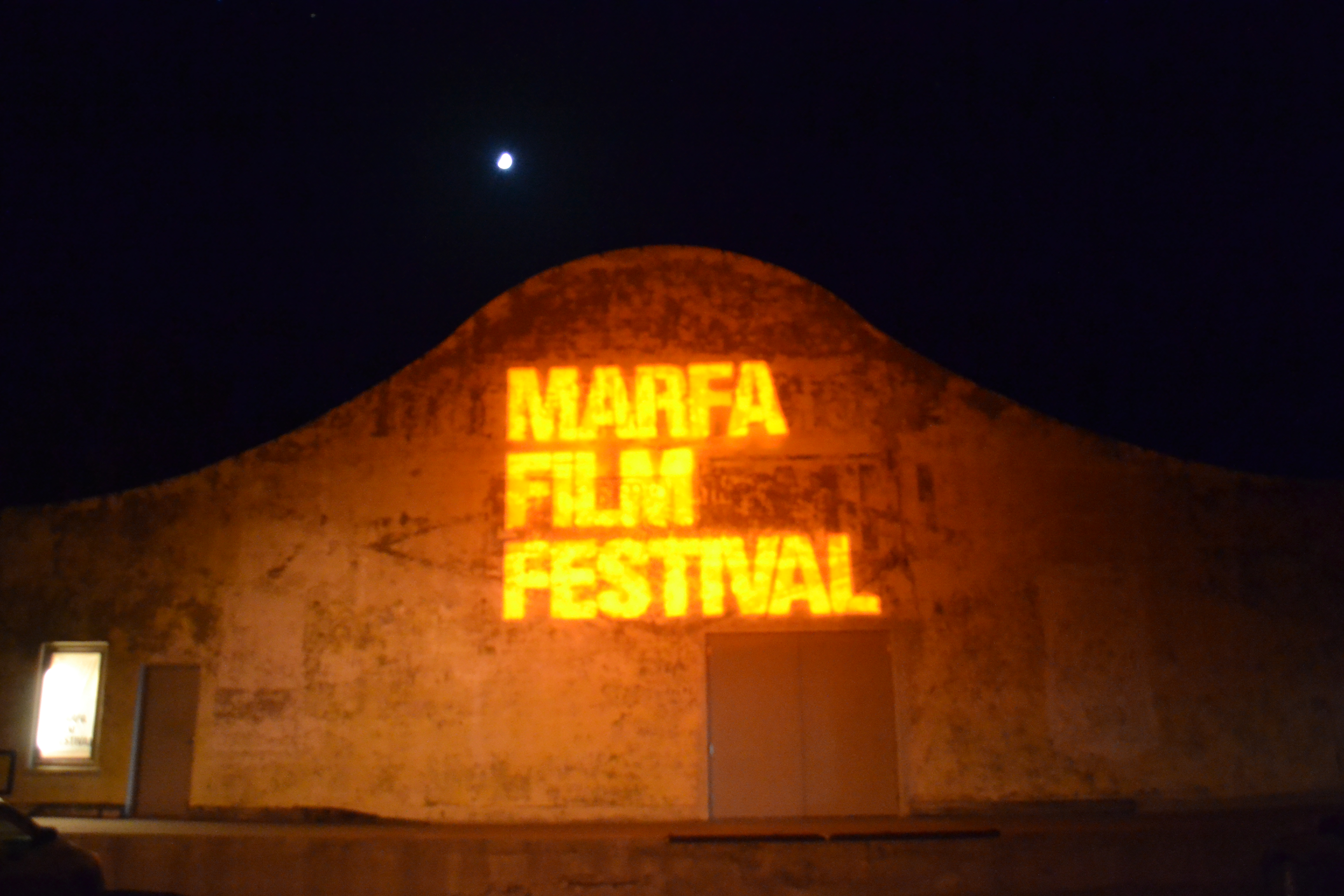
Marfa Film Festival theater venue

Celebrated festival alumni include PT Anderson, Dennis Hopper, Larry McMurtry, Lou Reed, Wim Wenders, Barry Jenkins, Joey Soloway, Wendell B. Harris Jr., Omar Rodríguez-López, David Lowery, David Byrne, David Lynch, Terence Nance, Luke Davies, Andrew Garfield, America Ferrera, Richard Linklater, Cocorosie, Edward Sharpe and the Magnetic Zeros and Heath Ledger.

== History ==
The 2008 festival received accolades for an opening night screening on the "Little Boston" set of There Will Be Blood, was filmed near Marfa. 400 attendees including crew members and extras who had never seen the film were shuttled to the set location 20 miles outside of Marfa. Other movies shown that year included Night of the Hunter, True Stories, The Innocents, Man On Wire, and two music videos directed by Heath Ledger. Edward Sharpe and the Magnetic Zeroes played their first-ever show at the 2008 festival, with an opening performance by artist Mia Doi Todd and Antony Langdon's band Victoria. John Paul and Eloise Dejoria, owners of Patrón and Paul Mitchell, financed the first festival. It was named one of the Top 10 Film Festivals "Worth The Entry Fee" and "The Top Destination Film Festivals In The World" on a list that also included Cannes, Venice Film Festival and Telluride by Wired magazine.

Novelist and author Larry McMurtry made a rare appearance to accept the first "Texas Screen Legend Award" presented by Marfa Film Festival in association with the Texas Association of Film Commissions at the 2009 Marfa Film Festival. Polly Platt and Dianna Ossana were also in attendance during an outdoor screening of The Last Picture Show.

Rock musician Lou Reed attended to premiere his documentary Red Shirley at the 2010 festival. Omar Rodríguez-López's attended to show his feature film The Sentimental Engine Slayer. Other films screened include The Athlete or Atletu, directed by Davey Frankel and Rasselas Lakew, the 1972 classic The Harder They Come by Perry Henzell, and The Sun Ship Game, a 1971 documentary about competition soaring shot primarily in Marfa by Robert Drew, an American documentary filmmaker known as the father of cinema vérité, or direct cinema. Poet and Academy Award-nominated writer Luke Davies premiered his first directorial debut – a short film (produced by Lambaria) AIR featuring the British actor Andrew Garfield in his US debut. America Ferrera and collaborator husband writer-director Ryan Piers Williams premiered The Dry Land produced by Academy nominated producer Heather Rae.

In 2011, there was a two year lull due to a legal dispute between founders Lambaria and Van Dyke.

In 2013, Lambaria brought back the festival and celebrated its return with actor Elijah Wood. That year the festival celebrated with an Indian Holi party and the rarely screened "A Face in the Crowd" by Elia Kazan on 35mm. The festival opened with an outdoor screening of Texas Filmmakers (David Lowery) [Ain't Them Body Saints 9film)\Aint Them Body Saints).

2014 festival highlights included a live score performance by CocoRosie to Sergei Peranajov's 1969 masterpiece The Color of Pomegranates, advance screenings of Richard Linklater's Boyhood and Michel Gondry's Mood Indigo, and an interactive experimental arcade designed especially for MFF around the "Space Cowboy" mythos.

== Other highlights ==
The 2015 Marfa Film Festival celebrated and honored Native Americans and First People in support of the Standing Rock protests. Teepees were erected behind the theater and chiefs gathered to share and connect with festival attendees. The festival hosted a rare 35mm outdoor screening of the rarely seen Japanese animation Belladonna of Sadness at Liz Lambert's famous "El Cosmico" campground/air steam hotel. Many festival attendees watched the film from wood fire hot tubs.

In 2016, Joey Soloway's much anticipated Amazon series I Love Dick which was shot in Marfa. The series stars Kevin Bacon and Kathryn Hahn with a small role for festival creator Robin Lambaria (who is featured in her iconic red jumpsuit in the first scene).

In 2017, the festival honored filmmaker Kevin Cacy, Lambaria long time friend and collaborator who had been involved with the festival since its inception. The Filmmaker's Dinner, an annual beloved event by the filmmakers featuring international chefs featured all of Kevin (who was 1st generation Korean American), favorite dishes, with recipes by his mother who is a celebrated chef. The festival's screenings featured many of Kevin's favorite classic films including a special outdoor 35mm screening the 1990 film Akira Kurosawa's Dreams.

In 2018, the festival celebrated women in film with a program heavily dominated by female filmmakers and artists featuring all female installations by local and international artists. The closing film was a tribute to Maya Deren of whom Lambaria claims to have always drawn inspiration from as an artist.

After a legal action brought by a festival intern, the festival paused in 2019; due to the COVID-19 pandemic it has been on hiatus ever since. During the pandemic Lambaria continued to curate privately for festival fans and friends sent links to hundreds of films during the quarantine.
