= HKS-1 =

German two-seat glider, 1953

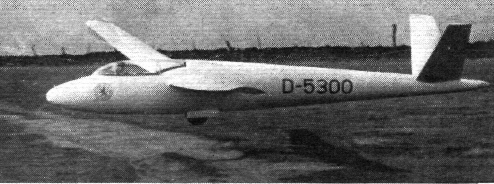

General information
- Type: Two seat experimental sailplane
- National origin: Germany
- Manufacturer: Haase-Kensche-Schmetz
- Designer: Ernst Günter Haase, Heinz Kensche and Fernando Schmetz
- Number built: 2

History
- First flight: July 1953
- Developed into: HKS-3

The HKS-1 was a German 19 19 m (62.3 ft) span high performance two seat sailplane, designed around 1950 to use recent advances in laminar flow airfoils. To avoid premature transition from laminar flow caused by surface interruptions, the HKS-1 dispensed with hinged ailerons, flaps and spoilers and replaced them with a flexible trailing edge. Two were built, setting several records.

== Design and development ==
Any aerodynamic approach that decreased wing drag was welcomed by sailplane designers, who reduced lift-induced drag with high aspect ratio wings. Profile drag was reduced by maintaining laminar flow over as much of the wing as possible. The NACA 6-series profiles of the late 1930s suggested that laminar flow might be maintained as far back as 70% chord, though military experience during World War II showed that much less ambitious targets were hard to achieve with riveted surfaces on wings with gaps for control surfaces, armament, service hatches etc. After the war, sailplane designers realised that their wooden surfaces could, with care, be made smoother over long distances than metal ones, that sailplanes had fewer wing surface interruptions than military machines and their lower speeds meant lower Reynolds numbers, encouraging stronger laminar flow. Such aircraft began to appear from 1950 onwards and showed striking improvements in performance.

The HKS-1 was a tandem two seat sailplane first flown in 1953, designed to be fast but also to fly slowly for soaring in thermals. Its designers chose a 14% maximum thickness-to-chord ratio NACA airfoil, capable of maintaining laminar flow over the front 50% of the wing at lift coefficients between 0.5 and 0.9. They noted that the first of the laminar designs, the Ross-Johnson RJ-5, only achieved its potential after its flaps and spoilers were removed and the underside aileron hinge gaps carefully sealed, so decided to remove all hinged control surfaces and replaced them by wing warping. To do this, the trailing edge had to be flexible and controllable from wing root to tip.

The HKS-1 was a wooden aircraft, largely covered with a plywood/rigid plastic foam/plywood sandwich skin (PFP). The wings had strong spruce and ply double box spars; major ribs were made from PFP and were assisted by intermediate foam ribs. The first two layers of the sandwich skin were added from the leading edge to an auxiliary spar at 70% chord and precisely shaped. The outer plywood sheet of the PFP sandwich was then wrapped continuously around and glued to the inner layers, leaving no gaps. Final external shaping reduced the waviness to 50 μm. Before this outer layer was attached, the area of it corresponding to the last 30% of chord, where it formed the whole skin thickness, was weakened by cuts through its inner plies, making it flexible enough to warp when driven by internal parallelogram frames opened and closed by lateral control rods. The edges could be warped differentially to act as ailerons or together to change camber. Control loads were reported as heavy.

The wing was mid-mounted with some dihedral and also with forward sweep to improve the visibility from the tandem cockpit. The fuselage was PFP skinned over PFP frames, with a shaped balsa outer layer for smoothness. This proved to be too easily damaged and was replaced on the second aircraft with a glass-fibre shell. The HKS-1 had a fully retractable monowheel undercarriage, assisted by partially retractable nose-skid/nose-wheel combination. In the absence of airbrakes it used a tail ribbon parachute. It had a 100° V-tail of similar construction to the wings.

The HKS-1 made its first flight at Düsseldorf in July 1953. Early tests showed that it was tail heavy, so 10 kg (22 lb) of water ballast was added in the nose. Speeds were high and the glide ratio 38:1. With two pilots aboard, the wing loading of 35 kg/m^{2} (7.2 lb/sq ft) was high for the time and limited the minimum turn radius, so other slower gliders could better exploit narrow thermals. It was this observation which led to the development of the HKS-3, a smaller single seat sailplane with a lower wing loading and other changes but similar in design to the HSK-1.

In 1955 a second example, the HKS-1 V2 flew. This was identical to the HKS-1 apart from a 3° decrease in forward sweep, made to compensate for the tail heaviness, and replacement of the vulnerable balsa fuselage sheath with fibre-glass. This second machine is called the HKS-2 by some authors, whereas others associate this name with a development abandoned during its design stage.

== Operational history ==
The HKS-1 set several records, breaking the German speed around a 100 km (62 mi) triangle twice. Ernst Günter Haase flew it at the weather affected 1954 World Gliding Championships, held at Camphill in Derbyshire. The organisers had not allowed for the greater weight of some of the newer aircraft, including the HKS-1, and launches were only made successfully after the hasty acquisition of more powerful German winches. Haase eventually finished about halfway up the final list. Rolf Kunz flew the HKS-1 at the next World Championships, held in Poland in 1958. After a flight of about 500 km (311 mi), the HKS-1 was totally destroyed in a road accident during retrieval.

The HKS-1 V2 remains at the Deutsches Segelflugmuseum mit Modellflug on the Wasserkuppe and may be viewed with prior permission.

== Variants ==
HSK-1 V1
Original aircraft.
HKS-1 V2
As HKS-1 V1 except for a 3° reduction in forward sweep and GRP fuselage outer skin.

== Specifications (HKS-1 V1) ==
Data from Sailplanes 1945-1965

General characteristics

- Crew: 2
- Length: 8.25 m (27 ft 1 in)
- Wingspan: 19.0 m (62 ft 4 in)
- Wing area: 17.79 m^{2} (191.5 sq ft)
- Aspect ratio: 20.3
- Airfoil: NACA 65_{215}-714
- Empty weight: 440 kg (970 lb) equipped
- Max takeoff weight: 620 kg (1,367 lb)

Performance

- Stall speed: 65 km/h (40 mph, 35 kn) - 2-seat, 60 km/h (37.3 mph; 32.4 kn) - solo
- Never exceed speed: 230 km/h (140 mph, 120 kn)
- Rough air speed max: 150 km/h (93.2 mph; 81.0 kn)
- Aerotow speed: 150 km/h (93.2 mph; 81.0 kn)
- Winch launch max speed: 80 km/h (49.7 mph; 43.2 kn)
- Terminal velocity: with full airbrakes 230 km/h (143 mph; 124 kn)
- Minimum control speed: 70 km/h (43 mph, 38 kn)
- g limits: 2-seat - +4.2 -2.2 at 261 km/h (162 mph; 141 kn), solo - +5.2 -3.2 at 261 km/h (162 mph; 141 kn)
- Maximum glide ratio: 37.2:1 at 89 km/h (55.3 mph; 48.1 kn) - 2-seat, 37.2:1 at 80 km/h (49.7 mph; 43.2 kn) - solo
- Rate of sink: 0.61 m/s (120 ft/min) at 77 km/h (47.8 mph; 41.6 kn) - 2-seat, 0.56 m/s (110.2 ft/min) at 72 km/h (44.7 mph; 38.9 kn) - solo
- Wing loading: 29 kg/m^{2} (5.9 lb/sq ft) flown solo 35 kg/m^{2} (7.168 lb/sq ft)

== See also ==
Related development HKS-3 Aircraft of comparable role, configuration, and era

- Schempp-Hirth SHK
- Standard Austria

Related lists

- List of gliders
