= Schempp-Hirth Duo Discus =

German two-seat glider, 1993

Duo Discus
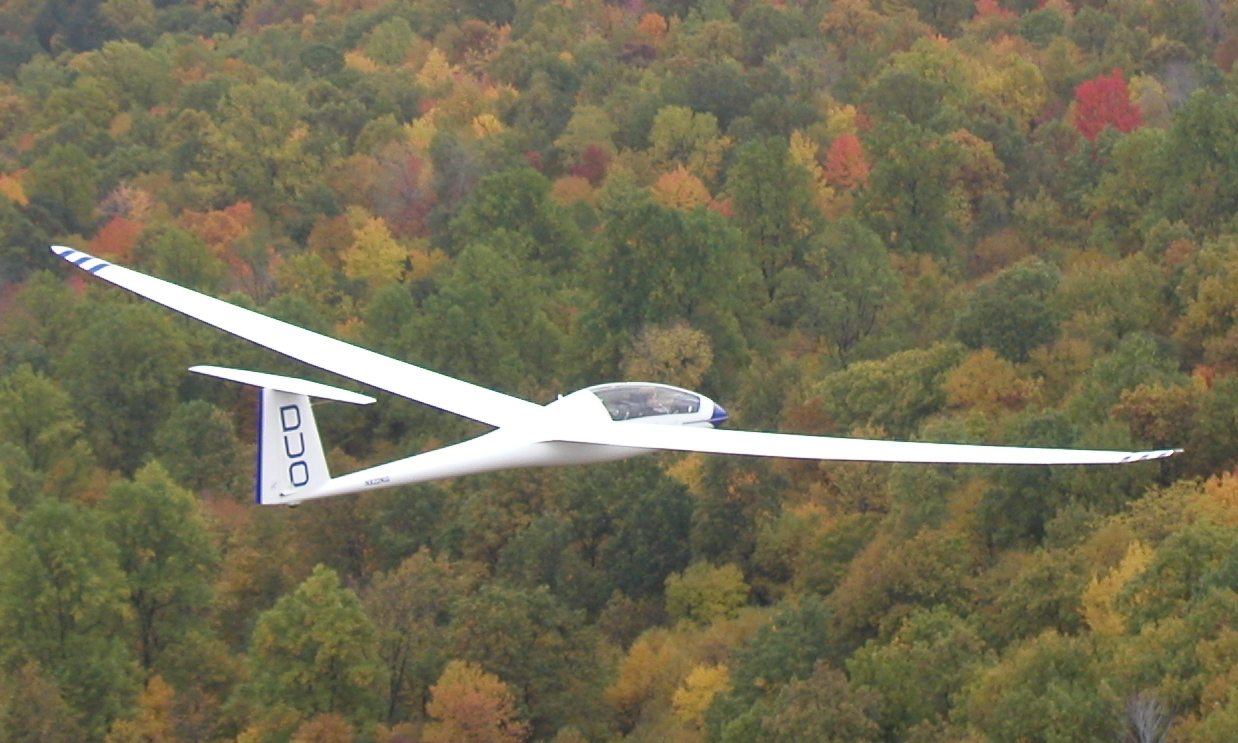
- Duo Discus T flying over the ridges of Pennsylvania, US

General information
- Type: Two Seater-class sailplane
- National origin: Germany
- Manufacturer: Schempp-Hirth
- Number built: 750 as of Sept 2023

History
- First flight: 1993

The Schempp-Hirth Duo Discus is a high-performance two-seat glider primarily designed for fast cross-country flying, including gliding competitions. Often, it is used for advanced training.

== Design and development ==
The Duo Discus replaced the Janus as Schempp Hirth's high-performance two-seater trainer. It has a four-piece wing with a span of 20 metres. As with most tandem two-seat gliders, its wing is slightly swept forward so the wing root can be slightly aft to allow the rear pilot an improved view. Although it shares its name with the highly successful Standard Class Discus, any resemblance is only superficial. It first flew in 1993 and is still in production at the factory in Orlican in the Czech Republic. Its best glide ratio was measured as 44:1. An optional 'turbo' retractable two-stroke engine can be specified for extended gliding sessions. As of August 2007, over 500 Duo Discuses have been built. In the U.S. Air Force, it is known as the TG-15A. The chief rival of the Duo Discus is now the DG Flugzeugbau DG-1001.

=== Duo Discus X ===
A revised model, the Duo Discus X, was announced in 2005. This has landing flaps incorporated into the movement of the airbrake lever to improve its approach control, giving steeper and slower approaches. It also has winglets to improve thermal flying, and a sprung and lower retractable undercarriage.

=== Duo Discus XL ===
The Duo Discus XL is the latest version. It shares the same fuselage as the Schempp-Hirth Arcus and the Schempp-Hirth Nimbus 4DL. The cockpit is now 10 cm longer to improve seat comfort, security, space, and ergonomics. The airbrake system has been moved 4 cm towards the leading edge, and now extends 18 mm higher. The XL is certified for simple aerobatics, including spinning. It can also be flown entirely from the back seat.

=== Duo Discus XLT ===
The Duo Discus XLT is a motorized version of the Duo Discus XL.

== Specifications (XL) ==
General characteristics

- Crew: Two
- Capacity: 200 kg (440 lb) water ballast
- Length: 8.73 m (28 ft 3 in)
- Wingspan: 20.00 m (65 ft 7 in)
- Height: 1.60 m (5 ft 3 in)
- Wing area: 16.4 m^{2} (176 sq ft)
- Aspect ratio: 24.4
- Airfoil: DFVLR HX 83
- Empty weight: 410 kg (900 lb)
- Gross weight: 700 kg (1,540 lb)

Performance

- Maximum speed: 263 km/h (164 mph, 143 kn)
- Maximum glide ratio: 46-47
- Rate of sink: 0.58 m/s (114 ft/min)

== See also ==
Aircraft of comparable role, configuration, and era

- Glaser-Dirks DG-505
- DG Flugzeugbau DG-1000

Related lists

- List of gliders
