= Vogt Lo-170 =

German single-seat glider, 1968

Lo-170

General information
- Type: Glider
- National origin: West Germany
- Designer: Alfred Vogt
- Number built: 1

History
- First flight: 20 November 1968

The Vogt Lo-170 is a West German high-wing, FAI Open Class single seat glider that was designed by Alfred Vogt.

== Design and development ==
The development of the Lo-170 was started in 1960. It was intended as a modern 17 m (55.8 ft) wingspan cross country sailplane for production by Schempp-Hirth.

The forward fuselage was built from welded steel tube, surrounded by a fibreglass skin. The wing was built from plywood in a negative mold and then covered with fibreglass. The wing uses a Wortmann FX 61-184 airfoil.

Schempp-Hirth decided to produce the Schempp-Hirth Standard Austria and its FAI Open Class variant Schempp-Hirth SHK instead and as a result only one Lo-170 was produced.

== Operational history ==
The aircraft was converted to a motor glider in 1972, with two wing-mounted engines. Plans included increasing the span to 20 m (65.6 ft).

== Specifications (Lo-170) ==
Data from Sailplane Directory and Soaring

General characteristics

- Crew: one
- Wingspan: 17.0 m (55 ft 9 in)
- Wing area: 13.15 m^{2} (141.5 sq ft)
- Aspect ratio: 21.98:1
- Airfoil: FX 61-184
- Empty weight: 148 kg (326 lb)
- Gross weight: 200 kg (440 lb)

Performance

- Maximum glide ratio: 36 at 92 km/h (57 mph)
- Rate of sink: 0.58 m/s (114 ft/min) at 70 km/h (43 mph)
- Wing loading: 33.5 kg/m^{2} (6.9 lb/sq ft)

== See also ==
Related lists

- List of gliders
