= Schempp-Hirth Nimbus-3 =

Nimbus-3D
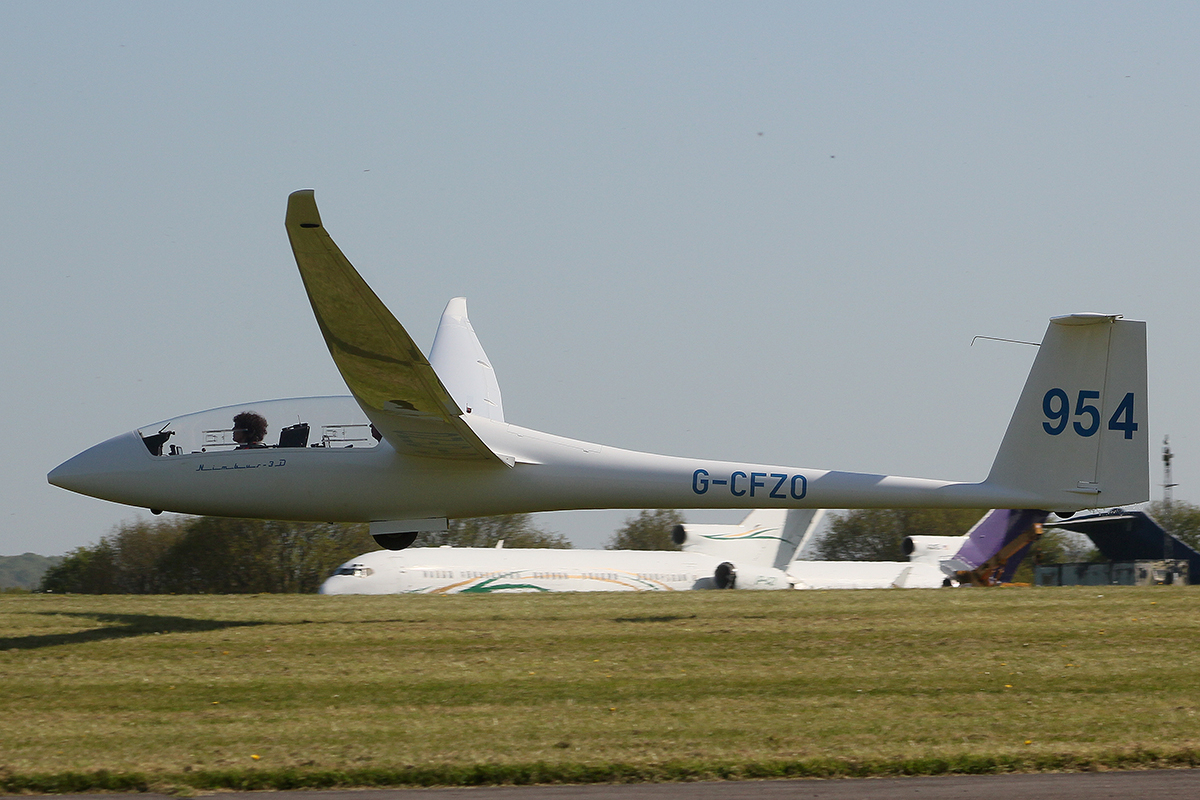

General information
- Type: Open-class sailplane
- National origin: Germany
- Manufacturer: Schempp-Hirth
- Designer: Klaus Holighaus

History
- First flight: 21 February 1981

The Schempp-Hirth Nimbus 3 is a glider built by Schempp-Hirth.

== Design and development ==
The Nimbus-3 uses carbon-fibre extensively and has a new wing profile compared with the Nimbus-2. It has a four-piece carbon-fibre wing with a 22.9 metre span but may be increased to 24.5 or 25.5 metres with tip extensions. The outer wing panels are slightly modified Ventus wings. When rolling at large aileron deflection, small spoiler flaps deploy at the inner wingtip to compensate for lack of rudder power. It was first flown on 21 February 1981 by its designer Dipl.-Ing Klaus Holighaus. A glide ratio of 60:1 has been claimed. The Nimbus-3T version has a sustainer engine.

Nimbus-3s took the first three places in the Open Class in the 1981 World Gliding Championships although there were only 12 entrants. In the 1983 World Championships it took the top six places, and it won again in the 1985 Championships.

The D-model (Nimbus-3D) is the two-seater version. There is also a self-launched two-seat version (Nimbus-3DM) and a two-seat sustainer version (Nimbus-3DT). The first flight of the D-model was in May 1986.

The Nimbus-3 was succeeded by the Schempp-Hirth Nimbus-4.

== Specifications (Nimbus 3) ==
Data from Jane's All the World's Aircraft 1988-89

General characteristics

- Crew: 1
- Length: 7.63 m (25 ft 0 in)
- Wingspan: 22.9 m (75 ft 2 in)
- Height: 1.55 m (5 ft 1 in)
- Wing area: 16.3 m^{2} (175 sq ft)
- Aspect ratio: 32.2
- Empty weight: 392 kg (864 lb)
- Max takeoff weight: 750 kg (1,653 lb)
- Water ballast: 280 L (74 US gal; 62 imp gal)

Performance

- Stall speed: 60 km/h (37 mph, 32 kn)
- Never exceed speed: 270 km/h (170 mph, 150 kn) in smooth air

200 km/h (110 kn; 120 mph) in rough air
180 km/h (97 kn; 110 mph) on aero-tow
150 km/h (81 kn; 93 mph) on winch launch

- g limits: +5.3 -2.65
- Maximum glide ratio: 55:1 at 95 km/h (51 kn; 59 mph)
- Rate of sink: 0.44 m/s (87 ft/min) at 75 km/h (40 kn; 47 mph)
- Wing loading: 46 kg/m^{2} (9.4 lb/sq ft)

== See also ==
Aircraft of comparable role, configuration, and era

- Schleicher ASW 22

Related lists

- List of gliders
