= George B. Moffat Jr. =

American author and pilot

George Moffat Jr.
- Born: 1927
- Died: June 20, 2024 (aged 97); Marion, Massachusetts, U.S.
- Known for: Two time "Open Class" World Gliding Champion
- Scientific career
- Fields: Soaring and Teaching

George B. Moffat Jr. (1927 – June 20, 2024) was an American author, twice world champion glider pilot, and a member of the U.S. Soaring Hall of Fame. He began flying airplanes in 1953, gliders in 1959, entered his first national soaring competition in 1962, and was still an active competition pilot as of 2008. Before competing in sailplanes, he compiled a winning record in International 14 foot Dinghy racing.

Moffat was the first pilot ever to win the Open Class title twice in the World Gliding Championships, won five U.S. National championships, and was one of only two pilots to have won the U.S. national title in all three glider competition classes (Open, Standard and 15-meter). A holder of the Lilienthal Gliding Medal, the highest award in gliding, he flew competitively in over eight countries.

== Biography ==
Moffat was one of America's foremost competition pilots and had been soaring since 1958. Aside from winning several Nationals dating from 1969, and setting three triangle speed records, he won the world title in 1970 and 1974.

After only a few days to become acquainted with the prototype Schempp-Hirth Nimbus he flew it in the 1970 World Gliding Championships at Marfa, Texas. He had to modify the aircraft's cockpit to fit in, and became the first person to sample its spin characteristics when, in mid-competition, the glider departed from a steep turn into autorotation. While considering bailing out, he remembered that the spin of the similar Akaflieg Darmstadt D36 could be tamed by rocking the stick back and forth violently. Flexing the wings caused the angle of attack to change and recovery eventually ensued. In spite of these difficulties, Moffat and the Nimbus won the World Championship.

In 1974, he wrote "Winning on the Wind". He placed first in the 1975 Smirnoff Transcontinental Sailplane Race, and won the Coupe d'Europe European Sailplane Championship in 1977 at Angers, France.

He was an enthusiastic sailor, winning the Eastern High Point Trophy three times, and the Douglass Trophy for match racing against Canada. He has written about 85 articles on soaring and sailing in publications such as Yachting, Soaring, Sailplane & Gliding, and Popular Science. He held an MA from the University of Pennsylvania awarded in 1955, taught at Rutgers Preparatory School (Somerset, New Jersey), Rutgers University (New Brunswick, New Jersey), and was head of the English department at Pingry School (at two New Jersey campuses).

Moffat's victory in the 1969 US National Soaring Championship is chronicled in the 1971 film The Sun Ship Game by cinéma vérité filmmaker Robert Drew and his 1974 victory at the World Gliding Championships at Waikerie in South Australia was captured in the film of the championships Zulu Romeo – Good Start.

George Moffat lived in Marion, Massachusetts, and died there at the age of 97 on June 20, 2024.

== World glider records ==
- Single-place glider
  - Speed over a triangular course of 100 km: 128.38 km/h, August 16, 1962, El Mirage Dry Lake, Schreder HP-8
  - Speed over a triangular course of 300 km: 108.12 km/h, August 19, 1962, El Mirage Dry Lake, Schreder HP-8
  - Speed over a triangular course of 300 km: 119.87 km/h, August 6, 1964, Odessa, Texas, Schreder HP-8

Source: Fédération Aéronautique Internationale

== Championships ==
=== World championships ===
- 1970 Marfa, Texas, Open Class, Schempp-Hirth Nimbus
- 1974 Waikerie, South Australia, Open Class, Schempp-Hirth Nimbus-2

=== International championships ===
- 1975 Smirnoff Transcontinental Derby, Eiri-Avion PIK-20
- 1977 European Championships, 15 meter class, Schempp-Hirth Mini-Nimbus

== Other flying accomplishments ==
- Lilienthal Gliding Medal, 1977
- FAI Challenge Cup 1970, 1974
- Exceptional Service Award 1999
- Exceptional Achievement Award 1966, 1970, 1973
- Barnaby Lecture 2001
- du Pont Trophy 1969, 1973, 1982
- Stroukoff Trophy 1966, 1982
- Standard Class Trophy 1970
- Schreder 15-Meter Trophy 1978
- FAI Diamond #44 (Int #449) 1965

Source: Soaring Hall of Fame

== Books authored ==
- 1975, Winning on the Wind, The Soaring Press, Los Altos, California. Library of Congress Catalog Card No. 74-82783
- 2005, Winning II: new perspectives, Julian, Pennsylvania: Knauff & Grove. ISBN 0-9704254-4-9
