= The Sun Ship Game =

The Sun Ship Game is a 1971 documentary film about competition soaring in the United States. Shot in Cinéma vérité style by filmmaker Robert Drew, the film follows the adventures of George Moffat and Gleb Derujinsky as they vie for the title of US National Champion soaring pilot in 1969. While the film focuses primarily on the friendly rivalry between Moffat and Derujinsky, Moffat's truer nemesis in the film is Wally Scott, flying his Schleicher ASW 12.

In the film, Moffat and Derujinsky both fly Schempp-Hirth Cirrus sailplanes.
