= Schempp-Hirth Ventus =

1980 German single-seat glider

Ventus
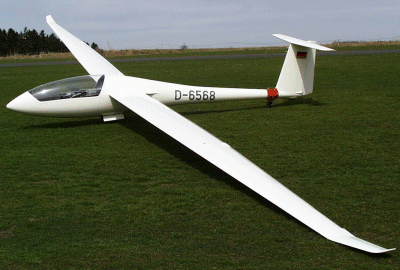

General information
- Type: 15 metre-class sailplane
- National origin: Germany
- Manufacturer: Schempp-Hirth
- Designer: Klaus Holighaus
- Number built: ca. 611

History
- First flight: 1980
- Variant: Schempp-Hirth Ventus 2

The Schempp-Hirth Ventus is a sailplane produced during 1980–1994 by Schempp-Hirth, a German sailplane manufacturer. It was designed by Klaus Holighaus and replaced the Schempp-Hirth Mini-Nimbus. Schempp-Hirth manufactured 613 Ventus sailplanes.

== Design and development ==
The decline in the cost of carbon fibre during the 1970s allowed sailplane designers to design large components from carbon-fibre reinforced plastic (CFRP). The use of carbon-fibre lay-ups, designed to reduce aero-elasticity of wings, has allowed CFRP gliders to be designed to cruise at much higher speeds than those with wings made from fibreglass (GFRP) or wood, as well as take advantage of thinner aerofoil sections. The Ventus has a 15-metre wingspan, using CFRP in its structure, complying with 15 m Racing Class specifications. Extended wingtips can be fitted to increase the span to 16.6 metres for competition in the Open Class. The fuselage was also produced in two sizes to suit pilots of different heights – the Ventus A for short pilots and Ventus B with a longer and wider cockpit. Both Ventus A and Ventus B have a complex flap/brake arrangement similar to that of the Glasflügel Mosquito and the Mini-Nimbus, but the Ventus C reverted to conventional upper-surface air-brakes that are separate from the trailing-edge flaps.

Wingtip extensions could be fitted to the Ventus A and B to increase the wingspan to 16.6 m. Longer extensions could be fitted to the Ventus C to increase the span to 17.6 m. Modified extensions with winglets are also available. Some Ventus Bs and Cs are equipped with a small sustaining engine ("turbo") and are designated with a T while some are equipped with a more powerful engine and are self-launching and are designated with an M.

The best measured glide ratio of a Ventus at 15 metres wingspan is 44:1, improving to 46:1 with the 16.6 metre tips, giving a creditable performance for the 1980s and 1990s. Ventus sailplanes won two World Gliding Championships, competing against the ASW 20 and later the LS6 in the 15 m class. Whilst the Ventus A and B acquired reputations for unparalleled high-speed glide performance, the Ventus C introduced improvements in handling.

About 613 Ventus sailplanes were built before being replaced by the Schempp-Hirth Ventus 2 in 1995.

The Ventus 1 remains a competitive glider winning national level competitions. The Ventus 1A is still being flown at the World Championship level in 2017.

== Variants ==
data from:Schempp-Hirth Flugzeugbau GmbH website

Ventus A (15m / 16.6m)
The production standard 15m class Ventus with shorter and narrower cockpit.
Ventus B (15m / 16.6m)
Production aircraft with larger cockpit for larger pilot.
Ventus BT (15m / 16.6m)
The Ventus B with a retractable sustainer motor.
Ventus C (15m / 17.6m)
Later model with improved handling and air brakes separate from the trailing-edge flaps.
Ventus CT (15m / 17.6m)
The Ventus C with a retractable sustainer motor.
Ventus CM (15m / 17.6m)
The Ventus C with a retractable motor for self-launching.

== Specifications (Ventus C) ==
Data from Jane's All the World's Aircraft 1988–89

General characteristics

- Crew: 1
- Length: 6.58 m (21 ft 7 in)
- Wingspan: 17.6 m (57 ft 9 in) with extensions
- Wing area: 10.15 m^{2} (109.3 sq ft) with extensions
- Aspect ratio: 30.2 with extensions
- Airfoil: Wortmann/Holighaus/Althaus section
- Empty weight: 243 kg (536 lb)
- Max takeoff weight: 430 kg (948 lb)
- Water ballast: 160 L (42 US gal; 35 imp gal)

Performance

- Stall speed: 58 km/h (36 mph, 31 kn)
- Never exceed speed: 270 km/h (170 mph, 150 kn) in smooth air

200 km/h (110 kn; 120 mph) in rough air
180 km/h (97 kn; 110 mph) on aero-tow
150 km/h (81 kn; 93 mph) on winch launch

- g limits: +5.3 -2.65
- Maximum glide ratio: 49 at 100 km/h (54 kn; 62 mph) fuselage version "a"
- Rate of sink: 0.54 m/s (106 ft/min) at 75 km/h (40 kn; 47 mph)
- Wing loading: 33 kg/m^{2} (6.8 lb/sq ft)

== See also ==
Related lists

- List of gliders
