= Rotax 535 =

Austrian two-stroke aircraft engine

- Type: Aircraft engine
- National origin: Austria
- Manufacturer: Rotax
- First run: circa 1982
- Major applications: Glaser-Dirks DG-500M; Schempp-Hirth Janus; Schempp-Hirth Nimbus-4

The Rotax 535 is an Austrian aircraft engine, that was designed and produced by Rotax of Gunskirchen for use in motor gliders.

The first application for type certification to JAR 22, Appendix H, was made on 29 June 1982 and the first certification was granted on 27 April 1983. It is out of production and is no longer offered for sale by Rotax.

== Design and development ==
The Rotax 535 is a twin cylinder two-stroke, in-line, 521.2 cc (31.8 cu in) displacement, liquid-cooled, gasoline engine design, with a 3:1 belt reduction drive. It employs dual Bosch or Ducati magnetic high-voltage condenser ignition systems, one or two carburetors and produces a maximum of 60 hp (45 kW) at 7200 rpm. It runs on 96 octane automotive gasoline or 100LL avgas. Lubrication is 50:1 super two stroke oil premixed with the fuel.

== Variants ==
535A
Equipped with twin Tillotson HR or Mikuni BN 38 diaphragm carburetors and a Mikuni DF 44 diaphragm fuel pump. Produces 60 hp (45 kW) at 7200 rpm. First certified on 27 April 1983.
535B
Equipped with twin Tillotson HR or Mikuni BN 38 diaphragm carburetors and a Mikuni DF 44 diaphragm fuel pump. Produces 55 hp (41 kW) at 7200 rpm. First certified on 27 April 1983.
535C
Equipped with one Mikuni BN 38 diaphragm carburetor and a Mikuni DF 44 diaphragm fuel pump. Produces 60 hp (45 kW) at 7200 rpm. First certified on 12 June 1987.

== Applications ==
- Glaser-Dirks DG-500M
- Rolladen-Schneider LS9 - prototype
- Schempp-Hirth Janus
- Schempp-Hirth Nimbus-4
- Schleicher ASH 25

== Specifications (535A) ==
Data from EASA Type Certificate

=== General characteristics ===
- Type: Twin cylinder, two stroke aircraft engine
- Bore: 72 mm (2.8 in)
- Stroke: 64 mm (2.5 in)
- Displacement: 521.2 cc (31.8 cu in)

=== Components ===
- Fuel system: 2 x Tillotson HR or Mikuni BN 38 diaphragm carburetors, with a Mikuni DF 44 diaphragm fuel pump
- Fuel type: 96 octane automotive gasoline or 100LL avgas
- Oil system: 50:1 super two stroke oil premixed with fuel
- Cooling system: liquid
- Reduction gear: 3:1 belt reduction drive

=== Performance ===
- Power output: 60 hp (45 kW)
- Fuel consumption: 100% power approximately 29 L/h (7.67 gal/h), 75% power approximately 22 L/h (5.82 gal/h)

== See also ==
Related lists

- List of aircraft engines
