= Schempp-Hirth Nimbus-4 =

German single- or two-seat glider, 1990

Nimbus 4
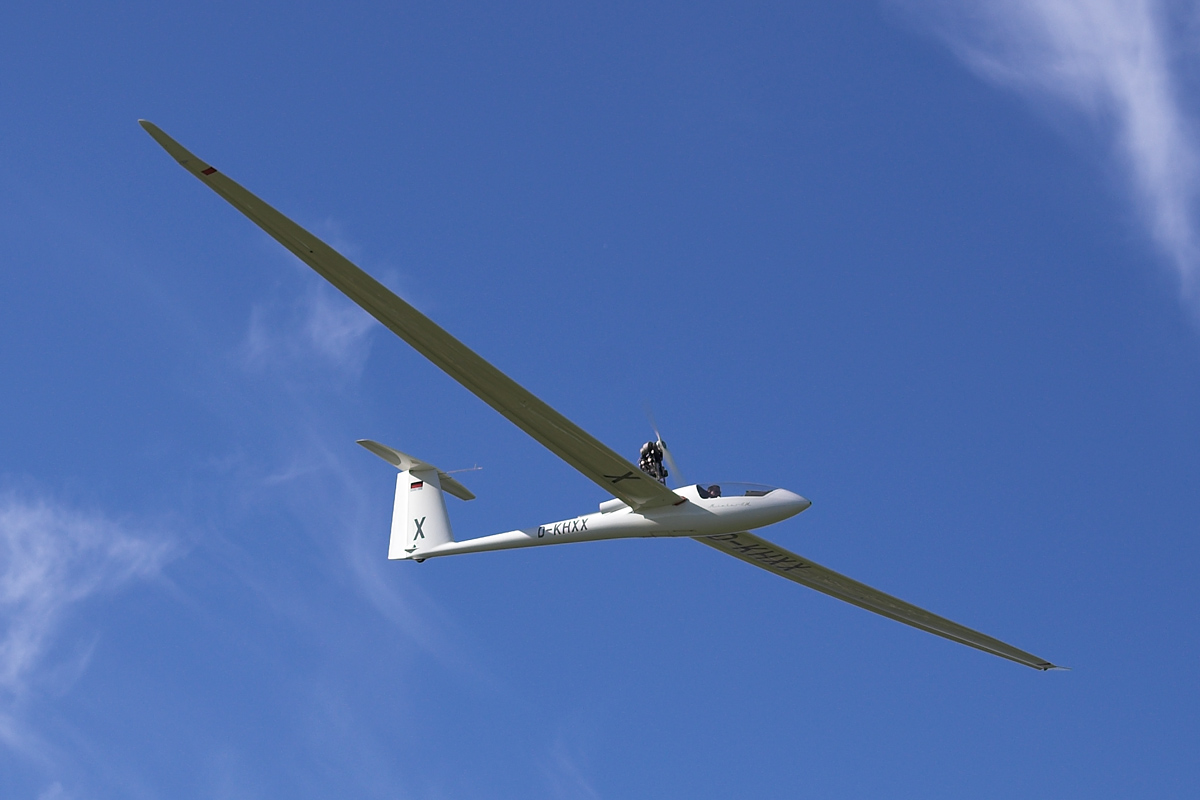
- Nimbus 4M with powerplant deployed

General information
- Type: high-performance FAI Open Class glider
- Manufacturer: Schempp-Hirth Flugzeugbau GmbH
- Designer: Klaus Holighaus
- Number built: 144 (as of 2011)

History
- First flight: 1990
- Developed from: Schempp-Hirth Nimbus-3

The Schempp-Hirth Nimbus-4 is a family of high-performance FAI Open Class gliders designed by Klaus Holighaus and manufactured by Schempp-Hirth Flugzeugbau GmbH in Kirchheim, Germany. The Nimbus-4 first flew in 1990.

== Design and development ==
The Nimbus-4 family is a direct derivative of its predecessors at the highest performance end of the Schempp-Hirth product range, the Nimbus-2 and Nimbus-3. In total as of 2010, 44 single-seat and 100 two-seat models have been produced. The wing taper varies along the span, which is increased to 26.5 metres. The aspect ratio is 38.8. The fuselage is also lengthened and a larger rudder fitted.

The manufacturer claims this glider has a glide ratio of better than 60:1 at a best glide airspeed of 110 km/h (59 knots), meaning it can glide over 60 kilometres on course for every 1000 metres of altitude lost in still air.

There is a two-seat version, the 4D, and motor glider versions with either turbo engines (designation T) or self-launching engines (designation M).

== Nimbus-4DM ==
The Nimbus-4DM is typical of the Nimbus-4 design, except for variations in cockpit and powerplant configuration and associated operating limitations. It is a 2-seat, high-performance motorized glider, constructed from fiber reinforced plastic (FRP) composites, featuring full span flight controls and a T-tail (with fixed horizontal stabilizer and two-piece elevator). The manufacturing process uses a hand lay-up of composite material plies and epoxy resins.

The wing's 26.5-meter (87-foot) span consists of three sections per side, consisting of a wing tip, outboard section, and inboard section. The inboard sections mate at the fuselage and the outer wing sections mate with the inboard sections approximately 12.6 feet outboard of the fuselage root chord. The wing shells are a carbon fiber/foam core sandwich construction with one main spar constructed of a glass fiber/foam core shear web and carbon fiber spar flanges. A single-vane flap spans the entire inboard wing section. Three sections of ailerons (that is, inboard, center, and outboard) span the outboard wing section with a fourth aileron, used to minimize the effects of adverse yaw, attached to the wing tip.

The forward fuselage (cockpit) is constructed of Kevlar, carbon and glass fiber laminate, reinforced by a double skin on the sides with integrated surrounding canopy frame and seat pan mounting flanges. The single-piece canopy hinges sideways and opens to the right. The aft fuselage section is constructed of a pure carbon fiber monolithic shell, stiffened by carbon fiber/foam core bulkheads and glass fiber webs.

The horizontal stabilizer is constructed of glass fiber/foam core sandwich with carbon fiber reinforcements. The elevator halves are a hybrid composite (carbon and glass fiber) monolithic shell. The vertical stabilizer is carbon fiber/foam core sandwich construction. The single-piece rudder is constructed of glass fiber/foam core sandwich.

The flight controls are all push/pull tubes except for the rudder, which is controlled via cables.

The Nimbus-4DM is powered by a liquid-cooled 44 kW Bombardier Rotax 535C engine with a 3:1 belt reduction drive. The powerplant is housed in the fuselage immediately aft of the wing. An electrically driven spindle drive (jackscrew) extends the propeller pylon upwards and forward from the engine bay. When stowed, two doors mounted to the rear fuselage conceal the powerplant. The jackscrew is attached between the airframe and the upper forward end of the pylon such that when the jackscrew is retracted (shortened) the pylon is pulled upwards and forward into its flight position.

A 4DM holds the world record for speed over a 500 km course - 306.8 km/h (190.6 mph) which is in excess of its V_{NE}. It was flown by Klaus Ohlmann and Matias Garcia Mazzaro on 22 December 2006.

== Accident history ==
U.S. National Transportation Safety Board (NTSB) investigators queried the German Luftfahrt-Bundesamt (LBA), Germany's equivalent of the U.S. Federal Aviation Administration (FAA), regarding the accident history of the Nimbus-4DM in conjunction with a 1999 accident near Minden, Nevada where both occupants of the aircraft were killed. In this accident, the glider broke up in flight during the recovery phase after a departure from controlled flight while maneuvering in thermal lift conditions. Airborne witnesses in other gliders who saw the beginning of the accident sequence said the glider was in a tight turn, as if climbing in a thermal, when it entered a spiral. With a 45-degree nose-down attitude, the speed quickly built up as the glider completed two full rotations. The rotation then stopped, the flight stabilized on a northeasterly heading, and the nose pitched further down to a near-vertical attitude (this is consistent with the spin recovery technique specified in the Aircraft Flight Manual (AFM)). The glider was observed to level its attitude, with the wings bending upward and the wing tips coning higher, when the outboard wing tip panels separated from the glider, the wings disintegrated, and the fuselage dived into the ground. Several witnesses estimated that the wing deflection reached 45 degrees or more before the wings failed. Examination of the wreckage disclosed that the left and right outboard wing sections failed symmetrically at two locations.

In this case, the NTSB determined "that the probable cause of this accident was the pilot's excessive use of the elevator control during recovery from an inadvertently entered spin and/or spiral dive during which the glider exceeded the maximum permissible speed, which resulted in the overload failure of the wings at loadings beyond the structure's ultimate design loads."

At the time there were three previous accidents worldwide on file with the Federal Bureau of Aircraft Accidents Investigation (BFU), Germany's equivalent of the NTSB. The first was a non-injury long landing accident in Fayence, France, on 4 September 1994. The second involved a collision with the ground during takeoff in Fuentemilanos, Spain, on 27 July 1997, which resulted in two fatalities. The improper installation of the horizontal stabilizer led to the third accident in Lüsse, Germany, on 13 June 1999, in which two occupants were injured during an attempted takeoff when the stabilizer separated from the empennage just after liftoff.

NTSB investigators became aware of another accident involving a Nimbus-4DM that occurred in Spain shortly after the Minden, Nevada, accident. According to the Comisión de Investigación de Accidentes e Incidentes de Aviación Civil, Spain's equivalent of the NTSB, the glider broke up in flight following a high-speed excursion beyond Vne. According to preliminary information supplied by the Spanish authorities, the pilot stated they were in a turn when a heavy thermal caused the glider to enter a steep descending spiral. The pilot could not recover the aircraft from the spiral and the airspeed quickly exceeded Vne. The pilot then reported that the right wing failed and he bailed out.

The BFU has recorded four incidents/accidents with the single-seat versions. Three events are known of non-injury accidents during off-field landings, and one fatal accident was due to collision with a mountain.

Additionally, during training for the World Gliding Championships in New Zealand in 1995, a Nimbus-4 (owned by the French Air Force) was destroyed in a midair breakup accident. The glider entered a wave cloud, lost control, and broke up at a speed beyond 400 km/h (The never exceed speed, or "Vne" is 285 km/h, and the design dive speed, or "Vd", is 324 km/h). The pilot survived by bailing out.

According to the LBA, "As far as we know, none of the incidents/accidents recorded indicated a technical failure."

== Variants ==
The Nimbus-4DM is a model of the "Nimbus-4 Family," which consists of single-seat and two-seat gliders and motor gliders. The engine in each motor glider retracts into the fuselage, behind the cockpit. The different models are (production data as of 1999):

- Nimbus-4: a single-seat glider, type certified in Germany January 1, 1994. Total number produced: 11
- Nimbus-4T: a single-seat self-sustaining motor glider, type certified in Germany June 15, 1993. Total number produced: 12
- Nimbus-4M: a single-seat self-launching motor glider, type certified in Germany January 1, 1994. Total number produced: 10
- Nimbus-4D: a two-seat glider, type certified in Germany February 24, 1995. Total number produced: 9
- Nimbus-4DT: a two-seat self-sustaining motor glider, type certified in Germany May 5, 1995. Total number produced: 6
- Nimbus-4DM: a two-seat self-launching motor glider, type certified in Germany November 7, 1995. Total number produced: 37
- Nimbus-4DL: a two-seat glider with extended fuselage for tall people
- Nimbus-4DLT: a two-seat self-sustaining motor glider and extended fuselage for tall people
- Nimbus-4DLM: a two-seat self-launching motor glider and extended fuselage for tall people

== Specifications (4DM unless otherwise specified) ==
Data from

General characteristics

- Crew: 1 (or 2 in type "D" variants only)
- Length: 7.83 m (25 ft 8 in)
- Wingspan: 26.5 m (87 ft 0 in)
- Wing area: 17.86 m^{2} (192.24 sq ft)
- Aspect ratio: 38.8
- Empty weight: 595 kg (1,312 lb)
- Gross weight: 820 kg (1,808 lb)
- Powerplant: 1 × Rotax 535C , 33 kW (44 hp) (in type "M" variants only)
- Powerplant: 1 × SOLO 2350 , 19.6 kW (26.3 hp) (in type "T" variants only)

Performance

- Maximum speed: 285 km/h (177 mph, 157 kn)
- Cruise speed: 142 km/h (88 mph, 78 kn)
- Maximum glide ratio: 60:1
- Rate of sink: 0.38 m/s (75 ft/min)

== See also ==
- List of gliders
