= Glaser-Dirks DG-500 =

German two-seat glider, 1987

DG-500
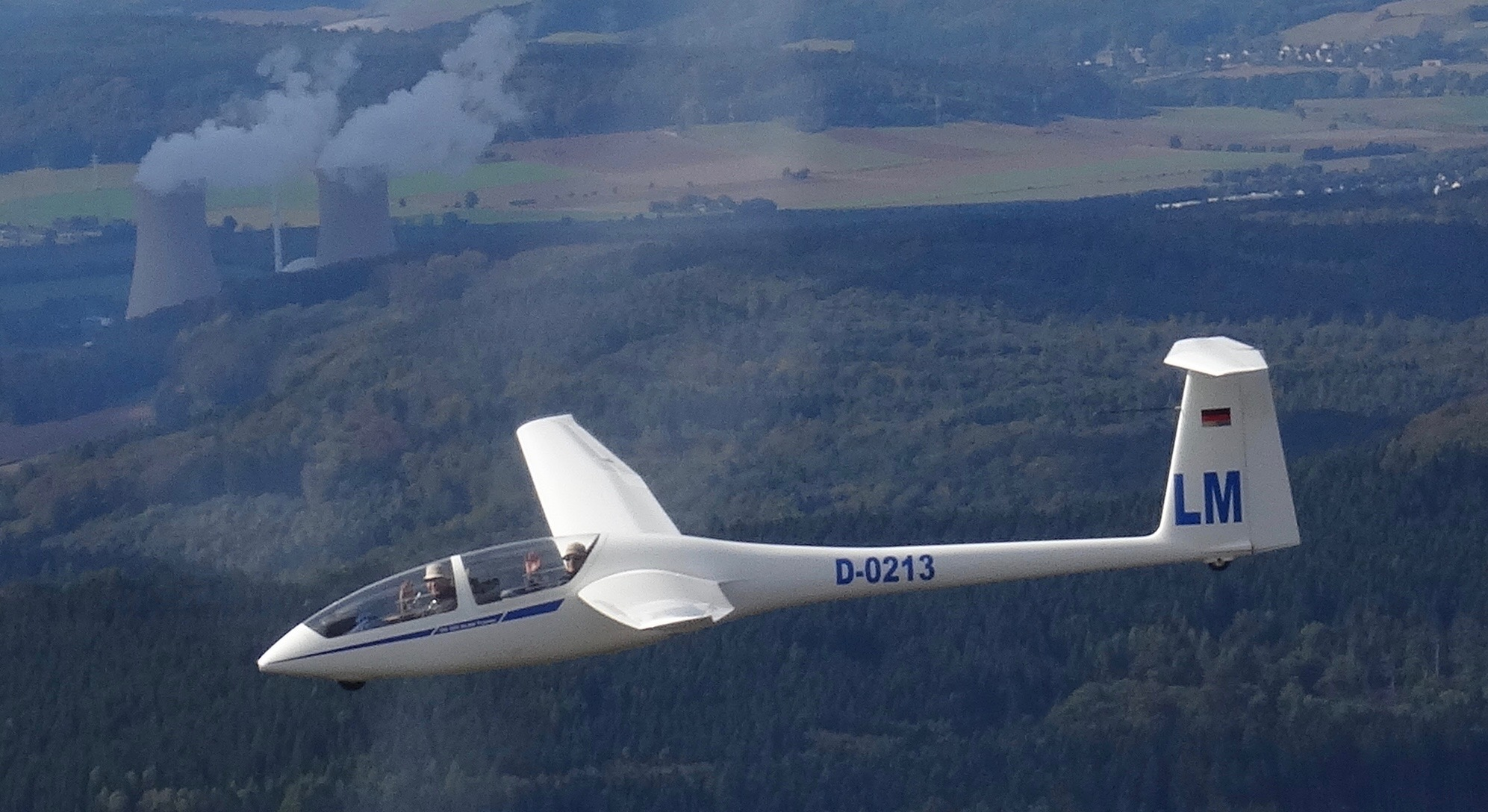
- Glaser-Dirks DG-505

General information
- Type: Two Seater Class sailplane
- National origin: Germany
- Manufacturer: Glaser-Dirks

History
- First flight: 19 March 1987

The Glaser-Dirks DG-500, and later the DG-505, is a two-seat glider of glass-reinforced plastic and carbon fiber reinforced plastic construction, manufactured in the DG Flugzeugbau GmbH in Bruchsal, Germany. It first flew in 1987.

== Design ==
The glider is a trainer with an 18-metre wingspan or a high-performance glider with 20 or 22 m span. There are also trailing edge flaps with the exception of the Trainer and Orion variants. The 20m version also has winglets. The fuselage has a single wheel main landing gear which retracts into the lower fuselage.

The DG-500/18 is mainly intended for flight training, and is fully aerobatic with +7/-5 g rating. There is also a motorglider version, the DG-500M. The DG-500/22 can carry up to 160 kg of water ballast which is not possible on the trainer version. Since 2004, the latest version of the DG-500 has been built as the "DG-505 Orion" in Slovenia.

== Past altitude record ==
The DG-500 once held the all-time altitude record for manned gliders, at 15,460 m (50,720 ft), set on 29 August 2006 by Steve Fossett and Einar Enevoldson, breaking the previous record by 1,713 ft (522 m). It was a standard DG-500M but the engine had been removed and replaced with liquid oxygen tanks. Additional instruments were installed powered by non-rechargeable batteries. The canopy had double-wall glazing and there was a drogue parachute for an emergency descent from high altitude. Pressure suits were worn. The glider is on display at the Seattle Museum of Flight. A new altitude record of 52,172 ft (15,902 m) was set by the Windward Performance Perlan II on September 3, 2017.

== Variants ==
DG-500
Initial production with 18 m (59 ft) span wings.
DG-500/18
Aerobatic version
DG-500/22
high performance sailplane with 22 m (72 ft) span wings
DG-500M
Motorglider version of the DG-500, powered by a retractable pylon mounted 44.7 kW (59.9 hp) Rotax 535C engine
DG-500T Elan Trainer
18 m (59 ft) span wings, fixed undercarriage, no flaps, full controls in both cockpits.
DG-505
improved DG-500
DG-505 Orion
Production version built in Slovenia
DG-505MB
Motorglider version of the DG-505 with a retractable Solo 2625-02 47 kW (63 hp) engine

== Specifications (Elan Trainer) ==
Data from Jane's All the World's Aircraft 1988-89,

General characteristics

- Crew: 2
- Length: 8.66 m (28 ft 5 in)
- Wingspan: 18 m (59 ft 1 in)
- Height: 1.8 m (5 ft 11 in)
- Wing area: 16.6 m^{2} (179 sq ft)
- Aspect ratio: 19.52
- Airfoil: root:Wortmann FX-73-K-170/20; tip:FX-73-K-170/22
- Empty weight: 390 kg (860 lb)
- Max takeoff weight: 630 kg (1,389 lb)

Performance

- Stall speed: 65 km/h (40 mph, 35 kn) at 470 kg (1,040 lb)
- Never exceed speed: 270 km/h (170 mph, 150 kn) in smooth air

197 km/h (106 kn; 122 mph) in rough air
197 km/h (106 kn; 122 mph) on aero-tow
140 km/h (76 kn; 87 mph) on winch launch

- g limits: +5.3 - 2.65
- Maximum glide ratio: 40 at 109 km/h (59 kn; 68 mph)
- Wing loading: 37.95 kg/m^{2} (7.77 lb/sq ft)

== See also ==
Aircraft of comparable role, configuration, and era

- Schempp-Hirth Duo Discus

Related lists

- List of gliders
