= Schempp-Hirth Nimbus-2 =

German single-seat glider, 1971

Nimbus-2
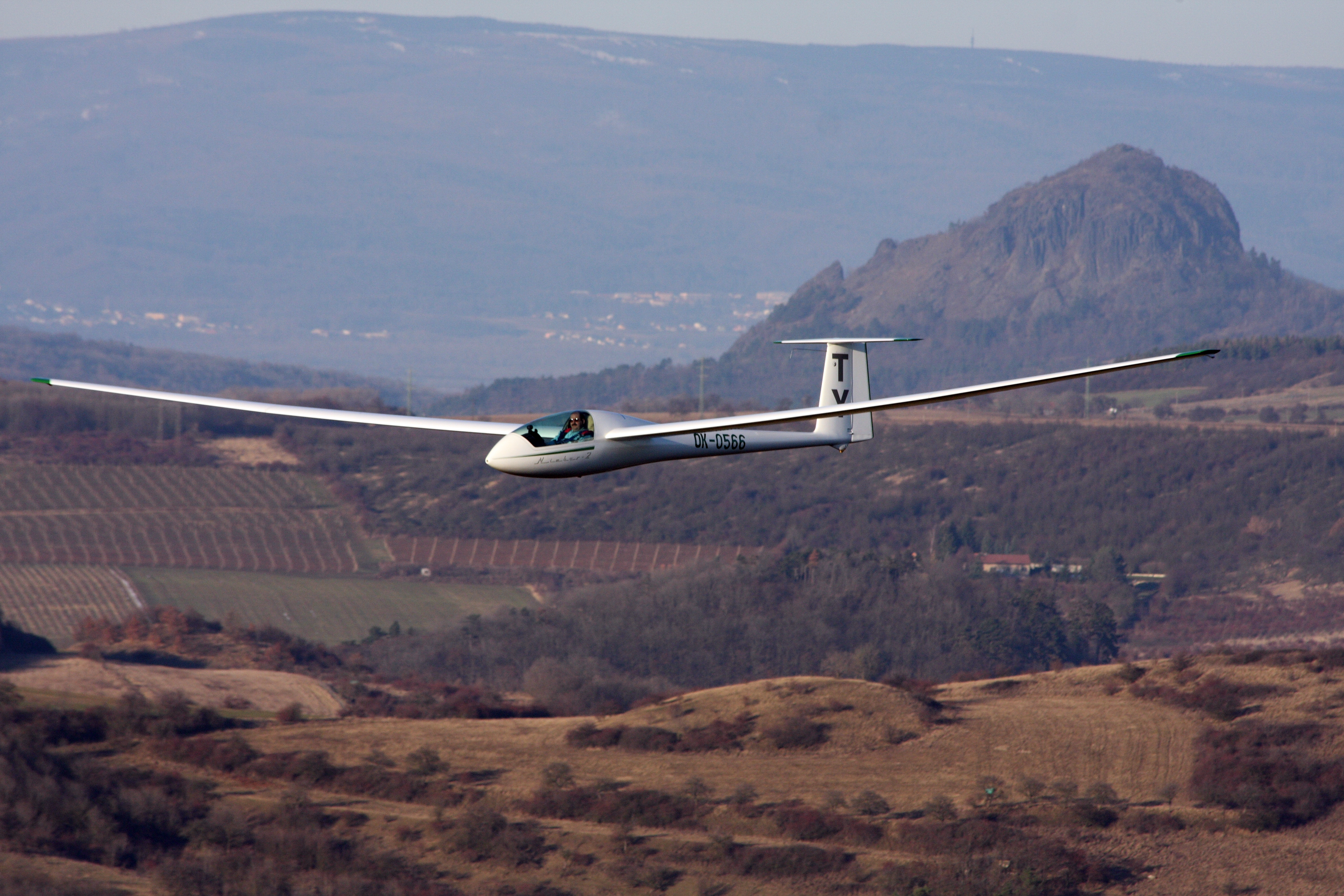
- Schempp-Hirth Nimbus-2

General information
- Type: Open-class sailplane
- National origin: Germany
- Manufacturer: Schempp-Hirth
- Designer: Klaus Holighaus
- Number built: 243

History
- First flight: April 1971

The Schempp-Hirth Nimbus-2 is an Open Class glider built by Schempp-Hirth during the 1970s. The Nimbus-2 first flew in April 1971 and a total of over 240 examples of all subtypes have been built until the beginning of the 1980s. It replaced the Schempp-Hirth Cirrus.

== Design and development ==
Loosely based on the original Nimbus HS-3 prototype, the production version that eventually surfaced as the Nimbus-2 was a very different glider with many improvements over the problematic prototype. The wing was shortened to 20.3 metres and was built in four sections to make it easier to rig and transport. It received Schempp-Hirth air brakes fitted in the upper surfaces and a tail braking-parachute, plus camber-changing flaps. It had an all-flying T-tail similar to the Standard Cirrus as well as the general layout of its fuselage.

The Nimbus-2 was successful in competitions, twice winning the Open Class in World Gliding Championships: Göran Ax (Sweden) in 1972 and George Moffat (USA) in 1974. It was also popular with record-seekers. Bruce Lindsey Drake, David Napier Speight and Sholto Hamilton "Dick" Georgeson jointly set a World Goal and Free Distance record of 1,254 km in New Zealand in 1978, Doris Grove a feminine Out and Return record of 1,127 km in 1981, Yvonne Loader a feminine Height Gain record of 10212 m in 1988, and Joann Shaw a feminine Distance record of 951.43 km in 1990, all flying Nimbus-2. At its time several national and world records were held by Nimbus-2M's in the FAI motorglider category. In 1979 Klaus Holighaus, the glider's designer, completed the first 1,000 km triangle in Germany flying a Nimbus-2.

The Nimbus-2 was succeeded by the Schempp-Hirth Nimbus-3.

== Variants ==
Nimbus-2
All-flying tailplane variant, serial numbers up to 85
Nimbus-2B
With a fixed incidence horizontal tail to improve pitch control behaviour
Nimbus-2C
Lighter variant with higher maximum certified flight mass, new trailing-edge combined airbrakes-flaps derived from the Glasflügel 303 Mosquito in place of the upper surface air brakes, and carbon-fibre wings and tailplane. Several other improvements took place during the production run without changes to the type designation.
Nimbus-2CS
Single example (serial number 192) with reduced fuselage weight, an increased span of 23.5 m, an enlarged rudder and several other modifications.
Nimbus-2M
Self-launching version with a retractable engine. It is based on the Nimbus-2 (not 2b) but the wing is 15 cm further aft on the fuselage to make up for the C of G shift induced by the weight of the engine (7 built)
Skopil Nimbus II-S
Motorglider conversion done by Arnold Skopil of Aberdeen, Washington, United States using a Nelson H-63 engine of 45 hp (34 kW). One converted.

== Specifications (Nimbus 2) ==
Data from Jane's all the World's Aircraft 1976–77

General characteristics

- Crew: 1
- Capacity: 160 kg (350 lb) water ballast
- Length: 7.33 m (24 ft 1 in)
- Wingspan: 20.3 m (66 ft 7 in)
- Height: 1.45 m (4 ft 9 in)
- Wing area: 14.4 m^{2} (155 sq ft)
- Aspect ratio: 28.62
- Airfoil: root: Wortmann FX 67-K-170/17 (17%); tip: Wortmann FX 67-K-150/17 (15%)
- Empty weight: 350 kg (772 lb)
- Gross weight: 470 kg (1,036 lb) maximum without water ballast
- Max takeoff weight: 580 kg (1,279 lb) with water ballast

Performance

- Stall speed: 64 km/h (40 mph, 34 kn) at W/S 32 kg/m2
- Never exceed speed: 270 km/h (168 mph, 146 kn)
- Max aerotow speed: 160 km/h (99 mph; 86 kn)
- Max winch launch speed: 120 km/h (75 mph; 65 kn)
- g limits: +10.5
- Maximum glide ratio: 49 at 105 km/h (65 mph; 57 kn)
- Rate of sink: 0.53 m/s (104 ft/min) at 90 km/h (56 mph; 49 kn)
- Wing loading: 40 kg/m^{2} (8.2 lb/sq ft) with water ballast

32.6 kg/m^{2} (6.7 lb/sq ft) without water ballast

== See also ==
Aircraft of comparable role, configuration, and era

- LAK-9
- LAK-12
- Schleicher ASW 17

Related lists

- List of gliders
