= Schempp-Hirth SHK =

German single-seat glider, 1965

SHK
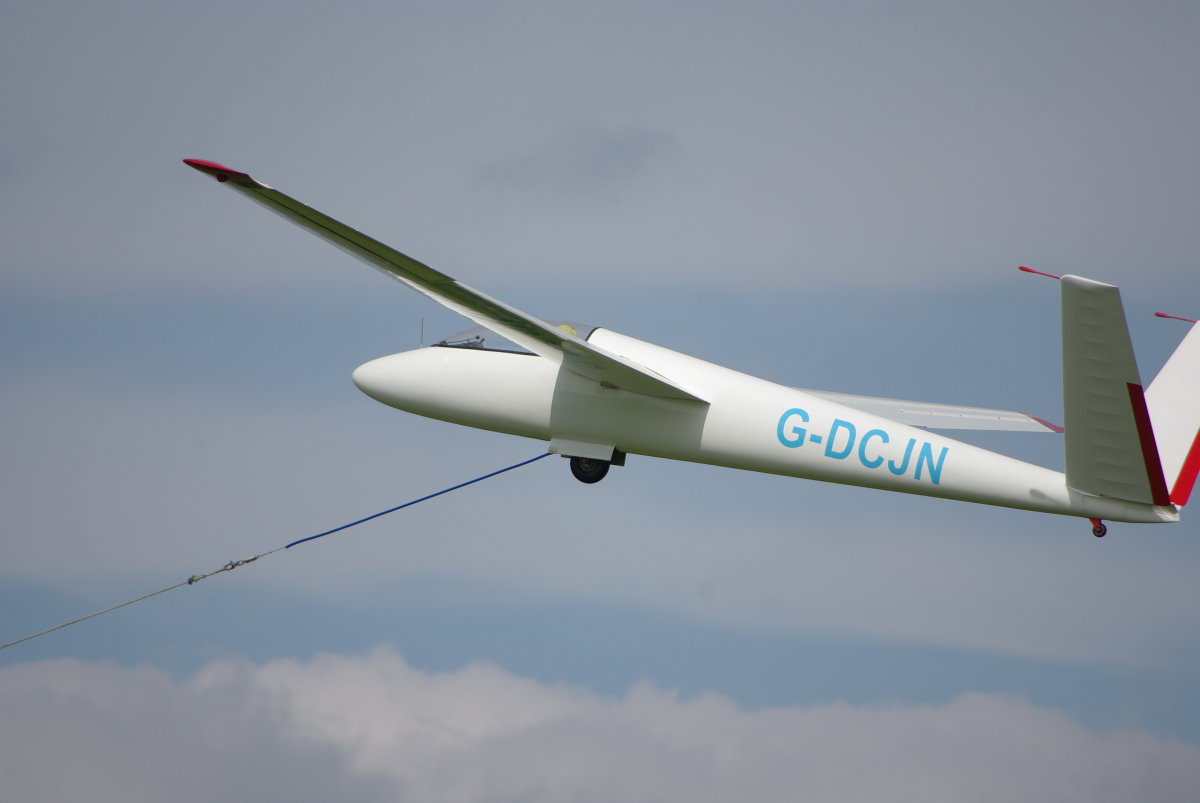

General information
- Type: Glider
- National origin: Germany
- Manufacturer: Schempp-Hirth
- Designer: Klaus Holighaus
- Number built: 59

History
- First flight: 1965

The Schempp-Hirth SHK Open Class glider was developed in Germany by Schempp-Hirth. It was based on the 1964 version of the Standard Austria, known as the SH. The Austria was originally a single-seat aerobatic glider that had been designed and built in Austria from 1959 but production was moved in 1962 to the Schempp-Hirth factory in Germany.

== Development ==
In addition to its larger span, the SHK's V-tail surfaces were 50% larger than the Austria and there were other improvements. The tailplane was "all-moving", mass-balanced, and had aerodynamic trim tabs. An SHK flown by Rolf Kuntz finished in 3rd place in the Open Class of the 1965 World Gliding Championships at South Cerney in England. In 1967 a model with improved comfort for the pilot was introduced and a tail chute was provided. The SHK was probably the last mainly wooden Open Class glider to be developed before glass fiber aircraft became available.

== Specifications (SHK) ==
General characteristics

- Crew: 1
- Length: 6.3 m (20 ft 8 in)
- Wingspan: 17 m (55 ft 5.25 in)
- Wing area: 14.68 m^{2} (158.2 sq ft)
- Aspect ratio: 20.2:1
- Airfoil: Eppler 266
- Empty weight: 260 kg (573 lb)
- Gross weight: 370 kg (816 lb)

Performance

- Maximum speed: 200 km/h (124 mph, 108 kn)
- g limits: +4, -2
- Maximum glide ratio: 38:1 at 87 km/h (47 kts/54 mph)
- Rate of sink: 0.61 m/s (118 ft/min) at 75 km/h (40 kts/47 mph)

== See also ==
Related development

- Vogt Lo-170

Aircraft of comparable role, configuration, and era

- SZD-19 Zefir

Related lists

- List of gliders
