= Schempp-Hirth Cirrus =

German single-seat glider, 1967

Cirrus
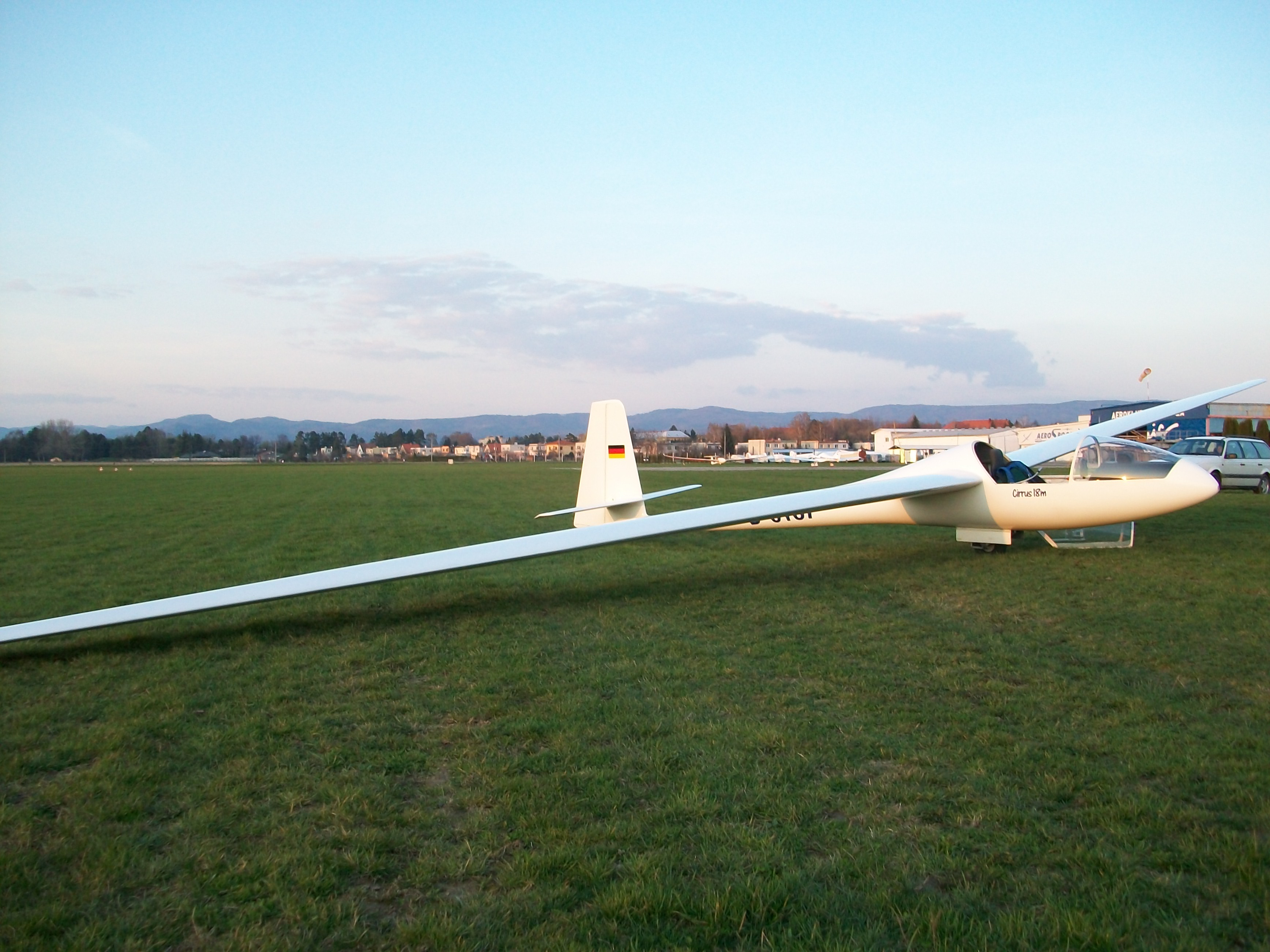

General information
- Type: Open-class sailplane
- National origin: Germany
- Manufacturer: Schempp-Hirth
- Designer: Klaus Holighaus
- Number built: 183

History
- First flight: 1967

The Schempp-Hirth Cirrus is an Open Class glider built by Schempp-Hirth between 1967 and 1971 and by VTC until 1977. It was replaced by the Nimbus 2.

== Development ==
The Cirrus was designed by Dipl.-Ing. Klaus Holighaus and was the first glass-fibre glider to be built by Schempp-Hirth. The prototype flew in 1967 with a V-tail like the Austria. It won the German Open Class in 1967.

By 1971, 107 Cirrus had been built in Germany. Production was transferred to Vazduhoplovno Tehnicki Centar (VTC) at Vršac in Yugoslavia where an additional 63 were built.

Harro Wodl won the 1968 World Gliding Championships in the open class, flying a Cirrus.

== Design ==
Although Holighaus had designed and built the ground-breaking D-36 together with Gerhard Waibel, Wolf Lemke and Walter Schneider, he followed a completely different design philosophy for the Cirrus, preferring a thicker airfoil and the use of PVC foam instead of balsa as a core material.

The resultant Cirrus has mid-set cantilever wings with a span of 17.74 metres, and a conventional low-set cruciform tailplane. It can carry water-ballast in the wings. There are no flaps. For glidepath control, there are effective top-and-bottom air brakes and a substantial drag chute built into the bottom of the rudder. The undercarriage is retractable.

=== Aerodynamics ===
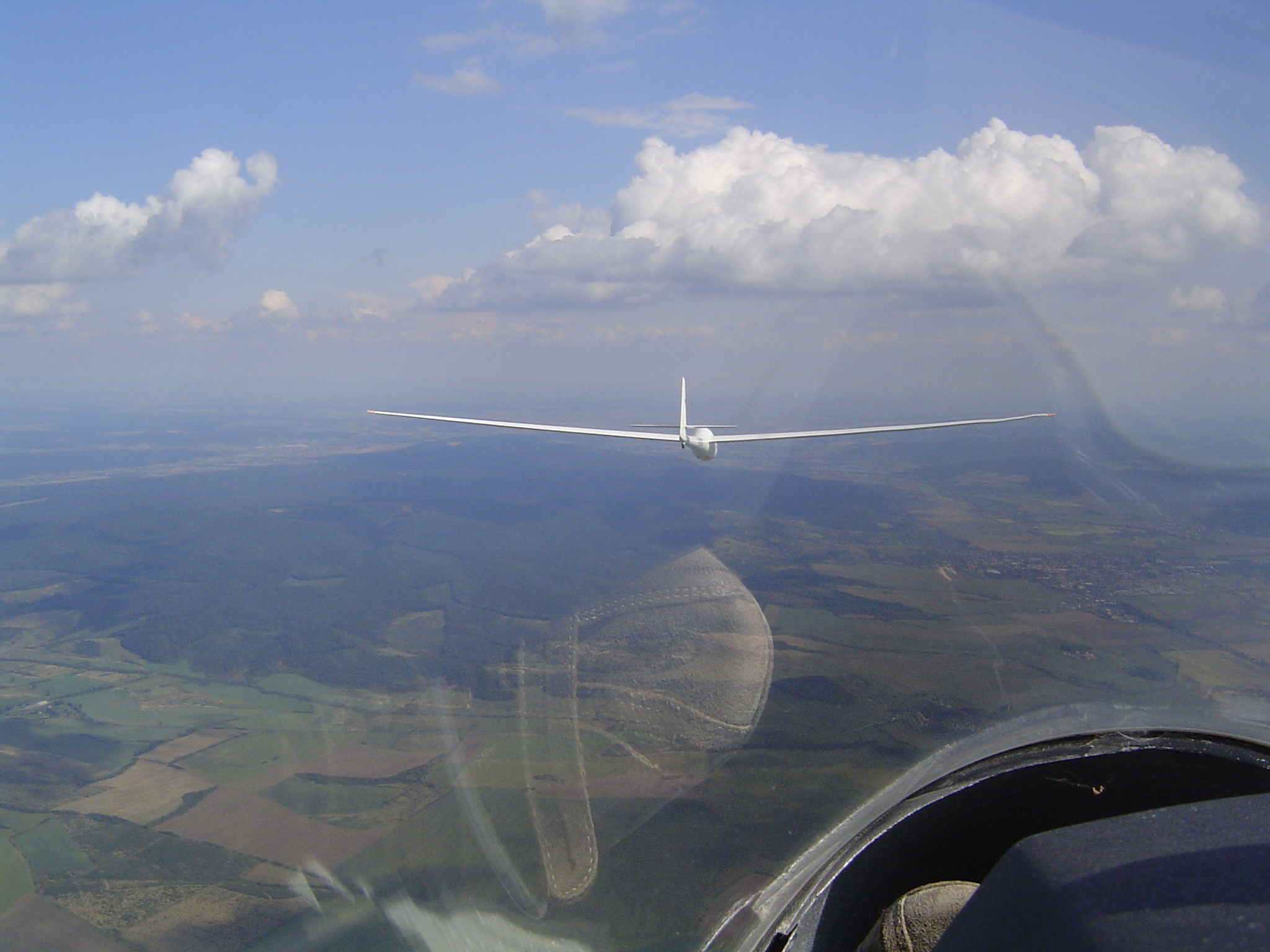
Cirrus in flight

Holighaus chose a rather thick flapless Wortmann airfoil (FX 66-196/161) which had low drag (for the time) and very gentle stall characteristics. The span and profile are optimised for the weaker gliding weather of central Europe. The result is excellent thermalling characteristics and a high glide ratio (for 1967).

=== Construction ===
All-fiberglass glider, with foam core sandwiches for the wing skins and fuselage bulkheads. Internal tubular-steel frame interconnects the wings, cockpit and landing gear, carrying the flight and landing stresses. This steel frame is bolted to the fiberglass shell.

The Cirrus was built in female moulds, an innovation that became the standard method for all manufacturers.

== Variants ==
- The first prototype had an all-flying V-tail.
- The original Cirrus has a span of 17,74m. Sometimes it is called Open Cirrus.
- Cirrus VTC were produced in Yugoslavia under license by the Vazduhoplovno Tehnicki Centar in Vršac.

== Developments ==
- Standard Cirrus, Standard Cirrus VTC and Standard Cirrus 75 have a wingspan of 15m and a T-tail.

== Specifications ==
General characteristics

- Crew: One
- Capacity: 98 kg (215 lb) water ballast
- Length: 7.20 m (23 ft 8 in)
- Wingspan: 17.74 m (58 ft 2 in)
- Height: 1.70 m (5 ft 7 in)
- Wing area: 12.6 m^{2} (136 sq ft)
- Aspect ratio: 24.9
- Airfoil: FX 66-196, FX 60-126 (tips)
- Empty weight: 276 kg (607 lb)
- Gross weight: 400 kg (880 lb)

Performance

- Maximum glide ratio: 44
- Rate of sink: 0.50 m/s (98 ft/min)

== See also ==
Aircraft of comparable role, configuration, and era

- Glasflügel 401
- Glasflügel BS-1
- Schleicher ASW 12

Related lists

- List of gliders
