= Schempp-Hirth =

German aircraft manufacturer, founded 1935

Company logo

Schempp-Hirth Flugzeugbau GmbH is a glider manufacturer based in Kirchheim unter Teck, Germany.

== History ==
Martin Schempp founded his own company in Göppingen in 1935, with the assistance of Wolf Hirth.

The company was initially called "Sportflugzeugbau Göppingen Martin Schempp". In 1938, Wolf Hirth, mainly responsible for the design work, officially became a partner in the company, which then became "Sportflugzeugbau Schempp-Hirth". The company relocated to Kirchheim unter Teck the same year.

The company's first product was the Göppingen Gö 1 Wolf glider, conceived as a rival to the ubiquitous Grunau Baby, but real success came with the Göppingen Gö 3 Minimoa the same year.

During World War II, the company built DFS Habicht training gliders, as well as tailplane assemblies for the Messerschmitt Bf 109. The company also built a research aircraft, the Göppingen Gö 9 to investigate Claude Dornier's rear-mounted "pusher" propeller plans. With its cruciform tail, this aircraft was to be a stepping-stone towards the revolutionary Dornier Do 335 Pfeil.

After the war, forbidden by the allied occupation from building aircraft, the company manufactured beds, wheelbarrows, radio cabinets, and other furniture. In 1951, the prohibitions were lifted and the company returned to sailplane building.

Wolf Hirth died in 1959 but it was not until 1964 that Martin Schempp found a new designer: Klaus Holighaus who had just graduated from Darmstadt Technical University, where he was a member of its Akaflieg. Holighaus was also an excellent pilot and became a regular member of the German gliding team.

Additional technical expertise was recruited in 1970 and Holighaus became Chief Executive in 1972. From 1977 Holighaus was the sole owner of the business.

After Holighaus's death in a gliding accident in 1994, control of the company passed to his widow and sons, all of whom are keen glider pilots.

It employs about 100 people, and is currently managed by Tilo Holighaus and Brigitte Holighaus.

The company has often sub-contracted work, and has issued licences for other companies to build its designs.

== Aircraft produced ==
Schempp-Hirth aircraft include:

- Göppingen Gö 1 Wolf sailplane, 1935
- Göppingen Gö 2 improved Grunau 8, 1935
- Göppingen Gö 3 Minimoa sailplane, 1936
- Göppingen Gö 4 two-seat sailplane, 1938
- Göppingen Gö 5 Hütter H 17 sailplane, 1938
- Göppingen Gö 6 Minimoa Mo 2a two-seat sailplane, 1937
- Göppingen Gö 7 two-seat sport aeroplane (not built)
- Göppingen Gö 8 scale model test airframe for Dornier Do 214, 1939
- Göppingen Gö 9 development aircraft for Dornier Do 335 Pfeil, 1941
- Standard Austria
- Schempp-Hirth SHK
- Cirrus
- Standard Cirrus
- Discus
- Discus-2
- Ventus
- Ventus-2
- Ventus 3
- Nimbus
- Nimbus-2
- Nimbus-3
- Nimbus-4
- Mini-Nimbus
- Janus
- Duo Discus
- Arcus
- Quintus
