= Schempp-Hirth Standard Austria =

German single-seat aerobatic glider, 1959

Standard Austria
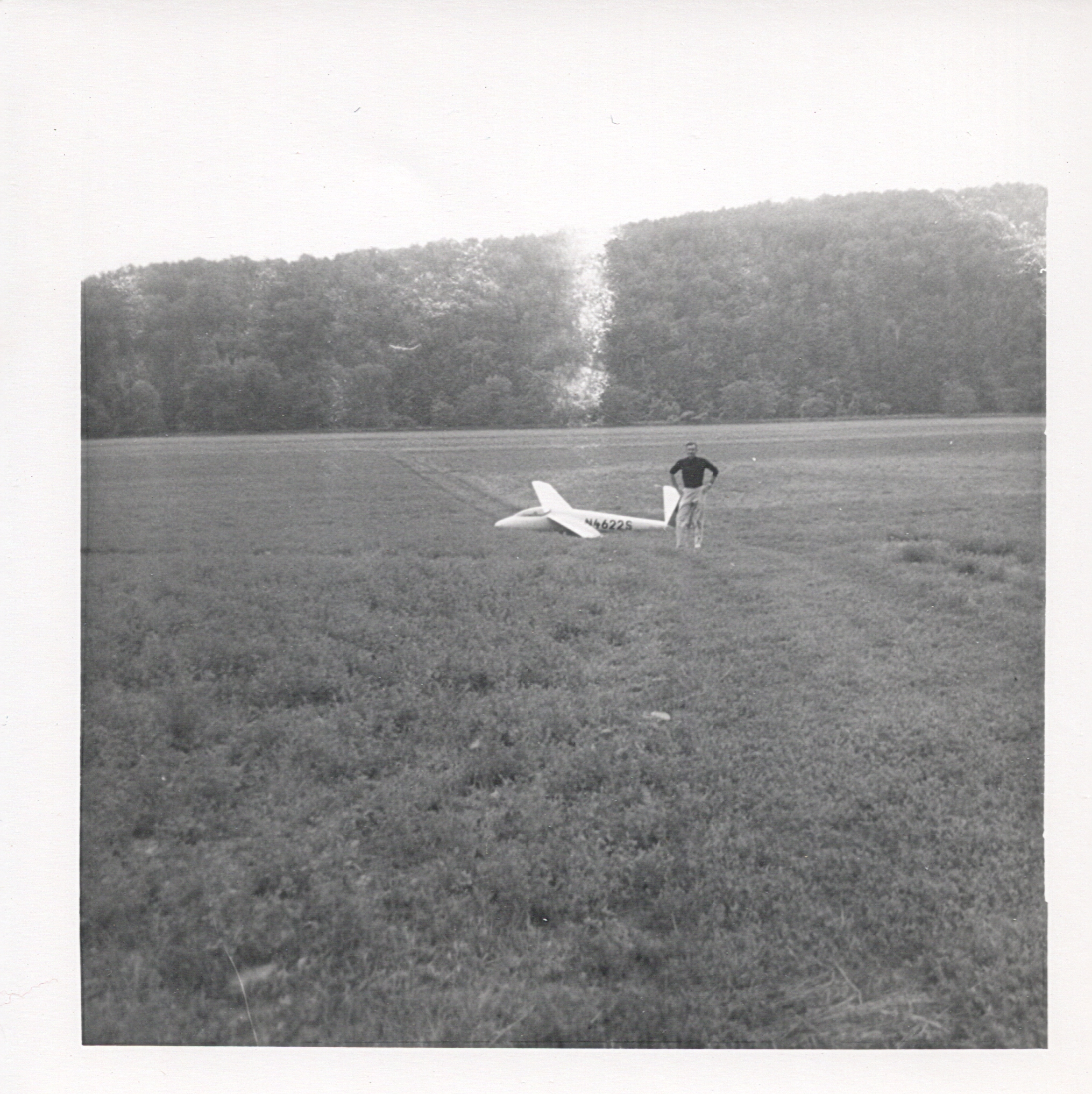

General information
- Type: Glider
- National origin: Austria
- Manufacturer: Schempp-Hirth (licensed prod after 14 built in Austria)
- Designer: Rüdiger Kunz
- Number built: 81

History
- First flight: July 1959

The Standard Austria was a single-seat aerobatic glider that was originally designed and built in Austria from 1959 but production was moved in 1962 to Schempp-Hirth in Germany.

== Development ==
Commissioned by the Österreichischer Aeroclub – (Austrian Aero club) the Standard Austria was designed by Rüdiger Kunz to compete in the 1960 OSTIV competition for a standard class sailplane, winning plaudits as the best standard class aircraft. The design aims were to produce an aircraft with a low wing loading and a high lift/drag ratio, which necessitated low weight and low drag. To achieve the design aims the Standard Austria was constructed primarily of wood with plywood skinning and a glass-fibre nose section, pilots seat and tail-cone. Other weight and drag saving measures included use of an all-moving 'V' or 'Butterfly' tail unit with two surfaces, set in a 'V' configuration, providing stability and control in both pitch and yaw, in exchange for increased cost and complexity of the control systems and minor handling side effects, like slight pitching of the aircraft with application of rudder and vice versa.

After the initial production run in Austria, production was moved to Schempp-Hirth in Germany, where the Standard Austria's development continued with improved and heavier models, optional retractable undercarriage, replacement of the NACA section wings with wings using an Eppler 266 section, to improve low-speed performance.

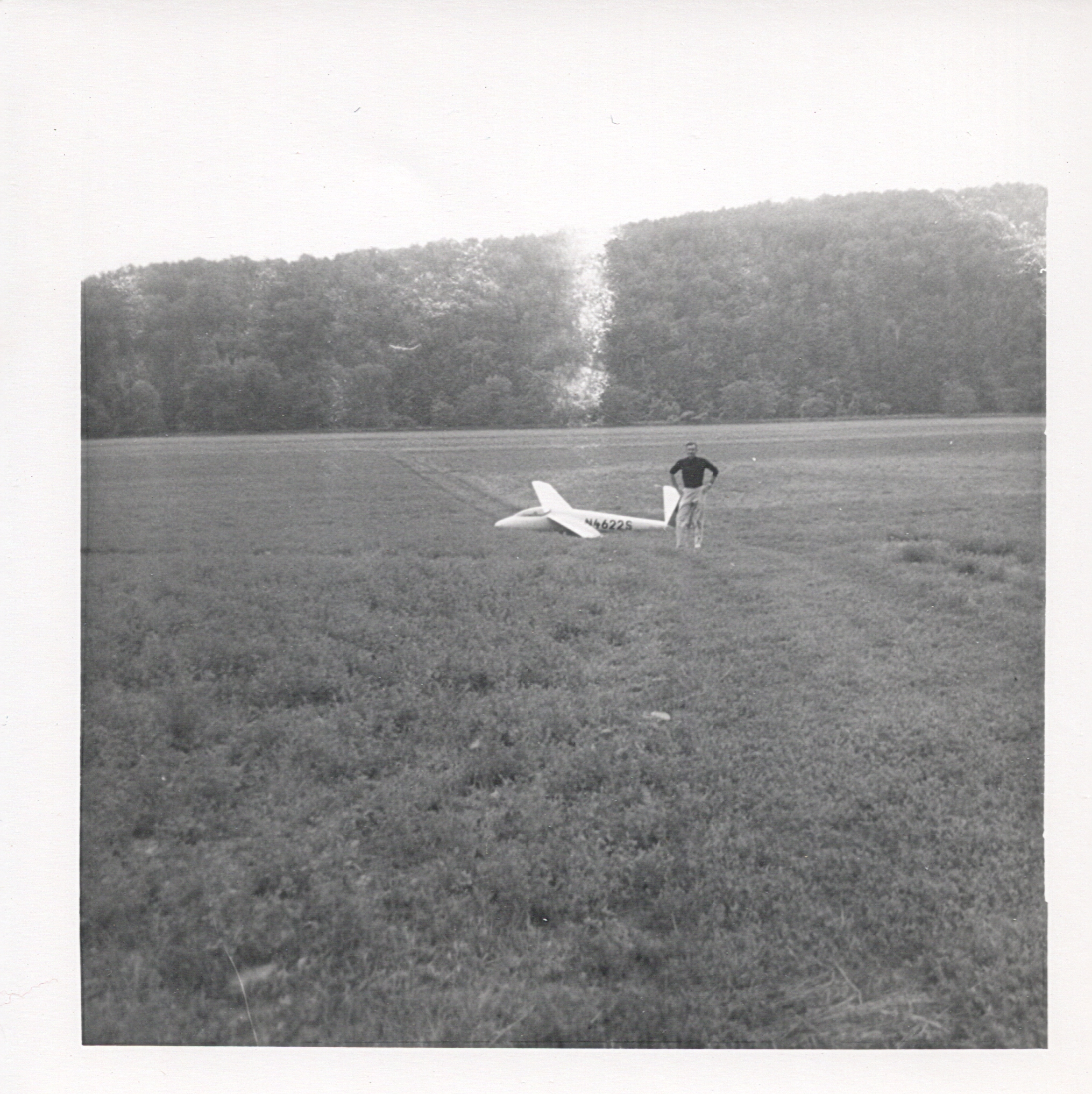
Ben Greene finds an 'alternative landing strip' for his S-H Standard Austria "22 Sugar" somewhere outside of Elmira, NY, during the 30th National Soaring Championships at Harris Hill, in July, 1963.

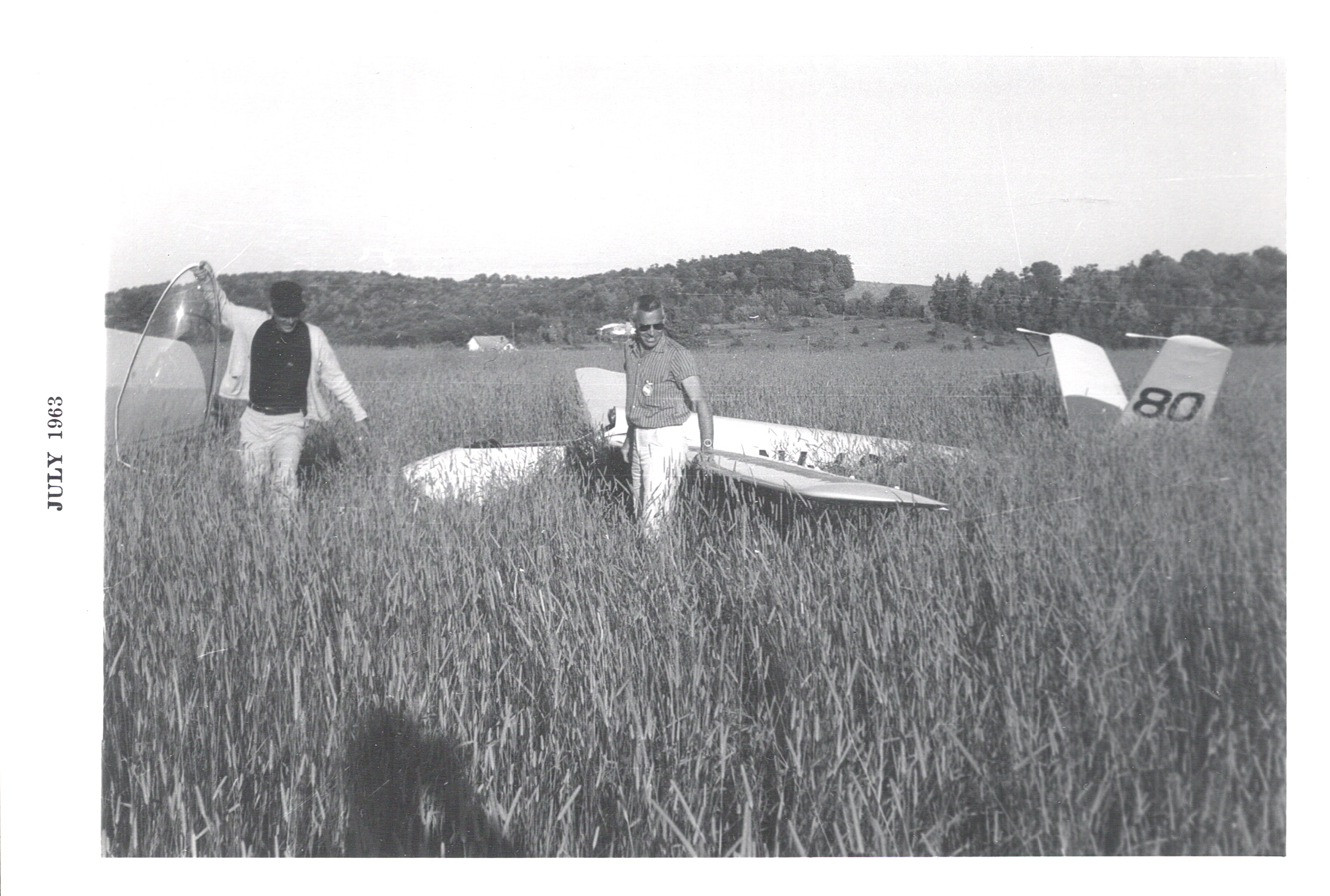
Ben Greene finds '...some expensive wheat...' in which to place "22 Sugar" during the 30th National Soaring Championships, somewhere near Horseheads, NY, July, 1963.

Two were used in the 1967 NFB film 'Flight' (CF-RNH, CF-RSO).

== Variants ==
Standard Austria
Initial production model built in Austria.
Standard Austria S
Production aircraft built by Schemp-Hirth under license in Germany.
Standard Austria SH
Improved heavier model, 5 built.
Standard Austria SH-I
The SH with retractable undercarriage
Standard Austria
From 1964 produced using an Eppler 266 aerofoil section.

The Schempp-Hirth SHK, a 17-meter Open Class glider, was also developed by Klaus Holighaus in 1965 from the SH-1.

== Specifications (Standard Austria) ==
Data from The World's Sailplanes:Die Segelflugzeuge der Welt:Les Planeurs du Monde Volume II

General characteristics

- Crew: 1
- Length: 6.2 m (20 ft 4 in)
- Wingspan: 15 m (49 ft 3 in)
- Wing area: 13.5 m^{2} (145 sq ft)
- Aspect ratio: 16.7
- Airfoil: NACA 65_{2} 415
- Empty weight: 205 kg (452 lb)
- Gross weight: 323 kg (712 lb)

Performance

- Stall speed: 55 km/h (34 mph, 30 kn)
- Never exceed speed: 250 km/h (160 mph, 130 kn)
- Rough air speed max: 140 km/h (87 mph; 76 kn)
- Aerotow speed: 140 km/h (87 mph; 76 kn)
- Winch launch speed: 95 km/h (59 mph; 51 kn)
- Terminal velocity: with full airbrakes 250 km/h (160 mph; 130 kn)
- g limits: +8 -0 at 230 km/h (140 mph; 120 kn)
- Maximum glide ratio: 34 at 105 km/h (65 mph; 57 kn)
- Rate of sink: 0.7 m/s (140 ft/min) at 70 km/h (43 mph; 38 kn)
- Wing loading: 24 kg/m^{2} (4.9 lb/sq ft)

== See also ==
Related development

- Vogt Lo-170

Aircraft of comparable role, configuration, and era

- Schleicher Ka-6E
- SZD-24 Foka

Related lists

- List of gliders
