= Gliding competition =

Competitions in the sport of gliding

Competition grid at 2004 UK Standard Class Nationals, Aston Down

Some of the pilots in the sport of gliding take part in gliding competitions. These are usually racing competitions, but there are also aerobatic contests and on-line league tables.

== History of competitions ==
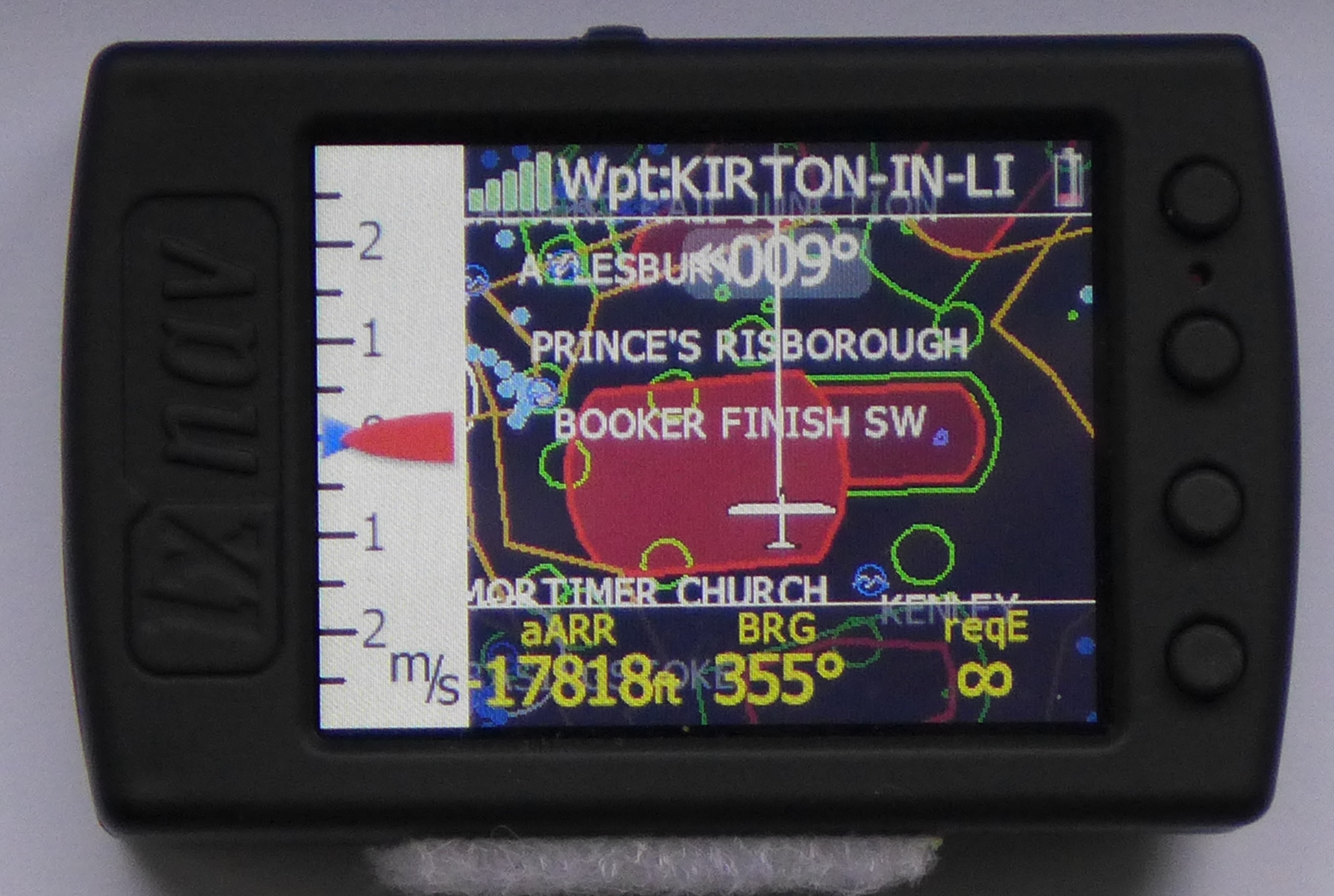
A typical GPS logger used to record flights of sailplanes for competitions and badge claims. It also provides navigational information about the next turn-points and areas of controlled airspace.

In the early days, the main goal was to stay airborne for as long as possible. However, flights could last for days and some pilots killed themselves by falling asleep. This type of duration contest was abandoned by 1939.

From the earliest days of gliding there was also 'free distance' flying. Pilots launched themselves from a hill top, attempting to glide as far as possible. Once pilots learned to exploit ridge lift and thermals, flights could be extended further. Eventually they mastered flying from thermal to thermal, resulting in ever longer retrieves. As the pilots and gliders became better, the winner of a competition day might fly so far that they could not get back to the competition site for the next day. Turn-points were therefore used. Those pilots who managed to fly all the way to the turn-point and back would score the same distance as for free distance flights. When pilots and gliders became even better, most of the pilots would complete the task. Points were then awarded for speed.

Initially, observers would be stationed at the turn-points to verify that the pilots rounded them. Large easily seen contest numbers (sometimes in addition to the glider's registration) were, and still are, located on the bottom of one wing, and each side of the fin, to ease identification. As the years progressed, pilots used (film) cameras to photograph each turnpoint from the air to prove that they had rounded each one and a barograph to prove that they had not landed en route. Today, all tracking methods have been totally replaced with GPS-based FAI approved flight recorders to (securely) log their positions and flight so that they can prove that the task was correctly completed. The flight recorder is usually part of the navigational instruments of the glider, but sometimes a separate logger (see picture) is carried, mainly as a back-up.

== Present day ==
Modern gliding competitions now comprise closed tasks where everyone races on an aerial route around specified turn-points, plus start and finish points, that brings everybody back to base. The weather forecast and the performance of the gliders, as well as the experience level of the pilots, dictate the length of the task. Today, most of the points are speed points. The general rule is to set the task so that all pilots have a fair chance of completing it, with the fastest pilot gaining the most points for that day.

With the advent of GPS, new types of tasks were introduced such as speed or distance tasks within assigned areas, and speed or distance tasks with pilot-selected turn-points (during flight based on perceived advantages). Despite the use of pilot-selected turn-points made possible by GPS, tasks over a fixed course are still used frequently. In the European Gliding Championships in 2005, a task of 1,011 km was set in the open class; the longest task in an international competition.

The FAI Sporting Code for gliders sets out the rules and procedures to be used to verify soaring performances in competitions and badge flights. The main objective of these rules is to ensure that a consistent level of proof is achieved for all flights.

== Levels of competition ==
Competitions are held at the local, regional, national and international level. Strong performance at the regional level allows pilots to gain a high enough ranking to enter national championships. Thereafter international competitions are available for the most ambitious pilots: the European Gliding Championships, and the World Gliding Championships. Gliding made an appearance as a demonstration sport at the 1936 Olympics. There was also the prestigious Barron Hilton Cup, which was an invitation event for the top pilots. There are now six classes open to both sexes, plus three classes just for women, and two junior classes (See Glider competition classes).

Some competitive classes (Sports Class in the US, Club Class elsewhere) have scoring systems that are handicapped based on the type of glider each pilot is flying. This allows pilots to compete on a relatively equal basis even if their gliders have widely varying performance.

== A typical competition day ==
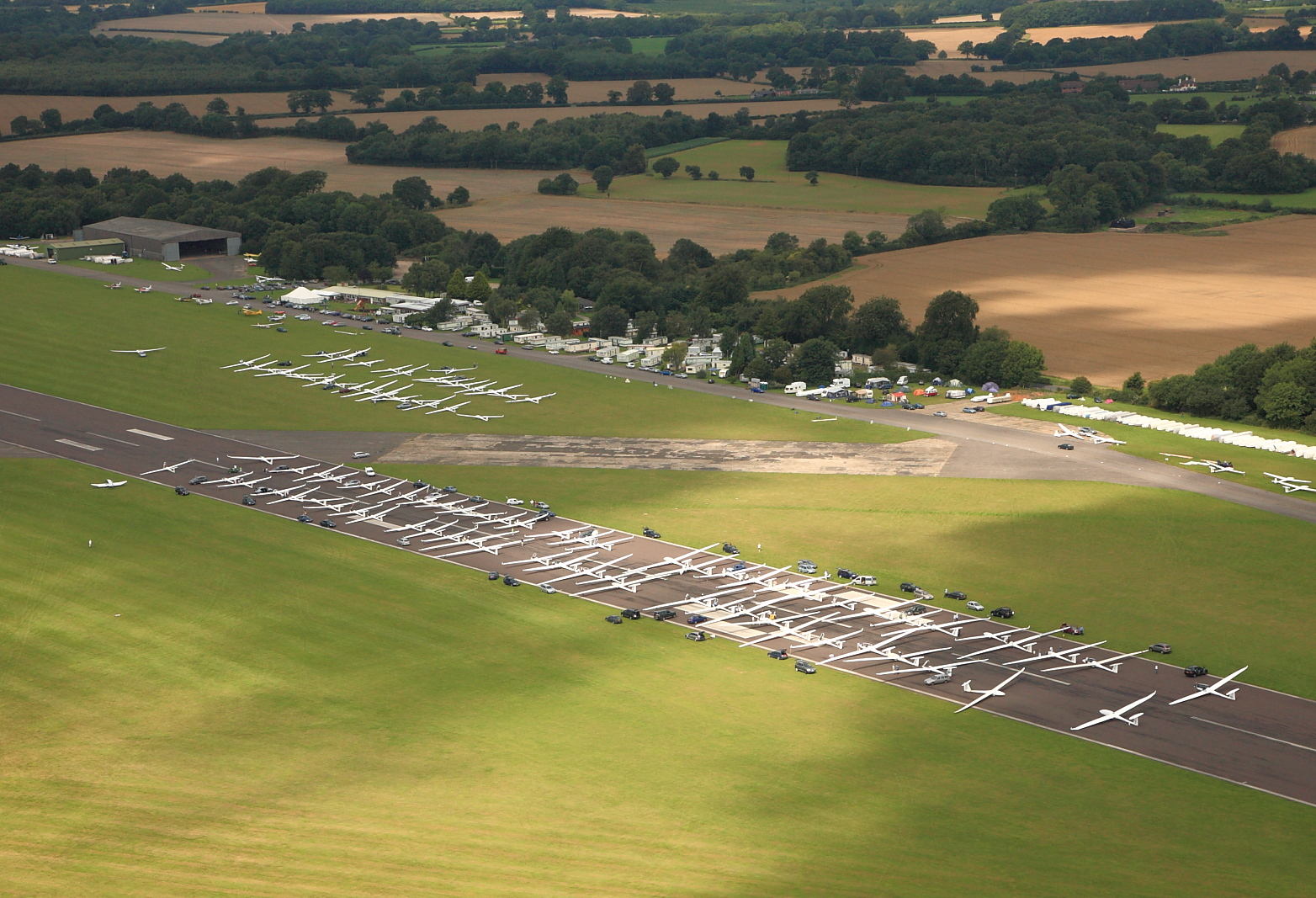
Competition grid at Lasham Airfield in 2009

Gliding contests generally last one week, but international contests last two weeks. Sometimes days are allocated for practice before the contest to allow non-local pilots to familiarize themselves with the contest area.

Each day an initial decision is made as to the likelihood that the conditions for the day are adequate to remain aloft. If so, the pilots are told to prepare (assemble) their gliders and move them onto the runway launch grid and prepare to launch. The order of the gliders on the grid is predetermined for each day and rotates amongst the pilots. The contest pilots gather at the start of each contest day to learn about the day's forecast weather conditions, to obtain briefings on operational and safety related issues, to hear about the previous day's results (if any) and possibly to hear from the previous day's winning pilot(s). Behind the scenes, the weather forecaster will discuss the local predicted conditions for the day with the task-setter (which is sometimes a committee). Once the task for the day has been decided, a pilot's briefing is held to describe the task and provide an update on forecast weather and any airspace restrictions. Often a non-competing pilot will make a preliminary flight to verify conditions aloft (known as a "sniffer"). Launching takes place when the director believes that the gliders can stay airborne.

The task for the day is based on the predicted soaring and weather conditions of the day and is made up of a combination of a minimum time in the air (between 2 and 5 hours) coupled with a collection of locations (turnpoints) which must be overflown (within a specified radius). Some turnpoints may be mandatory, others may be optional, or a combination of both. Some days, the conditions are simply not suitable for flight; these are referred to as "non-contest" days. In a typical 7 day regional contest, at least 3 days must be "contest days" to constitute a valid contest. If every day of the contest can be flown, then at least one day will not be flown (known as a "rest day"), in an effort to increase safety by preventing excessive fatigue.

Launching all the gliders usually takes less than an hour. While gliders are being launched, the other gliders which are already airborne will attempt to remain aloft and stay in the vicinity. Gliders that land due to loss of lift are allowed to relaunch ("re-light") but must wait until all other gliders have been launched at least once. Once all gliders in a class are launched and have had time to get into a position to start, the launch director will announce that the "start gate is open" via radio. This means that pilots can begin flying their assigned task and can start immediately, or might delay their start for tactical or weather-related reasons. The pilot must announce his start time via radio. Each pilot will then attempt to fly the task as quickly as possible.

Some pilots will be unable to find lift at the beginning of the flight and thus must return to the airport for an additional tow (known as a "re-light"), where they will attempt to start their flight again – this is allowed any number of times. If the pilot is unable to find lift during some part of the task he may be forced to 'land out' in a farmer's field or at a distant airfield. Sometimes this is caused by deteriorating weather, sometimes because of rejecting an area of lift and flying on in the hope of finding even better lift (since the object is not to use every encountered lift source as this takes time without any gain in distance). The pilot will garner some contest points even if he has not completed the task for the day. For those that land out, the glider is either de-rigged and towed back in a trailer (always if landing at a non-airport), or (if at an airport) a tow-plane can be sent to re-launch the glider and so return it to base (both cases are known as a "retrieve"). Generally the start and finish locations are at, or quite near to, the home airfield for the contest. If there are severe weather conditions, an alternate "safety finish" location may have to be announced to the competitors.

== Scoring ==
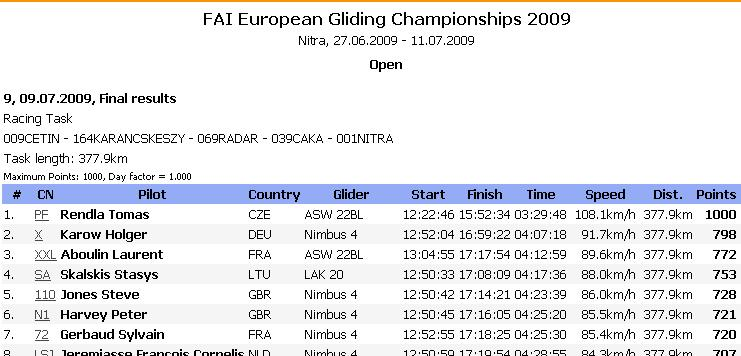
Part of one day's results from 2009 European Championships – Open Class

Each glider carries a device for recording its GPS position every few seconds in a secure format. Following landing, the pilots hand in their loggers to the scorer for downloading. The scorer uses computer software to analyze the resulting GPS data. This provides evidence that the start, turn-points and finish have been legitimately reached. The winner on each competition day is the fastest around the task and is given the maximum score of 1000 points. This score can be devalued if very few gliders get around the task. This is because that luck was probably a key factor if only a few gliders get round the task. The scores for other pilots are then assigned according to their speed relative around the task of the winner. A small proportion of the maximum score is given for the distance covered so that competitors who do not complete the task, will still get a score. In some competitions handicapping that is based on the performance of the glider is used and so further factors are applied before determining each pilot's score for the day. Preliminary scores are usually available within a short time after the last landing, but there may be protests and penalties. The final scores are usually formally announced at the beginning of the next contest day during the pilot's briefing for the next day's task. Often the winning pilot in the each class is asked to speak about how they won.

== Water ballast ==
It may seem counter-intuitive, but pilots put water ballast into compartments in the wings to make their planes heavier. Modern gliders can take large quantities of water (a Nimbus-3 can hold 272 kg). The objective is to increase the gliding speed, while maintaining the same gliding angle. The downside is that the glider will climb more slowly in thermals. However, in the right conditions, the time lost in climbing more slowly is more than recouped by the increased speed to the next thermal.

The benefits depend on three factors: the aerodynamic performance of the type of glider at various speeds and weights, the strength of the thermals on the day and the width of the thermals on the day. The increased sink rate will have a small percentage effect on the climb rate in strong thermals. The extra weight of ballast requires the pilot to bank more to stay in narrow thermals and this also increases the sink rate.

Competition pilots usually launch with ballast. If the thermals are weaker and/or smaller, it may be better to continue the flight without ballast and so they may dump it soon after the start or part way round the course. However it is possible that conditions may strengthen and so sometimes keeping the ballast throughout the task may be advantageous.

The airframe of a glider is not designed to withstand the stresses of a hard landing while the glider is loaded with water. Consequently, pilots start emptying the ballast tanks shortly before the gliders cross the finish line so they are empty when they land. This results in spectacular images when competition pilots cross the finish line at low altitude. Recent rules changes are making this practice less desirable for safety reasons.

== Racing strategy and tactics ==
Races are won on the basis of speed over the day's course. Time on course is measured from when each pilot leaves the start zone until they finish. Each competitor may elect to start any time after the start opens. To allow all competitors sufficient time to get into a good position to start, competition rules specify that no competitor may start until twenty minutes after the last competitor has launched. The start can be a line, or it can be a cylinder several miles in radius. In both cases there is a specified maximum altitude for the start and competitors typically will attempt to start as close to the maximum start height as possible.

One of the more important decisions of a flight is when to start. This decision is based mostly on each pilot's desire to be on course during the strongest weather conditions of the day. There are also competitive considerations. Often competitors will try to start just after other pilots, using them as "markers" for favorable lift conditions ahead on course. Using this technique, a skilled pilot can make up several minutes on the earlier starters during the early portion of the flight. Pilots who are being followed in this way may use a variety of tactics to shake off pursuers, such as doubling back after a start and starting again. Each pilot may start as many times as he or she chooses – only the last start counts. However, playing an endless game of "start gate roulette" can have disadvantages. Late starters can find themselves still out on course when the soaring weather becomes weak or wholly unsuitable. The best pilots are therefore also good weather forecasters.

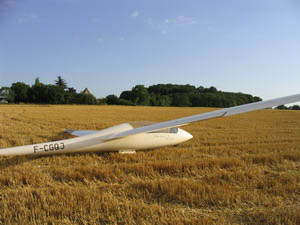
Landing out loses most of the points available on the day

The most important factors influencing the overall speed at which glider can fly around a given course is the average strength of the rising air the pilot chooses for climbing and the directness of the route chosen around the course (no credit is given for deviations, but a detour to reach stronger lift can often more than make up in speed for the extra distance travelled). Experienced pilots typically pass by relatively weak lift, selecting only the strongest lift for climbing. However, being too selective runs the risk of getting too low to the ground and being forced to accept any available sources of rising air (no matter how weak) in order to avoid "landing out". This can cost the competitor valuable time. The best pilots also are expert at getting the most out of each source of lift by maneuvering their glider quickly to the center of the lift where the rate of climb is greatest. They also are highly skilled as using a wide variety of information (weather forecasts, terrain features, clouds, other gliders on course) to estimate what conditions are likely to be like ahead on course and adapt their flying tactics to maximize their overall speed.

It is often possible to fly efficiently by merely slowing down in the rising air while flying straight ahead on course, instead of circling, then speeding up again when the air is no longer rising. This technique is known as 'dolphining'. If the conditions are favorable, the glider can gain enough energy from each source of lift and maintain its overall height for long distances without circling. Days with steady, moderate winds can be good for this, as the thermals often will line up into cloud streets, enabling the pilot to race without having to turn. Choosing a flight path directly on course line may not be the best tactic if a slight diversion can keep the glider in rising air for longer, or at worst keep out of the strongly sinking air.

Throughout the task gliders will often fly together in 'gaggles', because a group of gliders is more likely to find better lift than one glider on its own. Pilots sometimes have to decide whether to stay with a gaggle or go on their own in another direction where they believe there will be better lift. On days when there are no cumulus clouds to indicate where there is lift, gaggle flying is the norm. However gaggle flying makes it more difficult for a pilot to gain significantly more points than the other competitors.

One of the last key decisions that each competitor makes is determining when the glider is high enough to reach the finish line. This is a critical decision because, on the one hand, taking on unnecessary altitude wastes time because there are no points gained for arriving high at the finish. On the other hand, running out of altitude before the finish can result in a costly (and embarrassing) "land-out". For any given lift conditions, there is an optimal final glide speed to minimize the overall time required – the stronger the lift, the faster (and steeper) the final glide should be. Pilots use sophisticated glide computers to calculate the altitude required and to track progress along the way. Most pilots plan their final glide with extra altitude ranging from several hundred to more than a thousand feet as insurance in case unanticipated sinking air is encountered on the final part of the flight.

== Grand Prix ==
In an attempt to widen the appeal of gliding contests, a new format contest, the Grand Prix, has been introduced. Innovations introduced in the Grand Prix format include simultaneous starts for a small number of gliders, tasks consisting of multiple circuits, and simplified scoring.

== Online contests ==
Informal internet competitions are also popular where pilots upload their GPS data files and are automatically scored based on factors such as distance, achieved speed and whether the task flown was declared in advance. In 2009, 13.424 pilots worldwide participated in a contest sponsored by a German aviation magazine, 'Aerokurier', though other countries also operate their own national 'ladders'.

== Aerobatics ==
Aerobatic competitions are held regularly. In this type of competition, the pilots fly a program of maneuvers (such as inverted flight, loop, roll, and various combinations). Each maneuver has a rating called the "K-Factor". Maximum points are given for the maneuver if it is flown perfectly, otherwise points are deducted. Efficient maneuvers also enable the whole program to be completed with the height available. The winner is the pilot with the most points.

== Casualties and incidents ==
- In 2023, two gliders taking part in a competition flight collided when their flight paths unexpectedly crossed in a thermal. In the crash, the tail of one of the gliders was severed, causing the craft descend out of control. The pilot was fatally injured.
- In 2022, a pilot taking part in a gliding competition broke his neck after hitting a tree in a rough landing after taking part in a gliding competition in Shropshire, UK. The pilot was airlifted to hospital but died there 20 days later after contracting pneumonia during spinal surgery.
- In 2017 an Australian pilot was killed when his glider crashed while taking part in the New Zealand's South Island Gliding Championships.
- On July 26, 2014 two gliders made impact with one another at 4,500ft during a competition. One pilot had to make an emergency exit, abandoning his plane using an emergency parachute, where he landed in a field in the path of a combine harvester.
- On September 2, 2007 a glider pilot was killed and his co-pilot seriously injured when they crash landed in high winds during a competition in Banffshire, Scotland.
- In 2007, a German gliding champion died when he crashed his glider during the FAI World GP Gliding Championships in Omarama, New Zealand.
- In 2006, a father and son competing in the South Island Regional Gliding Championships in New Zealand died when their motor glider crashed into a mountain.

== See also ==
- European Gliding Championships
- Glider (sailplane)
- Glider competition classes
- Gliding
- World Gliding Championships
- FAI Gliding Commission
- World Air Games
- Grand Prix gliding
