= Klaus Holighaus =

- Born: July 14, 1940; Eibelshausen
- Died: August 9, 1994 (aged 54); Saint-Gotthard Massif
- Cause of death: Gliding accident (cause unclear)
- Known for: Competition gliding; Glider design and manufacture
- Spouse: Brigitte
- Relatives: Tilo, Ralf (son)
- Aviation career

Racing career
- Best position: 6 times German National Open Class champiom

Klaus Holighaus (14 July 1940 – 9 August 1994) was a glider designer, glider pilot and entrepreneur.

Klaus Holighaus was born in Eibelshausen, Germany. He started his career in gliding when he was an engineering student at the Technische Hochschule Darmstadt, where he was a member of its Akaflieg. Fellow students Gerhard Waibel and Wolf Lemke had already developed the D-36 glider and he contributed to its refinement. He joined Schempp-Hirth as an employee in 1965. He became Chief Executive in 1972 and from 1977 Holighaus was the sole owner of the business. He designed most of the company's products, beginning with the Cirrus until the Nimbus-4.

Holighaus flew in every German National Championship from 1968, winning six times in the Open Class. He became European Champion three times and finished in the top rankings of the nine World Championships in which he competed. He held 16 World Records in various categories.

Holighaus was killed in the area of St. Gotthard when flying in the Alps from Samedan, Switzerland. The wreckage was not discovered for two days. The cause of the accident is not clear, but a possible factor was the deteriorating weather on the day and he may have unsuccessfully tried to cross a mountain pass. He had logged 8,168 hours in gliders.

He married Brigitte. His son, Tilo, continues the Schempp-Hirth business. After his death, a road in Kirchheim unter Teck was named Klaus-Holighaus-Straße.
