= Jonker JS-1 Revelation =

Family of composite gliders built by Jonker Sailplanes

JS-1 Revelation
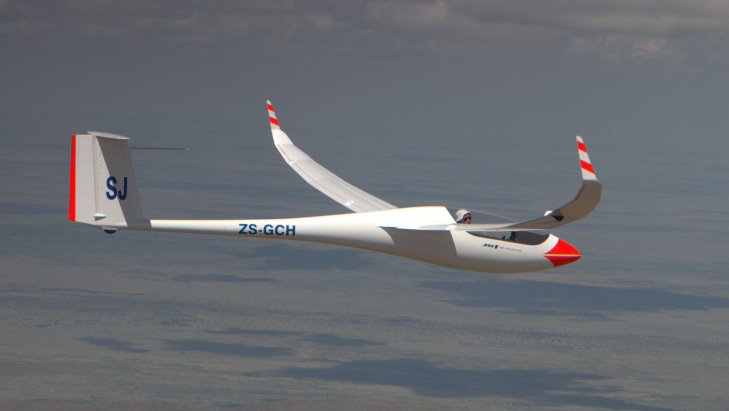

General information
- Type: High performance Sailplane
- National origin: South Africa
- Manufacturer: Jonker Sailplanes
- Number built: 100 (as of 2015)

History
- First flight: 12 December 2006

The Jonker JS-1 Revelation is a glider built of glass-fibre, carbon fibre and Kevlar. It is available with an 18-metre span for the 18 metre class or a 21-metre span for the Open class. The manufacturer is Jonker Sailplanes of Potchefstroom South Africa, founded in 2004 by two brothers, Attie and Uys Jonker. The structural and chief designer is Attie Jonker, while the airfoil and main aerodynamic features were developed by Johan Bosman in co-operation with the Delft University of Technology.

== 18 metre versions ==
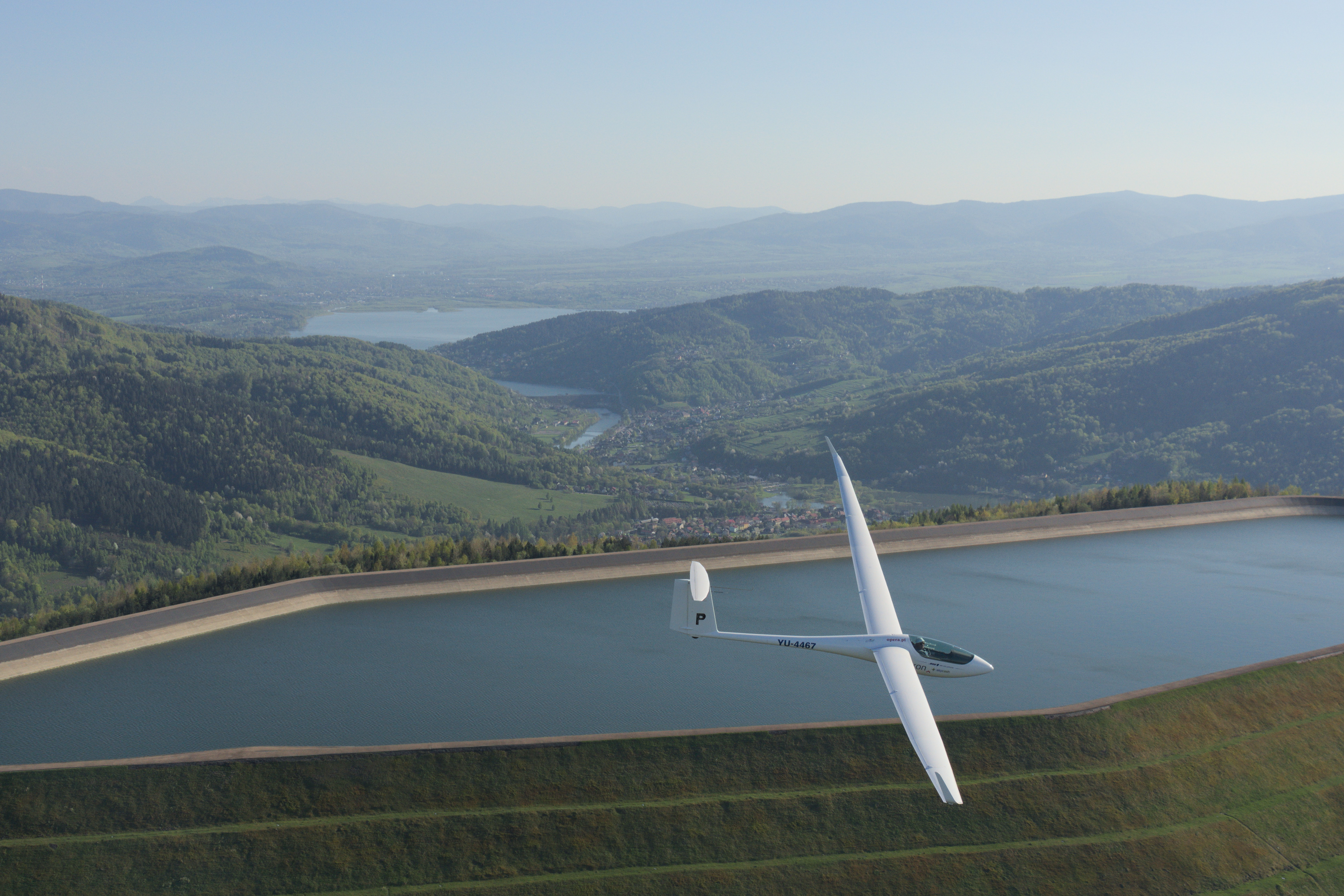
Jonker JS-1 Revelation in flight over Żar mountain

The wing has full-span flaperons, an elliptical planform and uses winglets. It is in 4 pieces, each tip is 1.5 metres. Two novel features are:

- a double-hole blowing/suction system in the wings to minimise drag. The two rows of blow holes on the lower surface prevent turbulent flow at specific locations for different flap settings, thus reducing drag
- a jet engine for the self-sustaining version. A self-launching version was considered but it was decided that the fuselage would require extensive structural modification.

The first flight of the JS-1 was on 12 December 2006. Series production then started and up to July 2012 about 34 had been produced

Attie Jonker won the 18 metre class South African National Championship in 2008 with a JS-1 Revelation.

== 21 metre version ==
A new version, JS1C-21m, with 3 metre wing-tips, which increase the span to 21 metres, has been developed. The first flight was on 22 March 2012. Because of the higher wing loads and increased maximum take-off mass of 720 kg (increased from 600 kg), the wing/wingtip junction has been redesigned including stronger wing spar caps and thicker wing-tip spars. All future JS1 Revelations will be compatible with the optional 21m wing-tips.

The new wing-tips have water tanks each with a capacity of 17 litres of ballast which can be jettisoned separately from the main wing and fin tanks.

Theoretical performance gives a claimed best glide of around 1:60 and, with the maximum wing loading of 58.7 kg/m2 and the polar remaining flat at high cruise speeds, the manufacturers state that it is competitive at the highest level with other Open Class gliders. The results (2nd, 3rd and three other places in the top ten in the 2014 World Gliding Championships Open Class (Note: Note that maximal take off mass of JC-1C's (720kg) was significantly lower than the class limit of 850kg, placing JC-1C's at a theoretical disadvantage)) supports this assertion.

== EASA certification ==
The JS1-C is certificated in Europe by M&D Flugzeugbau as the JS-MD Single, with a retractable MD-TJ42 turbojet engine mounted behind the cockpit.

== Variants ==
JS-1
18 meter wingspan prototypes
JS-1B
18 meter wingspan 18 metre class competition glider, production version.
JS-1C
21 meter wingspan Open class competition glider

== Specifications (JS-1B) ==
General characteristics

- Crew: One
- Length: 7.17 m (23 ft 6 in)
- Wingspan: 18 m (59 ft 1 in)
- Aspect ratio: 28.8
- Airfoil: JS-02-127 T12 with 6 variations along wing
- Empty weight: 280 kg (617 lb)
- Gross weight: 600 kg (1,323 lb)
- Water ballast: 200 kg (441 lb)

Performance

- Maximum speed: 290 km/h (180 mph, 160 kn)
- Stall speed: 75 km/h (47 mph, 40 kn)
- Max rough air speed - 198 km/h (123 mph)
- Rate of sink: 0.50 m/s (100 ft/min)
- Lift-to-drag: 53
- Wing loading: 31.2 kg/m^{2} (6.4 lb/sq ft) - 53.6 kg/m^{2} (10.9 lb/sqft)

== See also ==
Related development

- Jonker JS-3 Rapture

Aircraft of comparable role, configuration, and era

- Schempp-Hirth Ventus-3
- Schleicher ASG 29
- Lange Antares 23E

Related lists

- List of gliders
