= Schleicher AS 33 =

German glider / motor glider, 2020

AS 33
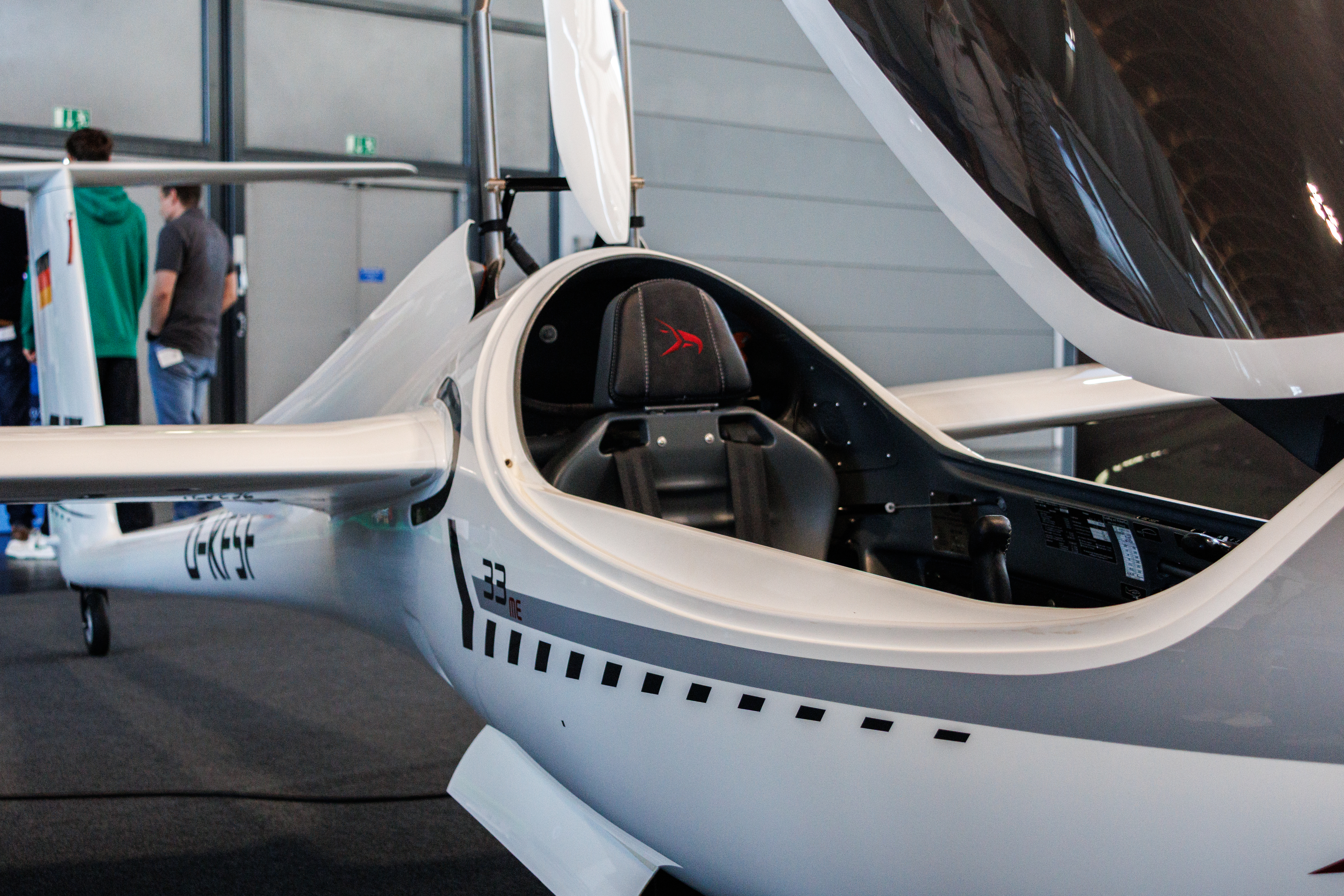

General information
- Type: 15 metre-class and 18 metre-class
- National origin: Germany
- Manufacturer: Schleicher

History
- First flight: 23 January 2020

The Schleicher AS 33 is a German glider manufactured by Alexander Schleicher. The prototype had its maiden flight from Huhnrain Airport, Poppenhausen near Frankfurt on 23 January 2020. The design can be flown in the 18 metre class or in the 15 metre class.

== Design and development ==
The AS 33 is based upon the ASG 29, with a totally new wing with an 18 m (59 ft) span and 10 m^{2} (110 sq ft) area, which optimizes the airflow around the fuselage/wing transition as well as at the wingtips. The AS 33 is a single-seat, mid-wing sailplane of composite construction, with a T-tail. To fly in the FAI 15m class, a second pair of outer wings is available. The separation point for the outer wings is at 5.1m along the span.

The glider has upward extending three-tier air-brakes and independently switchable electrical valves for the water ballast tanks in the inner and outer wings. The main wheel has a disc brake. The main wheel and the tail-wheel are retractable.

Schleicher no longer includes the designer's initial in the glider's designation.

== Variants ==
- AS 33: Pure sailplane, without any engine.
- AS 33 Es: with SOLO 2350 engine with an electric starter
- AS 33 Me: Electric self-launcher

== Specifications (with 18m wings) ==
Data from Manufacturer

General characteristics

- Crew: one
- Wingspan: 18.00 m (59 ft 0 in)
- Wing area: 10 m^{2} (107.6 sq ft)
- Aspect ratio: 32.4
- Empty weight: 300 kg (661 lb)
- Gross weight: 600 kg (1,322 lb)
- Powerplant: 1 × Solo 2350 air-cooled, two-cylinder, two-stroke (E version), 22 kW (30 hp)

== See also ==
Aircraft of comparable role, configuration, and era

- Jonker JS-3 Rapture
- Schempp-Hirth Ventus-3

Related lists

- List of gliders
