= Jonker JS-3 Rapture =

South African glider

JS-3 Rapture
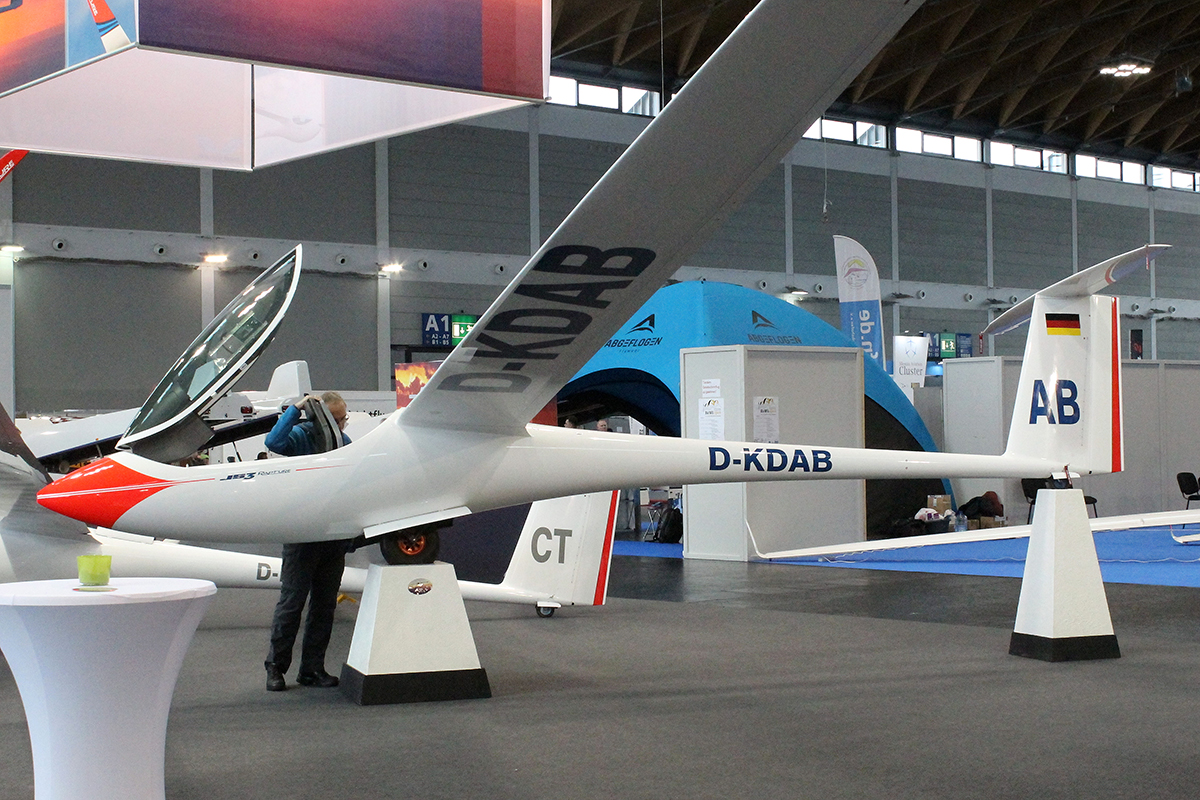

General information
- Type: High performance Sailplane
- National origin: South Africa
- Manufacturer: Jonker Sailplanes
- Number built: 200 as of Oct 2023

History
- First flight: 12 December 2016

The Jonker JS-3 Rapture is a glider built of glass-fibre, carbon fibre and Kevlar. It has full-span flaps and can be operated with a wingspan of either 15 m (49.2 ft) or 18 m (59.1 ft).

The manufacturer is Jonker Sailplanes of Potchefstroom South Africa, founded in 2004 by two brothers, Attie and Uys Jonker. The structural and chief designer is Attie Jonker, while the airfoil and main aerodynamic features were developed by Johan Bosman in co-operation with the Delft University of Technology.

The first flight of the JS-3 was on 12 December 2016.

== Design and development ==
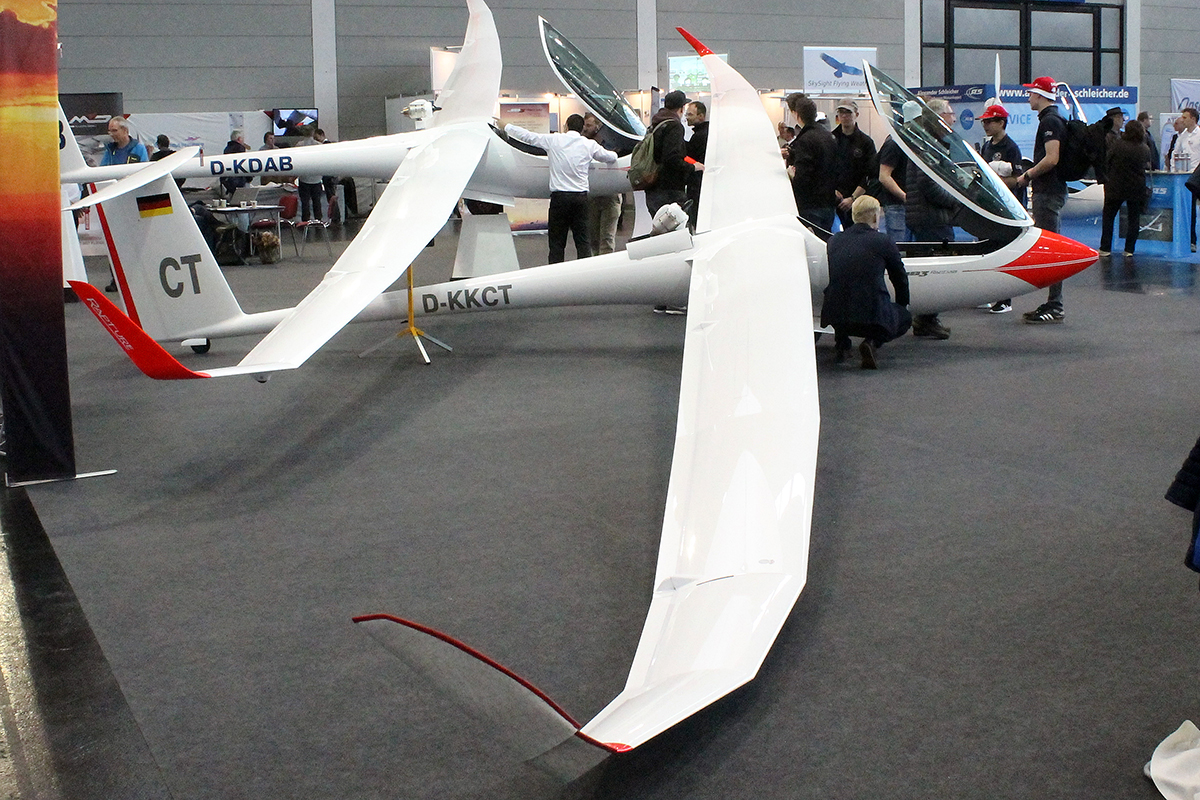
JS-3 Rapture

Type certification of the JS-MD 3 was achieved with EASA on 18 July 2019.

The JS3 is equipped with Tost nose and centre of gravity release hooks, retractable main undercarriage leg with elastomeric shock absorbers, and a fixed pneumatic 180 mm (7.09 in) tail wheel with an aluminium hub. A retractable 150 mm (5.91 in) tail wheel can be fitted in place of the fixed tailwheel. Provision is made to fit two 12V LiFePo 7Ah/10Ah main batteries with a fuse box in the luggage compartment's recessed battery boxes, accessible from cockpit. A goose-neck microphone is optional, as are two independent speakers for radio, with the antenna in the rudder and a navigation computer in the instrument panel. The prototype flew in the 2017 World Gliding Championships

== Variants ==
JS-3 Rapture 15m
Version with 15 m (49 ft) wings
JS-3 Rapture 18m
Version with 18 m (59 ft) wings

== Specifications (JS3 - RAPTURE 18m) ==
Data from JS 3 Rapture 18m – Jonker Sailplanes

General characteristics

- Crew: one
- Length: 6.86 m (22 ft 6 in)
- Wingspan: 18 m (59 ft 1 in)
- Height: 1.22 m (4 ft 0 in)
- Aspect ratio: 32.8
- Empty weight: 280 kg (617 lb) without engine, 297 kg (655 lb) with engine
- Gross weight: 600 kg (1,323 lb)
- Max takeoff weight: 430 kg (948 lb) without water ballast

Performance

- Maximum glide ratio: 55:1 at 120 km/h (75 mph; 65 kn) at MAUW
- Best glide speed at 450 kg (992 lb): 105 km/h (65 mph; 57 kn)
- Rate of sink: 0.49 m/s (96 ft/min) 1.43 m/s (5 ft/s) at 200 km/h (120 mph; 110 kn) at MAUW
- Wing loading: 37.0 kg/m^{2} (7.6 lb/sq ft) minimum, 60.36 kg/m^{2} (12 lb/sq ft) maximum

== See also ==
Related development

- Jonker JS-1 Revelation

Aircraft of comparable role, configuration, and era

- Schempp-Hirth Ventus 3
- Schleicher AS 33

Related lists

- List of gliders
