= M&D Flugzeugbau =

German aircraft manufacturing company

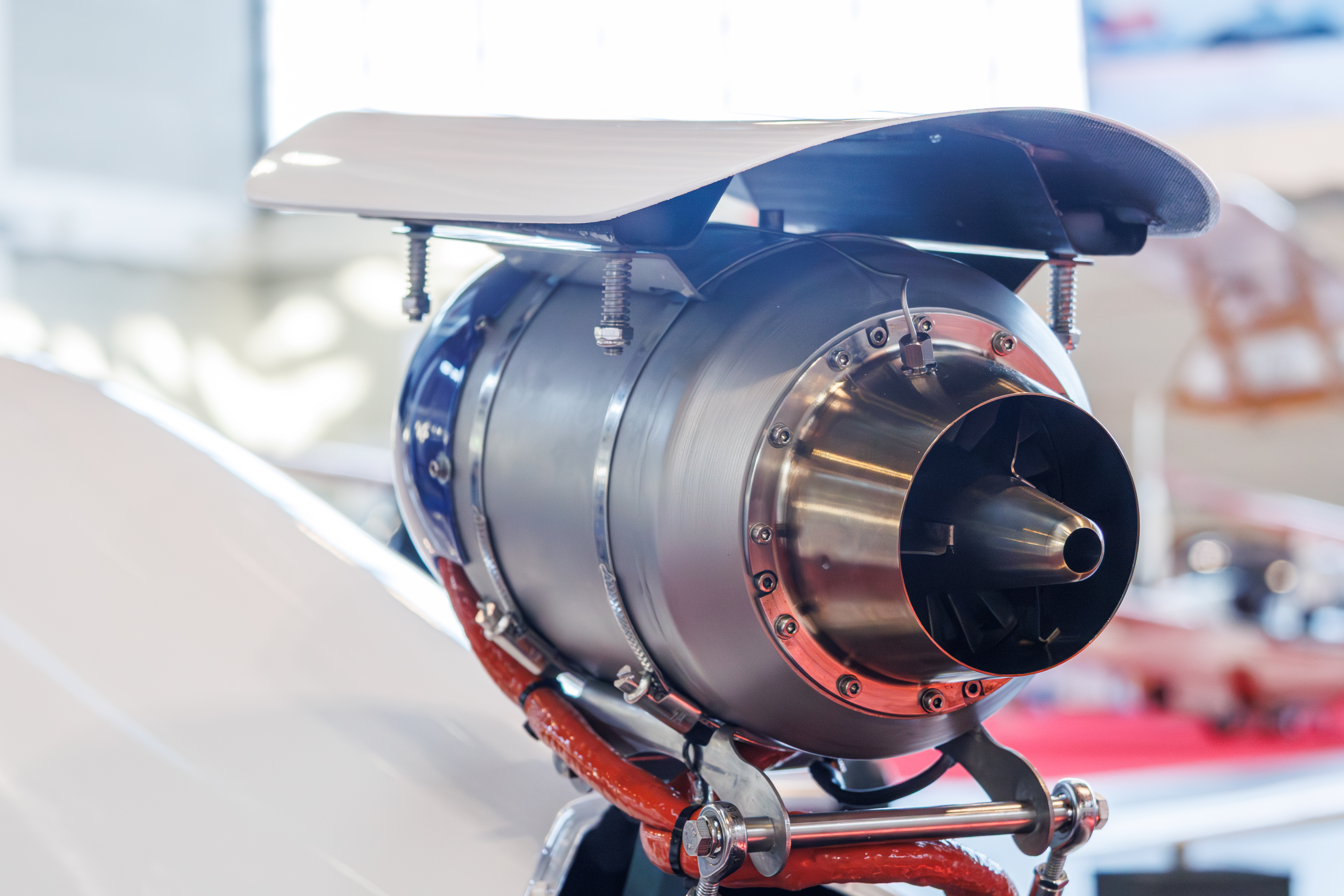
MD-TJ42 jet engine at AERO Friedrichshafen

M&D Flugzeugbau is an aircraft manufacturing company based in Friedeburg, Germany. it manufactures the Samburo motor-glider and provides a range of maintenance services for other aircraft made of composite materials such as Jonker Sailplanes and the MD-TJ42 jet engine.
