= M&D Flugzeugbau Samburo =

AVo 68 Samburo
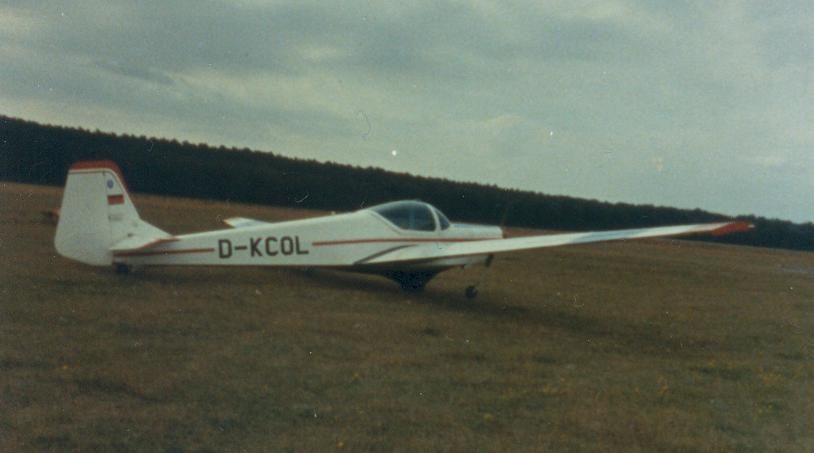

General information
- Type: Motor glider
- Manufacturer: Alpla, M&D Flugzeugbau
- Number built: 16 by end of 1977

History
- First flight: 1977

The M&D Flugzeugbau AVo 68 Samburo is a two-seat motor glider, first designed and manufactured in Austria.

== Design and development ==
The aircraft is of typical motorglider configuration, with a tractor propeller and long, tapering wings. As originally designed, it also had a sailplane-like undercarriage consisting of a single mainwheel and a steerable tailwheel; however, later versions have a fixed taildragger undercarriage with two spatted mainwheels. The pilot and passenger sit side by side. With numerous design changes - including modern Rotax engines, state-of-the-art avionics, and aerotow capabilities, it is still in production by the M&D Flugzeugbau company in Germany.

== Variants ==
AVo 60 Samburo
The initial prototype powered by a 60 PS (44 kW) Limbach engine.
AVo 68 Samburo
Production aircraft powered by 68 PS (50 kW) Limbach engines.

== Specifications (AVo 68-R 115) ==
General characteristics

- Crew: one pilot
- Capacity: one passenger
- Length: 8.05 m (26 ft 5 in)
- Wingspan: 16.68 m (54 ft 9 in)
- Height: 1.86 m (6 ft 1 in)
- Wing area: 20.7 m^{2} (223 sq ft)
- Aspect ratio: 13.6:1
- Empty weight: 550 kg (1,212 lb)
- Gross weight: 750 kg (1,543 lb)
- Powerplant: 1 × Rotax 914F piston engine , 85 kW (115 hp)

Performance

- Maximum speed: 215 km/h (134 mph, 116 kn)
- Range: 1,000 km (623 mi, 541 nmi)
- Maximum glide ratio: 25:1
- Rate of climb: 6.0 m/s (1,180 ft/min)
- Rate of sink: 1.15 m/s (226 ft/min)
