= Jonker Sailplanes =

South African glider manufacturer

Jonker Sailplanes is a glider manufacturer based in Potchefstroom, South Africa.

== History ==
Uys Jonker and his brother, Attie Jonker founded Jonker Sailplanes in 2004.

== Products ==
The following aircraft are in production or under development

- Jonker JS-1 Revelation 18m/21m flapped sailplane with jet sustainer - 2006
- Jonker JS-2 Revenant 18m/21m flapped self-launcher
- Jonker JS-3 Rapture 15m/18m flapped with jet sustainer or electric propulsion
- Jonker JS-4 Rengeti 15m/18m standard class sailplane with jet sustainer or electric propulsion
- Jonker JS-5 Rey Open class sailplane with jet sustainer or self-launcher
