= Schempp-Hirth Ventus-3 =

German single-seat glider, 2016

Ventus-3
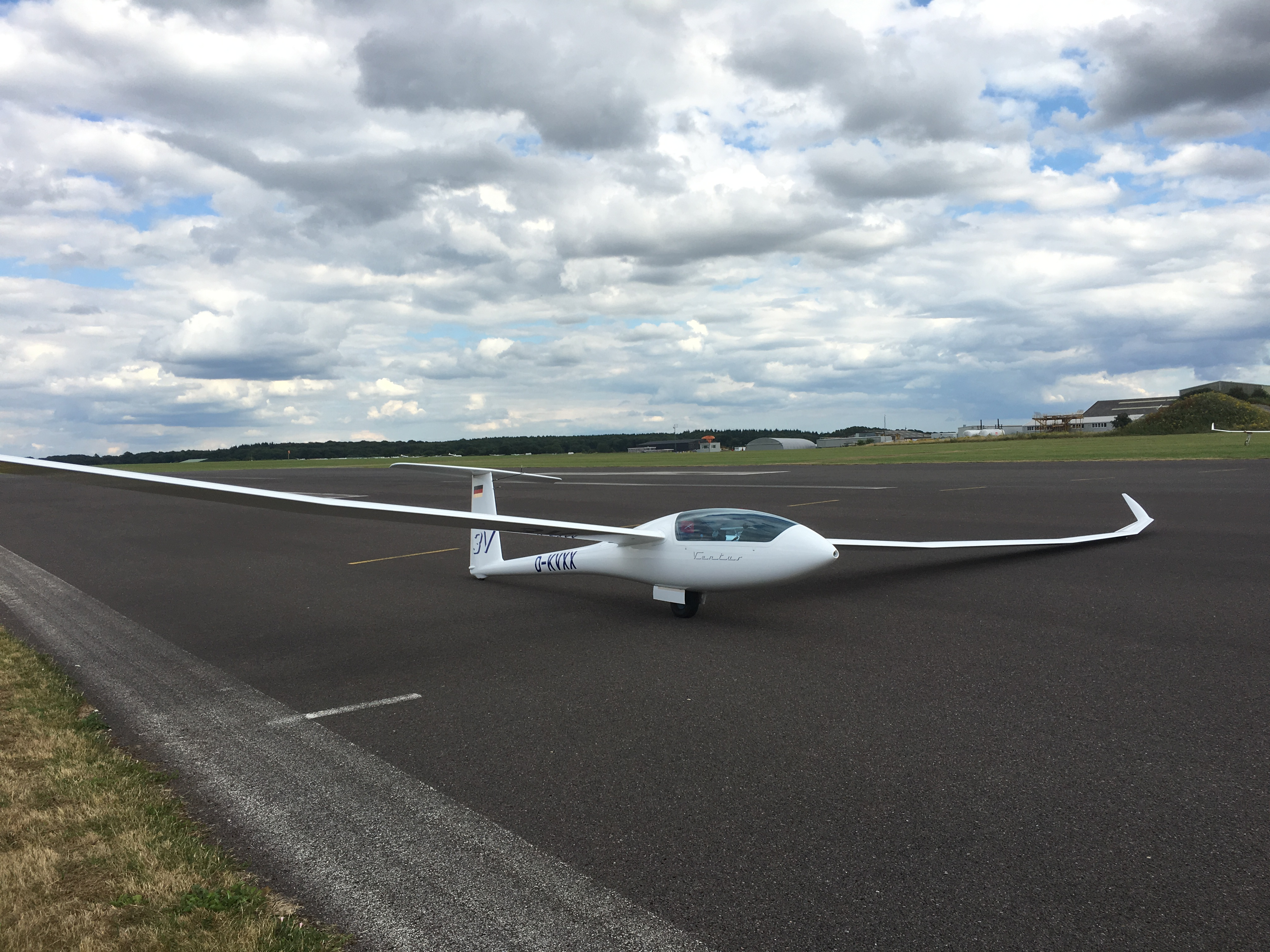
- Schempp-Hirth Ventus 3T glider at Lasham Airfield

General information
- Type: 18 metre-class sailplane
- National origin: Germany
- Manufacturer: Schempp-Hirth
- Number built: 250 as of July 2025

History
- First flight: 2016

The Schempp-Hirth Ventus-3 is a sailplane produced by Schempp-Hirth. It replaces the highly successful Schempp-Hirth Ventus-2.

== Design and development ==
It was announced at the AERO Friedrichshafen in April 2015 where a mock-up was suspended from the ceiling of the exhibition hall. The prototype flew on 29 January 2016 at Flugplatz Hahnweide at Kirchheim unter Teck in Germany. Production of the first seven turbo Ventus 3T started on 28 April 2016. These competed in the 2017 World Gliding Championships and the 2017 European Gliding Championships. In the latter competition, pilots with Ventus 3T took the first three places in the 18m Class. A Ventus 3T also took first place at the World Championships at Hosín in 2018.

Two sizes of fuselage are now available, Sport and Performance; the latter is larger. The Sport fuselage is available as a pure glider, or with a turbo sustaining engine, or a front-end electric sustaining (FES) engine. Currently the larger fuselage is only available for the self-launching 'M' and the turbo versions.

The first version of the Sport fuselage with the front electric sustainer engine, Ventus 3F, first flew December 2017. The first version with the Performance fuselage, Ventus 3M, also flew in December 2017.

There is also an electric self-launching version: Ventus E|using either the Performance and Sport fuselages. The retractable Solo engine and pylon delivers 39 kW (53 hp) peak power at 2900 rpm. Power is supplied by two EMECTRIC 400-volt batteries in the fuselage and are therefore easily accessible. Motor and batteries add 77Kg to the total mass of the glider.

Features include 'bug-wiper' garages recessed in the fuselage. There are three ballast tanks in each wing (total capacity 178 litres) and an optional 7.8 litre tank in the fin. The outer two tanks are filled from the wing-tip. 15m tips are available.

It has been designed to carry more ballast than the Ventus 2 and so its gross weight is 75 kg greater than its predecessor. Its maximum gross weight is now the same to the ASG-29.

== Specifications (Ventus-3 Sport or Performance Edition with 18m wings) ==
General characteristics

- Crew: One
- Length: 6.63 m (21 ft 9 in) (Sport)
- Wingspan: 18.00 m (59 ft 0.7 in)
- Wing area: 10.84 m^{2} (116.68 sq ft)
- Aspect ratio: 29.9
- Empty weight: 300 kg (661 lb)
- Gross weight: 600 kg (1,323 lb)

Performance

- Maximum speed: 280 km/h (174 mph, 151 kn)

Either the turbo engine or the FES engine adds 50 kg to the empty weight given above

== See also ==
Aircraft of comparable role, configuration, and era

- Jonker JS-3 Rapture
- Schleicher AS 33

Related lists

- List of gliders
