= Glider (sailplane) =

Type of aircraft used in the sport of gliding

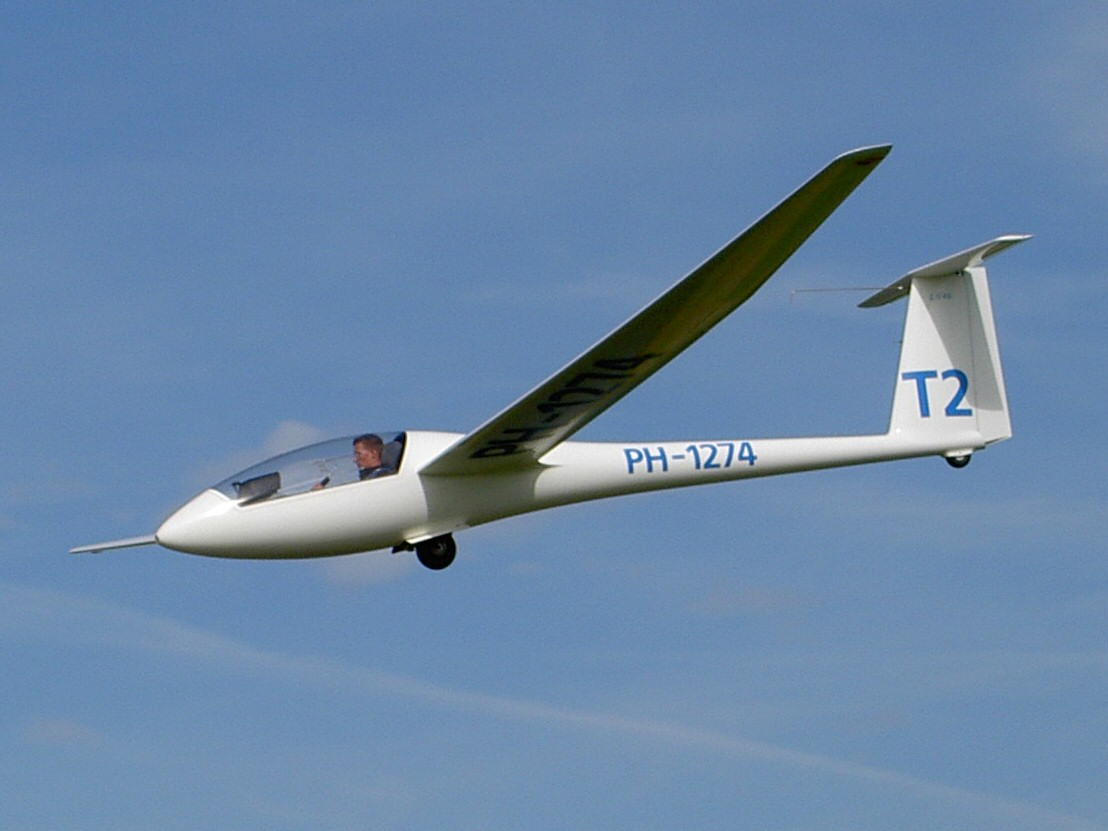
Rolladen-Schneider LS4

(video) A glider sails over Gunma, Japan.

A glider or sailplane is a type of glider aircraft used in the leisure activity and sport of gliding (also called soaring). This unpowered aircraft can use naturally occurring currents of rising air in the atmosphere to gain altitude. Sailplanes are aerodynamically streamlined, so they can fly a significant distance forward for a small decrease in altitude.

In North America, the term 'sailplane' is also used to describe this type of aircraft. In other parts of the English-speaking world, the word 'glider' is more common.

== Types ==
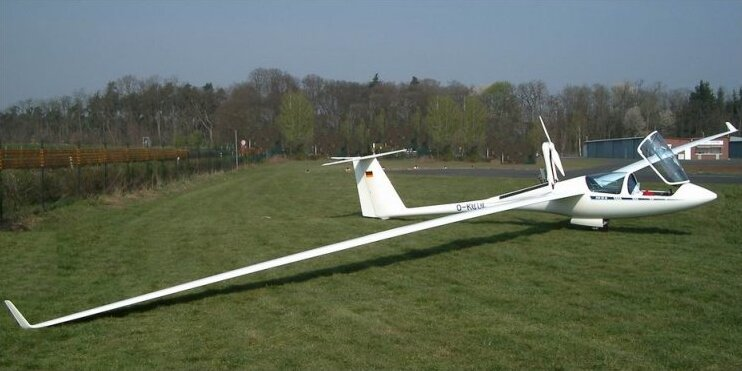
ASH25M—a self-launching two-seater glider

Gliders benefit from producing very low drag for any given amount of lift. This factor is best achieved with long, thin wings, a slender fuselage, and smooth surfaces with an absence of protuberances. Aircraft with these features are able to soar, meaning they may climb efficiently in rising air produced by thermals or hills. In still air, sailplanes can glide long distances at high speed with a minimum loss of height in between.

Sailplanes have rigid wings and either skids or undercarriage. In contrast, hang gliders and paragliders use the pilot's feet for the start of the launch and for the landing. These latter types are described in separate articles, though their differences from sailplanes are covered below. Sailplanes are usually launched by winch or aerotow, though other methods, such as auto tow and bungee, are occasionally used.

These days, almost all gliders are sailplanes, but in the past, many gliders were not. These types did not soar. Instead, they were simply engineless aircraft towed by another aircraft to a desired destination and then cast off for landing. The prime example of a non-soaring glider was the military glider (such as those used in the Second World War). They were often used just once, then usually abandoned after landing, having served their purpose.

Motor gliders are gliders with engines that can be used for extending a flight and even, in some cases, for take-off. Some high-performance motor gliders (known as "self-sustaining" gliders) may have an engine-driven retractable propeller, which can be used to sustain flight. Other motor gliders have enough thrust to launch themselves before the propeller is retracted and are known as "self-launching" gliders. Another type is the self-launching "touring motor glider", where the pilot can switch the engine on and off in flight without retracting the propeller.

== History ==
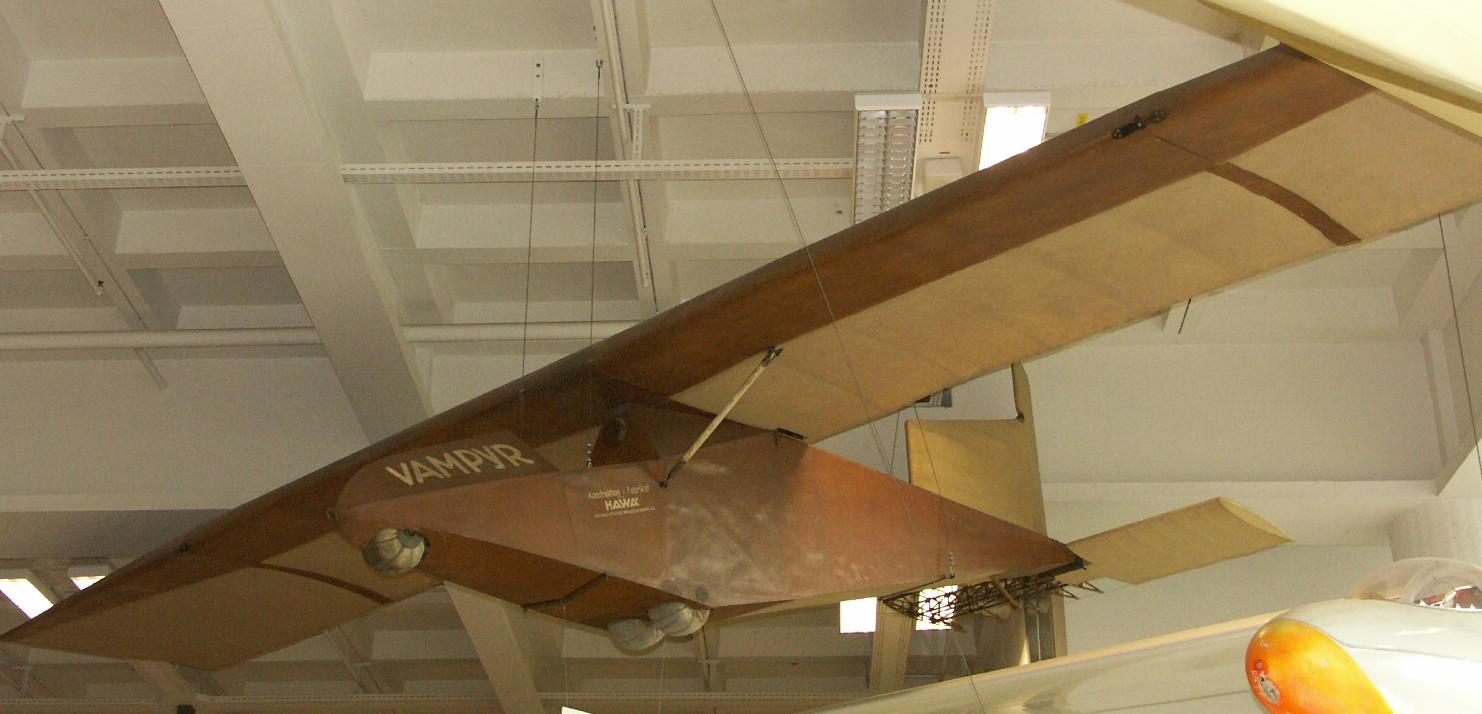
Hannover H 1 Vampyr, 1921

Sir George Cayley's gliders achieved brief wing-borne hops from around 1849. In the 1890s, Otto Lilienthal built gliders using weight shift for control. In the early 1900s, the Wright Brothers built gliders using movable surfaces for control. In 1903, they successfully added an engine.

After World War I, gliders were built for sporting purposes in Germany. Germany's strong links to gliding were in large part due to post-World War I regulations, where Germany was not permitted to construct or fly motorized planes. Accordingly, the country's aircraft enthusiasts often turned to gliders. Many of these enthusiasts were actively encouraged by the German government, particularly at flying sites suited to gliding flight like the Wasserkuppe.

The sporting use of gliders rapidly evolved in the 1930s; it is now their main application. As their performance improved, gliders began to be used for cross-country flying. They now regularly fly hundreds or even thousands of kilometres in a day when the weather is suitable.

== Design ==
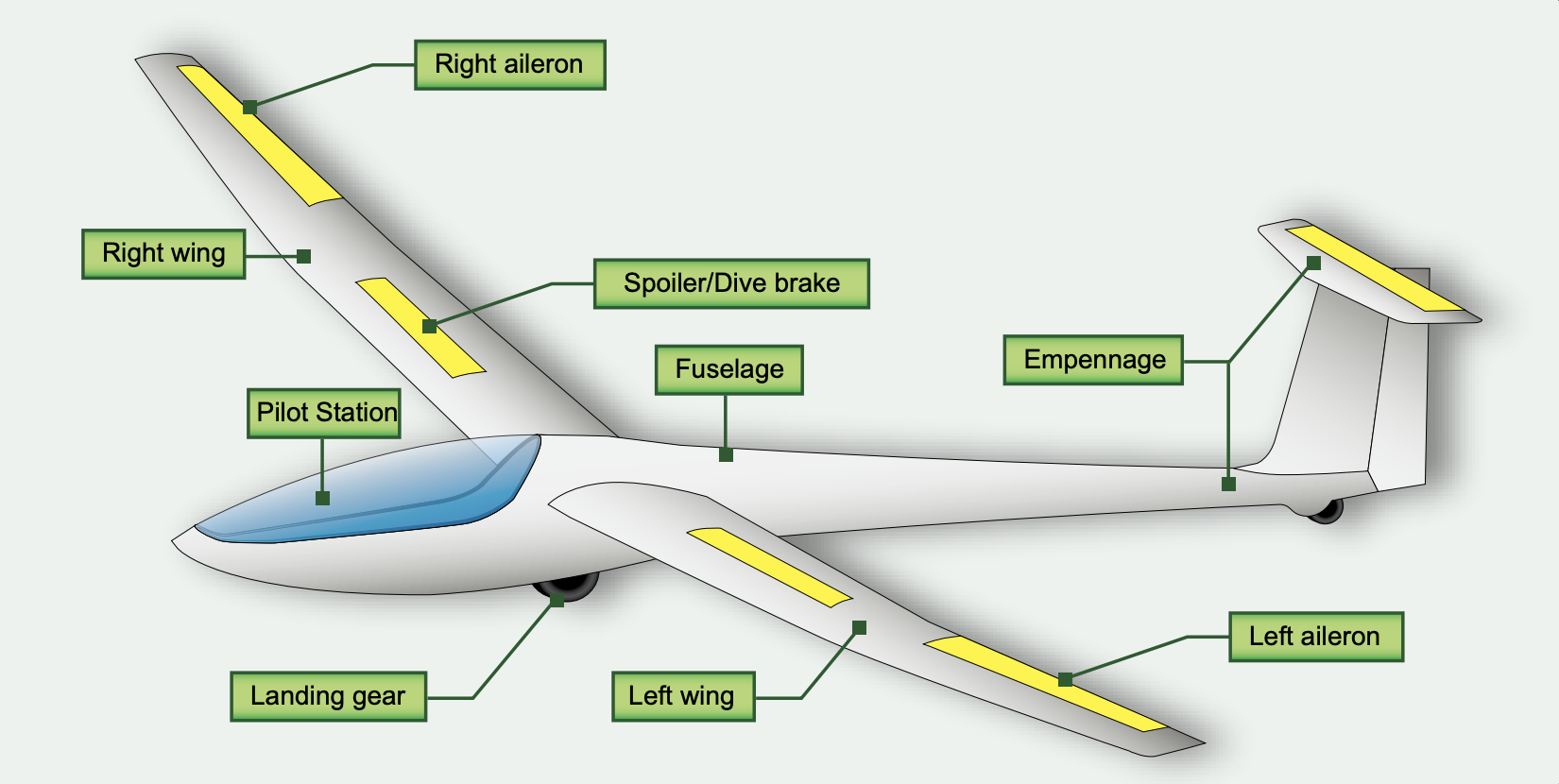
Components of a glider aircraft

Glider airframes include a fuselage, wings, and empennage section. Self-launching gliders also include built-in engines.

Early gliders had no cockpit; the pilot sat on a small seat located just ahead of the wing. These were known as "primary gliders," and they were usually launched from the tops of hills, though they are also capable of short hops across the ground while being towed behind a vehicle. To enable gliders to soar more effectively than primary gliders, the designs minimized drag. Gliders now have very smooth, narrow fuselages and very long, narrow wings with a high aspect ratio and winglets.

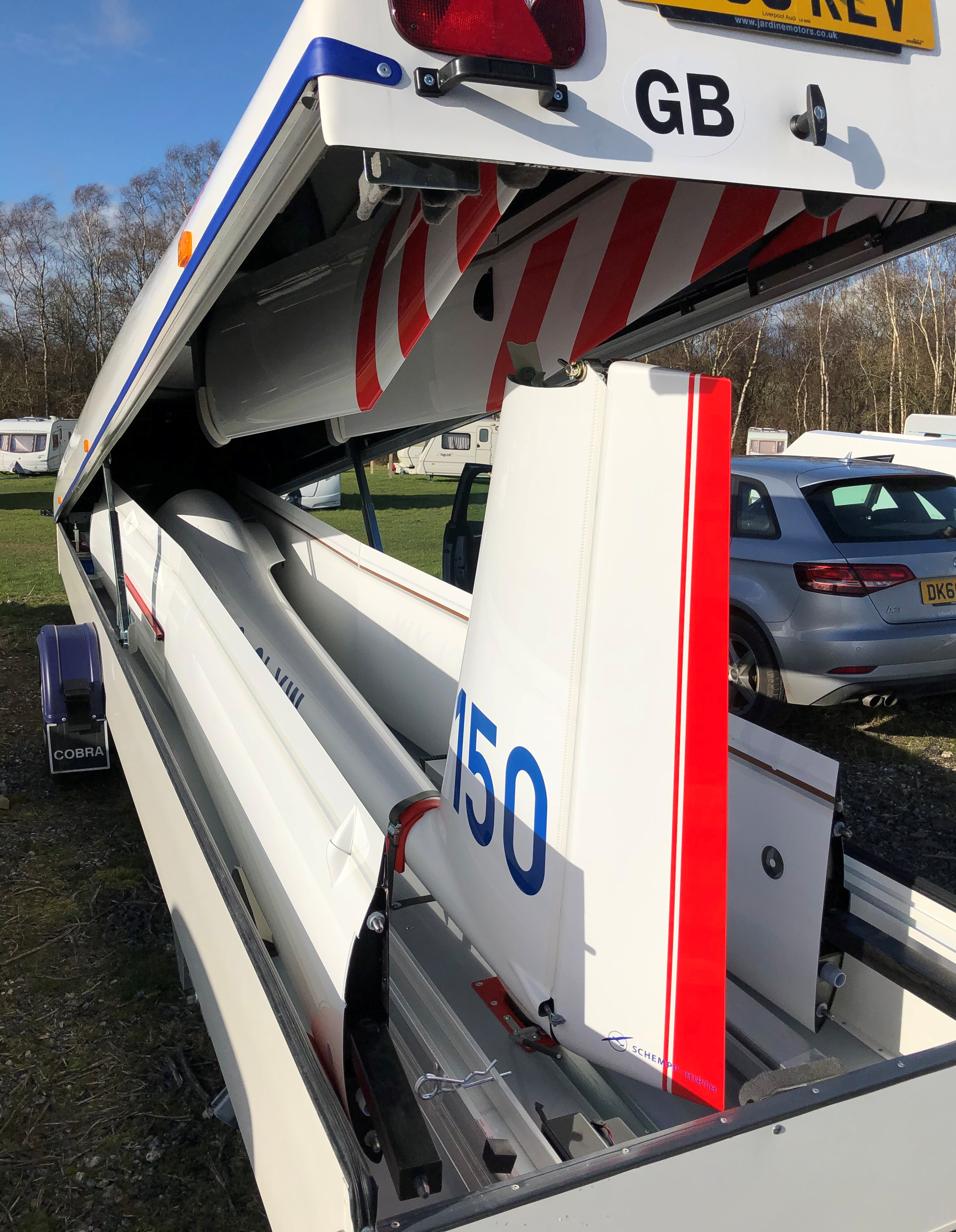
De-rigged glider in its trailer for storage and road transport

The early gliders were made mainly of wood with metal fastenings, stays, and control cables. Later fuselages made of fabric-covered steel tubes were married to wood and fabric wings for lightness and strength. New materials such as carbon fiber, fiberglass, and Kevlar have since been used with computer-aided design to increase performance. The first glider to use glass fiber extensively was the Akaflieg Stuttgart FS-24 Phönix, which first flew in 1957. This material is still used because of its high strength-to-weight ratio and its ability to give a smooth exterior finish to reduce drag. Drag has also been minimized by more aerodynamic shapes and retractable undercarriages. Flaps are fitted to the trailing edges of the wings on some gliders to optimise lift and drag at a wide range of speeds.

With each generation of materials and with the improvements in aerodynamics, the performance of gliders has increased. One measure of performance is the glide ratio. A ratio of 30:1 means that in smooth air a glider can travel forward 30 meters while losing only 1 meter of altitude. Comparing some typical gliders that might be found in the fleet of a gliding club – the Grunau Baby from the 1930s had a glide ratio of just 17:1, the glass-fiber Libelle of the 1960s increased that to 36:1, and modern flapped 18-meter gliders such as the ASG29 have a glide ratio of over 50:1. The largest open-class glider, the Eta, has a span of 30.9 meters and has a glide ratio over 70:1. Compare this to the Gimli Glider, a Boeing 767 that ran out of fuel mid-flight and was found to have a glide ratio of 12:1, or to the Space Shuttle with a glide ratio of 4.5:1.

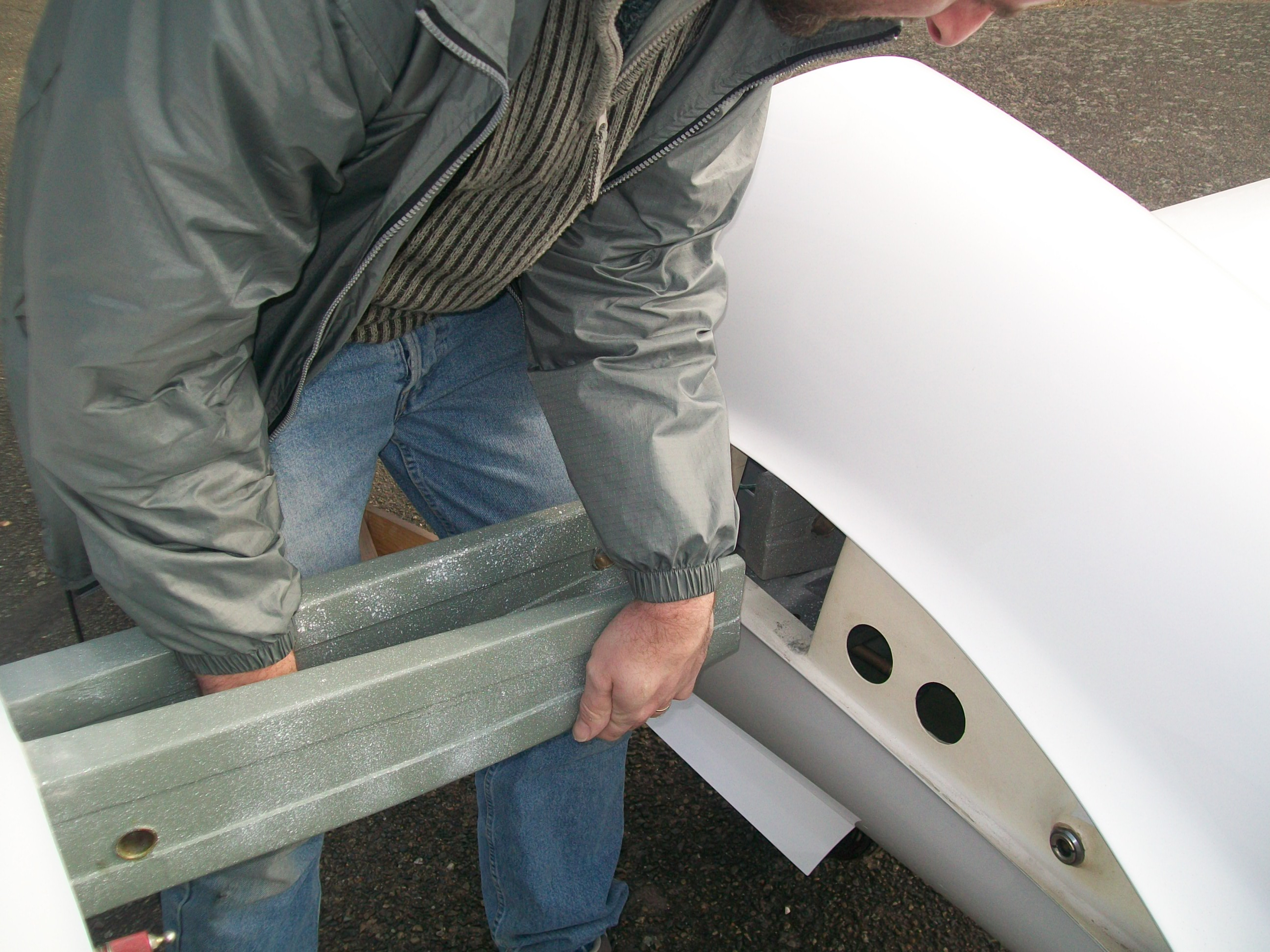
Left wing spar being inserted during rigging

High aerodynamic efficiency is essential to achieve a good gliding performance, so gliders often have aerodynamic features seldom found in other aircraft. The wings of a modern racing glider are designed by computers to create a low-drag laminar flow airfoil. After the wings' surfaces have been shaped by a mould to great accuracy, they are then highly polished. Vertical winglets at the ends of the wings decrease drag, improving wing efficiency. Special aerodynamic seals are used at the ailerons, rudder, and elevator to prevent the flow of air through control surface gaps. Turbulator devices in the form of a zig-zag tape or multiple blow holes positioned in a span-wise line along the wing are used to trip laminar flow air into turbulent flow at a desired location on the wing. This flow control prevents the formation of laminar flow bubbles and ensures the absolute minimum drag. Bug wipers may be installed to wipe the wings while in flight and remove insects that are disturbing the smooth flow of air over the wing.

Modern competition gliders carry jettisonable water ballast (in the wings and sometimes in the vertical stabilizer). The extra weight provided by the water ballast is advantageous if the lift is likely to be strong; it may also be used to adjust the glider's center of mass. Moving the center of mass toward the rear by carrying water in the vertical stabilizer reduces the required downforce from the horizontal stabilizer and the resultant drag from that downforce. Although heavier gliders have a slight disadvantage when climbing in rising air, they achieve a higher speed at any given glide angle. This is an advantage in strong conditions when the gliders spend only a small amount of time climbing in thermals. The pilot can jettison the water ballast before it becomes a disadvantage in weaker thermal conditions. Another use of water ballast is to dampen air turbulence such as might be encountered during ridge soaring. To avoid undue stress on the airframe, gliders must jettison any water ballast before landing.

Most gliders are built in Europe and are designed to EASA Certification Specification CS-22 (previously Joint Aviation Requirements-22). These define minimum standards for safety in a wide range of characteristics, such as controllability and strength. For example, gliders must have design features to minimize the possibility of incorrect assembly (gliders are often stowed in a disassembled configuration, with at least the wings being detached). Automatic connection of the controls during rigging is the common method of achieving this.

== Launch and flight ==
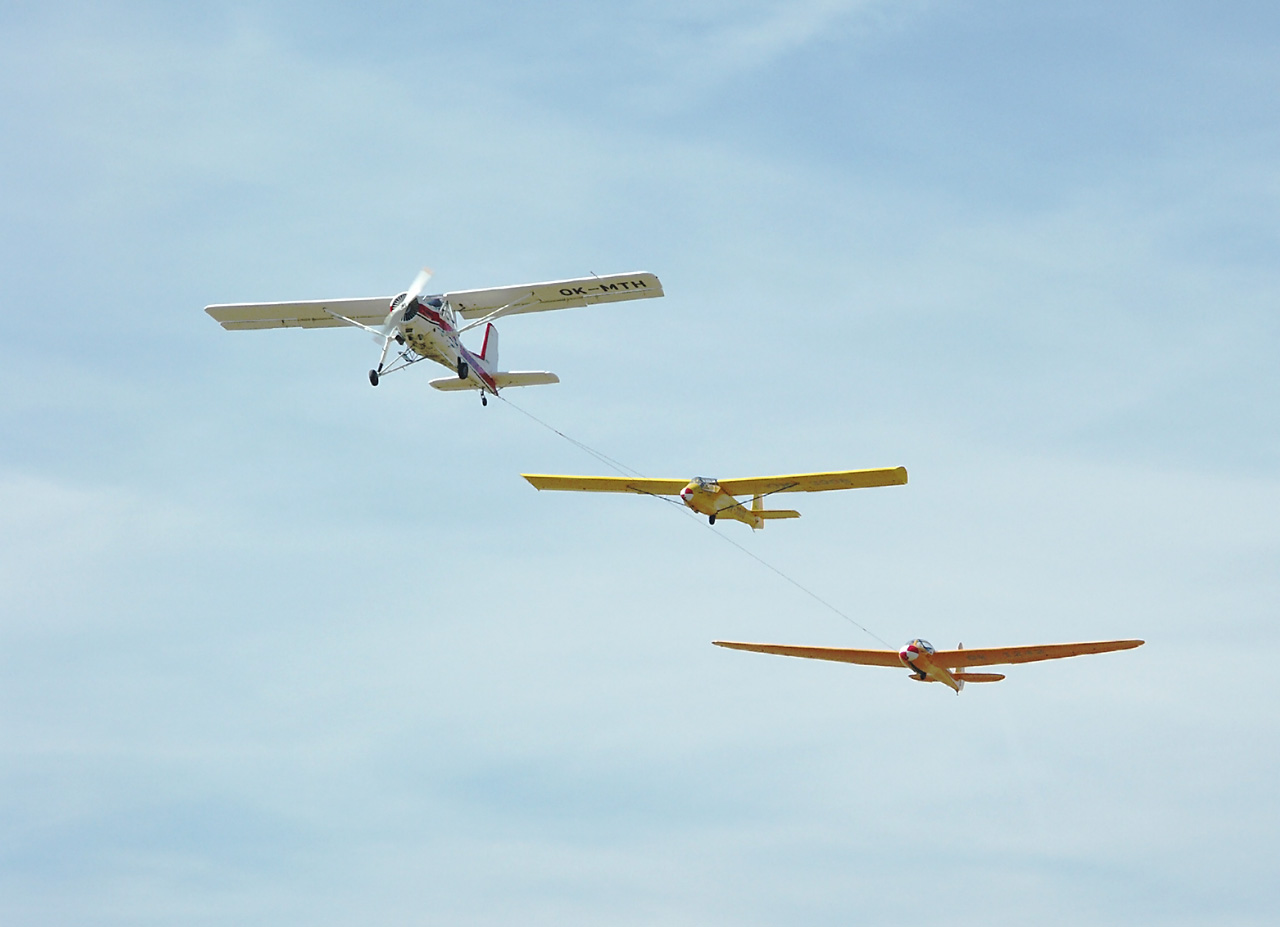
Double aerotow

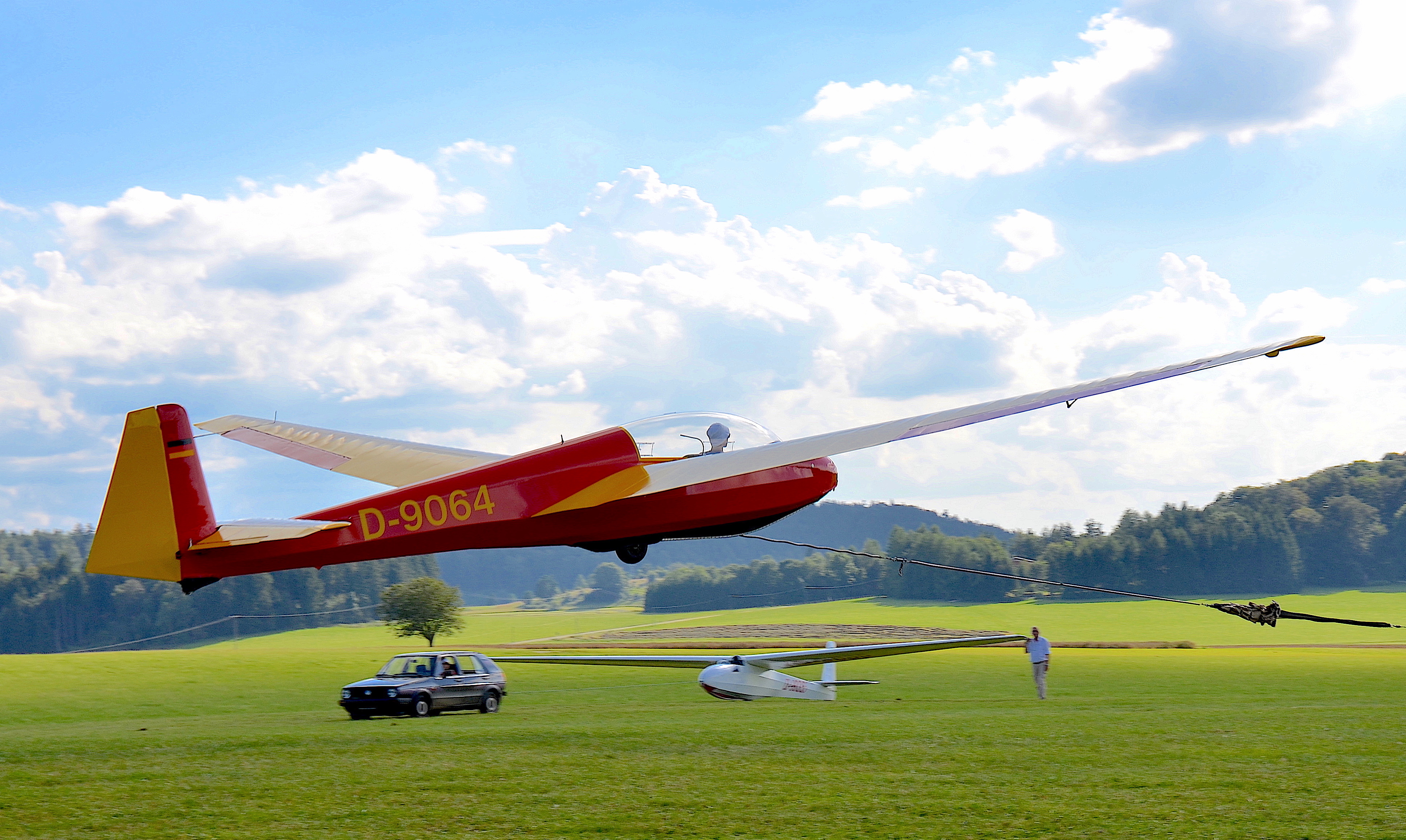
Winch-launch of glider ASK 13

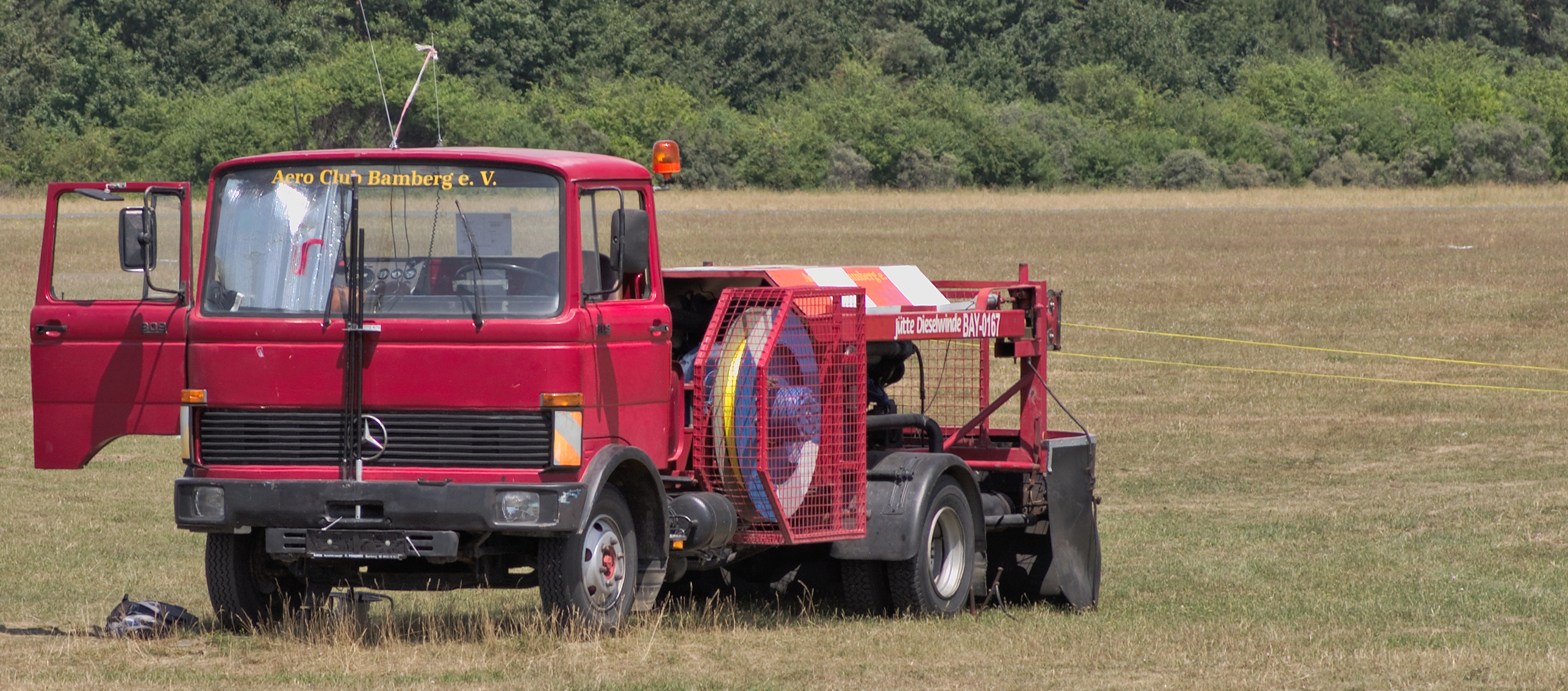
Glider winch

The two most common methods of launching sailplanes are by aerotow and by winch. When aerotowed, the sailplane is towed behind a powered aircraft using a rope about 60 metres (200 ft) long. The sailplane pilot releases the rope after reaching the desired altitude. However, the rope can be released by the towplane also in case of emergency. Winch launching uses a powerful stationary engine located on the ground at the far end of the launch area. The sailplane is attached to one end of 800 to 1,200 metres (2,600 to 3,900 ft) of cable, and the winch rapidly winds it in. The sailplane can gain about 270 to 910 metres (900 to 3,000 ft) of height with a winch launch, depending on the headwind. Less often, automobiles are used to pull sailplanes into the air, either by pulling them directly or through the use of a reverse pulley in a similar manner to the winch launch. Elastic ropes (known as bungees) are occasionally used at some sites to launch gliders from slopes if there is sufficient wind blowing up the hill. Bungee launching was the predominant method of launching early gliders. Some modern gliders can self-launch by using retractable engines or just retractable propellers (see motor glider). These engines can use internal combustion or battery power.

Once launched, gliders try to gain height using thermals, ridge lift, lee waves or convergence zones and can remain airborne for hours. This is known as "soaring". By finding lift sufficiently often, experienced pilots fly cross-country, often on pre-declared tasks of hundreds of kilometers, usually back to the original launch site. Cross-country flying and aerobatics are the two forms of competitive gliding. For information about the forces in gliding flight, see lift-to-drag ratio.

== Glide slope control ==
Pilots need some form of control over the glide slope to land the glider. In powered aircraft, this is done by reducing engine thrust. In gliders the drag of the glider must be increased. Parasitic drag can be increased by use of airbrakes. On the other hand, lift-induced drag can be increased by use of spoilers. These reduce lift generated near the spoilers; they also cause the pilot to increase the angle of attack so the rest of the wing generates more lift to compensate. Glide slope is the distance traveled for each unit of height lost. In a steady wings-level glide with no wind, glide slope is the same as the lift/drag ratio (L/D) of the glider, called "L-over-D". Increasing drag will reduce the L/D, allowing the glider to descend at a steeper angle with no increase in airspeed. Simply pointing the nose downwards only converts altitude into a higher airspeed with a minimal initial reduction in total energy. Gliders, because of their long low wings, create a high ground effect, which can significantly increase the glide angle and make it difficult to bring the glider to Earth in a short distance.

Sideslipping
A slip is performed by crossing the controls (rudder to right with ailerons to left, for example) so that the glider is no longer flying aligned with the airflow. This will present one side of the fuselage to the airflow significantly increasing drag. Early gliders primarily used slipping for glide slope control.
Spoilers
Spoilers are movable control surfaces in the top of the wing, usually located mid-chord or near the spar. They are raised into the airflow to eliminate (spoil) the lift from the wing area behind the spoiler, disrupting the spanwise distribution of lift and increasing lift-induced drag. Spoilers significantly increase drag.
Air brakes
Air brakes, also known as dive brakes, are devices whose primary purpose is to increase drag. On gliders, the spoilers act as air brakes. They are positioned on top of and below the wing. When slightly opened, the upper brakes will spoil the lift, but when fully opened, they will present a large surface, such that they can provide significant drag. Some gliders have terminal velocity dive brakes, which provide enough drag to keep the speed below the maximum permitted speed, even if the glider were pointing straight down. This capability is considered a safer way to descend without instruments through clouds than the only alternative, which is an intentional spin.
Flaps
Flaps are movable surfaces on the trailing edge of the wing, inboard of the ailerons. The primary purpose of flaps is to increase the camber of the wing, so they increase the maximum lift coefficient while reducing the stall speed. Another feature that some flapped gliders possess is negative flaps, which can deflect the trailing edge upward a small amount. This feature is included on some competition gliders to reduce the pitching moment acting on the wing, reducing the downward force that must be provided by the horizontal stabiliser; this reduces the induced drag acting on the stabilizer. On some types the flaps and ailerons are linked, known as 'flaperons'. Simultaneous movement of these allows a greater rate of roll.
Parachute
Some high-performance gliders from the 1960s and 1970s were designed to carry a small drogue parachute because their air brakes were not particularly effective. This was stored in the tail cone of the glider during flight. When deployed, a parachute causes a large increase in drag; however, it has a significant disadvantage over the other methods of controlling the glide slope. This is because a parachute does not allow the pilot to finely adjust the glide slope. Consequently, a pilot may have to jettison the parachute entirely if the glider is not going to reach the desired landing area.

== Landing ==
Early glider designs used skids for landing, but modern types generally land on wheels. Some of the earliest gliders used a dolly with wheels for taking off, and the dolly was jettisoned as the glider left the ground, leaving just the skid for landing. A glider may be designed so the center of gravity (CG) is behind the main wheel so the glider sits nose high on the ground. Other designs may have the CG forward of the main wheel so the nose rests on a nose-wheel or skid when stopped. Skids are now mainly used only on training gliders such as the Schweizer SGS 2–33. Skids are around 100 millimetres (4 in) wide by 900 mm (3 ft) long and run from the nose to the main wheel. Skids help with braking after landing by allowing the pilot to put forward pressure on the control stick, thus creating friction between the skid and the ground. The wingtips also have small skids or wheels to protect the wingtips from ground contact.

In most high-performance gliders, the undercarriage can be raised to reduce drag in flight and lowered for landing. Wheel brakes are provided to allow stopping once on the ground. These may be engaged by fully extending the spoilers/air brakes or by using a separate control. Although there is only a single main wheel, the glider's wing can be kept level by using the flight controls until it is almost stationary.

Pilots usually land back at the airfield from which they took off, but a landing is possible in any flat field about 250 metres long. Ideally, should circumstances permit, a glider would fly a standard pattern, or circuit, in preparation for landing, typically starting at a height of 300 metres (1,000 ft). Glide slope control devices are then used to adjust the height to ensure landing at the desired point. The ideal landing pattern positions the glider on final approach so that a deployment of 30–60% of the spoilers/dive brakes/flaps brings it to the desired touchdown point. In this way, the pilot has the option of opening or closing the spoilers/air brakes to extend or steepen the descent to reach the touchdown point. This gives the pilot wide safety margins should unexpected events occur. If such control devices are not sufficient, the pilot may utilize maneuvers such as a forward slip to further steepen the glider slope.

== Auxiliary engines ==
Most gliders require assistance to launch, though some have an engine powerful enough to launch unaided. In addition, a high proportion of new gliders have an engine that will sustain the glider in the air, though these are insufficiently powerful to launch the glider. Compared with self-launchers, these lower-powered engines have advantages in weight, lower costs, and pilot licensing. The engines can be electric, jet, or two-stroke gasoline.

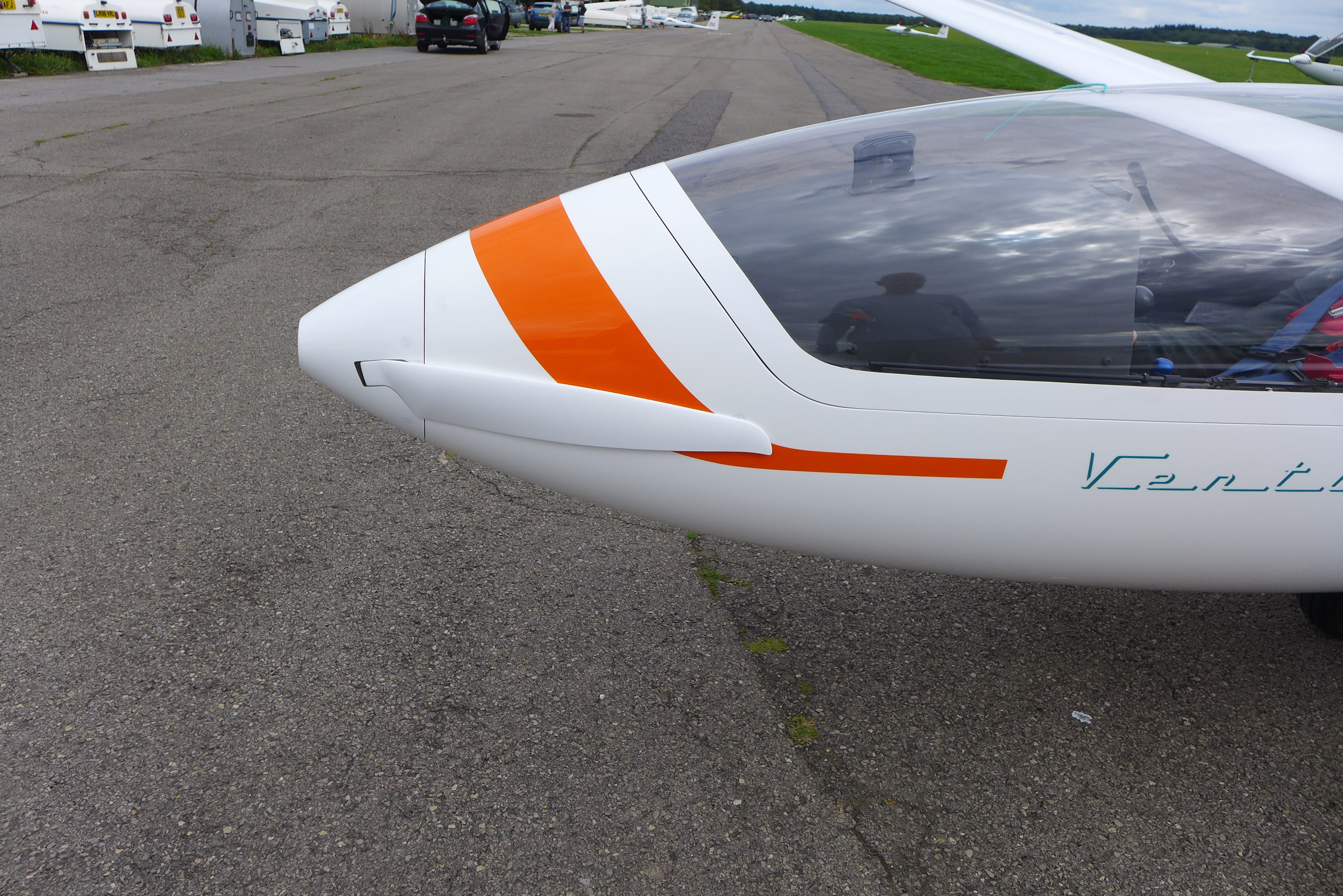
Glider showing propeller of front electric sustainer.

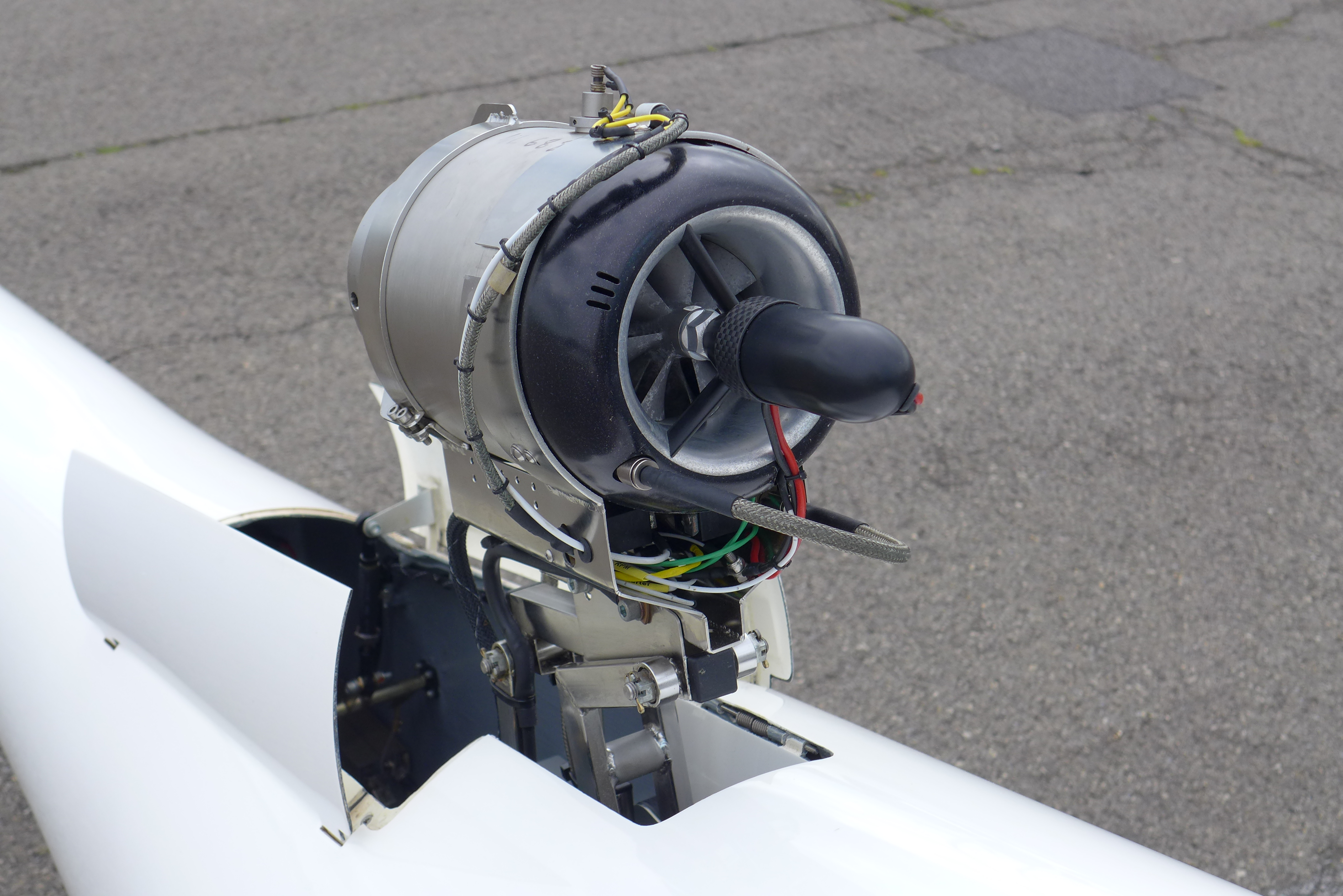
Small retractable jet engines are on some types such as this HPH Shark

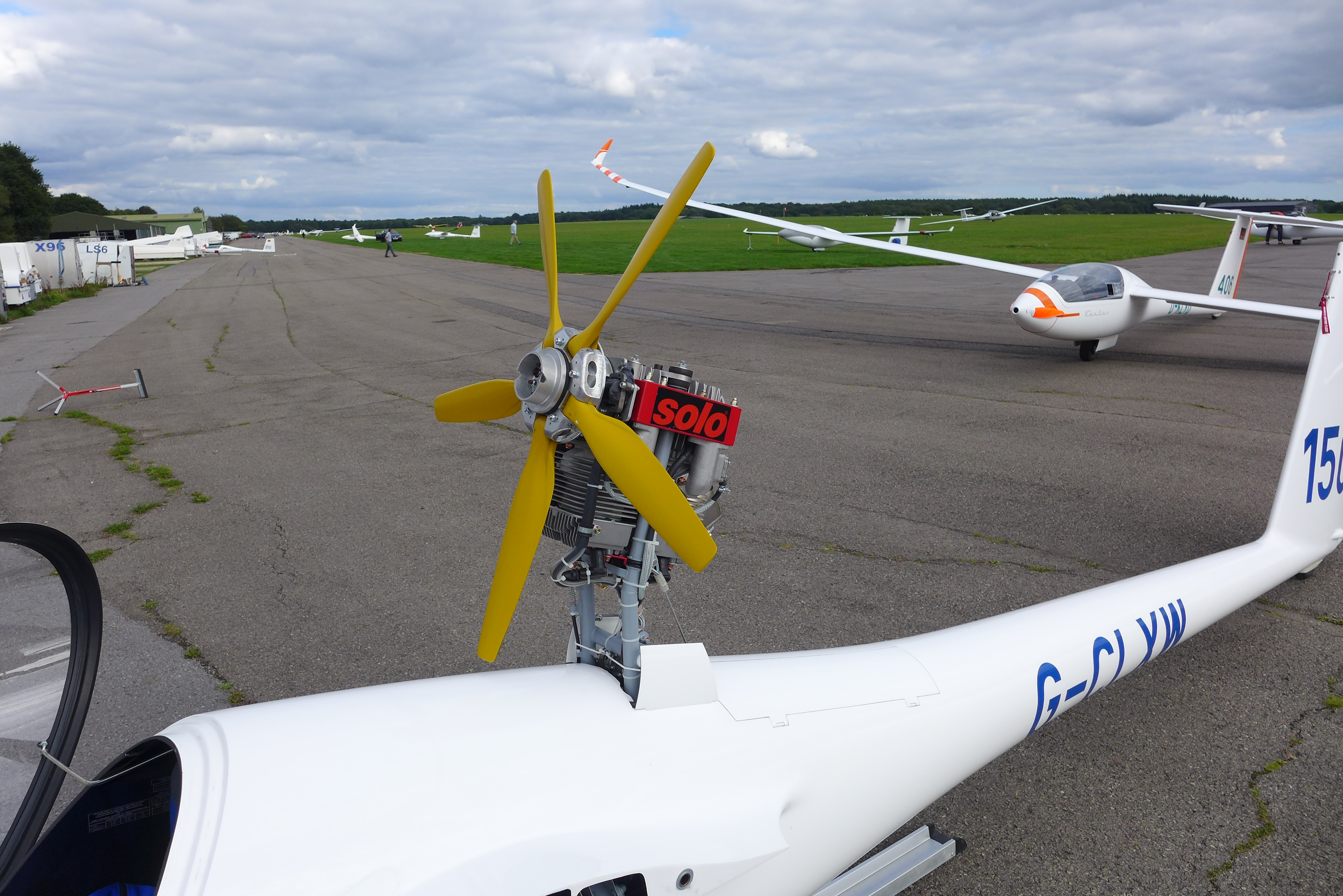
Retractable turbo two-stroke sustainer engine

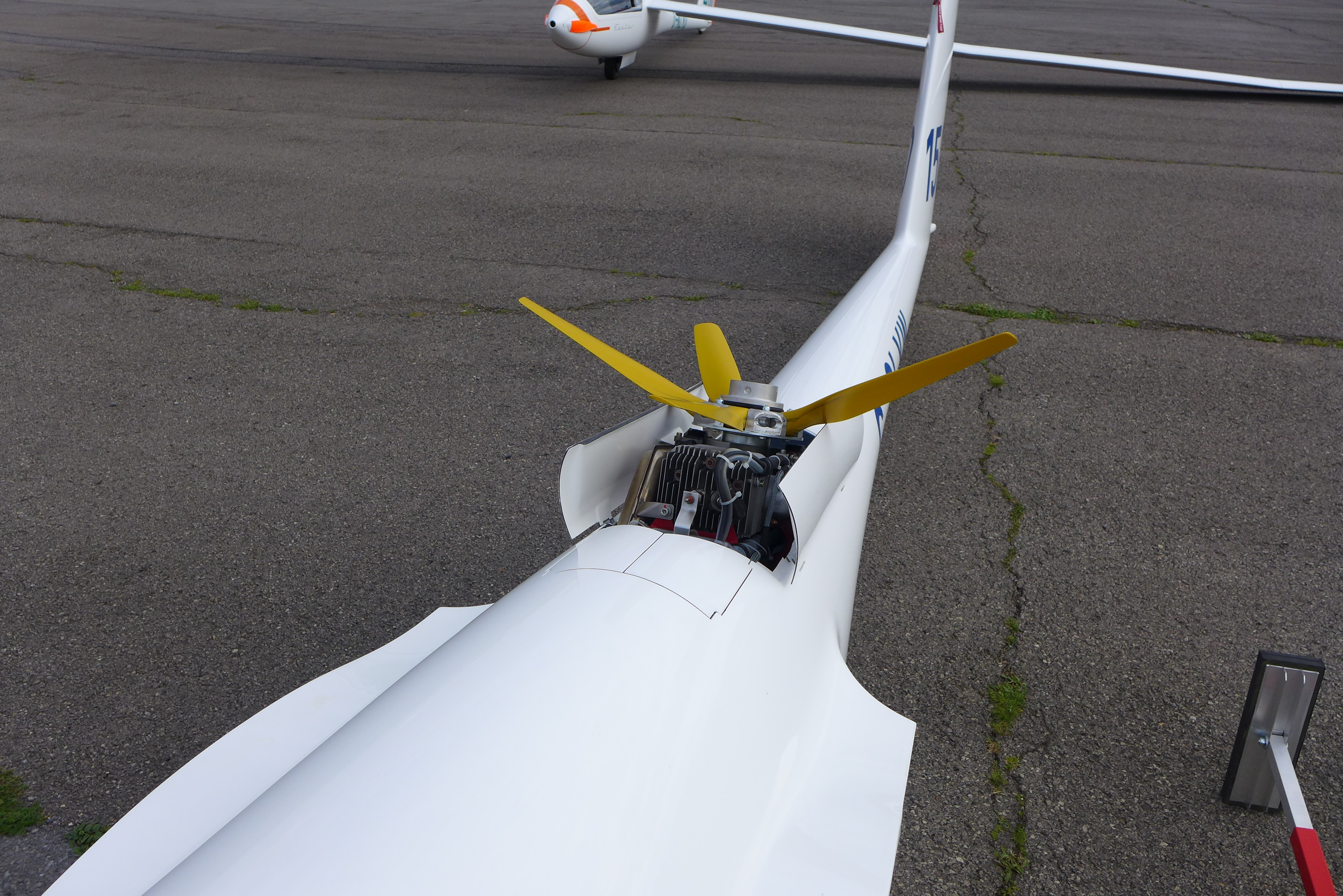
Turbo engine retracting 1

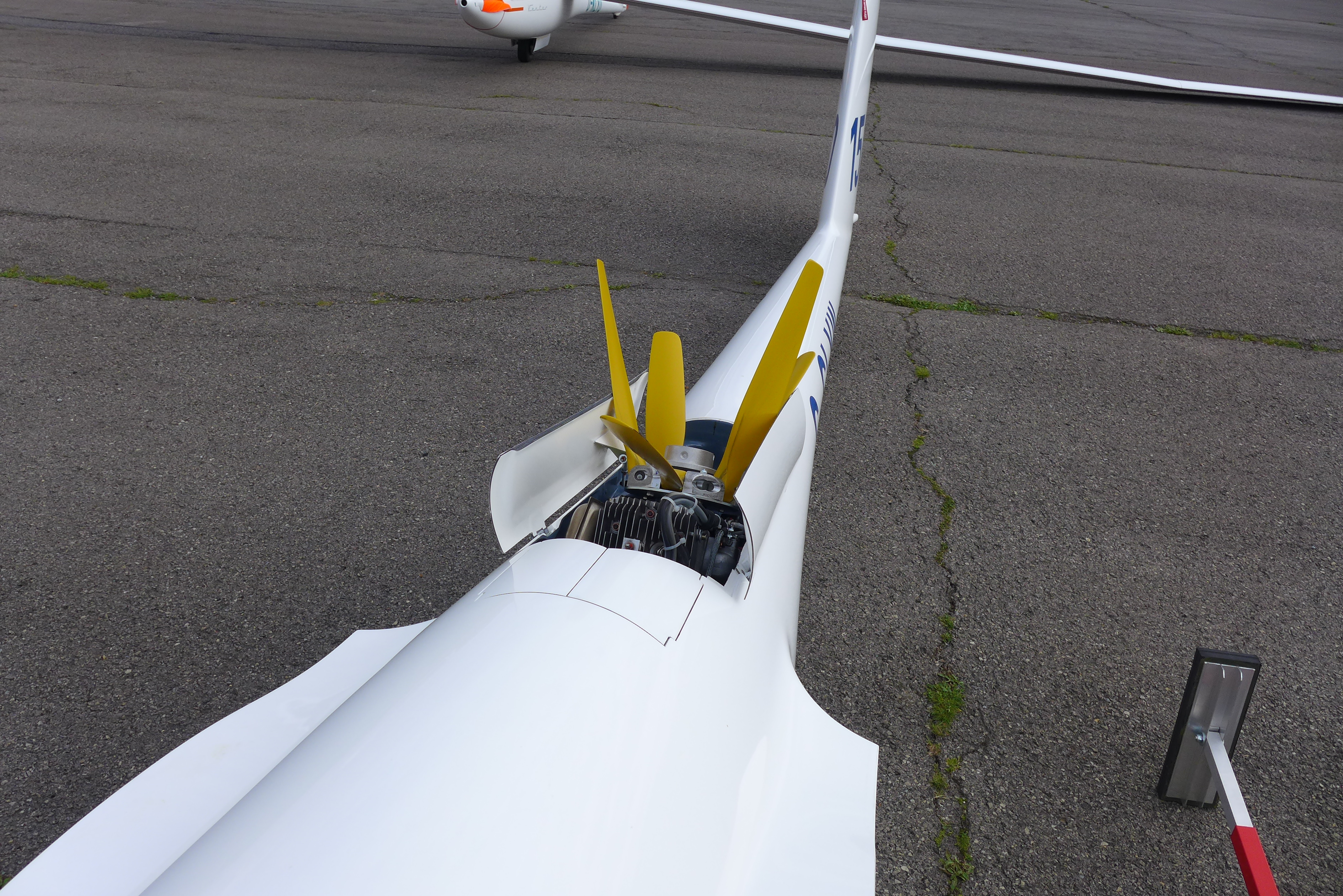
Turbo engine retracting 2

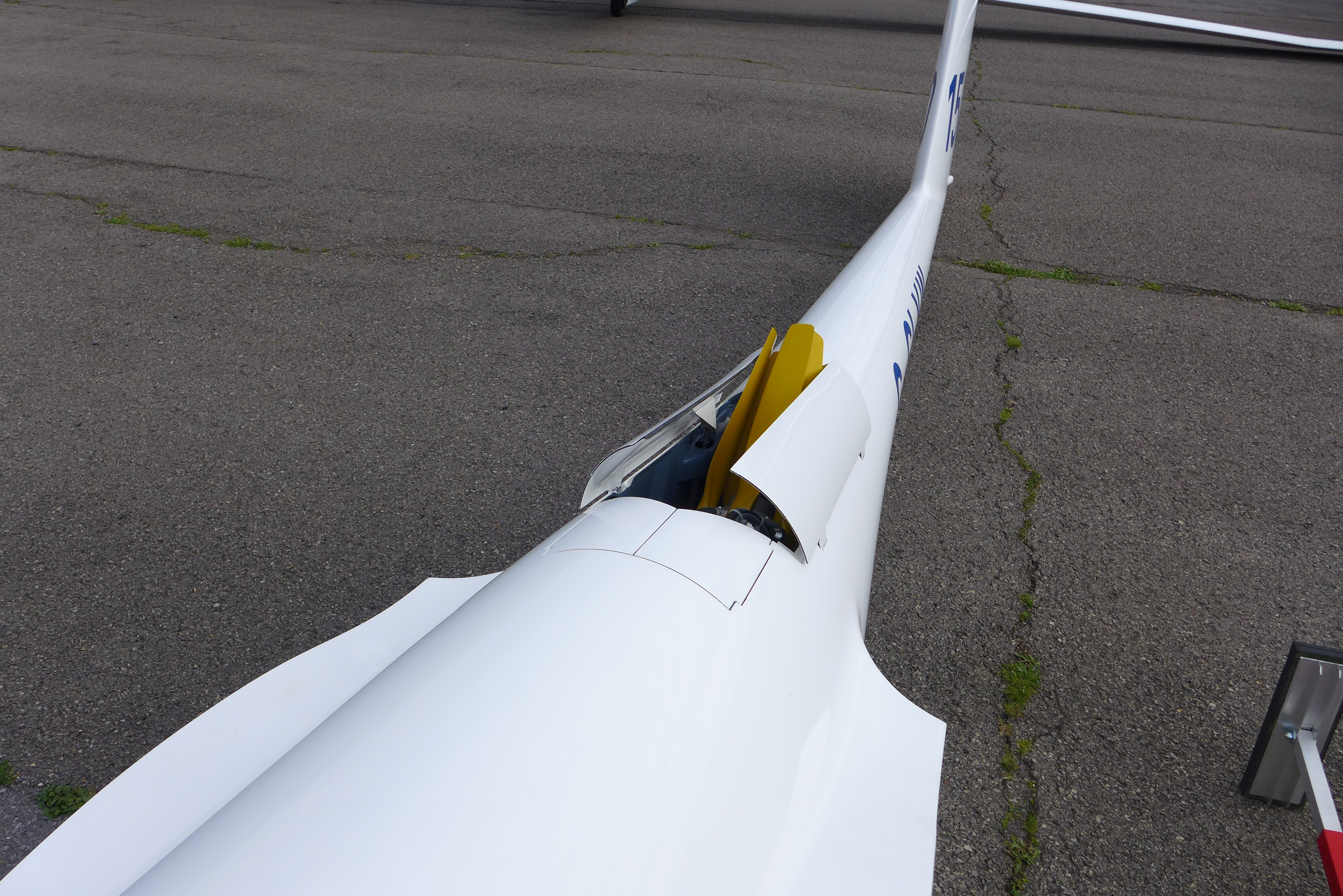
Turbo engine retracting 3

== Instrumentation and other technical aids ==
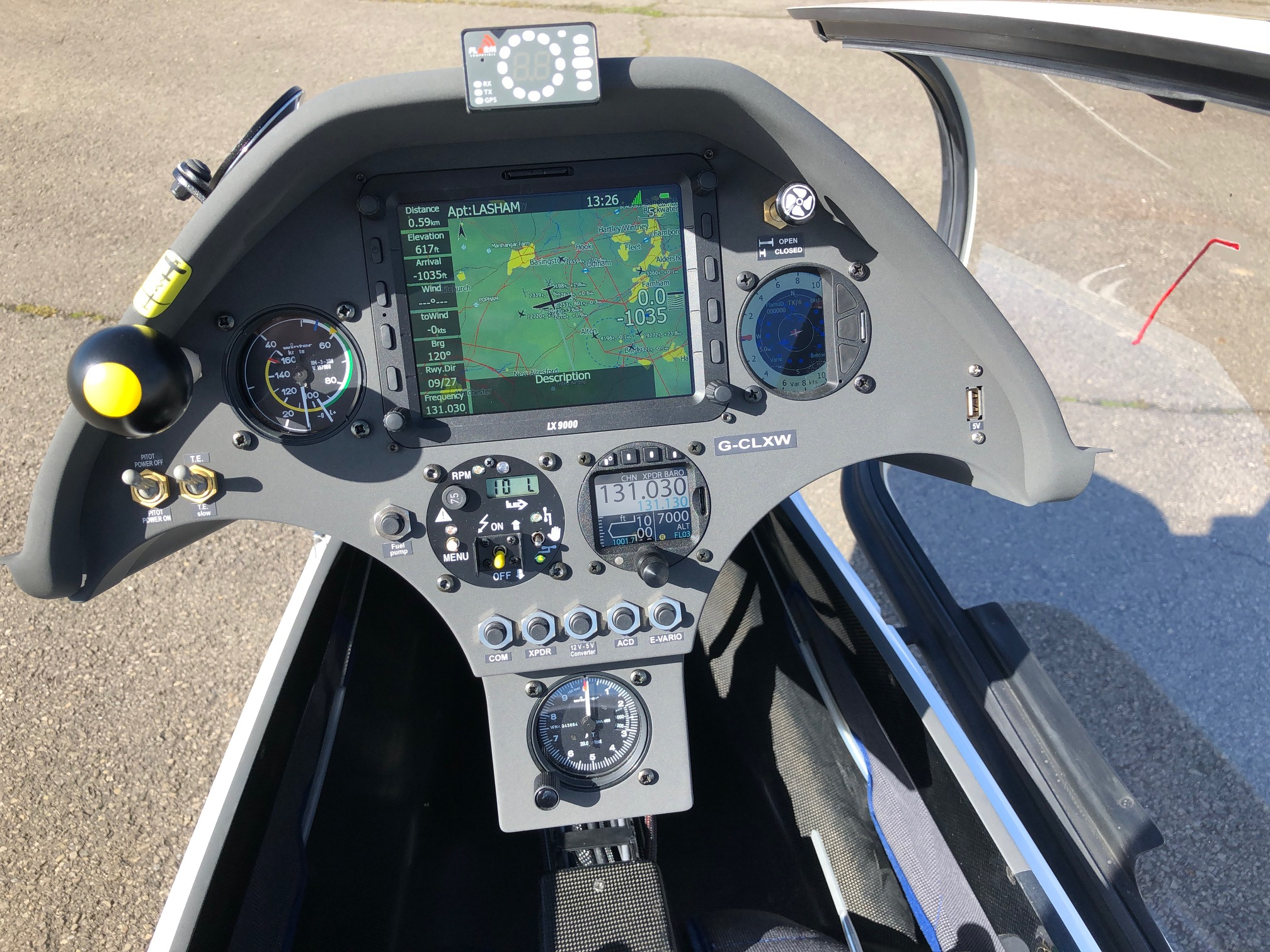
Instrument panel for a sailplane. Click on image to see a detailed description (Schempp-Hirth Ventus-3)

Gliders in continental Europe use metric units, like km/h for airspeed and m/s for lift and sink rate. In the United States, United Kingdom, Australia, and some other countries, gliders use knots and ft/min in common with commercial aviation worldwide.

In addition to an altimeter, compass, and airspeed indicator, gliders are often equipped with a variometer and an airband radio (transceiver), each of which may be required in some countries. A transponder may be installed to assist controllers when the glider is crossing busy or controlled airspace. This may be supplemented by ADS-B. Without these devices, access to some airspace may become increasingly restricted in some countries. In countries where cloud-flying is allowed, an artificial horizon or a turn and slip indicator is used when there is zero visibility. Increasingly, anti-collision warning systems such as FLARM are also used and are even mandatory in some European countries. An Emergency Position-Indicating Radio Beacon (ELT) may also be fitted into the glider to reduce search and rescue time in case of an accident.

Much more than in other types of aviation, glider pilots depend on the variometer, which is a very sensitive vertical speed indicator, to measure the climb or sink rate of the plane. This enables the pilot to detect minute changes caused when the glider enters rising or sinking air masses. Most often electronic 'varios' are fitted to a glider, though mechanical varios are often installed as backup. The electronic variometers produce a modulated sound of varying amplitude and frequency depending on the strength of the lift or sink, so that the pilot can concentrate on centering a thermal, watching for other traffic, on navigation, and on weather conditions. Rising air is announced to the pilot as a rising tone, with increasing pitch as the lift increases. Conversely, descending air is announced with a lowering tone, which advises the pilot to escape the sink area as soon as possible. (Refer to the variometer article for more information).

Variometers are sometimes fitted with mechanical or electronic devices to indicate the optimal speed to fly for given conditions. The MacCready setting can be input electronically or adjusted using a ring surrounding the dial. These devices are based on the mathematical theory attributed to Paul MacCready though it was first described by Wolfgang Späte in 1938. MacCready theory solves the problem of how fast a pilot should cruise between thermals, given both the average lift the pilot expects in the next thermal climb, as well as the amount of lift or sink encountered in cruise mode. Electronic variometers make the same calculations automatically, after allowing for factors such as the glider's theoretical performance, water ballast, headwinds/tailwinds, and insects on the leading edges of the wings.

Soaring flight computers running specialized soaring software have been designed for use in gliders. Using GPS technology alongside a barometric device, these tools can:

- Provide the glider's position in 3 dimensions by a moving map display
- Alert the pilot to nearby airspace restrictions
- Indicate position along track and remaining distance and course direction
- Show airports within theoretical gliding distance
- Determine wind direction and speed at current altitude
- Show historical lift information
- Create a GPS log of the flight to provide proof for contests and gliding badges
- Provide "final" glide information (i.e., showing if the glider can reach the finish without additional lift).
- Indicate the best speed to fly under current conditions

After the flight, GPS data may be replayed using computer software for analysis; it may also be used to follow the trace of one or more gliders against a backdrop of a map, an aerial photograph, or the airspace.

== Markings ==
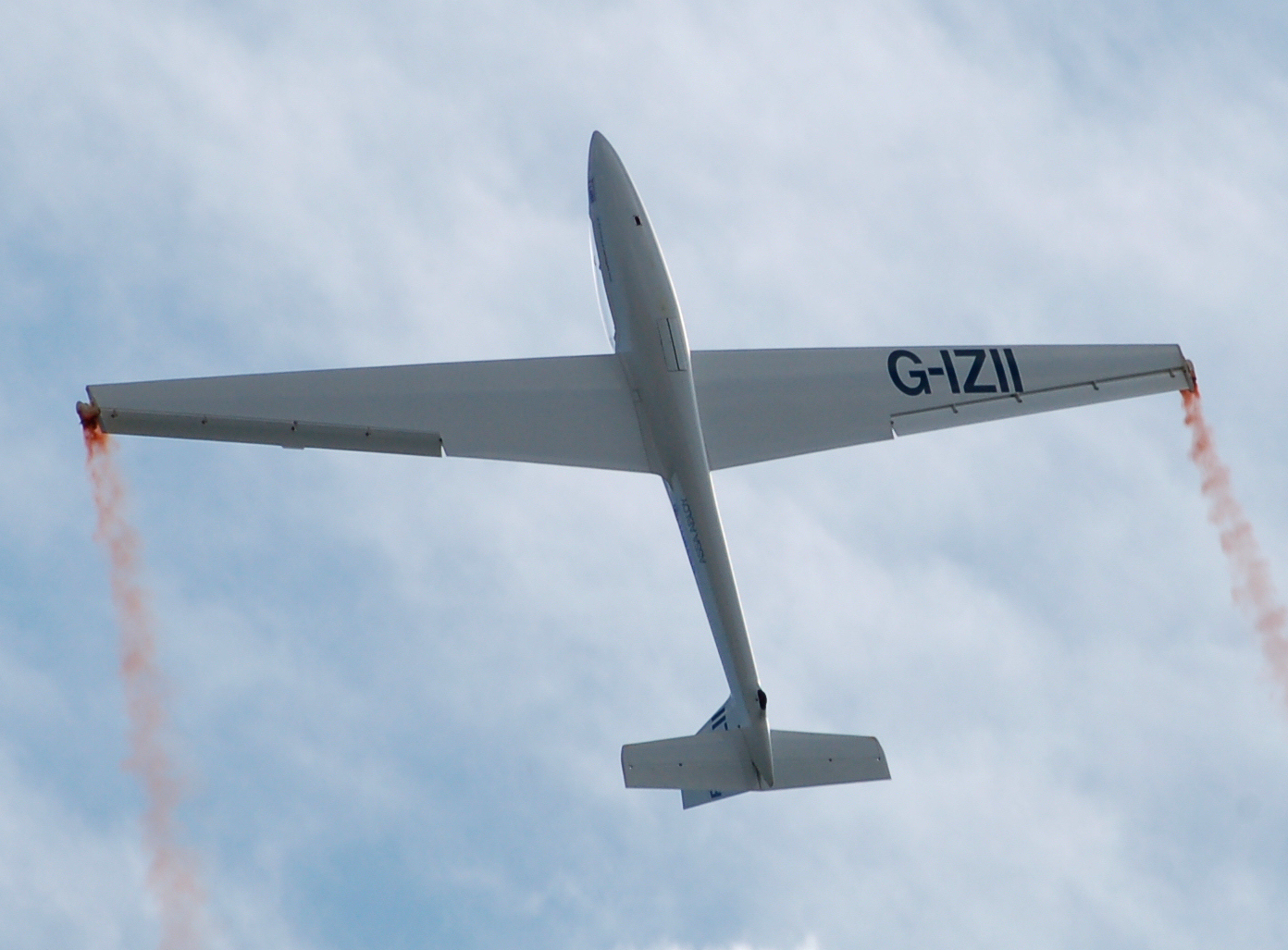
Swift S-1 of the UK Swift Aerobatic Display Team at Kemble 2009

To ensure that ground-based observers may identify gliders in flight or in gliding competition, registration marks ("insignias" or "competition numbers" or "contest ID") are displayed in large characters on the underside of a single wing; they also appear also on the fin and rudder. Registration marks are assigned by gliding associations such as the US Soaring Society of America and are unrelated to national registrations issued by entities such as the US Federal Aviation Administration. This need for visual ID has somewhat been supplanted by GPS position recording. Insignias are useful in two ways: first, they are used in radio communications between gliders, as pilots use their competition number as their call signs. Secondly, to easily tell a glider's contest ID when flying near one another to alert them of potential dangers. For example, during gatherings of multiple gliders within thermals (known as "gaggles"), one pilot might report, "Six-Seven-Romeo, I am right below you."

Fibreglass gliders are invariably painted white to minimise their skin temperature in sunlight. Fibreglass resin loses strength as its temperature rises into the range achievable in direct sun on a hot day. Color is not used except for a few small bright patches on wingtips; these patches (typically orange or red) improve a glider's visibility to other airborne aircraft. Such patches are obligatory for mountain flying in France. Non-fibreglass gliders made of aluminum or wood are not so subject to deterioration at higher temperatures and are often quite brightly painted.

== Comparison of types ==
There is sometimes confusion about gliders/sailplanes, hang gliders, and paragliders. In particular, paragliders and hang gliders are both foot-launched. The main differences between the types are:

	Paragliders	Hang gliders	Gliders/Sailplanes
Undercarriage	pilot's legs used for take-off and landing	pilot's legs used for take-off and landing	aircraft takes off and lands using a wheeled undercarriage or skids
Wing structure	entirely flexible, with shape maintained purely by the pressure of air flowing into and over the wing in flight and the tension of the lines	generally flexible but supported on a rigid frame which determines its shape (note that rigid-wing hang gliders also exist)	rigid wing surface which totally encases wing structure
Pilot position	sitting in a harness	usually lying prone in a cocoon-like harness suspended from the wing; seated and supine are also possible	sitting in a seat with a harness, surrounded by a crash-resistant structure
Speed range (stall speed – max speed)	slowest – typically 25 to 60 km/h for recreational gliders (over 50 km/h requires use of speed bar), hence easier to launch and fly in light winds; least wind penetration; pitch variation can be achieved with the controls	faster than paragliders, slower than gliders/sailplaines	maximum speed up to about 280 km/h (170 mph); stall speed typically 65 km/h (40 mph); able to fly in windier turbulent conditions and can outrun bad weather; good penetration into a headwind
Maximum glide ratio	about 10, relatively poor glide performance makes long distance flights more difficult; current (as of July 2025) world record is 609.9 kilometres (380 mi)	about 17, with up to 20 for rigid wings	open class sailplanes – typically around 60:1, but in more common 15–18 meter span aircraft, glide ratios are between 38:1 and 52:1; high glide performance enabling long distance flight, with 3,000 kilometres (1,900 mi) being current (as of November 2010) record
Turn radius	tightest turn radius	somewhat larger turn radius than paragliders, tigher than gliders/sailplanes	widest turn radius but still able to circle tightly in thermals
Landing	smallest space needed to land, offering more landing options from cross-country flights; also easiest to pack up and carry like a bag to the nearest road	15 m to 60 m length flat area required; can be derigged by one person and carried to the nearest road	landings can be performed in ~250 m length field. Aerial retrieval may be possible but if not, specialized trailer needed to retrieve by road. Some sailplanes have engines that remove the need for an out-landing, if successfully started on time
Learning	simplest and quickest to learn	teaching is done in single and two-seat hang gliders	teaching is done in a two-seat glider with dual controls
Convenience	packs smaller (easier to transport and store)	more awkward to transport and store; longer to rig and de-rig; often transported on the roof of a car	often stored and transported in purpose-built trailers about 9 metres long, from which they are rigged. Although rigging aids allow a single person to rig a glider, usually the rigging involves 2 or 3 people. Some frequently used sailplanes are stored already rigged in hangars.
Cost	cost of new is €1500 and up, cheapest but shortest lasting (around 500 hours flying time, depending on treatment), active second-hand market		cost of new glider very high (top of the range 18 m turbo with instruments and trailer €250,000) but it is long lasting (up to several decades), so active second-hand market; typical cost is from €2,000 to €145,000

== Competition classes ==
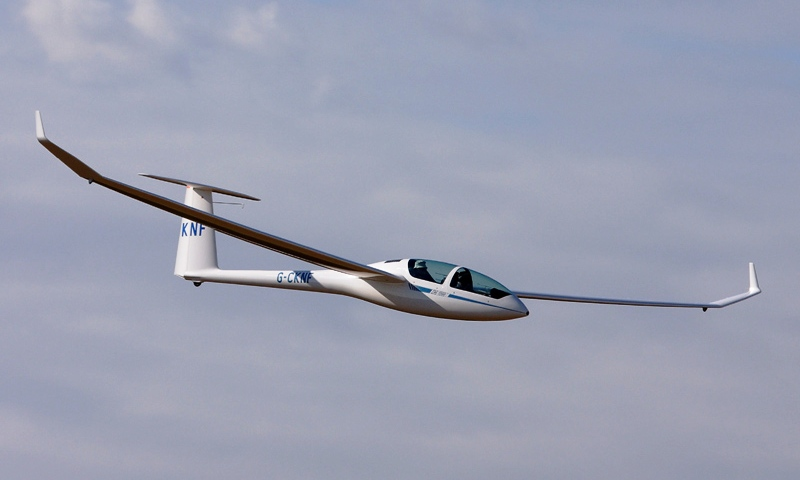
DG Flugzeugbau DG-1000 of the Two Seater Class

Eight competition classes of glider have been defined by the FAI. They are:

- Standard Class (No flaps, 15 m wing-span, water ballast allowed)
- 15 metre Class (Flaps allowed, 15 m wing-span, water ballast allowed)
- 18 metre Class (Flaps allowed, 18 m wing-span, water ballast allowed)
- Open Class (No restrictions except a limit of 850 kg for the maximum all-up weight)
- Two Seater Class (maximum wing-span of 20 m), also known by the German name "Doppelsitzer"
- Club Class (This class allows a wide range of older small gliders with different performance, so the scores have to be adjusted by handicapping. Water ballast is not allowed).
- World Class (The FAI Gliding Commission which is part of the FAI and an associated body called Organisation Scientifique et Technique du Vol à Voile (OSTIV) announced a competition in 1989 for a low-cost glider, which had moderate performance, was easy to assemble and to handle, and was safe for low-hours pilots to fly. The winning design was announced in 1993 as the Warsaw Polytechnic PW-5. This allows competitions to be run with only one type of glider.)
- Ultralight Class, for gliders with a maximum mass less than 220 kg.

== Major manufacturers ==
A large proportion of gliders have been and are still made in Germany, the birthplace of the sport. In Germany there are several manufacturers but the three principal companies are:

- DG Flugzeugbau GmbH
- Schempp-Hirth GmbH
- Alexander Schleicher GmbH & Co

Germany also has Stemme and Lange Aviation. Elsewhere in the world, there are other manufacturers such as Jonker Sailplanes in South Africa, Sportinė Aviacija in Lithuania, Allstar PZL in Poland, Let Kunovice and HpH in the Czech Republic and AMS Flight in Slovenia.

== See also ==
- Glider types
- List of gliders
- Military glider

History

- Rhön-Rossitten Gesellschaft
- Schweizer brothers

Gliding as a sport

- Gliding
- Gliding competition

Other unpowered aircraft

- Rotor kite
- Unpowered aircraft

Unpowered flying toys and models

- Paper plane
- Radio-controlled glider

	Aerostat	Aerodyne		
	Lift: Lighter than air gas	Lift: Fixed wing	Lift: Unpowered rotor	Lift: Powered rotor
Unpowered free flight	(Free) balloon	Glider	Helicopter, etc. in autorotation	(None – see note 2)
Tethered (static or towed)	Tethered balloon	Kite	Rotor kite	(None – see note 2)
Powered	Airship	Airplane, ornithopter, etc.	Autogyro	Gyrodyne, helicopter
