= List of German gliders =

This is a list of gliders/sailplanes of the world, (this reference lists all gliders with references, where available) Note: Any aircraft can glide for a short time, but gliders are designed to glide for longer.

== German miscellaneous constructors ==
- Agfa Dessau F.V / Maschinenbau-Schule Dessau
- Akaflieg
  - Akaflieg Karlsruhe
    - AK-1
    - AK-2
    - AK-5
    - AK-5B
    - AK-8
    - AK-X
- Allgaier Geier – Josef Allgaier
- Andersson Datschi – A.J. Andersson
- Alexander_Schleicher_GmbH_&_Co
  - ASW-12
  - ASW-15
  - ASW-17
  - ASK-18
  - ASW-19
  - ASW-20
  - ASK-21
  - ASW-22
  - AS 22-2
  - ASK-23
  - ASW-24
  - ASH-25
  - ASH-26
  - ASW-27
  - ASW-28
  - ASG-29
  - ASH-30
  - ASH-31
  - ASG-32
  - AS 33
- Bachem Lerche – Erich Bachem
- Baden-Baden glider – Segelflugzeugwerke Baden-Baden
- Bahr (glider)
- Benz Be-2 – Ing. Hans Benz, Mönchen-Gladbach.
- Berliner Segelflugvereins 1923 primary
- Binder EB28 – Binder Motorenbau GmbH
- Binder EB29 – Binder Motorenbau GmbH
- Binder ASH-25 EB28 – Binder Motorenbau GmbH
- Blessing Rebell – Gerhard Blessing
- Blessing V-7 Gleiter-Max
- Böhm Schmankerl
- Bölkow Phoebus
- Bonn Helge
- Bonn I Vulkan
- Bonn Schlägel und Eisen
- Bremen-Lane
- Bremer Max
- Bremer Strolch
- BS 1K
- BSV 1923 glider- Berliner Segelflugverein
- BSV Luftikus – Berliner Segelflugverein – HOHMUTH, Otto
- Budig 1921 glider – Friedrich Wilhelm Budig
- Waibel-Butler Concordia WAIBEL, Gerhard & BUTLER, Dick & BOERMANS, Loek & DILLINGER, Johannes
- D-Helios aka Berlin HFS Helios – Heinz Kensche – NSDFK Ortsgruppe Berlin
- D.D. Zögling – Hermann Aecherli & Willy Farner
- Daimler L15 -H. Klemm – Daimler-Motoren-Gesellschaft Werke
- Delta 1
- Derwitzer
- Der Dessauer
- Dessau Agfa – Maschinenbau-Schule Dessau
- Glaser-Dirks Flugzeugbau GmbH
  - DG-100 (Standard Class)
  - DG-200 (15 metre Class)
  - DG-300 (Standard Class)
  - DG-400 (Self-launching motor glider)
  - DG-500 (Two seater)
  - DG-600 (15 metre and 18 meter Class)
- DG Flugzeugbau GmbH
  - DG-808C (15 metre and 18 metre)
  - DG-1001 (Two seater)
- Erfurt Erfurt – Erfurter Verein für Luftfahrt e.V., Erfurt
- Eta (glider)
- Eta Biter
- Etrich-Wels 1906 glider – Igo Etrich & Franz Wels
- FAB 3 – Flugtechnische Arbeitsgemeinschaft an der Ingenieurschule Beuth
- Fisher-Boretzki Fibo 2a – Hans Fischer & Boretzki
- Focke-Wulf Kranich III
- Freiherr von Lüttwitz glider
- Fulda Erlkönig – Modell-und Segelflugverein, Fulda
- Fulda Fulda – Modell-und Segelflugverein, Fulda
- Glasfaser Nimeta – Nimbus 4 / Eta amalgam
- Glasflügel
  - Glasflügel BS-1
  - Glasflügel H-30 GFK
  - Glasflügel H-101 Salto
  - Glasflügel H-201 Standard-Libelle
  - Glasflügel H-301 Libelle
  - Glasflügel 202 Standard-Libelle
  - Glasflügel 203 Standard-Libelle
  - Glasflügel 204 Standard-Libelle
  - Glasflügel 205 Club Libelle
  - Glasflügel 206 Hornet
  - Glasflügel Hornet C
  - Glasflügel 303 Mosquito
  - Glasflügel 304
  - Glasflügel 401 Kestrel
  - Glasflügel 402
  - Glasflügel 604
  - Hansjörg Streifeneder Falcon
- Gnewikow Gne-3 – Karl Gnewikow
- Görlitz I – D. L. V.-Gruppe, Görlitz
- Göttingen IV Niedersachsen – Flieger Ortsgruppe Göttingen
- Graf von Saurma Milan
- Grob G102 Astir
- Grob G103 Twin
- Grob G104 Speed Astir
- Gropp Zaunkönig – GROPP, Herbert
- Günar 1
- Haase-Kensche-Schmetz HKS-1
- Haessler-Villinger HV-1 Mufli – man-powered – Helmut Haessler & Villinger
- Hamborger Jung
- Hamburg Störtebecker – Flugt. Verein Hamburg
- Harbich Ha-12/ 49 Leopold Harbich developed from SG-38
- Harth S-1 (Friedrich Harth)
- Heide FS-16 Wippsterz – Heide
- Heidelberg Kurpfalz Sauzahn – R. Ek & H. G. Bader Wagonfabrik Fuchs, Heidelberg
- Heinkel Greif II – Heinkel Speyer – Ernst Heinkel A.G.
- Heinkel He 162S
- Helios (glider) – Hochschule für Schauspielkunst Berlin – (HFS Berlin)
- Hentzens Maikäfer
- HG-1 Tölpel
- Hirth-Hütter Goevier III – Dipl.-Ing. Wolf Hirth/Wolfgang Hütter.
- Hofmann Schloß Mainberg – H. Hofmann Kegel-Flugzeugbau, Kassel
- HpH 304 – =HpH Ltd
- Hoffmann H-36 Dimona – Wolf Hoffmann Flugzeugbau KG
- Horten-Schäfer Aachen – designed by Reimar Horten & Schäfer_ built by Christiani Wassertechnik GmbH
- Icaré 1 – Stuttgart University – Solar powered motorglider
- Icaré 2 – Stuttgart University – Solar powered motorglider
- Illerfalke
- Junkers Ju 322 Mammut – Mammoth – Junkers Flugzeug-Werke A.G. Dessau
- Jupp-Pitter
- Ka-1
- Ka-2
- Ka-3
- Ka-4
- Ka-6
- Ka-7
- Ka-8
- Ka-10
- ASK 13
- Kassel 1926 glider – PAUL, Fritz
- Kegel III – Max Kegel
- Kirchner Futurum
- Kirchner Hessenland – Wilhelm Kirchner – Niederhessischer Verein für Luftfahrt
- Kirchner La Pruvo – Wilhelm Kirchner at Kassel
- Köhl Nurflügler – Hermann Köhl aka Koehl Ko-1
- Kolibri-B – Sportverein Merseburg
- Königsberg Lüwa III – Ostpreußischer Verein für Luftfahrt, Königsberg
- Konrad Ko Ro-4 – F. Konrad – Konrad-Segelflugzeugbau, Rosenheim (Obb.)
- Kortenbach & Rauh Kora 1 – designed by Schultes, Seidel and Putz
- Krekel Grille – Paul Krekel- Hans H. Hünebeck, Metall- und Rohrbau, Duisburg.
- Krüger Schlägel und Eisen – Hermann Landmann & Nowack
- Ksoll Breslau – J. Ksoll
- Ksoll Galgenvogel I – J. Ksoll
- Ksoll Galgenvogel III – J. Ksoll
- Kurten Sie3 – Siebert Sie3?
- Langhammer L-10 Libelle – Egon Scheibe / Bitz-Linner-Zoller
- Laubenthal Lore – Paul Laubenthal
- LCF-II – Luftsport-Club Friedrichshafen
- LFG Boot-Phönix – G. Baatz – LFG (Luftfahrzeug-Ges.), Stralsund
- Lilienthal Hang Gliders
- LO 120 S – LO-Fluggerätebau
- Lommatzsch FES-530 Lehrmeister - Volkseigener Betrieb Flugzeug Lommatzsch, DDR
- Rolladen-Schneider Flugzeugbau
  - LS1 (Standard Class)
  - LSD Ornith (two seater prototype)
  - LS2 (15 metre Class, though before the present classes existed)
  - LS3 (15 metre Class)
  - LS4 (Standard Class)
  - LS5 (22 metre prototype only)
  - LS6 (15 metre Class with optional tips to give 17.5 metres or 18 metre spans)
  - LS7 (Standard Class)
  - LS8 (Standard Class with optional tips to give 18 metre span)
  - LS9 (18 metre self-launching glider – 10 built)
  - LS10 (15 metre Class and 18 metre Class)
  - LS11 (Two Seater Class) – prototype in development by Akaflieg Köln9
- Lutz Welu-48
- Luty Ly-542 K Stösser – Lüty, Paul – Sportflugzeugbau, Hülserstrasse 398, Krefeld
- M&D Flugzeugbau Samburo
- Mähr.-Schönberg S. E. II – H. Kromer – Deutscher Fliegerbund, Mähr.-Schönberg
- Markmann Mark-10
- Martens Pegasus – A. Martens
- Martens S – A. Martens
- Meinigen
- Meusel M-IV – Horst Meusel – Verein für Luftfahrt e.V., Zittau
- Milbert Hansa – Milbert – Hamburger Flugzeugbau (?)
- Milomei M1 Michael-Lorenz Meier
- Milomei M2
- Moazagotl – (Hirth ordered, Wenk designed, Schneider built)
- Möller Stormann – Flugzeugbau Möller
- Eichhorn Möwe – Eichhorn – NSFK Ortsgruppe Bielefeld
- Nipp Bremen-Lane – Ernst Nipp
- Niemcy Bräutigam
- Nürnberg D-14 Doppeldecker – E. Ittner – Nordbayr. Luftfahrtverband, Nürnberg
- Oller Dussel
- Onigkeit 1938 glider – Otto Onigkeit
- OziteThoenes, A. (?) – OZITE-Verkaufs GmbH
- Pelzner C – Pelzner, Willy
- Pelzner Hang Glider
- Pelzner Hängegleiter 1920 – Willy Pelzner
- Peyean Boot I – K. Peyean
- Peyean Boot II – K. Peyean
- Peyean Schwalbe – K. Peyean
- Pflumm Schleppgleiter
- Platz glider – Reinhold Platz
- Richter Möwe – Hans Richter
- Riedel PR-1 – Peter Riedel
- Riedel PR-2 – Peter Riedel
- Rostock M III – Kreckel, P. – Mecklenburgische Aero-Klub, Rostock'
- Roter Vogel – Baumer Aero Company
- Saurma-Jeltsch motor-glider
- Schempp-Hirth
  - Göppingen Gö 1 Wolf sailplane, 1935
  - ...
  - Göppingen Gö 9 development aircraft for Dornier Do 335 Pfeil, 1941
  - Standard Austria sailplane line
  - Schempp-Hirth SHK
  - Cirrus
  - Standard Cirrus
  - Discus
  - Discus-2
  - Ventus
  - Ventus-2
  - Ventus-3
  - Nimbus
  - Nimbus-2
  - Nimbus-3
  - Nimbus-4
  - Mini-Nimbus
  - Janus
  - Duo Discus
  - Arcus
  - Quintus
- Schlesien in Not
- Schmid MS-4 – M. Schmid
- Schmid MS-5
- Schmid S-1
- Schröder-Peters SP-1 V1 – SCHRÖDER, Josef & Heinz Peters – Flugzeugbau Köhler/ Peters, Fulda
- Schul-Marczinski Stadt Magdeburg
- Schwarzwald-Flugzeugbau Donaueschingen Ibis (RLM 108–64)
- Schwarzwald-Flugzeugbau Donaueschingen Strolch (RLM 108–62)
- Seehase MD-2 – Hans Seehase
- Seiler D-1
- Siebert Sie-3 – designer Wilhelm Kurten – production Siebert
- SM-5 (glider)
- Stähls Lo 170 – Bodo Stähls
- Steinleher-Huber SH-2H – Fritz Steinleher sen., Peter Huber
- Strandpromenade
- Strauber-Frommhold Mistral – Strauber-Frommhold GmbH
- Sturm Super Orchidee – Bräutigam, Bernhard
- Stuttgart I – P Brenner- Flugtechnischer Verein Stuttgart
- Stuttgart II – P. Brenner & M. Schrenk – Flugtechnischer Verein Stuttgart
- Thoenes Alexander-der-Kleine – A. Thoenes
- Udet Alpensegler – 1927, design P.Zarbl, calculation Fritz Wertenson
- Ursinus 1925 – URSINUS, Oskar – man-powered ornithopter
- Wagener H.F.V. 17 Pirat – H. Wagener
- Westpreussen (glider) – Heinrich Hofmann
- WWS WM-1 – Wiegand und Wisser Sportflugzeugbau GmbH & Co. KG
- Wimmer-Dewald Leonardo 2000 – Josef Immer & Alexander Dewald
- Wind Wi-1 – Willy Wind
- Windhund – Hohmuth-Konstruktion der Berliner Segelflieger
- Württemberg (glider) – Wolf Hirth
- Zeise-Nesemann Bird – Zeise & A. Nesemann
- Zeise-Nesemann Senator – A. Nesemann
- Zwickau Sorgenkind – Flugtechnischer Verein, Zwickau
- Zeise 1921 MPA
