= Kestrel 22 =

Kestrel 22 may refer to:

- Glasflügel 604, a German sailplane design, also called the Kestrel 22
- Seafarer 23 Kestrel, also called the Kestrel 22
