= Akaflieg Karlsruhe =

- Founded: 1928 and 1951
- Type: Non-profit
- Purpose: Student aviation research
- Website: www.akaflieg-karlsruhe.de

Akaflieg Karlsruhe is one of ten flying groups (Akaflieg) attached to German universities. Akaflieg is an abbreviation for Akademische Fliegergruppe, an academic group of students working with a German University. The Akademische Fliegergruppe Karlsruhe e.V. (Akaflieg Karlsruhe) - (Academic Aviator Group Karlsruhe) is a group of students enrolled at Karlsruhe Institute of Technology, who are involved with the development and the design of gliders, as well as research in aerodynamics.

== History ==
=== Akaflieg Karlsruhe from 1928 to 1933 ===
In the winter semester of 1927/28 a glider group was founded by Karl Töpfer, Assistant at the chair for motor vehicles with a teaching assignment for aircraft technology. The association was registered as Academic Flying Club Karlsruhe 1928. The hang-glider, a large wing equipped with a passenger harness called „Brigant“/"Bandit" was taken over from the Glider Club Karlruhe, which had just been dissolved. Until 1933 three glider planes were built, named "Zögling"/"Pupil", "Hol’s der Teufel"/"Let the devil get it" and "Karlsruhe". On May 13, 1933, the Akaflieg Karlsruhe was dissolved. The entire equipment was repossessed to the Karlsruhe grouping of the German Aviation Federation.

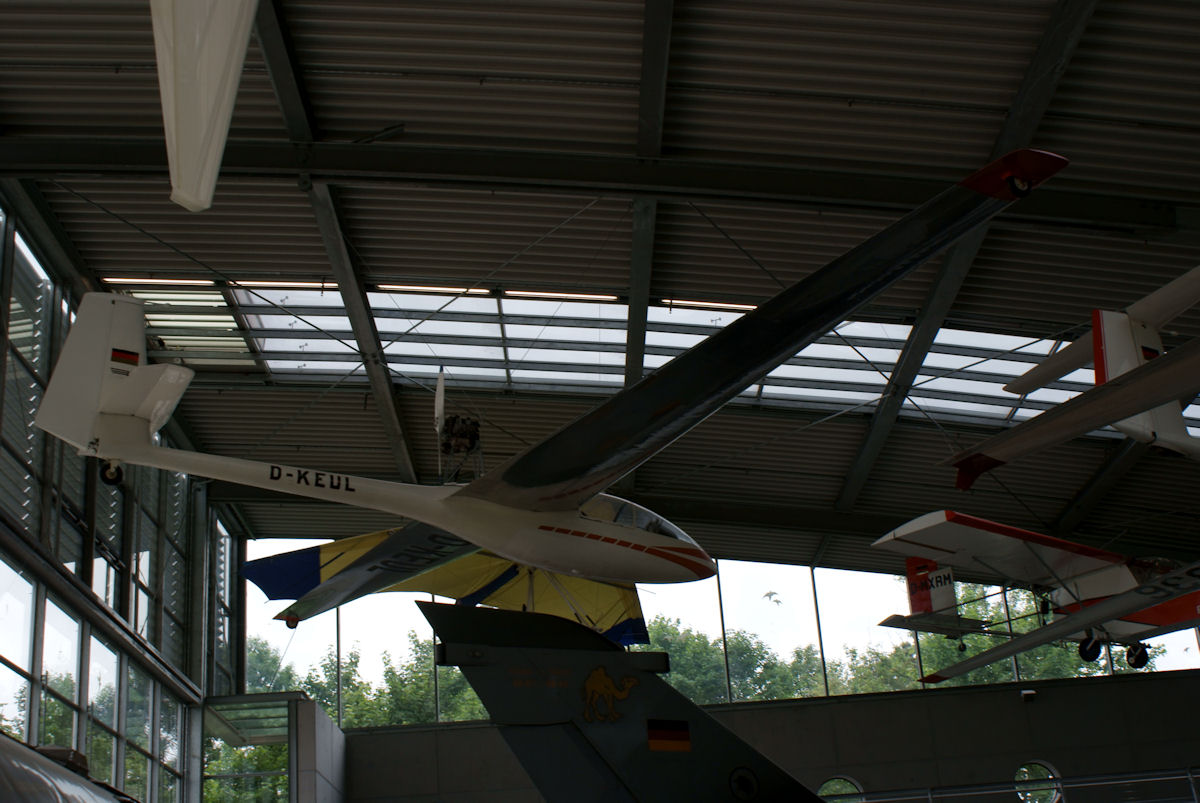
The AK-1 on display at the Deutsches Museum Flugwerft Schleißheim

=== Re-foundation 1951 ===
Glider flying was allowed in Germany on May 22, 1951, on which the new Academic Flying Group of Karlruhe was officially founded. on its first day it 78 members. Thanks to the support of many friends and sponsors, the fleet rapidly expanded. In 1954 a two-seater (model Kranich III) was purchased and got the name „Walter“. In 1955 a new Doppelraab V6 named „Studiosus“ and a motor-plane Bücker 181 "Bestmann" were added to the fleet. A self-built L-Spatz 55 was soon built by the Akaflieg. Mid Sixties work on the project AK-1 started. On January 9, 1971, at 12:31 Central European Time AK-1 was airborne on its own propulsion. The first Prototype of Akaflieg Karlsruhe after the war had proven itself.

=== The Seventies to Eighties ===
Flight trials of the Ak-1 were undertaken in the beginning of the seventies. On October 27, 1973, the assemblee decided to launch a new project. AK-2 should be a powerful motor-glider out of Fiberglas. The project was never finished. In parallel flight data calculators for glider flying had been conceived and constructed. AK-3 became a project and a finished flight computer with electric variometer and glide slope indicator was borne, which was even produced in a small series. AK-3R was completed as approach slope calculator The Ak-4 project was a in cooperation with the Institute for climate research and meteorology at the Karlsruhe Institute of Technology. Climatic data over the Upper Rhine Region was measured with an airplane purpose built with special equipment for in flight data collection.

=== 1980s to 2000s ===
Construction of the AFK-3 launch winch began in 1983 and it went into operation in 1987. In 1984, work began on the AK-5 glider project using fibre composite construction, which made its maiden flight in the early 1990s. The AK-5 was developed into the improved AK-5b in the mid-1990s, which took off for the first time in 1996. At the same time, construction began on the high-performance single-seater AK-8, which made its maiden flight in 2003. These developments marked the transition to modern CFRP construction and improved aerodynamic concepts.

=== Akaflieg Karlsruhe today ===
Akaflieg Karlsruhe has a workshop on the west campus of the Karlsruhe Institute of Technology. The students usually work off the required 300 hours per year there. The main project is the construction of AK-X, flying wing 15m-class glider. The flying activities, with winch hauling, are held on the glider field of Rheinstetten, close to the fair of Karlsruhe since the airport of Karlsruhe-Forchheim was closed.

== Gliders/ Prototypes ==
Aircraft designed and/or built at Akaflieg Karlsruhe include:

Akaflieg Karlsruhe AK-1 "Mischl" self-launching sailplane

Single seat glider: steel tube frame construction with fiberglass hull, 15 m of wingspan fitted with a retractable 4 cylinder, two stroke, 28 HP motor, type F10A from Hirth industries.

Akaflieg Karlsruhe AK-2

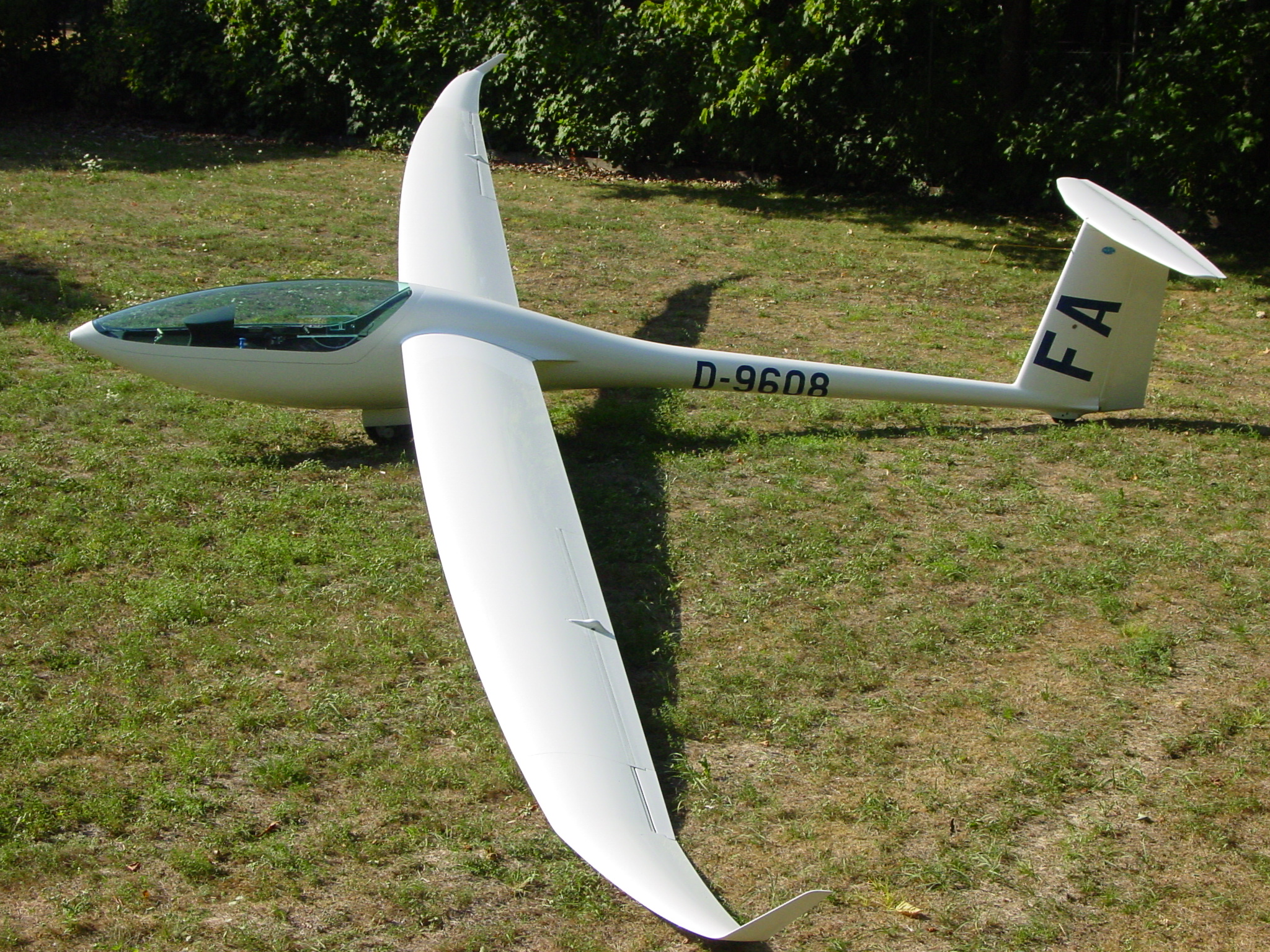
AK-8

An adaptation of a Glasflügel 604 glider with a motor remaining in the hull, which was a novelty in the Seventies. The project was cancelled in favor of AK-5 after 16 years.

AFK-3

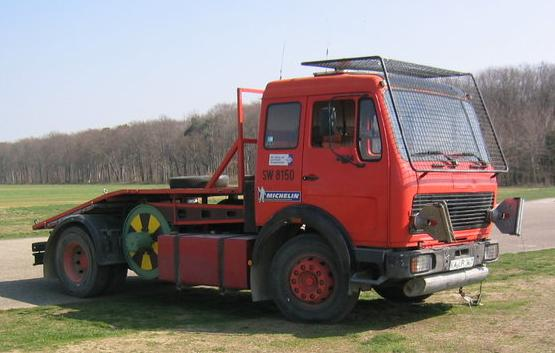
AFK-3 Winch

A single engine Winch was conceived as a novelty, using one engine for driving the truck on the road and hauling the gliders into the air. The winch is hydro-electric and the winch operator uses the passenger seat instead of a separate operator cabin.

Akaflieg Karlsruhe AK-5 "Ardea"

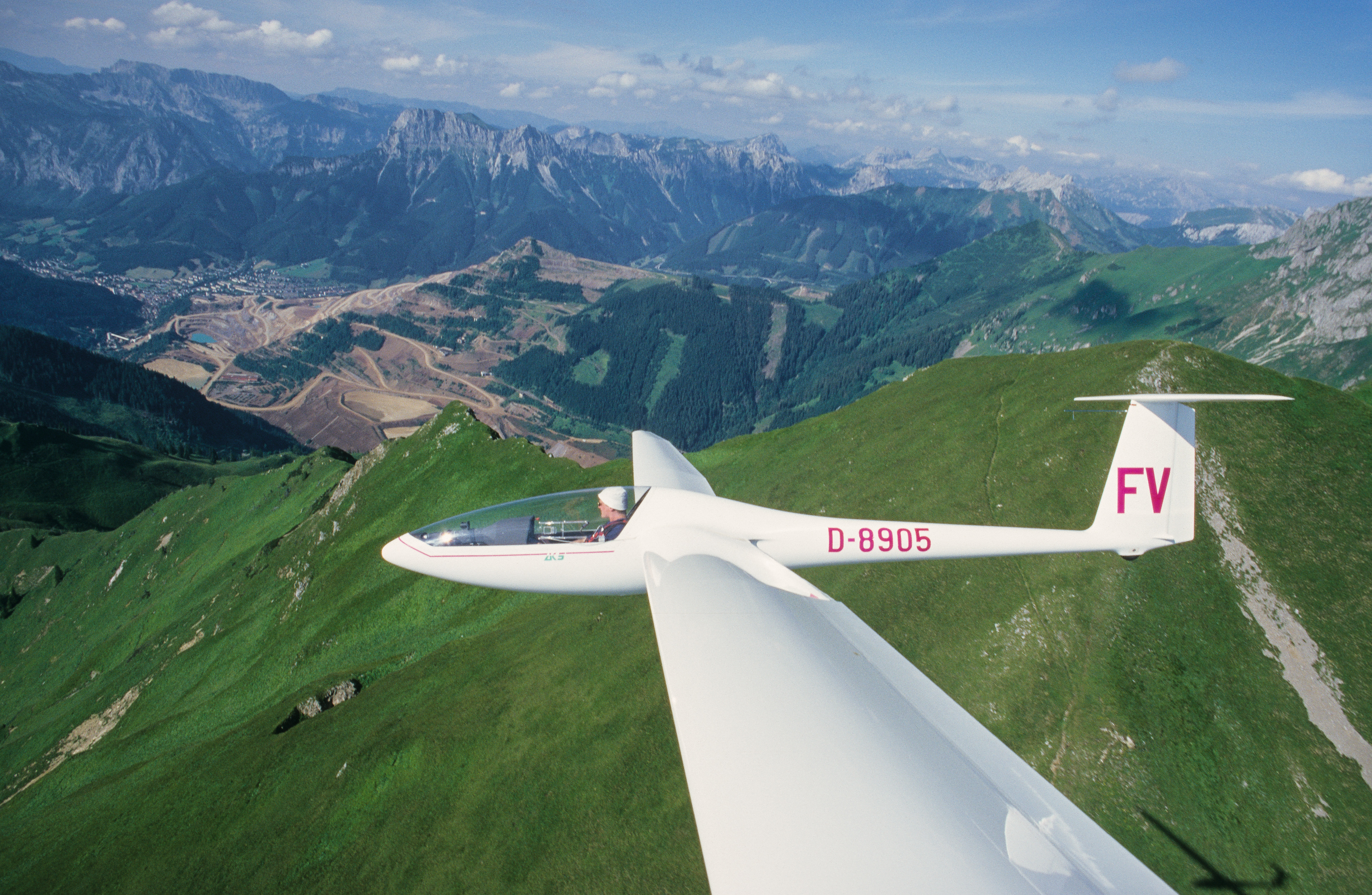
AK-5 in flight

Single-seat standard glider in Fiberglass construction. The hull is a Glasflügel 604. The wings have the shape of a Falcon, a prototype designed by Hansjörg Streifeneder (maiden flight 1981). The aim of the project was to pass on the knowledge and incorporate modern, less expensive construction methods as fiberglass. It can be used in instruction because of easy handling. The first flight was June 1, 1990.

Akaflieg Karlsruhe AK-5b "Otto K.K."

This is a development of AK-5 with "winglets" and rebuild hull interior. New, easier steering mechanics allow student pilots to fly and new materials are lighter. The first flight of AK-5b was 1996.

Akaflieg Karlsruhe AK-8

Single seat 15m standard class glider. New elliptical shaped were built with an aluminum mold. The hull is a DG-600M. Maiden flight of AK-8 was in 2003. After a crash a new left wing was finished in 2009. Improved wings with winglets and improved performance were added in 2014.

Akaflieg Karlsruhe AK-9 or DG-1000J D-KAKJ "Jet"

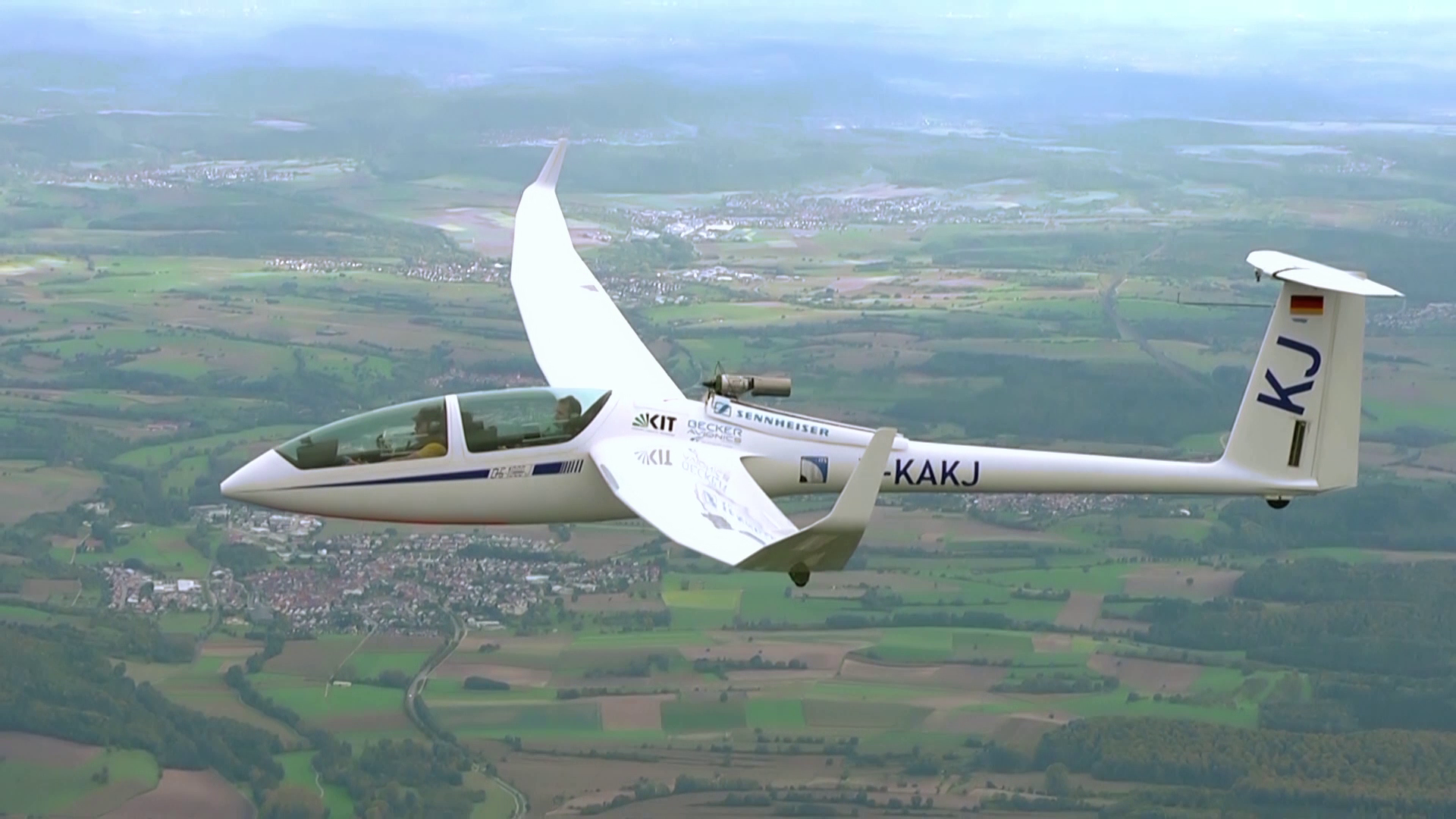
DG1000J in flight

The AK-9 project (also known as DG-1000J) involves research into the installation of a 400N turbine in a two-seater glider. In collaboration with the "Institut für Thermische Strömungsmaschinen" at KIT, the properties of the AMT titanium engine from Dutch manufacturer Draline were investigated. The engine was then integrated into the DG Flugzeugbau DG-1000 of Akaflieg. As it was not possible to comply with the noise limits required for certification, the project was terminated in 2023 with the DG-1000 being converted back into a pure glider.

AK-X

A pure wing glider-prototype with improved handling and performance is currently being built, inspired by the pure-wing conception of the Horten brothers and based on the experience of the SB-13 built by Akaflieg Braunschweig. A 1:2 model flew mid 2015. Work on the crewed prototype has been ongoing since 2016.

AK-11

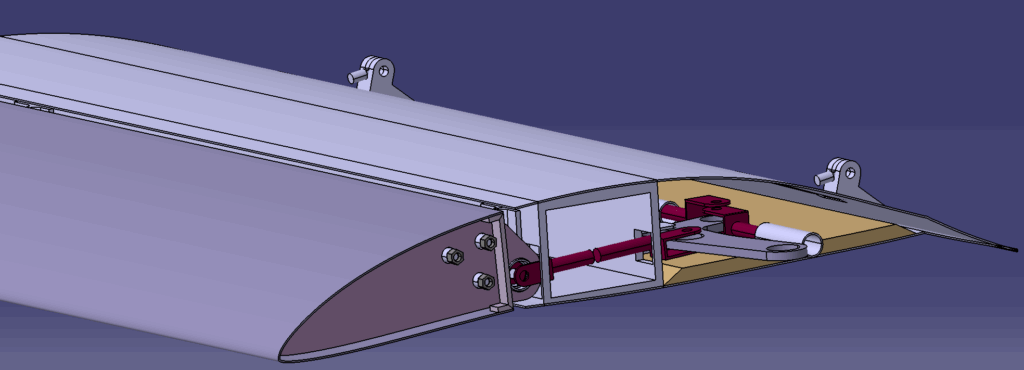
Planned structure of the AK-11 wing

The AK-11 is intended to demonstrate the implementation of a wing concept with a gapless leading edge flap in a two-seater glider. The high lift of the profile when the leading edge flap is extended reduces the required wing area and thus increases the wing loading. A wing loading of up to 70 kg/m² is planned. This should result in improved flight performance, particularly at high pre-flight speeds.

== Bibliography ==
- Frank-Dieter Lemke; Rolf Jacob (June 2010). "Forschen – Bauen – Fliegen Die Akademischen Fliegergruppen (Akaflieg) in Deutschland bis 1945". Flieger Revue extra (in German). 1 (29): 18–31.(in German)
- Alexander Willberg. „AKAFLIEG: Die berühmten Flugzeuge der Akademischen Fliegergruppen“, Motorbuch Stuttgart, 2021, ISBN 978-3-613-04250-6
