= Seafarer 23 =

1970s US recreational keelboat

Development
- Designer: McCurdy & Rhodes
- Location: United States
- Year: 1976
- Builder: Seafarer Yachts
- Role: Cruiser
- Name: Seafarer 23

Boat
- Displacement: 3,500 lb (1,588 kg)
- Draft: 3.25 ft (0.99 m)

Hull
- Type: monohull
- Construction: fiberglass
- LOA: 23.08 ft (7.03 m)
- LWL: 17.92 ft (5.46 m)
- Beam: 7.17 ft (2.19 m)
- Engine: outboard motor

Hull appendages
- Keel: fin keel
- Ballast: 1,060 lb (481 kg)
- Rudder: skeg-mounted rudder

Rig
- Rig type: Bermuda rig
- I foretriangle height: 26.90 ft (8.20 m)
- J foretriangle base: 7.60 ft (2.32 m)
- P mainsail luff: 23.00 ft (7.01 m)
- E mainsail foot: 11.00 ft (3.35 m)

Sails
- Sailplan: fractional rigged sloop masthead sloop
- Mainsail area: 126.50 sq ft (11.752 m^{2})
- Jib/genoa area: 102.22 sq ft (9.497 m^{2})
- Total sail area: 228.72 sq ft (21.249 m^{2})

Racing
- PHRF: 261

The Seafarer 23 is a recreational keelboat built by Seafarer Yachts in Huntington, New York, United States, starting in 1976, but it is now out of production.

The Seafarer 23 is often confused with the 1978 Seafarer 23 Challenger and the 1963 Seafarer 23 Kestrel.

== Design ==
Designed by McCurdy & Rhodes, it is built predominantly of fiberglass, with wood trim. It has a masthead sloop rig, a spooned raked stem, a slightly reverse transom, a skeg-mounted rudder controlled by a tiller and a fixed fin keel. It displaces 3,500 lb (1,588 kg) and carries 1,060 lb (481 kg) of ballast.

The boat has a draft of 3.25 ft (0.99 m) with the standard keel and 2.33 ft (0.71 m) with the optional shoal draft keel.

The boat is normally fitted with a small 3 to 6 hp (2 to 4 kW) outboard motor for docking and maneuvering.

The design has sleeping accommodation for four people, with a double "V"-berth in the bow cabin and two straight settees in the main cabin around a fold-down table, that combine to make a double berth. The galley is located on the starboard side at the companionway ladder. The galley is equipped with a two-burner stove and a sink. There are two locations for the head. In layout "A" it is under the cabin "V"-berth; in layout "B" it is aft of the bow cabin on the port side and is enclosed, but reduces the main cabin space. Cabin headroom is 61 in (155 cm) and the fresh water tank has a capacity of 12 U.S. gallons (45 L; 10.0 imp gal).

The design has a PHRF racing average handicap of 261 and a hull speed of 5.8 kn (10.7 km/h).

== Reception ==
In a 2010 review Steve Henkel wrote, "the Seafarer 23 ... has two underbody options: a 2' 4” shoal keel, or a 3' 3" 'high performance' keel ... In addition, the ... boat has a choice of two layouts ... One, Layout A, is a conventional arrangement for this size boat, with the head in the forward compartment, sandwiched between the two sides of the V-berth. If you have four people sleeping aboard, the two forward passengers will not appreciate the close proximity of any wee-hours visitors to the head from aft. The other choice, Layout B, avoids that problem, but shrinks the elbow room in the main cabin. Best features: Except for the extra-high cockpit coaming, we like the looks of this boat a lot. We think that, at a glance, she looks like a much bigger vessel. Worst features: Normally a skeg-mounted rudder might result in greater ease of steering and handling compared with a freely suspended rudder. However, there are limits to the size of the skeg, which to our eye have been greatly exceeded on this boat. That is, we see too much wetted surface, which will simply slow the boat."
