= Seafarer 23 Challenger =

1970s US recreational keelboat

Development
- Designer: McCurdy & Rhodes
- Location: United States
- Year: 1978
- Builder: Seafarer Yachts
- Role: Cruiser
- Name: Seafarer 23 Challenger

Boat
- Displacement: 2,550 lb (1,157 kg)
- Draft: 3.25 ft (0.99 m)

Hull
- Type: monohull
- Construction: fiberglass
- LOA: 22.67 ft (6.91 m)
- LWL: 18.50 ft (5.64 m)
- Beam: 7.58 ft (2.31 m)
- Engine: outboard motor

Hull appendages
- Keel: fin keel
- Ballast: 1,020 lb (463 kg)
- Rudder: skeg-mounted rudder

Rig
- Rig type: Bermuda rig
- I foretriangle height: 26.00 ft (7.92 m)
- J foretriangle base: 9.25 ft (2.82 m)
- P mainsail luff: 21.75 ft (6.63 m)
- E mainsail foot: 8.00 ft (2.44 m)

Sails
- Sailplan: masthead sloop
- Mainsail area: 87.00 sq ft (8.083 m^{2})
- Jib/genoa area: 120.25 sq ft (11.172 m^{2})
- Total sail area: 207.25 sq ft (19.254 m^{2})

The Seafarer 23 Challenger is a recreational keelboat built by Seafarer Yachts, from 1978 until 1984 in the United States, but it is now out of production.

The design is sometimes confused with the similarly named Seafarer 23 and the Seafarer 23 Kestrel.

== Design ==
Designed by McCurdy & Rhodes, the Seafarer 23 Challenger is built predominantly of fiberglass, with wood trim. It has a masthead sloop rig, a raked stem, a slightly reverse transom, a skeg-mounted rudder controlled by a tiller and a fixed fin keel or optional shoal-draft keel. It displaces 2,550 lb (1,157 kg) and carries 1,020 lb (463 kg) of lead ballast.

The boat has a draft of 3.25 ft (0.99 m) with the standard keel and 2.33 ft (0.71 m) with the optional shoal draft keel. The boat is normally fitted with a small outboard motor for docking and maneuvering.

The design has sleeping accommodation for five people, with a double "V"-berth in the bow cabin, a straight settee in the main cabin on the port side and slides out to form a double berth and a single berth on the starboard side. The galley is located under the companionway ladder. The galley is equipped with a two-burner stove and a sink. The enclosed head is located just aft of the bow cabin on the port side, or optionally in the bow cabin, under the "V"-berth, to give more room in the main cabin.

The design has a hull speed of 5.76 kn (10.67 km/h).
