= Akaflieg Karlsruhe AK-5 =

Single-seat German glider, 1990

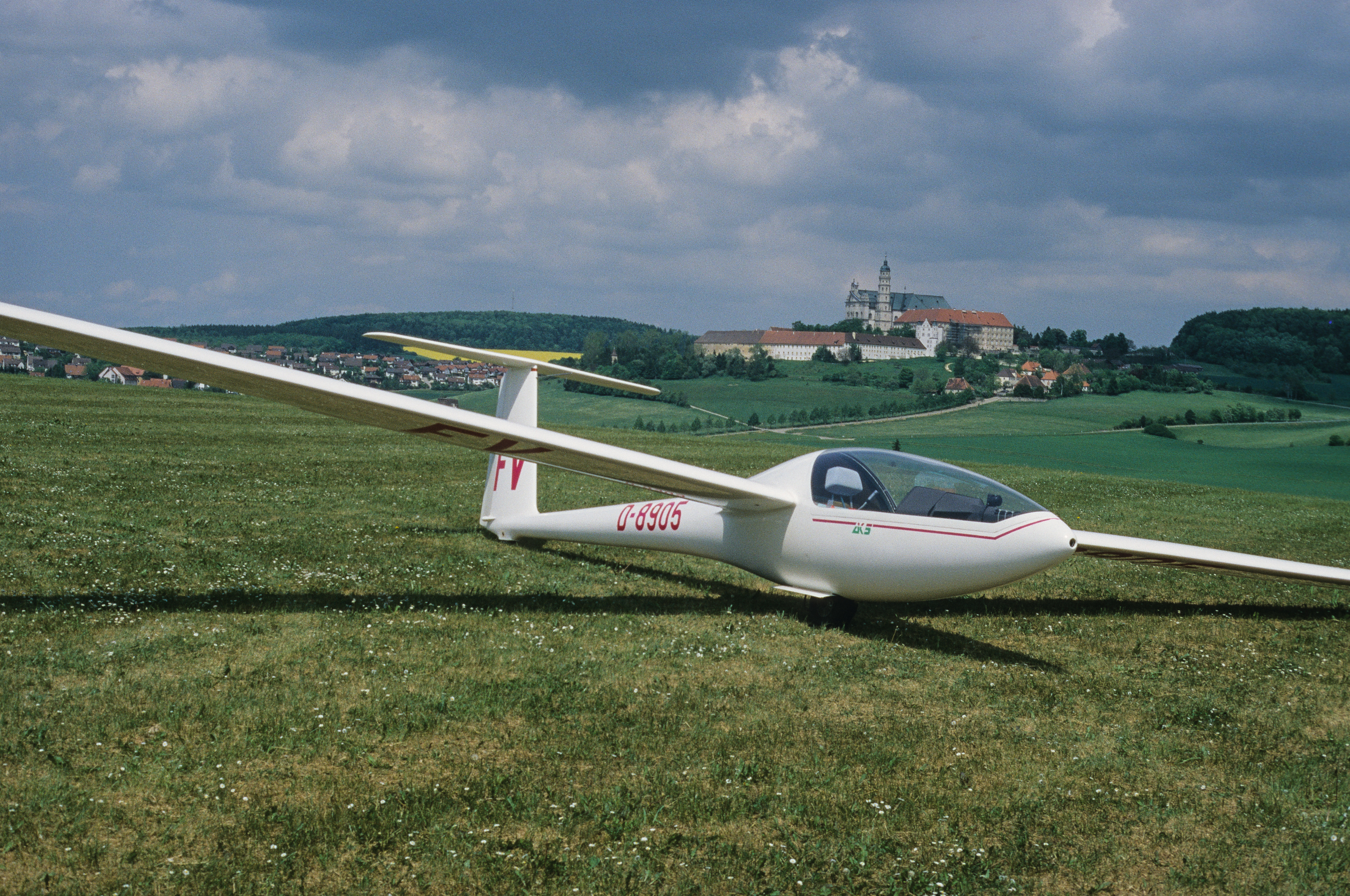
- AK-5 in Neresheim

General information
- Type: Club class sailplane
- National origin: Germany
- Manufacturer: Akaflieg Karlsruhe
- Number built: 1

History
- First flight: June 1990
- Developed into: Akaflieg Karlsruhe AK-5b

The AK-5 is a single-seat club class sailplane designed and built in Germany by members of Akaflieg Karlsruhe.

== Design and development ==
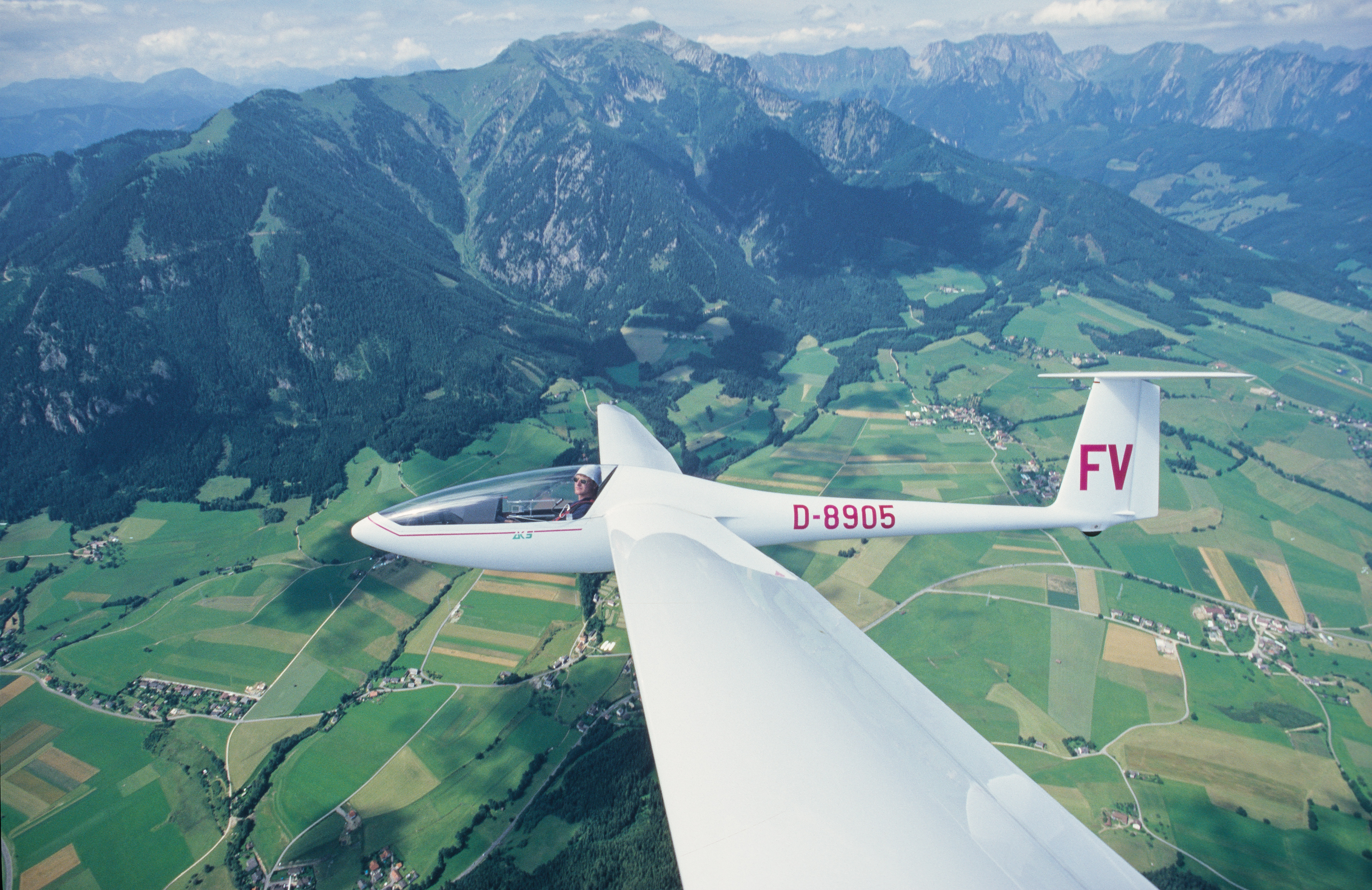
AK-5 in the Alps near Timmersdorf

The forward fuselage of the glider was taken from the Glasflügel 604 and the wings were built to the design of the Streifeneder-Hansen Falcon glider, an experimental prototype designed and built by Hansjörg Streifeneder. The cockpit interior was newly designed including a self-designed and built flight director / variometer system and parallelogram control input system similar to Glasflügel practice.

== Specifications ==
Data from

General characteristics

- Crew: 1
- Length: 6.8 m (22 ft 4 in)
- Wingspan: 15 m (49 ft 3 in)
- Wing area: 10.66 m^{2} (114.7 sq ft)
- Aspect ratio: 21.11
- Airfoil: HQ-21/17.5
- Empty weight: 278 kg (613 lb)
- Gross weight: 485 kg (1,069 lb)

Performance

- Never exceed speed: 270 km/h (170 mph, 150 kn)
- Maximum glide ratio: 39:1 at 105 km/h (65 mph; 57 kn)
- Rate of sink: 0.580 m/s (114.2 ft/min) at 85 km/h (53 mph; 46 kn)
- Wing loading: 45 kg/m^{2} (9.2 lb/sq ft)

Avionics

- self-designed flight director / variometer
