= Siebert Sie-3 =

German single-seat standard class glider, 1968

Sie-3
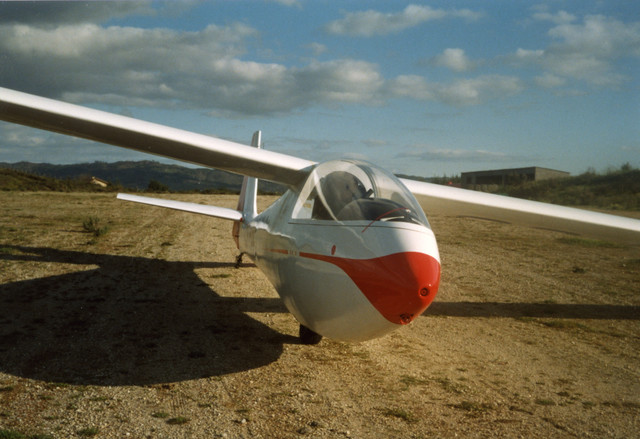

General information
- Type: Standard class club glider
- National origin: Germany
- Manufacturer: Paul Siebert Sport und Segelflugzeugbau, Munster
- Designer: Wilhelm (Peter) Kurten
- Number built: 27

History
- First flight: September 1968

The Siebert Sie-3 is a single-seat Standard class glider designed and produced in Germany in the 1960s for club use.

== Design and development ==
Through the 1960s Paul Siebert's company had built Kaiser Ka 6 gliders under licence. Anticipating the end of this agreement, they began to design a successor with a relatively low cost and simple wooden structure but with performance enhanced by a more modern Wortmann wing profile. The outcome was the Sie 3, which first flew in September 1968.

The Sie-3 has a wooden structure and is largely plywood covered. The high set single spar wings have the same aerodynamic profile throughout, with an unswept centre section of parallel chord and constant thickness over 60% of the span and strongly straight tapered panels outboard. There are aluminium Schempp-Hirth airbrakes near mid-chord on the outer centre section, just behind the spar, and ailerons on the outer panels. The only fabric covering on the wing is over the centre section aft of the spar.

The fuselage is a ply covered semi-monocoque with a short glass fibre nose fairing; aft of the wing it gently tapers towards the tail. The single piece canopy blends into the fuselage profile. The narrow chord swept fin is an integral ply covered part of the fuselage carrying a broad, fabric covered rudder with a near vertical trailing edge that extends to the fuselage keel. A straight tapered, largely fabric covered all moving tailplane with a cut-out for rudder movement is mounted at the base of the fin. The Sie 3 lands on a monowheel well embedded within the fuselage, aided by a sprung tailskid.

The Sie-3 flew for the first time in September 1968, piloted by its designer. Its performance was similar to contemporary wooden gliders.

== Operational history ==
Siebert manufactured 27 Sie 3s in the four years after it received type approval in January 1972. Some were built by amateurs from kits. In 2010 twelve remained on the civil registers of European countries, seven in Germany, two in Denmark and one each in the Netherlands, Belgium and Portugal. In addition, there is one in the United States.

== Specifications ==
Data from Gliders and Sailplanes of the world

General characteristics

- Crew: One
- Length: 6.71 m (22 ft 0 in) . Simons gives the length as 6.966 m
- Wingspan: 15.00 m (49 ft 3 in)
- Height: 1.19 m (3 ft 11 in)
- Wing area: 11.840 m^{2} (127.44 sq ft)
- Aspect ratio: 19.5
- Airfoil: Wortmann FX61-184
- Empty weight: 212 kg (467 lb)
- Gross weight: 340 kg (750 lb)

Performance

- Maximum speed: 200 km/h (124 mph, 108 kn) in smooth air
- Maximum glide ratio: best 34.3:1 at 90 km/h; 49 kn (56 mph)
- Rate of sink: 0.68 m/s (134 ft/min) minimum, at 78 km/h; 42 kn (48.5 mph)
- Wing loading: 27.7 kg/m^{2} (5.7 lb/sq ft)
