= LCF II =

German single-seat glider, 1975

General information
- Type: Single seat Club Class training glider
- National origin: Germany
- Designer: Luftsportclub der Zeppelinstadt Friedrichshafen
- Number built: 1

History
- First flight: 22 March 1975

The LCF II is a single seat Club Class glider, designed and built in the 1970s by German glider club members and intended to be suitable for training, competition and in particular aerobatics. Only one was completed.

== Design and development ==
Design of the LCF II began in 1971, at the beginning of a decade that saw increasing interest in aerobatic glider flight. The intention was to produce a general purpose club glider, capable of being used as a trainer or in standard gliding competitions but also able to take the stresses involved in aerobatics. The manoeuvrability required for the latter requires the ability to fly slowly and to rotate rapidly, calling for relatively short spans. The LCF II has a span of 13 m (42 ft 8 in).

The straight tapered, square tipped wings of the LCF II are mounted at shoulder height and built around a single wooden spar. The ribs are formed from polyvinyl chloride rigid foam and the wings plywood covered. The wing mounts Schempp-Hirth type airbrakes, which extend from the upper surfaces.

The fuselage of the LCF II is built around a steel tube structure, covered by glassfibre in front and fabric covered aft, producing a tapering hexagonal cross section from the leading edge rearwards. A long, single piece canopy extends back almost to the leading edge, where it blends smoothly into the upper fuselage line. At the rear the tailplane is attached to the top of the fuselage; the vertical surfaces are straight tapered and square tipped. All rear surfaces are foam filled and ply covered. The LFC II has a fixed monowheel undercarriage, partly recessed into the fuselage, and a tailwheel.

It took five air club members about 4,000 hours to build the LCF II, which made its first flight on 22 March 1975.

== Operational history ==
In 1975 the LCF II won first prize at the annual meeting of the Oskar-Ursinus-Vereinigung, the equivalent of the Experimental Aircraft Association. Plans were put in place for Scheibe Flugzeugbau to build the LCF II, but no orders were forthcoming and no Scheibe aircraft were constructed. It was intended that the LCF II should also be built by amateurs but it seems that, in the end, the prototype was only example of its type. This aircraft, registered D-6466, remained on the German civil register in 2010, listed as a Scheibe LCF II.

A second glider was built by Klaus Roth which was finished in 2012. German call sign is D-1622. Serial number: 002

== Specifications ==
Data from Gliders and Sailplanes of the World

General characteristics

- Crew: One
- Length: 6.35 m (20 ft 10 in)
- Wingspan: 13.00 m (42 ft 8 in)
- Height: 0.90 m (2 ft 11 in)
- Wing area: 10.00 m^{2} (107.6 sq ft)
- Aspect ratio: 16.9
- Airfoil: S 01
- Empty weight: 190 kg (419 lb)
- Max takeoff weight: 300 kg (661 lb)

Performance

- Maximum speed: 280 km/h (174 mph, 151 kn)
- g limits: +7.0/-4.4
- Maximum glide ratio: 30:1 best, at 85 km/h; 46 kn (53 mph)
- Rate of sink: 0.70 m/s (138 ft/min) minimum at 68 km/h; 37 kn (42.5 mph)
