= Akaflieg Karlsruhe AK-5b =

Single-seat German glider, 1996

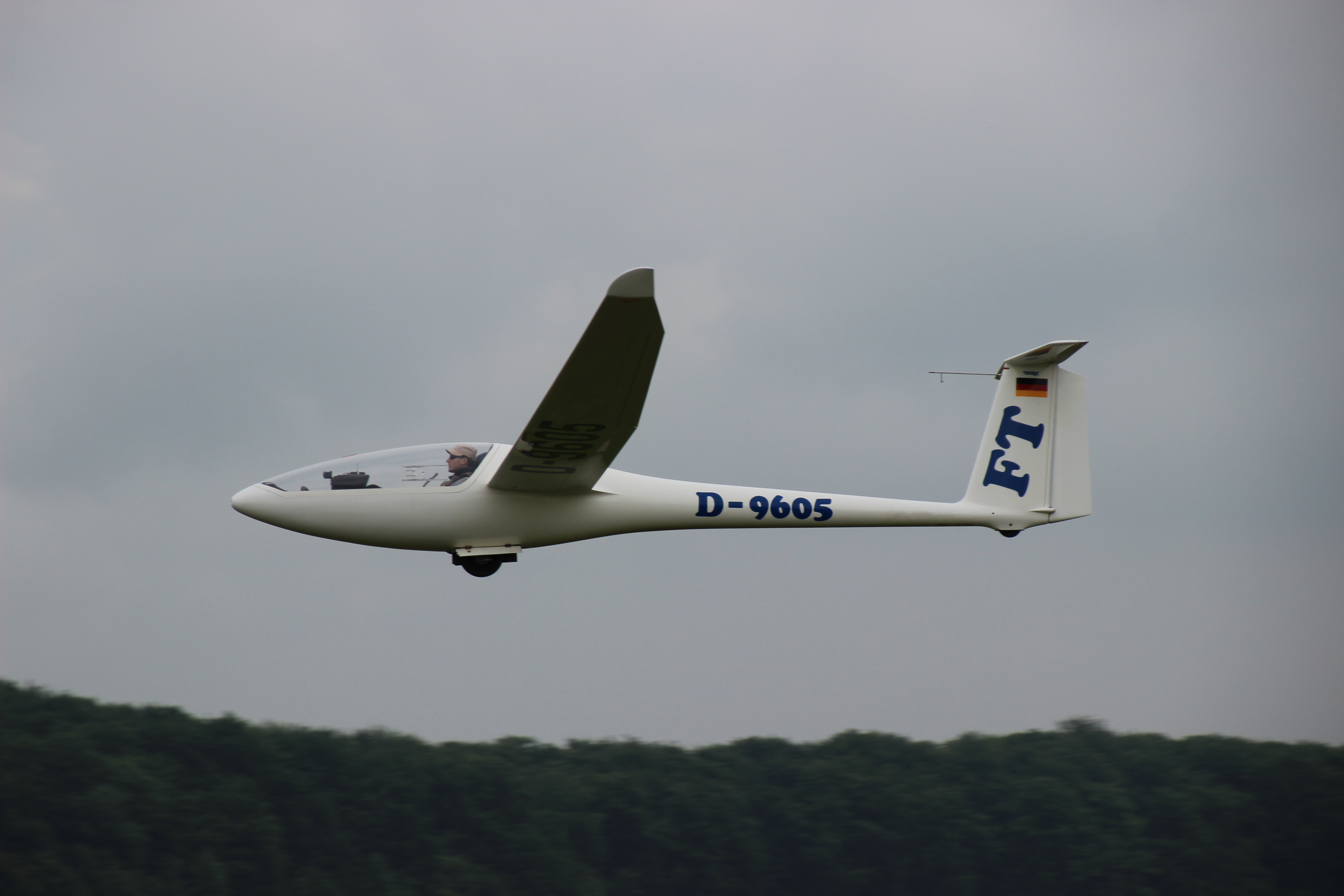
- AK-5b landing in Grabenstetten

General information
- Type: Club-Class glider
- National origin: Germany
- Manufacturer: Akaflieg Karlsruhe
- Number built: 1

History
- First flight: May 1996
- Developed from: Akaflieg Karlsruhe AK-5

The Akaflieg Karlsruhe AK-5b is a single-seat club class glider designed and built in Germany by members of Akaflieg Karlsruhe.

== Design and development ==
Poor handling characteristics of the AK5 prompted Akaflieg Karlsruhe to design a successor with improved handling capable of being used as a first single-seater at the Akaflieg Karlsruhe gliding club. During development of the AK-5b it was decided to make changes to the construction by using carbon-fibre, aramid fibres and glass-fibre. As part of the re-design, a new cockpit was designed with new crash-worthy canopy, equipped with a new opening and emergency release mechanisms

== Specification (AK-5b) ==
Data from

General characteristics

- Crew: 1
- Wingspan: 15 m (49 ft 3 in)
- Wing area: 10.66 m^{2} (114.7 sq ft)
- Aspect ratio: 21.11
- Airfoil: HQ-21/17,5
- Empty weight: 255 kg (562 lb)
- Gross weight: 450 kg (992 lb)

Performance

- Never exceed speed: 270 km/h (170 mph, 150 kn)
- Maximum glide ratio: 39:1 at 105 km/h (65 mph; 57 kn)
- Rate of sink: 0.58 m/s (114 ft/min) at 85 km/h (53 mph; 46 kn)
- Wing loading: 42.2 kg/m^{2} (8.6 lb/sq ft)
