= Der Dessauer =

German single-seat glider, 1923

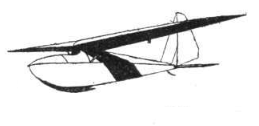

General information
- Type: Single seat glider
- National origin: Germany
- Manufacturer: Flugtechnischer Verein, Dessau
- Designer: Ludwig Hoffmann
- Number built: 1

History
- First flight: 1923

The Der Dessauer, later Der alte Dessauer, was a German single-seat glider built in the early 1920s. It took part in all the Rhön gliding contests on the Wasserkuppe between 1923 and 1928, flew in the Alps, and made a long-duration flight along the German sea shore.

== Design and development ==
Around 1923, Ludwig Hoffmann was a Junkers employee and co-founder of the Flugtechnische Verein Dessau (Flight Technical Association Dessau). He had already had experience in glider design at Akaflieg Darmstadt with the Akaflieg Darmstadt D-6 Geheimrat. The Der Dessauer was recognisable as a descendant of that glider.

The Der Dessauer was a monoplane with a thick section, two-part, high wing, connected to the fuselage by a single, short, steep, tubular Dural lift strut from the upper fuselage longeron to the single wing spar on each side at about 15% of the span. These struts were unusual in incorporating rubber shock absorbers which allowed a compression of 5 mm (0.2 in) at landings, when the downward inertial forces were greatest. They were rigid under lifting loads. Forward of the spar the wing was plywood skinned around the leading edge, forming a torsion resistant D-box, and behind it the wing was fabric-covered with wire defining the trailing edge. A rectangular plan centre section filled about half the span; outboard, the leading edge was slightly swept, leading to straight, oblique wing tips. The trailing edges of these outer panels carried obliquely mounted differential ailerons which broadened to the tips.

The Der Dessauers fuselage was wood-framed and skinned with plywood. There were no internal cross frames; instead the ply skin carried the stresses. From the nose to the rear of the open cockpit, at about one third of the chord of the wing, the fuselage section was a flat-topped hexagon. To the rear, the section became a pentagon with the wing upon the uppermost vertex, overhanging the pilot. At the tail it tapered to a horizontal wedge where the Der Dessauers all-moving, single-piece tailplane was mounted at a hinge near its mid-chord. The rather angular rudder was also hinged at the extreme tail, behind a triangular fin, and was cut away on its underside to allow tailplane movement. The tail surfaces were wood framed like the wings with the forward part of the tailplane and the whole fin ply covered. The rest of the tail surface area was fabric-covered; like the wing, their trailing edges were wire-defined. The Der Dessauer landed on a single skid with a pneumatic shock absorber, assisted by a spring tail skid.

== Operational history ==
The Der Dessauer was a competitor at the 1923 Rhön (Wasserkuppe) competition; though it did not win it, pilot Otto Thomsen used its manoeuvrability, particularly in circling, to advantage. On the last day of the contest, 30 August, a crowd of about 30,000 people gathered to observe the dedication of a memorial to those glider pilots who had died on the Wasserkuppe. Despite very gusty conditions, several gliders flew and some crashed; amongst these was Der Dessauer. Violent wing oscillations set in and although Thomsen was able to bring the aircraft down before the wings broke away, the impact very seriously damaged it. The accident was blamed upon resonances caused by the elastic wing struts. Thomsen was not seriously hurt.

Despite the damage, the Der Dessauer was rebuilt by a small group at the Frederick Polytechnic at Cöthen, not far from Dessau, this time with standard rigid lift struts, and re-christened Der Alte Dessauer. It flew at the 1924 Rhön event, though not until 26 August, near the end of the competition. Whilst on the Wasserkuppe it was flown by the Akaflieg Darmstadt student Otto Fuchs (the 1924 Rhön winner) to an altitude of 250 m (820 ft) and covered 11 km (7 mi). It then went to a competition on Monte Sisemol near Asiago and Fuchs brought it home as the only glider undamaged by the rough terrain. In February, Fuchs and Der Alte Dessauer were rope-launched from a snow and ice-covered site near the Zugspitze, going on over Garmisch-Partenkirchen to much applause. Later that year he flew it for 7.75 hours at a competition at Rossitten.

It continued to fly competitively for three more years, attending all the Rhön events from 1925 to 1928, frequently flown by Akaflieg Dessau students, one of whom irreparably damaged it there in 1928.

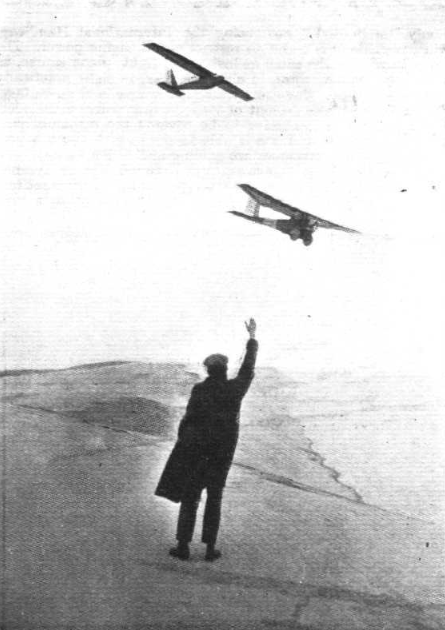
Der Dessauer over Rossitten (upper aircraft)

== Specifications ==
Data from Historische Deutsche Flugzeug p.23. Weights and performance figures are approximate

General characteristics

- Crew: One
- Length: 6.10 m (20 ft 0 in)
- Wingspan: 12.80 m (42 ft 0 in)
- Height: 1.35 m (4 ft 5 in)
- Wing area: 15.5 m^{2} (167 sq ft)
- Aspect ratio: 10.57
- Airfoil: Göttingen 289
- Empty weight: 100 kg (220 lb)
- Gross weight: 176 kg (388 lb)
- Wing loading: 11.5 kg/m^{2} (2.4 lb/sq ft)

Performance

- Maximum speed: 140 km/h (87 mph, 76 kn)
- Minimum control speed: 40 km/h (25 mph, 22 kn)
- Maximum glide ratio: best, 1:19
- Rate of sink: 0.6 m/s (120 ft/min)

== See also ==
- List of gliders
