= DDR =

DDR or ddr may refer to:

== Arts and media ==
- Dance Dance Revolution, a musical video game series produced by Konami
- Dolores del Río, Mexican actress
- Dr Disrespect, an American live streamer (born 1982)

== Transport infrastructure ==
- Dadar railway station, Mumbai, India (station code "DDR")
- Dordrecht railway station, Dordrecht, the Netherlands (station code "Ddr")
- Shigatse Tingri Airport, Tibet, China (IATA airport code DDR)

== Science and technology ==
- DASD Dump Restore, an IBM utility
- DNA-damage response, for repairing damaged DNA
- Double data rate, a data transfer strategy of a computer bus
- DDR SDRAM, a computer memory standard that uses double-data-rate transfers

== Other uses ==
- Deutsche Demokratische Republik, 'German Democratic Republic', official name of the former East Germany (1949–1990)
- Dhudhuroa language (ISO 639-3 code "ddr")
- Disarmament, demobilization and reintegration, a component of peace processes
- DDr., title for a double doctorate in Germany
- Developers Diversified Reality and DDR Corp., former names for SITE Centers Corp
