= Akaflieg Karlsruhe AK-8 =

Single-seat German glider, 2003

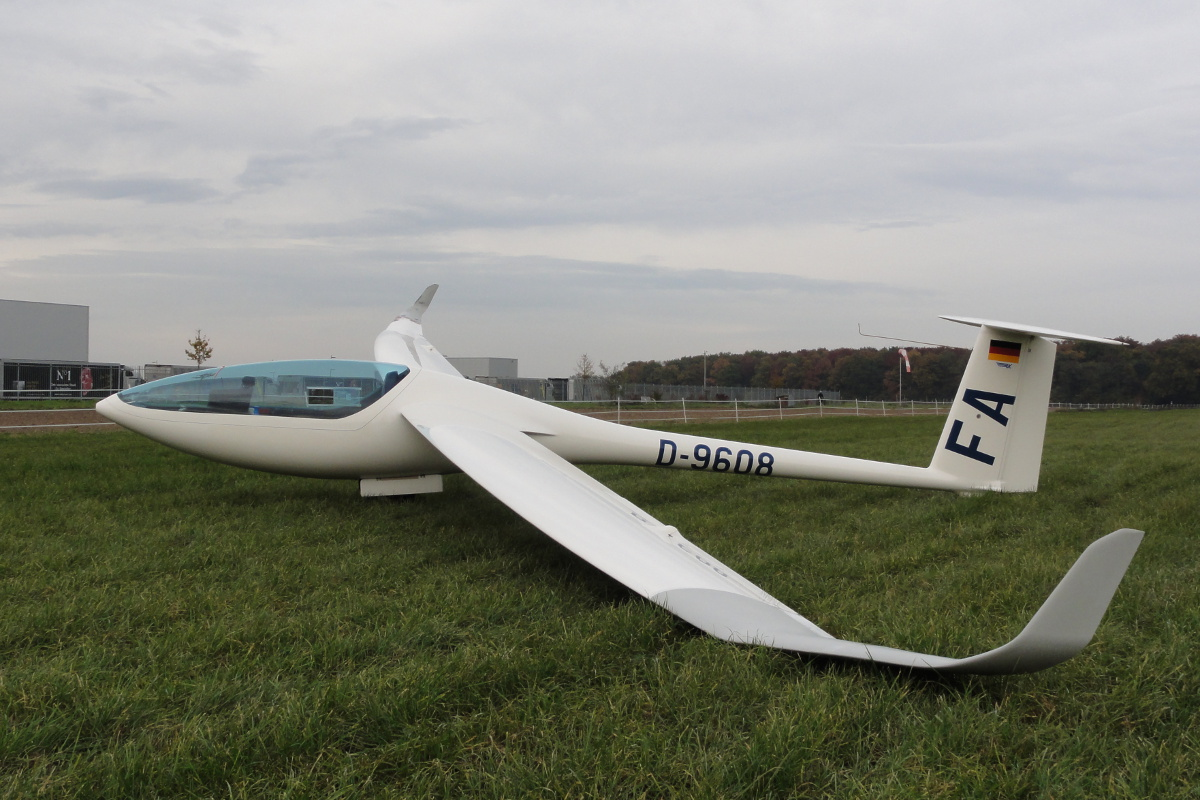
- the AK-8

General information
- Type: Standard-class glider
- National origin: Germany
- Manufacturer: Akaflieg Karlsruhe
- Number built: 1

History
- First flight: August 2003

The AK-8 is a single-seat FAI-Standard Class sailplane, designed and built in Germany by members of Akaflieg Karlsruhe which can be distinguished by its elliptical leading edge.

== Design and development ==
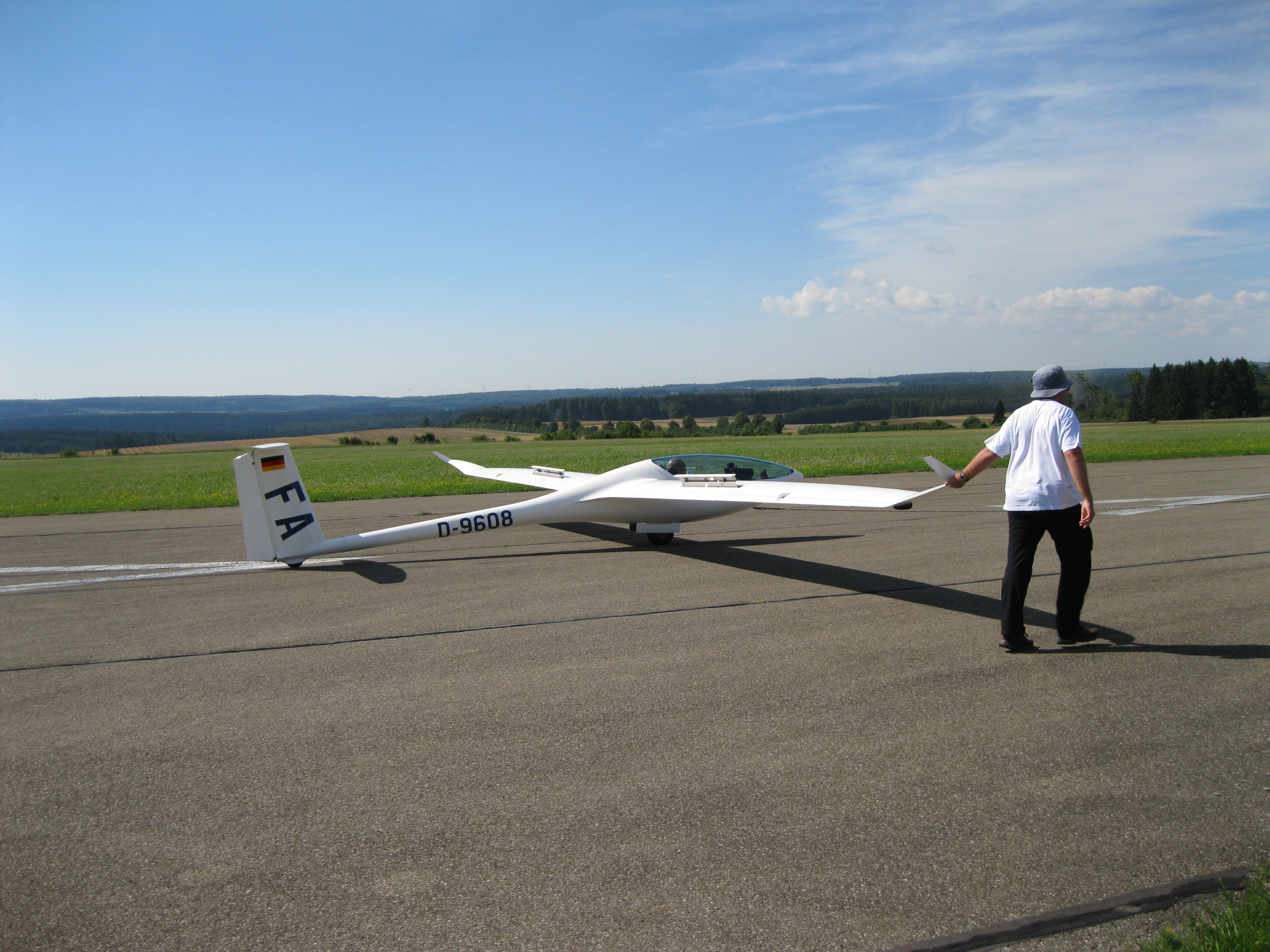
The AK-8 rolling for take-off at Aalen-Elchingen

Made of synthetic materials, such as aramid fibre, carbon fibre and glass-fibre with cast aluminium alloy ribs, the AK-8 wing features an elliptical leading edge. The fuselage is derived from that of the DG-600M.

The first flight of the AK-8 took place in 2003, but a field landing accident caused severe damage to the left wing. After the left wing was rebuilt, the AK-8 flew again in 2009. In 2014 new outer wings with winglets were built to improve the flying characteristic.

== Specifications ==
General characteristics

- Length: 6.82 m (22 ft 5 in)
- Wingspan: 15 m (49 ft 3 in)
- Wing area: 9.75 m^{2} (104.9 sq ft)
- Empty weight: 232.8 kg (513 lb)
- Gross weight: 450 kg (992 lb)

Performance

- Never exceed speed: 270 km/h (170 mph, 150 kn)

== See also ==
- List of gliders
