= Seafarer 23 Kestrel =

1960s Dutch recreational keelboat

Seafarer 23 Kestrel Cruise
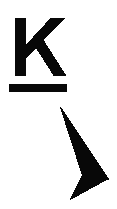

Development
- Designer: Sparkman & Stephens
- Location: United States
- Year: 1963
- Builders: De Vries Lentsch; Seafarer Yachts
- Role: Day sailer-cruiser

Boat
- Displacement: 3,700 lb (1,678 kg)
- Draft: 5.00 ft (1.52 m) with centerboard down

Hull
- Type: monohull
- Construction: fiberglass
- LOA: 23.08 ft (7.03 m)
- LWL: 16.50 ft (5.03 m)
- Beam: 7.00 ft (2.13 m)
- Engine: outboard motor

Hull appendages
- Keel: stub long keel with centerboard
- Ballast: 1,400 lb (635 kg)
- Rudder: keel-mounted rudder

Rig
- Rig type: Bermuda rig
- I foretriangle height: 26.83 ft (8.18 m)
- J foretriangle base: 7.61 ft (2.32 m)
- P mainsail luff: 23.08 ft (7.03 m)
- E mainsail foot: 11.00 ft (3.35 m)

Sails
- Sailplan: masthead sloop
- Mainsail area: 126.94 sq ft (11.793 m^{2})
- Jib/genoa area: 102.09 sq ft (9.484 m^{2})
- Total sail area: 229.03 sq ft (21.278 m^{2})

Racing
- PHRF: 270

The Seafarer 23 Kestrel is a recreational keelboat built by De Vries Lentsch in Amsterdam, starting in 1963 and imported into the United States by Seafarer Fiberglass Yachts of New York City. Seafarer later produced the boat in its own plant, a converted supermarket in Huntington, New York, but it is now out of production.

It is often confused with the 1978 Seafarer 23 Challenger and the 1976 Seafarer 23.

== Design ==
Designed by Sparkman & Stephens, the Seafarer 23 Kestrel is built predominantly of fiberglass, with wood trim. It has a masthead sloop rig; a spooned, raked stem; a raised counter, angled transom; a keel-mounted rudder controlled by a tiller and a fixed, stub, long keel, with a retractable centerboard. It displaces 3,700 lb (1,678 kg) and carries 1,400 lb (635 kg) of iron ballast.

The boat has a draft of 5.00 ft (1.52 m) with the centerboard extended and 2.33 ft (0.71 m) with it retracted, allowing operation in shallow water, or ground transportation on a trailer.

The boat is normally fitted with a small 3 to 6 hp (2 to 4 kW) well-mounted outboard motor for docking and maneuvering. The transom lazarette well is large enough to allow the motor to be tilted to reduce drag while sailing.

The Kestrel was offered in a number of different deck and interior layouts. Initially there were two deck patterns for a daysailer and a cruiser, but later an intermediate deck was added. There were also six interior plans, including a bare one for owner completion. Model marketing names similarly varied, including Seafarer 23 Kestrel, Seafarer Kestrel 23, Kestrel 23 and Kestrel 22. Model configuration names included Cruiser, Overnighter, Catalina, Nassau, Nantucket, Monhegan and Olympic. In 1969 all the models were sold as the Seafarer Sail 'n Trailer 23.

The cruiser cabin design typically has sleeping accommodation for four people, with a double "V"-berth in the bow cabin and two straight settee berths in the main cabin. The galley is on both sides, aft of the bow cabin and is equipped with stove to port and a sink to starboard. The head is located centered in the bow cabin under the "V"-berth. Cabin headroom is 57 in (145 cm) and the fresh water tank has a capacity of 15 U.S. gallons (57 L; 12 imp gal).

The design has a PHRF racing average handicap of 270 and a hull speed of 5.5 kn (10.2 km/h).

== Reception ==
In a 2010 review Steve Henkel wrote, "the grace of the classic Sparkman & Stephens hull form will appeal to traditional sailors."
