= Akaflieg Karlsruhe AK-1 Mischl =

German single-seat motor glider, 1971

AK-1 Mischl
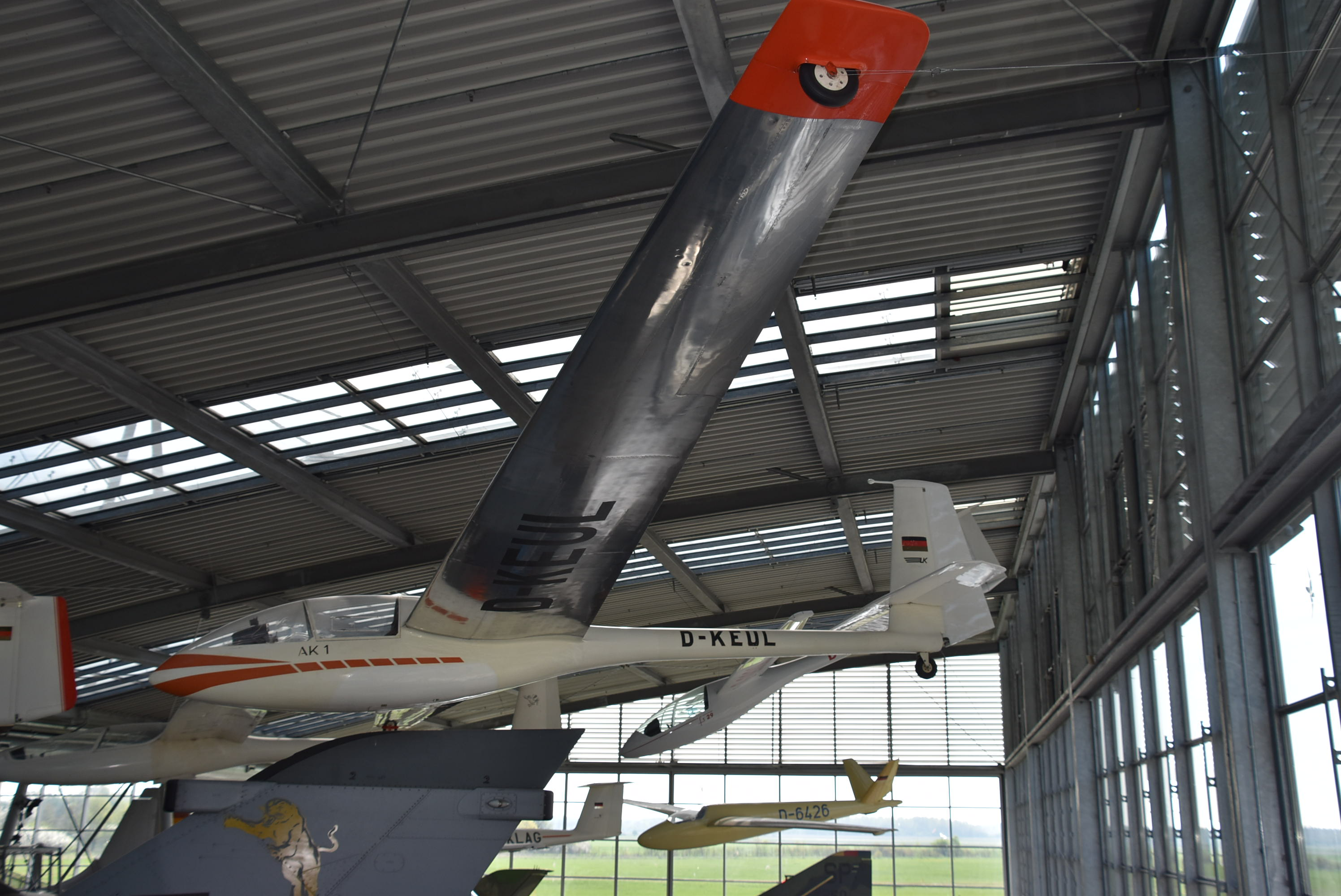

General information
- Type: Motorglider
- National origin: Germany
- Manufacturer: Akaflieg Karlsruhe
- Number built: 1

History
- First flight: 9 January 1971

The Akaflieg Karlsruhe AK-1 Mischl is a Motor-glider designed and built in Germany and first flown on 9 January 1971.

== Specifications ==
Data from

General characteristics

- Crew: 1
- Length: 7.20 m (23 ft 7 in)
- Wingspan: 15 m (49 ft 3 in)
- Wing area: 14.36 m^{2} (154.6 sq ft)
- Aspect ratio: 15.7
- Empty weight: 323.8 kg (714 lb)
- Max takeoff weight: 420 kg (926 lb)
- Maximum speed: 180 km/h (110 mph, 97 kn)
