= Lommatzsch FES-530 Lehrmeister =

FES-530 Lehrmeister
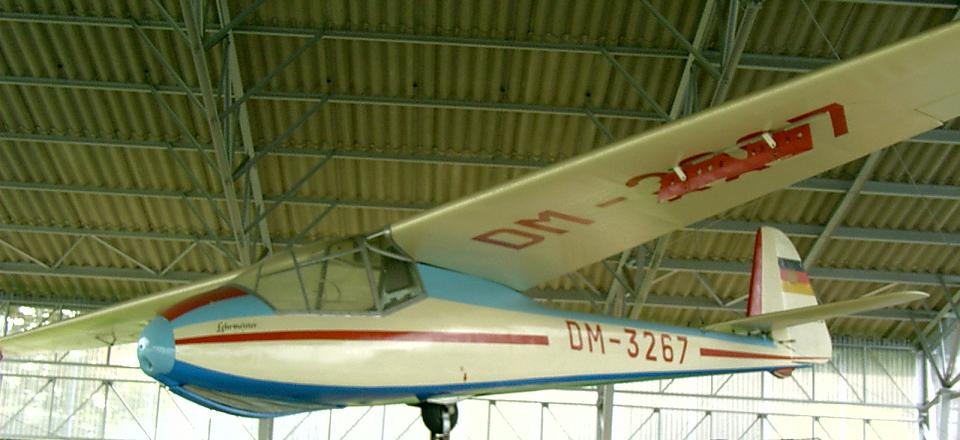
- Lehrmeister II, spoilers extended

General information
- Type: Two seat trainer glider
- National origin: German Democratic Republic
- Manufacturer: VEB Apparatebau Lommatzsch
- Designer: Wilhelm Zimmermann, Hans Wegerich and Hans Hartung
- Number built: 323

History
- First flight: June 1954

The Lommatzsch FES-530 Lehrmeister is a two-seat trainer glider that was built in the German Democratic Republic in the 1950s. Over 300 were built, with a mixture of 17 m and 15 m spans.

== Design and development ==
The Lommatzsch factory of the Volkseigener Betrieb Flugzeug (Association of the People's Aircraft Enterprises) was responsible for glider design and production in the DDR. The FES-530 was principally designed by Wilhelm Zimmermann, Hans Wegerich and Hans Hartung. It has a wooden structure throughout. The two piece wings have single spars, plywood covered torsion box leading edges and fabric covering over the remaining two thirds of wing surface, including the ailerons. They are high mounted with 2° of dihedral and 2.3° of washout. On the original model 17 m (55 ft 9 in) span wings are braced on each side with a single strut to the lower fuselage. On all variants the wings are straight tapered in plan, mostly on the trailing edge and resulting in 0.46° sweepback at one quarter chord, and with only slightly rounded tips. There are no flaps but Schempp-Hirth style airbrakes extend above and below the wing just behind the spar at about mid-span.

The Lehrmeister's fuselage is a ply covered monocoque which tapers slightly to the rear. Both fin and tailplane are also ply covered and the fin is an integral part of the fuselage; the tailplane is mounted well forward of the fin on the upper fuselage. The rear control surfaces are fabric covered; the rudder, which extends downwards almost to the keel, moves in a gap between the elevators. There is a trim tab on the port elevator. Student and instructor sit in tandem, below and ahead of the wing leading edge, under multi-part, sideways opening glazing. Below them there is a monowheel, fixed but sprung and fitted with brakes, assisted by a fixed rubber mounted skid and a small tail bumper.

The FES-530 Lehrmeister flew for the first time in June 1954; in November 1955 it was approved as semi-aerobatic, cleared for spinning and also cloud flying. It went into production and 100 were built.

The variants which followed in 1959 differed primarily in having an unbraced, cantilever wing, similar in plan and section to that of the initial model but available with two spans, either the 17 m wing of the FES-530 or a shorter span 15 m (49 ft 3 in) one. The corresponding wing areas are 19.00 m^{2} (205 sq ft) and 17.93 m^{2} (193 sq ft). These two models are known as the FES-530/I or Lehrmeister I and FES-530/II or Lehrmeister II respectively. Removal of the external bracing slightly improved the 530/I's performance over that of the equal span 530, increasing the glide ratio from 24:1 to 26:1 and decreasing the minimum sink rate from 0.85 m/s to 0.80 m/s. The decrease of aspect ratio (12.54 from 15.20) caused by the shorter span unsurprisingly lowered the performance of the 530/II with respect to that of the 530/I, reducing the glide ratio to 23:1 from 26:1 and increasing the sink speed to 0.95 m/s from 0.80 m/s. Even so, the Lehrmeister was primarily a training glider rather than a competition machine and more 530/IIs were built (101) than 530/Is.

== Operational history ==
Eight Lehrmeisters remain on the Danish and Austrian civil registers in 2010. One Lehrmeister was restored near Pirna/Germany and was allowed to have its former GDR registration on.

== Aircraft on display ==
Information from Ogden and

- Interessengemeinschaft Ju 52, Springe: DM-3324 Lehrmeister II
- Norsk Luftfartsmuseum, Bodø: LN-GGV Lehrmeister II
- Segelflugmuseum Wasserkuppe, Wasserkuppe: DM-3308 Lehrmeister II
- (still in storage): Stiftung Deutsches Technikmuseum, Berlin: OY-YAP Lehrmeister I

== Variants ==
Data from The World's Sailplanes and Segelflugzeuge. Production numbers from Lommatzsch FES-530.

FES-530 Lehrmeister
Original strut braced, 17 m (55 ft 9 in) span wing. First flight June 1954. 100 built.
FES-530 Lehrmeister I
Cantilever, 17.0 m span wing. 22 built.
FES-530 Lehrmeister II
Cantilever, 15 m (49 ft 3 in) span wing. First flight 27 February 1959. 101 built.

== Specifications (Lehrmeister II) ==
Data from The World's Sailplanes

General characteristics

- Crew: 2
- Wingspan: 15.00 m (49 ft 3 in)
- Height: 2.12 m (6 ft 11 in)
- Wing area: 17.93 m^{2} (193.0 sq ft)
- Aspect ratio: 12.54
- Airfoil: Göttingen 549 at root and mid-span, Göttingen 676 at tip
- Empty weight: 266.8 kg (588 lb) equipped
- Gross weight: 470 kg (1,036 lb)

Performance

- Stall speed: 50 km/h (31 mph, 27 kn)
- Never exceed speed: 200 km/h (120 mph, 110 kn)
- Rough air speed max: 130 km/h (80.8 mph; 70.2 kn)
- Aerotow speed: 130 km/h (80.8 mph; 70.2 kn)
- Terminal velocity: with full airbrakes 165 km/h (103 mph; 89 kn)
- g limits: +5.34 -2.67
- Maximum glide ratio: 23:1 at 83 kilometres per hour (52 mph; 45 kn)
- Rate of sink: 0.95 m/s (187 ft/min) minimum, at 72.5 kilometres per hour (45.0 mph; 39.1 kn)
- Wing loading: 26.2 kg/m^{2} (5.4 lb/sq ft)
