= Roter Vogel =

German single-seat motor glider, 1923

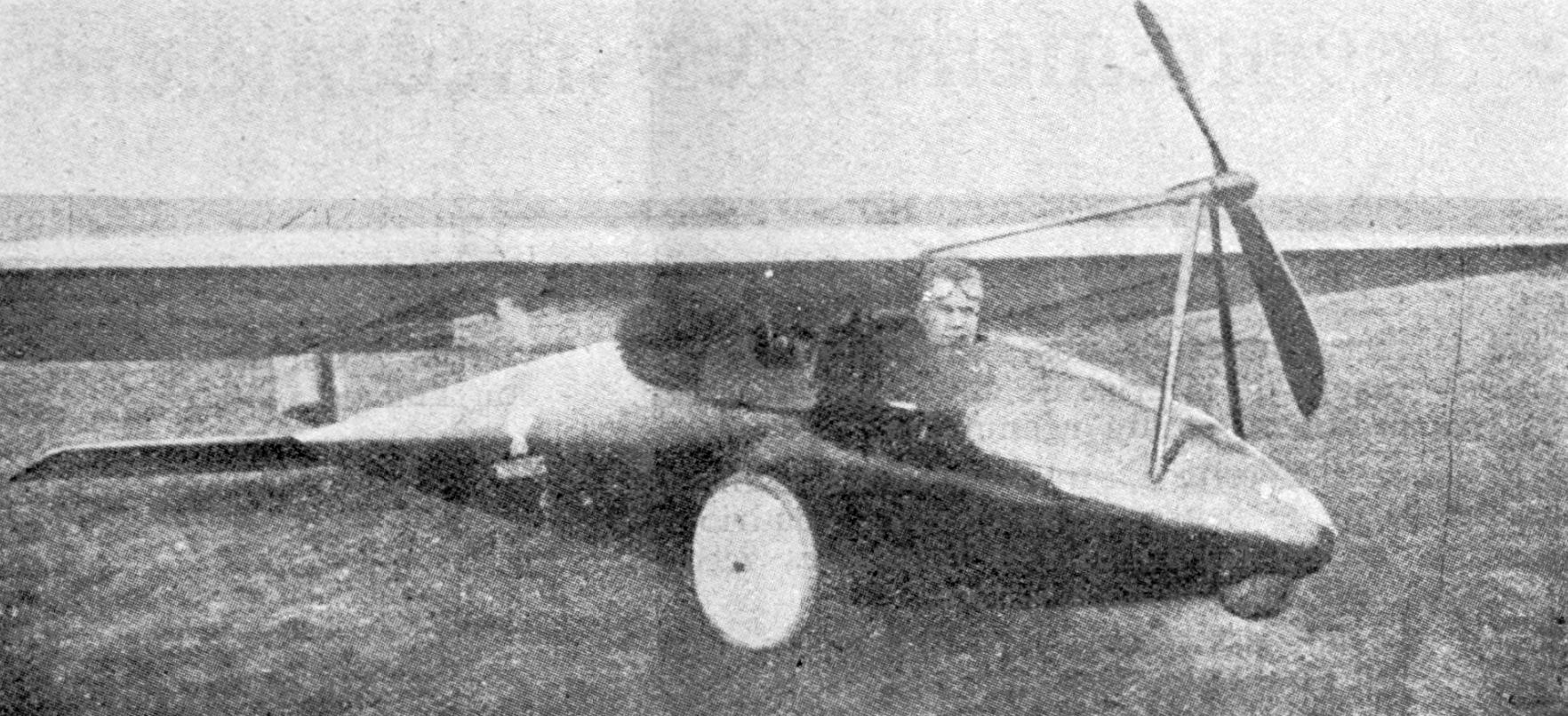

General information
- Type: Motor glider
- National origin: Germany
- Manufacturer: Baumer Aero Company

History
- Introduction date: 1923

The Roter Vogel is a German sailplane built in 1923 that was adapted for powered flight.

== Design and development ==
The high-wing, Roter Vogel was first designed to be a conventional glider, and was adapted for powered flight with the smallest engine available at the time.

The Douglas engine was mounted flush inside the cockpit of the glider, with the prop driven by internal belts. The rudder and elevators were hinged to be a single movable surface.

== Operational history ==
Roter Vogel placed second in the 1924 Roene Germany Light Aircraft Contest.

== Specifications (Roter Vogel) ==
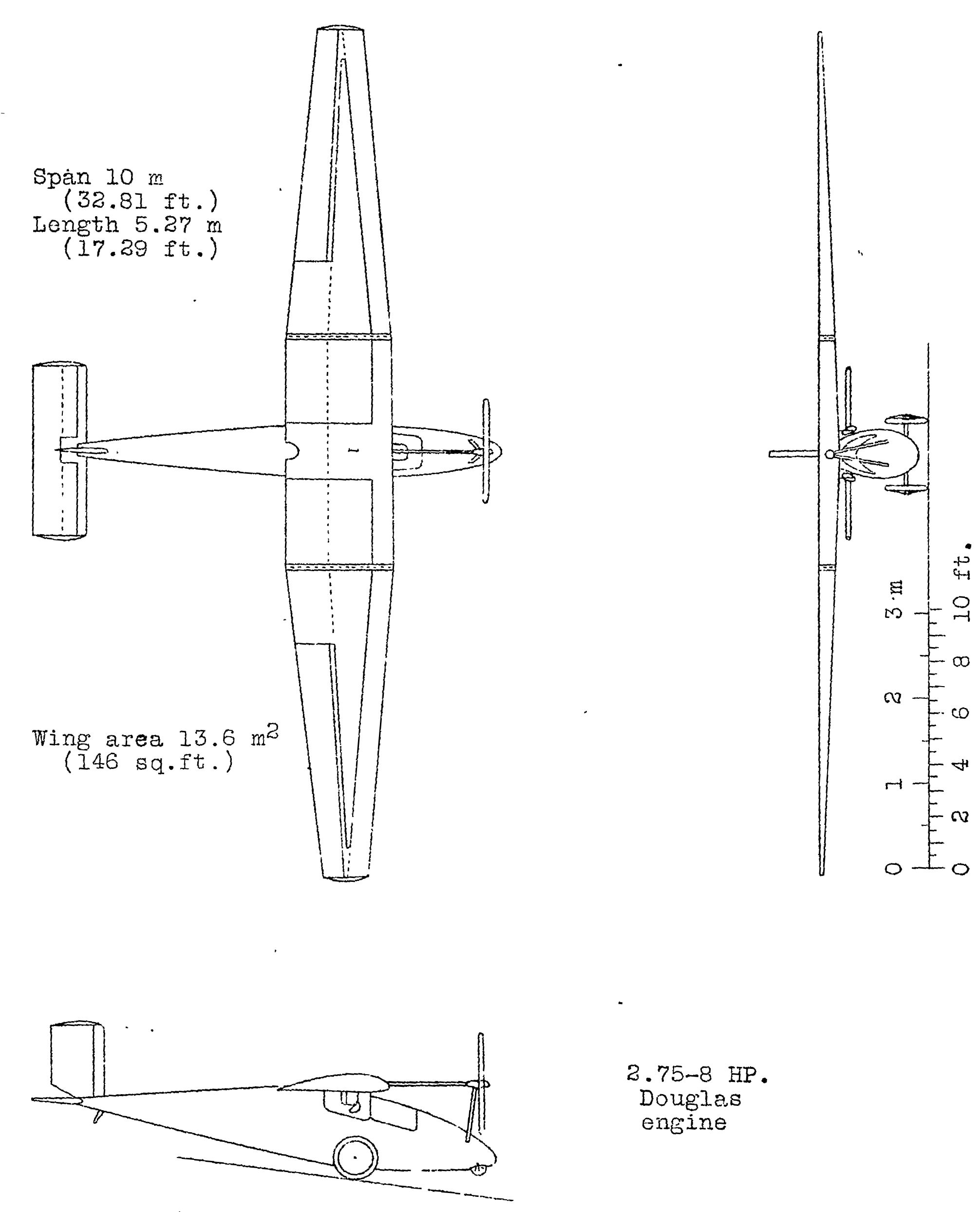
Roter Vogel 3-view drawing from NACA-TM-301

Data from Sport Aviation

General characteristics

- Capacity: 1
- Length: 5.28 m (17 ft 4 in)
- Wingspan: 9.91 m (32 ft 6 in)
- Wing area: 13.6 m^{2} (146 sq ft)
- Aspect ratio: 7:4
- Empty weight: 180 kg (397 lb)
- Gross weight: 235 kg (518 lb)
- Powerplant: 1 × Douglas 350cc air-cooled motorcycle engine, 6.0 kW (8 hp)
- Propellers: 2-bladed, 1.47 m (4 ft 10 in) diameter

Performance
