= LFG Phönix =

German single-seat flying boat glider, 1922

General information
- Type: single seat flying boat glider
- National origin: Germany
- Manufacturer: Luft-Fahrzeug-Gesellschaft (LFG)
- Designer: G. Baatz

History
- First flight: 1922

The LFG Phönix, also known as LFG Segelflugboot Phönix, LFG Boot-Phönix and Phönix 3, was a single seat flying boat glider built in Germany in the early 1920s.

== Design and development ==
The Phönix flying boat glider was built, like other Luft-Fahrzeug-Gesellschaft (LFG) boats, at their Stralsund works. It was designed by G. Baatz and first flew in 1922.

Its cantilever shoulder wing was built around a single one piece plywood box spar. In plan the wings were straight-tapered and had long, semi-elliptical tips. They were thick in section and strongly cambered at the root, thinning steadily outboard, and had 8° of dihedral. Short but broad ailerons, mounted on the rear of the spar, extended to the tips.

The Phönix's rectangular section hull had a single step on its planing surface. Externally the hull was covered with 2.5 mm (0.10 in) ply protected by waterproof canvas. Stability on the water was provided by totally enclosed underwing, stepless floats 3 m (120 in) out from the hull. Internally the hull was divided into a series of watertight compartments, with sealable doors in them for access. The pilot sat in an open cockpit between the wing leading edge and the nose, where an upward-opening towing hook, easily released from the cockpit, was mounted.

Its fixed tail surfaces were generous and broad, with a swept, straight-edged, round topped fin and a roughly rectangular tailplane mounted on top of ihe fuselage. The rudder was flat and broad at its top but narrowed downwards. In contrast, a general arrangement (g/a) diagram shows very small elevators.

== Operational history ==
In 1922-3 the Phönix was flight tested at Stralsund and at Rossiten, one base of the RRG and a home of German gliding in the 1920s. Some of these take-offs were made under wind power alone, with the Phönix moored to a buoy on a long, down-wind cable and rising like a kite. Others were made under motor-boat tow. In 1923 Flight referred to it as the Phönix 3 but nothing is known specifically about earlier models, though there are some differences between the g/a diagram and images, particularly for the rudder profile.

== Specifications (LFG Phönix) ==
Data from Gütschow, 1978, Das Segelflugzeug (1931), J2mcl : LFG Boot-Phönix

General characteristics

- Crew: one
- Length: 7.10 m (23 ft 4 in)
- Wingspan: 16.0 m (52 ft 6 in)
- Height: 0.9 m (2 ft 11 in)
- Aspect ratio: 8.4:1

Performance
