= Glasflügel 604 =

German single-seat glider, 1970

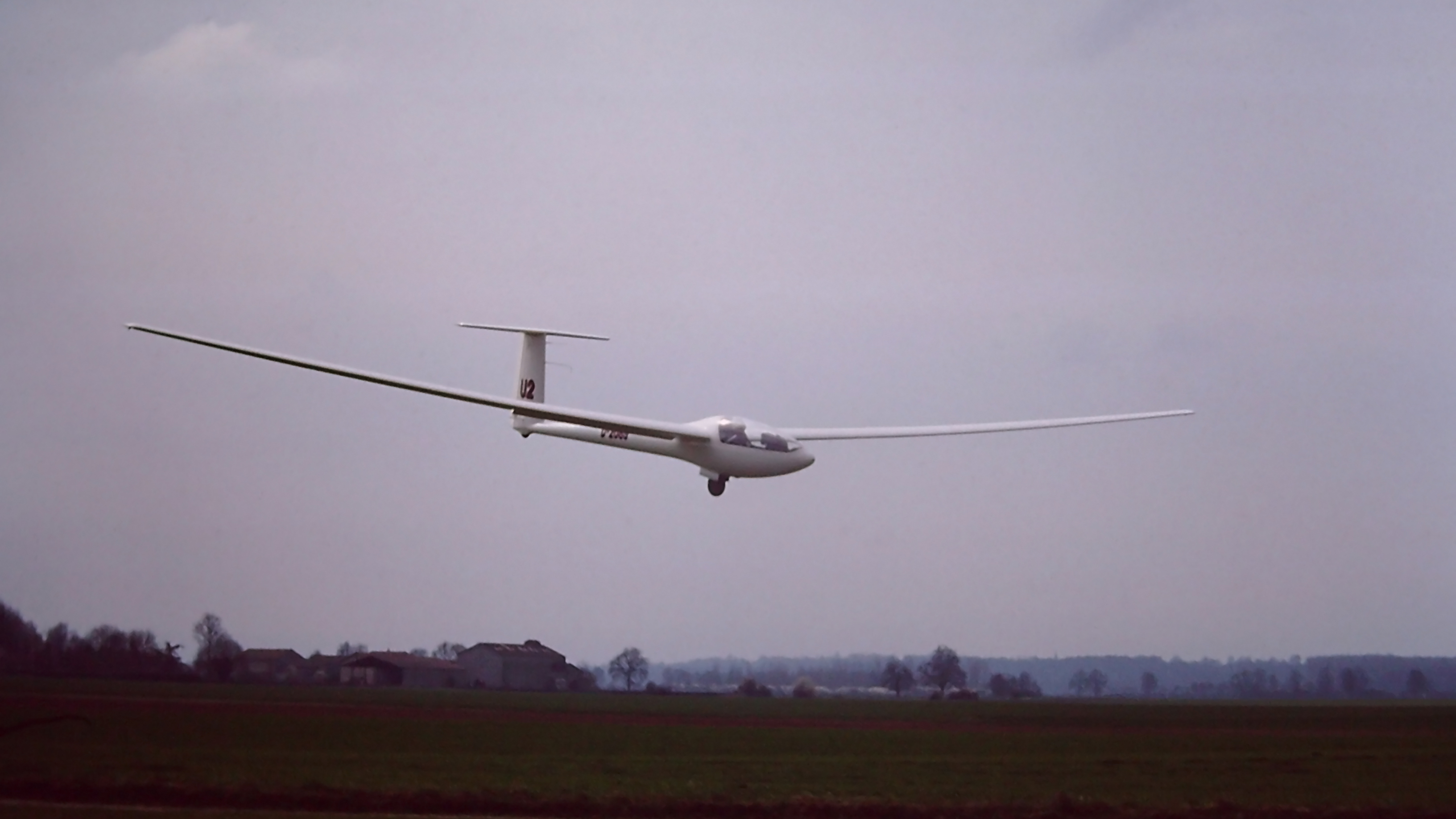

General information
- Type: Glider
- National origin: West Germany
- Manufacturer: Glasflügel
- Status: No longer in production
- Number built: 11

History
- Introduction date: 1970
- First flight: early 1970
- Developed from: Glasflügel Kestrel 17

The Glasflügel 604 is a high-wing, T-tailed, single seat, FAI Open Class glider that was designed and produced in West Germany by Glasflügel starting in 1970.

Developed from the Kestrel 17, the 604 is often erroneously called a Kestrel 22 despite the company never giving it a formal name beyond its number designation.

== Design and development ==
The 604 was originally intended as a test aircraft for a proposed two-seat glider that was never built. The prototype did so well in competition that a ten-aircraft production run was completed, resulting in a total of eleven 604s being completed.

Due to the aircraft's huge size, including its 22.0 m (72.2 ft) three-piece wing that weighs over 272 kg (600 lb), the aircraft picked up the nickname "the Jumbo". The wing centre section alone weighs 115 kg (254 lb), requiring a large crew in order to rig it for flight.

The 604 is constructed from fibreglass. The wing employs a modified Wortmann FX 67-K-170 airfoil at the wing root, changing to a Wortmann FX 67-K-150 at the wing tip. The wing features six flaps, with the outer pair moving at a 2:1 differential ratio with the ailerons. For glidepath control, the 604 has wing top-surface spoilers and a tail-mounted drag chute. The aircraft can carry 100 kg (220 lb) of water ballast. The landing gear is a retractable monowheel.

== Operational history ==
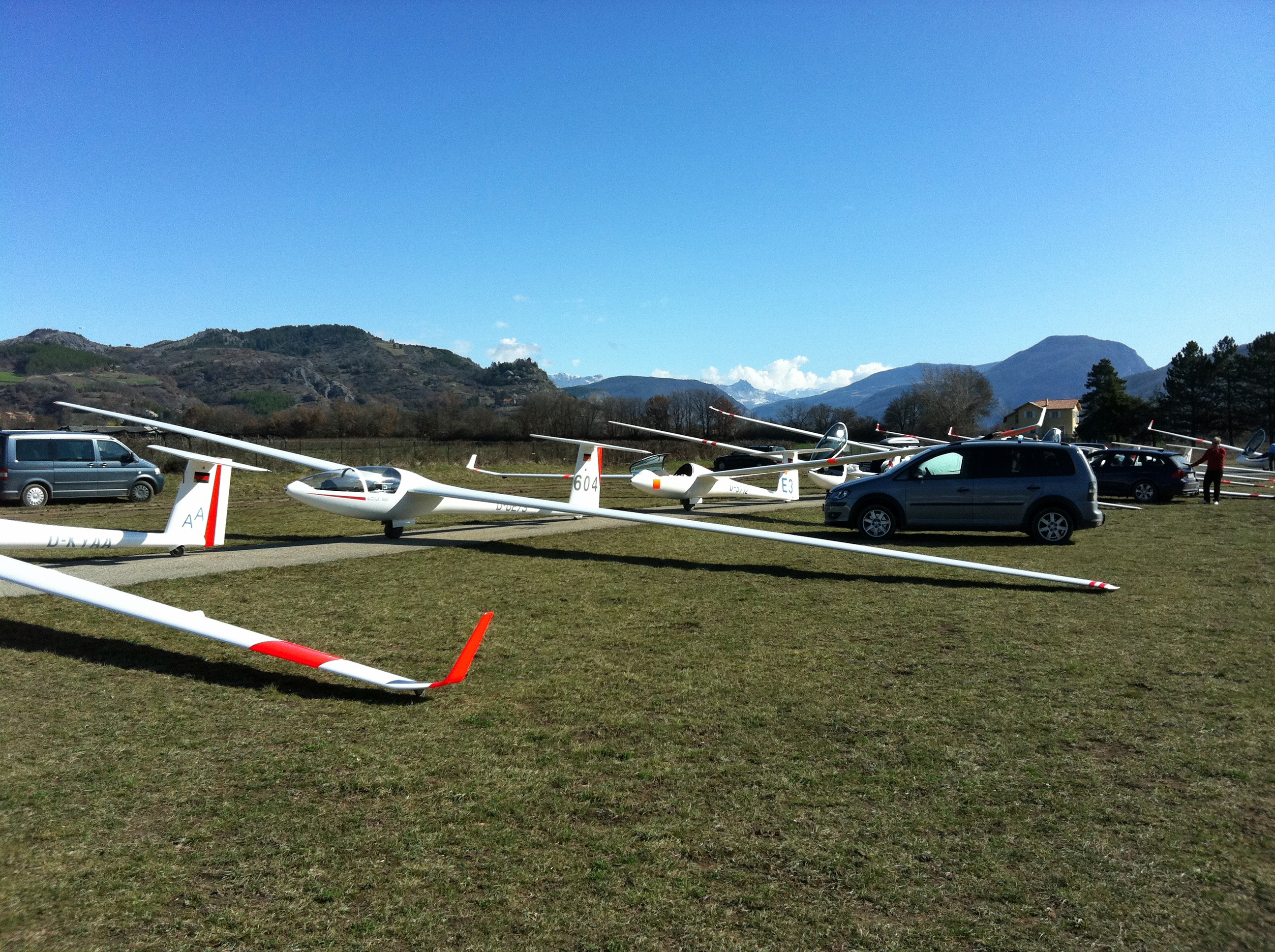
Glasflügel 604 on the start grid, at Südfrankreich.

The 604 prototype, flown by Walter Neubert, came in sixth in the 1970 World Gliding Championships held at Marfa, Texas, even though the pilot was lost overnight after a land-out during the competition and missed the following day. A 604 came second in the Open Class at the 1974 World Championships held at Waikerie, South Australia. The aircraft also set several world records between 1970 and 1974.

In 1981, Marion Griffith Jr. flew a 604 for 645 mi (1,038 km) from Refugio, Texas to Liberal, Kansas to win the Barringer Trophy, while also setting a US distance to a goal record.

In July 2011, five of the eleven 604s built were located in the United States and registered with the Federal Aviation Administration in the Experimental - Racing/Exhibition category.

== Specifications (604) ==
Data from Sailplane Directory and Soaring

General characteristics

- Crew: one
- Wingspan: 22.0 m (72 ft 2 in)
- Wing area: 16.3 m^{2} (175 sq ft)
- Aspect ratio: 29.8:1
- Airfoil: Wing root: Wortmann FX 67-K-170 mod, wing tip: Wortmann FX 67-K-150
- Empty weight: 420 kg (926 lb)
- Gross weight: 600 kg (1,323 lb)

Performance

- Never exceed speed: 249 km/h (155 mph, 135 kn) in rough air
- Maximum glide ratio: 49:1 at 61 mph (98 km/h)
- Rate of sink: 0.50 m/s (98 ft/min) at 45 mph (72 km/h)
- Wing loading: 37.0 kg/m^{2} (7.57 lb/sq ft)

== See also ==
Aircraft of comparable role, configuration, and era

- Schempp-Hirth Nimbus

Related lists

- List of gliders
