= Hutter =

Hutter or Hütter is a surname of German origin. Notable people with the surname include:

- Adi Hütter (born 1970), Austrian football player and coach
- Carsten Hütter (born 1964), German politician
- Cornelia Hütter (born 1992), Austrian alpine skier
- Gardi Hutter (born 1953), Swiss clown-comedian, author, actress and cabaretartist
- Gero Hütter (born 1968), German hematologist, known for performing a bone marrow transplant on a patient with HIV
- Jakob Hutter (1500–1536), Tyrolean Anabaptist leader and founder of the Hutterites
- Julia Hütter (born 1983), German pole vaulter
- Leonhard Hutter (1563–1616), German Lutheran theologian
- Marcus Hutter (born 1967), German physicist and computer scientist
- Matt Hutter (born 1971), American race car driver
- Michael Hutter (born 1983), American professional wrestler best known as Ethan Carter III or EC3
- Ralf Hütter (born 1946), German musician and singer
- Reinhard Hütter (contemporary), theologian and professor; Lutheran convert to Roman Catholicism
- Ulrich W. Hütter (1910–1990), Austrian-German engineer and scientist
- Wolfgang Hutter (1928–2014), Austrian painter, draughtsman, printmaker and stage designer

== See also ==
Various planes designed by Ulrich W. and Wolfgang Hütter in the 1930s and 1940s:

- Hütter Hü 17
- Hütter Hü 28
- Hütter Hü 136
- Hütter Hü 211
- Hans Hüter (1906–1970), German-Swiss rocket engineer
