= Göppingen Gö 8 =

Type of aircraft

Gö 8

General information
- Type: Scale research flying boat glider
- National origin: Germany
- Manufacturer: Schempp-Hirth
- Designer: Wolf Hirth and Ulrich Hütter
- Status: unknown
- Number built: 1

History
- First flight: ?

The Göppingen Gö 8 was a 1/5 scale model of the Dornier Do 214, a large projected trans-atlantic long-range flying boat, designed by Dornier Werke GmbH in Germany during World War II. The Gö 8 was used primarily to validate the hydro-dynamic and aerodynamic properties of the Do 214.

== Design and development ==
The Gö 8 was designed and built by Wolf Hirth and Ulrich Hütter / Schempp-Hirth at Göppingen. Construction was primarily of wood, with smooth surfaces, replicating the planing surfaces in scale. A retractable tailwheel undercarriage was installed in the hull. The pilot sat under a long greenhouse canopy which followed the profiles of the proposed Do 214, giving good visibility. Accommodation for a flight test engineer was provided in the hull behind the pilot.

== Operational history ==
The Gö 8 flight trials were undertaken at Oberpfaffenhofen, with hydrodynamic testing on Bodensee, towed by a motorboat. Further aerodynamic testing was carried out at the Göttingen aeronautical research laboratory.

== Specifications (Gö 8) ==
Data from Die deutschen Flugboote : Flugboote, Amphibien-Flugboote u. Projekte von 1909 bis zur Gegenwart

General characteristics

- Crew: 1-2 (pilot and optional flight test engineer)
- Length: 10.32 m (33 ft 10 in)
- Wingspan: 12 m (39 ft 4 in)

Performance
