= Dornier Do 214 =

Proposed flying boat by Dornier

Do 214
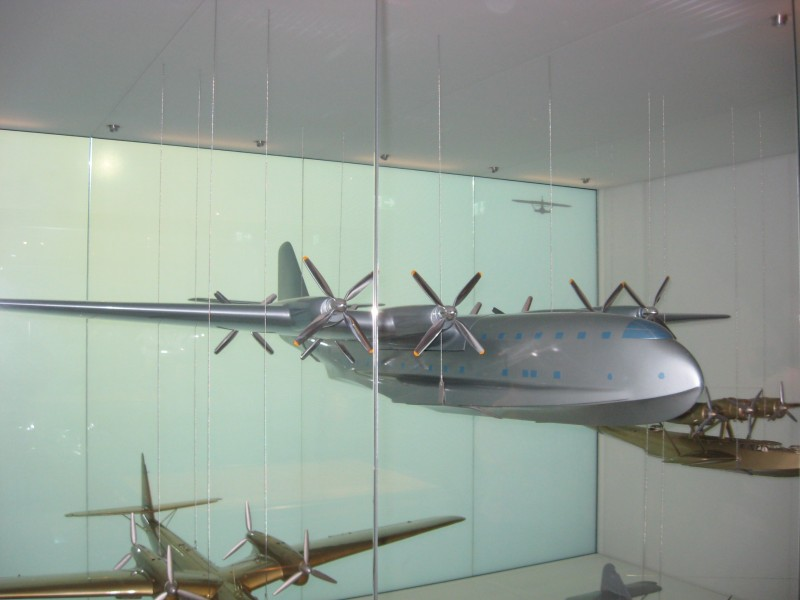
- Do 214 model at Dornier's museum in Friedrichshafen

General information
- Type: Flying boat, Long range transport
- Manufacturer: Dornier
- Primary user: Luftwaffe
- Number built: 0

The Dornier Do 214 was a proposed large long-range flying boat, developed by Dornier in World War II.

== Development ==
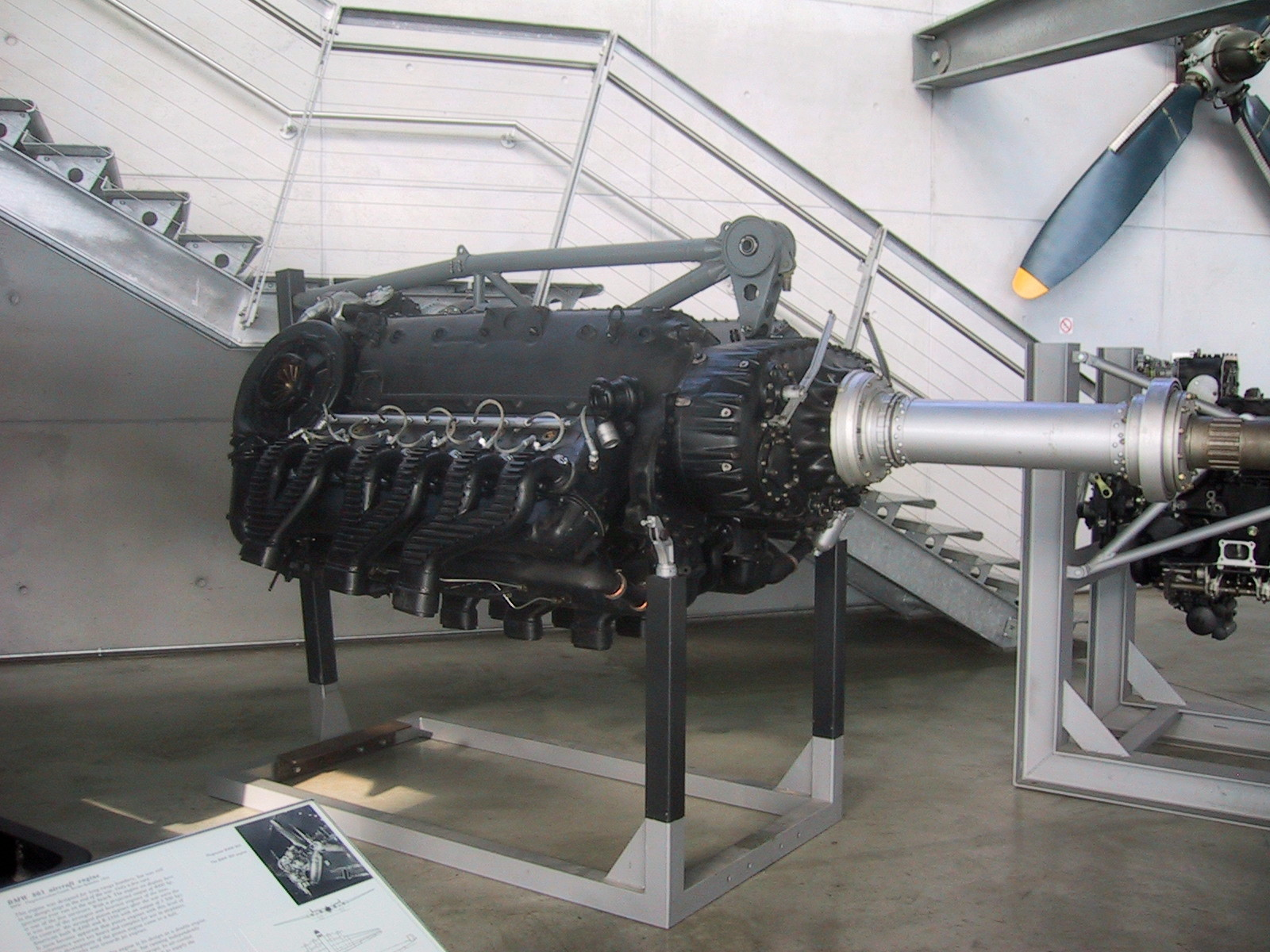
A DB 610 "power system" for an He 177A - the DB 613 was similar in concept and appearance.

Originally designed as the Do P.93 for passenger transatlantic service from Lisbon to New York, the Do 214 was redesigned as the P.192 for military service in early 1940. In 1941, a full-sized fuselage mockup was constructed in order to evaluate the interior layout. The fuselage was streamlined, having a round cross-section, with the interior consisting of two decks.

Its wings featured a small amount of sweep on the leading edge, with straight trailing edges, and were shoulder-mounted on the fuselage. Eight Daimler-Benz DB 613 24-cylinder "power-system" engines — themselves consisting of a pair of Daimler-Benz DB 603 inverted V12 engines, paired up to run a single propeller like the DB 605-based "DB 610" engines of the Heinkel He 177A, and themselves weighing over 1.5 tonnes (3,300 lb) apiece (the DB 613 "power systems" would have weighed more like 1.8 tonnes apiece) — provided the power, with four tractor engines and four pusher engines. All eight "power system" engines, using a total of 16 DB 603s to complete them, provided power to two quartets of four-blade VDM variable-pitch propellers; the front propellers had a 5.00 m (16 ft 5 in) diameter, the rear propellers had a 4.60 m (15 ft 1 in) diameter.

The mammoth eight-engine design was intended for use as a military transport, with a large bow door admitting vehicles and bulky freight to the upper deck. It was also designed for use as a long-range bomber, flying tanker, aerial minelayer and U-boat supply vessel. By 1943, it was realized that long-range flying boats were not needed due to the worsening war situation, and the Do 214 project was canceled.

=== Göppingen Gö 8 ===
A 1/5 scale model glider of the Dornier Do 214 was designed and built as the Göppingen Gö 8, by Wolf Hirth and Ulrich Hütter. For hydrodynamic stability tests of the hull integrated floats, in collaboration with the Göttingen aerodynamic laboratory, the glider was towed by a boat.

== Specifications ==
The following specifications are for Do P.192-01 / Do 214 / civil airliner / DB 613C engines.

Data from Die deutschen Flugboote : Flugboote, Amphibien-Flugboote u. Projekte von 1909 bis zur Gegenwart, Luftwaffe secret projects : strategic bombers 1935-45, Die Deutsche Luftrüstung 1933–1945 Vol.1 – AEG-Dornier

General characteristics

- Crew: 12 (Commander, pilot, co-pilot / navigator, 2x radio operator, flight engineer, 3x relief crew, 2x stewards, 1x chef)
- Capacity: 40 pax / 33,000 kg (72,753 lb) P.192-01; 333 troops P.192-03; 82,000 kg (180,779 lb) P.192-03
- Length: 51.6 m (169 ft 3 in)
- Wingspan: 60 m (196 ft 10 in)
- Height: 14.3 m (46 ft 11 in)
- Hull height: 6.5 m (21 ft) maximum
- Hull width 5.6 m (18 ft) without sponsons maximum
- Hull width 8 m (26 ft) over sponsons maximum
- Wing area: 500 m^{2} (5,400 sq ft)
- Empty weight: 76,000 kg (167,551 lb)
- Gross weight: 145,000 kg (319,670 lb)
- Fuel capacity: 66,000 L (17,000 US gal; 15,000 imp gal) in 21 lower hull fuel tanks, with a further 1,500 L (400 US gal; 330 imp gal) in outer wing tanks
- Powerplant: 8 × Daimler-Benz DB 613C 24-cylinder coupled V-12 liquid-cooled piston engines 4,000 PS (3,900 hp; 2,900 kW) at 2,700 rpm
- Propellers: 4-bladed VDM, 5 m (16 ft 5 in) diameter constant-speed propellers (tractor propellers)

4.6 m (15 ft) on translating extension-shafts (pusher propellers)

Performance

- Maximum speed: 490 km/h (300 mph, 260 kn)
- Cruise speed: 425 km/h (264 mph, 229 kn)
- Range: 6,600–8,100 km (4,100–5,000 mi, 3,600–4,400 nmi)
- Service ceiling: 7,000 m (23,000 ft)

Armament

- Guns: up to ten manned and remotely-controlled defensive cannon or machine-gun positions (armed variants)

== See also ==
Related lists

- List of military aircraft of Germany
