= Glasflügel H-30 GFK =

German single-seat glider, 1962

H-30

General information
- Type: Glider
- National origin: Germany
- Manufacturer: Wolfgang Hütter / Eugen Hänle
- Built by: Glasflügel
- Number built: 2

History
- First flight: H-30 GFK: 5 May 1962; H-30 TS: 20 August 1960

The Hütter H-30 was a single-seat glider design by German designer Wolfgang Hütter. Conceived in 1948, the H-30 laid the foundation for later designs by the manufacturer Glasflügel. The H-30 was intended to be a low cost company aircraft with high functionality and serviceability. Three variants of the H-30 were designed; the H-30, a prototype made out of wood; the H-30 GFK, built with Glassfibre re-inforced plastic; and the H-30 TS, built with a jet motor-glider powered by a BMW 8026 turbojet engine.

== History ==
In 1945, Wolfgang Hütter thought of building gliders based on the wood half-shell principle. Due to the stiffness of the wooden frame, several traditional glider parts, including ribs, stringer, frames, and spars, were eliminated. Although this method significantly reduced the cost and weight of the glider, until then this design had only been used in military aircraft, including the Bachem Ba 349 Natter and the Focke-Wulf Ta 154. Hütter thought that using this design would give his glider better handling in the air and on the ground. To decrease the weight of the glider further, Hütter designed the glider to have a narrow fuselage cross-section, a strategy that he had previously used when designing the H-28 in 1935. The glider was designed to have balsa plywood wings about six millimeters thick, in addition to an interchangeable V-tail that would reduce the glider's flow resistance and give it greater ground clearance than conventional cross-tail gliders. The design also included a hinged skid with suspension and shock absorbers and a spring-loaded spur as landing gear. Because the H-30 would be lighter than most other gliders, Hütter thought that it would be easy to produce and transport it.

In 1949 Hütter made his first attempt to build an H-30 in Breitenbach, Switzerland, but was unsuccessful. In 1955 Eugen Hänle joined the project. After attempting to build the glider again, Hütter and Hänle realized that the wooden glider could not support its own weight. To solve this problem, they replaced the balsa wood in the wings of the glider with fiberglass, due to it being lighter and cheaper. Several other design changes were made, including the replacement of the landing gear against a wheel, unconventional support of the control rods, and a number of structural optimizations. These changes to the glider reduced its weight significantly, with the rear half of the glider only weighing 7.5 kg. This version of the H-30 was named the H-30 GFK. On May 5, 1962, the H-30 GFK was sent on its first test flight, which was unproblematic until landing. On the final approach, the glider's brake flap mechanism failed, making it much more difficult for the glider to come to a standstill. After another failed test flight in June, Hütter and Hänle worked on fixing the problems with the glider's airbrakes. In April of the following year, Hänle went on a test flight in the revised aircraft, with no problems occurring. When describing how the glider flew, Hänle compared it to the AV-36 and said that turning the glider required less use of rudder than what was needed on other gliders. Ten years later, Ursula Hänle developed the H-30 into the Glass Wing H-101 Salto.

== Specifications (H-30 GFK) ==
Data from Die Entwicklung der Kunststoff-Segelflugzeuge

General characteristics

- Capacity: 90 kg (200 lb)
- Length: 5.56 m (18 ft 3 in)
- Wing area: 8.34 m^{2} (89.8 sq ft)
- Aspect ratio: 22.2
- Airfoil: Hütter
- Empty weight: 120 kg (265 lb)
- Max takeoff weight: 210 kg (463 lb)

Performance

- Never exceed speed: 140 km/h (87 mph, 76 kn)
- Maximum glide ratio: 33 at 85 km/h (53 mph; 46 kn)
- Rate of sink: 0.64 m/s (126 ft/min) at 65 km/h (40 mph; 35 kn)

== See also ==
- List of gliders
