= Allgaier (company) =

German manufacturing company

- Company type: Public
- Industry: Automotive, Process Technology
- Founder: George Allgaier
- Headquarters: Uhingen, Germany
- Area served: Worldwide
- Key people: George Allgaier
- Products: washing, drying, cooling, screening, sorting, conveying, automotive
- Number of employees: over 1700
- Website: allgaier.de

The Allgaier Group is a systems supplier for the international automotive industry, including production of body panel dies as well as forming technology involving the production of pressed components and ready-to-fit components. The second pillar of the Allgaier Group is machinery and apparatus engineering for process technology. Allgaier produces and deliver systems worldwide for screening, drying/cooling, washing and sorting to companies in the bulk goods processing industry. The company currently has about 1880 people, a good two thirds of whom work at the headquarters in Uhingen, Germany. The Allgaier Group includes production and sales companies in Germany, Spain, Sweden and other countries, as well as agencies in all major industrial countries of the world.

In 2011, Allgaier and Mogensen combined companies to create ALMO Process Technology. ALMO Process Technology is the North American Sales and Service division for Allgaier Process, Mogensen, Gosag, and ALMO Engineering – All part of the Allgaier-Group. Their office is located in West Chester, Ohio. This company also carries Mogensen screeners, Allgaier screeners, Allgaier dryers and coolers and Gosag/ALMO washing systems.

== Process Technology ==
ALMO Process Technology Inc. is the North American branch of the ALLGAIER Group, which is located in North America (Cincinnati, OH). Combining the names of the brands Allgaier and Mogensen, ALMO now represents the Process Technology division of the ALLGAIER Group in the US and Canada. ALMO Process Technology is active in the areas of Washing, Drying, Cooling, Cleaning, Sorting, Screening, Calcining, Dispersion drying, Biomass drying, and Sizing.

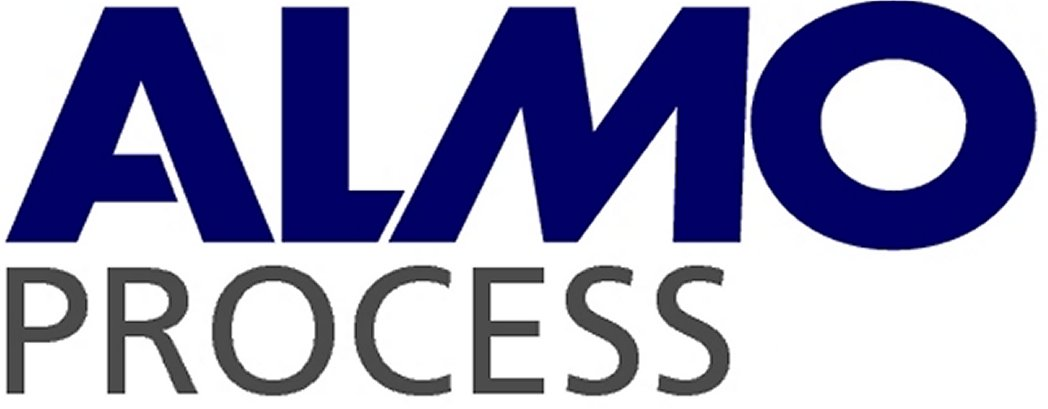
logo for ALMO Process

=== Washing ===
Washing Systems are mainly used for the Sand and Mineral Washing Process. Many times, a hydrocyclone is used in conjunction with an attrition scrubber and high frequency dewatering screen. Complete systems may also include a pre-slurry washing ramp as well as a Sizer in order to improve efficiency and throughput.

=== Drying ===
The drying technology department is headed by Dr. Ing. Mathias Trojosky. The drying technology that has been developed by Allgaier is notable due to its ability to conserve time, space, and energy while excelling in quality. Specialized machine types include Rotary dryers, Fluidized bed dryers, Rolling bed dryers, Suspension and Paste dryers, and Dispersion dryers.

=== Cooling ===
Is often combined with the drying process.

=== Screening ===
The screening branch of the process technology division specializes in accuracy and precision of screening a multitude variety of materials, including Stones and soil, Waste/recycling, Chemicals, Foodstuffs, Mining (coal/ore), Metallurgy, Wood/particle boards, Plastics, Pharmaceuticals, Ceramics, Fodder, Bio fuels/pellets. Screeners developed include: Tumbler, Gyratory, and Vibratory.

== History ==
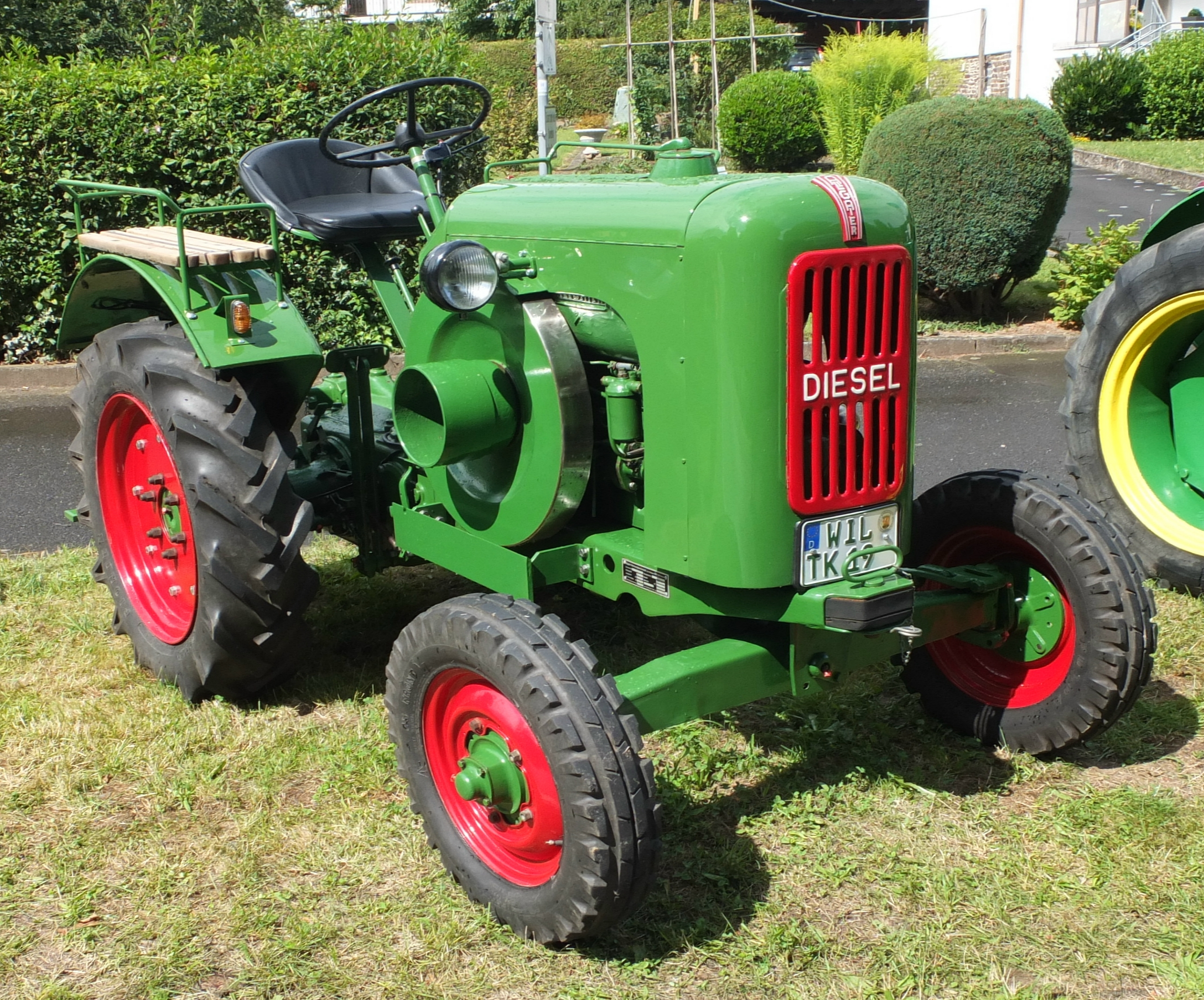
Allgaier tractor A22 built 1951

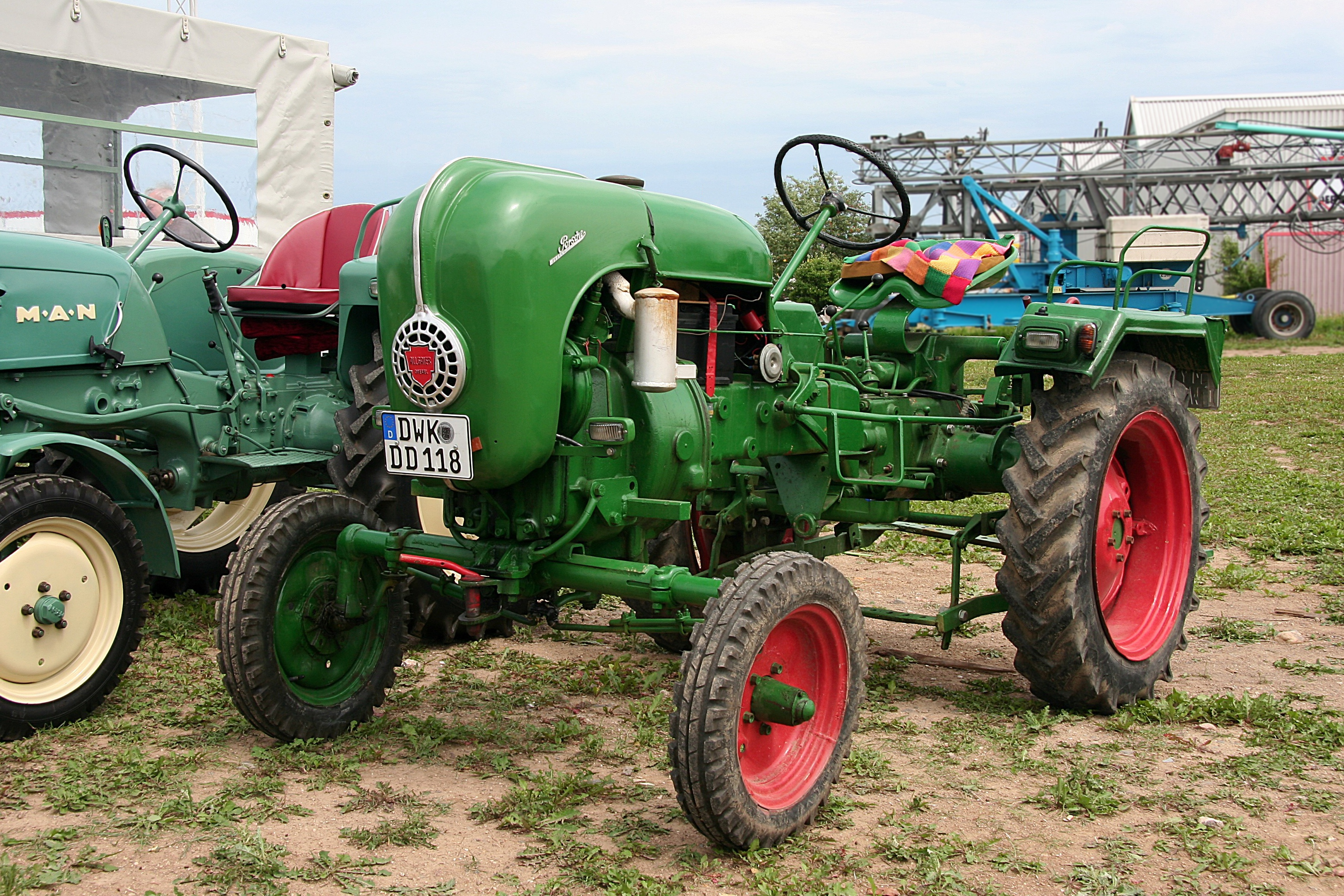
Allgaier tractor A111 built from 1952 to 1955

In the year 1906, Allgaier Werke Gmbh were founded by Georg Allgaier in Hattenhofen near Göppingen producing simple cutting and punching tools. In 1918 the company went to Uhingen, five miles away. First bigger assignment of large-scale body panels went to France and Belgium in 1928. 1929 Allgaier started to produce press maschines for car industry. 1933–1945 the company produced plane parts and windmills, but also bombs. For many years, Ulrich W. Hütter was the chief of construction. A soviet employee, Unterleutnant Stepan was hanged on 27 October 1943 by the Gestapo. Georg Allgaier died 1946. His heirs kept the company running, and in this year the company brought first tractor, model R 18, on the market. In 1953 production of wind energy systems for worldwide purpose was started. In 1955 production of motors and tractors was sold to Porsche-Diesel Motorenbau GmbH verkauft. Then production of screening machines started and also process technology. In the mid 60's the company had around 3000 employees. However, business with farming machines declined. The number of employees was less than 1000.

- 1975 – Dr. Dieter Hundt becomes the first sole managing partner of the Allgaier company, not a member of the Allgaier family.
- 1977 – Foundation of a first production subsidiary based in France. Purchases of further production companies in Schleswig-Holstein, Sweden and Spain shortly after.
- 1980 – Reconstruction of the press shop at the Uhingen headquarters as well as extensive investments in cutting-edge production technologies.
- 1986 – New buildings for the Automotive and Process Technology divisions for production and training.
- 1988 – Mogensen GmbH & Co. KG, Wedel, Hamburg is purchased by Allgaier.
- 1992 – C.G. Mozer GmbH & Co. KG, Göppingen is purchased. Merger of the subsidiary into the headquarters in 2003.
- 1995 – Fredrik Mogensen AB in Sweden is purchased.
- 2000 – Foundation of the sales subsidiary, "German Allgaier Werke GmbH" Shanghai, China.
- 2003 – Additional orders from the automotive industry for component production require building of a new Plant 6 (7000 square meters useful area), during the years 2001 to 2003 investments attain peak values of more than 20 million Euros per annum, and the production area had been increased by more than 50,000 square meters since the end of the 1970s.
- 2003 – Purchase of GOSAG S.A. in Spain, manufacturer of screening and processing systems.
- 2005 – Sales running at the equivalent of €25 m in 1975, the year when Dr. Dieter Hundt joined the company, have been multiplied to €255 m. The number of employees within the Allgaier Group increased from 830 to 1700 during this period.
- 2006 – Centenary of the Allgaier company.
- 2007 – Dipl.-Ing. Helmar Aßfalg takes over management of the company from Dr. Dieter Hundt, the latter taking up the post as chairman of the supervisory board.
- 2008 – The former business is split up into three independent companies. Allgaier Werke GmbH controls the Group as a holding company, Allgaier Automotive GmbH serves the automotive industry, and Allgaier Process Technology GmbH faces all the challenges of process technology.
- 2009 – Allgaier founds the automotive subsidiary, Allgaier de Mexico, and manufactures pressed parts and components for the automotive and component industry in the NAFTA from its site in Mexico City.
- 2010 – Allgaier founds the process subsidiary ALMO Engineering GmbH in Austria. Allgaier founds the automotive subsidiary Allgaier Automotive Tool & Die Beijing Co. Ltd. in China
- 2011 – ALMO Process is established as the North American subsidiary for the process technology division of Allgaier-Group

== See also ==
- Mechanical screening
- Rotary dryer
