= Hütter H28 =

German single-seat glider, 1930s

H28

General information
- Type: Glider
- National origin: Germany
- Designer: Ulrich Hütter and Wolfgang Hütter
- Status: Production completed
- Number built: about seven

The Hütter H28, also called the Hutter 28, is a German mid-wing, single seat, glider that was designed by brothers Ulrich Hütter and Wolfgang Hütter in the 1930s.

== Design and development ==
The Hütter brothers designed the H28 as a companion aircraft to the Hütter Hü 17, intending students to fly the H28 once basic skills had been mastered on the Hü 17. The design was made available as plans for amateur construction and about seven were completed. The aircraft was designed with small overall dimensions and in particular wingspan, so that it could be easily built in small workshops.

The aircraft is of wooden construction and finished with doped aircraft fabric covering. The 12.0 m (39.4 ft) span wing employs a modified Göppingen 535 airfoil, with some gliders fitted with symmetrical wing tip cap. The prototype had a straight wing, but the plans were altered to provide a gull wing.

Soaring Magazine said of the design, "It was pleasing of line, especially for a small ship, with a carefully shaped root junction and one of the first molded plexiglass canopies. It is possible to discern the lines of its distinguished descendant, the Libelle, in its shape."

== Operational history ==
An H28 was flown by Harold Jenson for Denmark in one World Gliding Championships. In 1983 one Hü 28 was reported as being registered in the United States.

== Specifications (H28) ==
Data from Soaring

General characteristics

- Crew: one
- Wingspan: 12.0 m (39 ft 4 in)
- Wing area: 7.60 m^{2} (81.8 sq ft)
- Aspect ratio: 18.46:1
- Airfoil: root: modified Göppingen 535, tip: symmetrical
- Empty weight: 88 kg (194 lb)
- Gross weight: 179 kg (394 lb)

Performance

- Maximum glide ratio: 23.5:1 at 80 km/h (50 mph)
- Rate of sink: 0.98 m/s (192 ft/min) at 70 km/h (43 mph)
- Wing loading: 23.4 kg/m^{2} (4.79 lb/sq ft)

== See also ==
Related development

- Glasflügel H-301 Libelle

Aircraft of comparable role, configuration, and era

- Schweizer SGS 1-26

Related lists

- List of gliders
