= Hütter Hü 17 =

Utility training glider

Hü 17
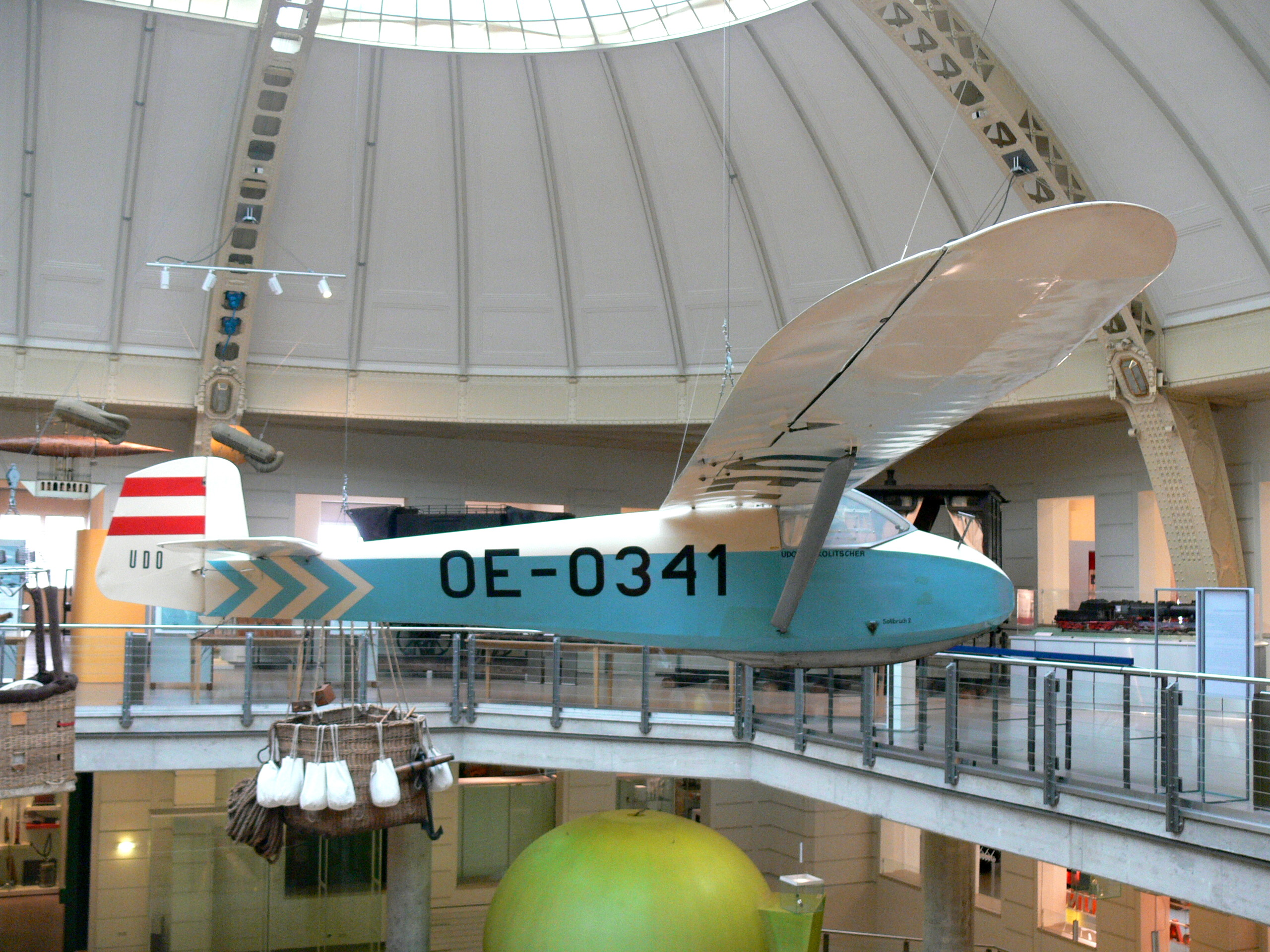
- Hü 17B in the Technisches Museum Wien

General information
- Type: Glider
- National origin: Germany
- Designer: Ulrich Hütter and Wolfgang Hütter
- Status: Production completed
- Number built: "several hundred"

The Hütter Hü 17, is an Austrian high-wing, strut-braced, single-seat, utility training glider that was designed by brothers Ulrich Hütter and Wolfgang Hütter in the 1930s.

The aircraft's correct designation is unclear and various sources refer to is as the Hütter Hü 17, Hütter-17, Hütter H-17, Hutter H-17, Hütter Hü-17, Göppingen Gö 5 and Goppingen 5.

== Design and development ==
The Hütter brothers designed the Hü 17 in Salzburg, Austria, the designation indicating the aircraft's glide ratio. The design was made available as plans for amateur construction and several hundred were completed. The brothers then joined the Schempp-Hirth company which constructed about five of the aircraft under the designation Göppingen Gö 5.

The aircraft is of wooden construction, using a D-tube wing with a single strut and doped aircraft fabric covering. The wing employs a Göppingen 535 airfoil at the wing root and a NACA M-6 at the wing tip. The fuselage is plywood covered.

== Operational history ==
In the 1980s a number of aircraft were still flying in Australia, West Germany, the United Kingdom and the United States. In July 2011 one example was registered with the American Federal Aviation Administration in the Experimental - Exhibition category, having been constructed in 1990.

== Variants ==
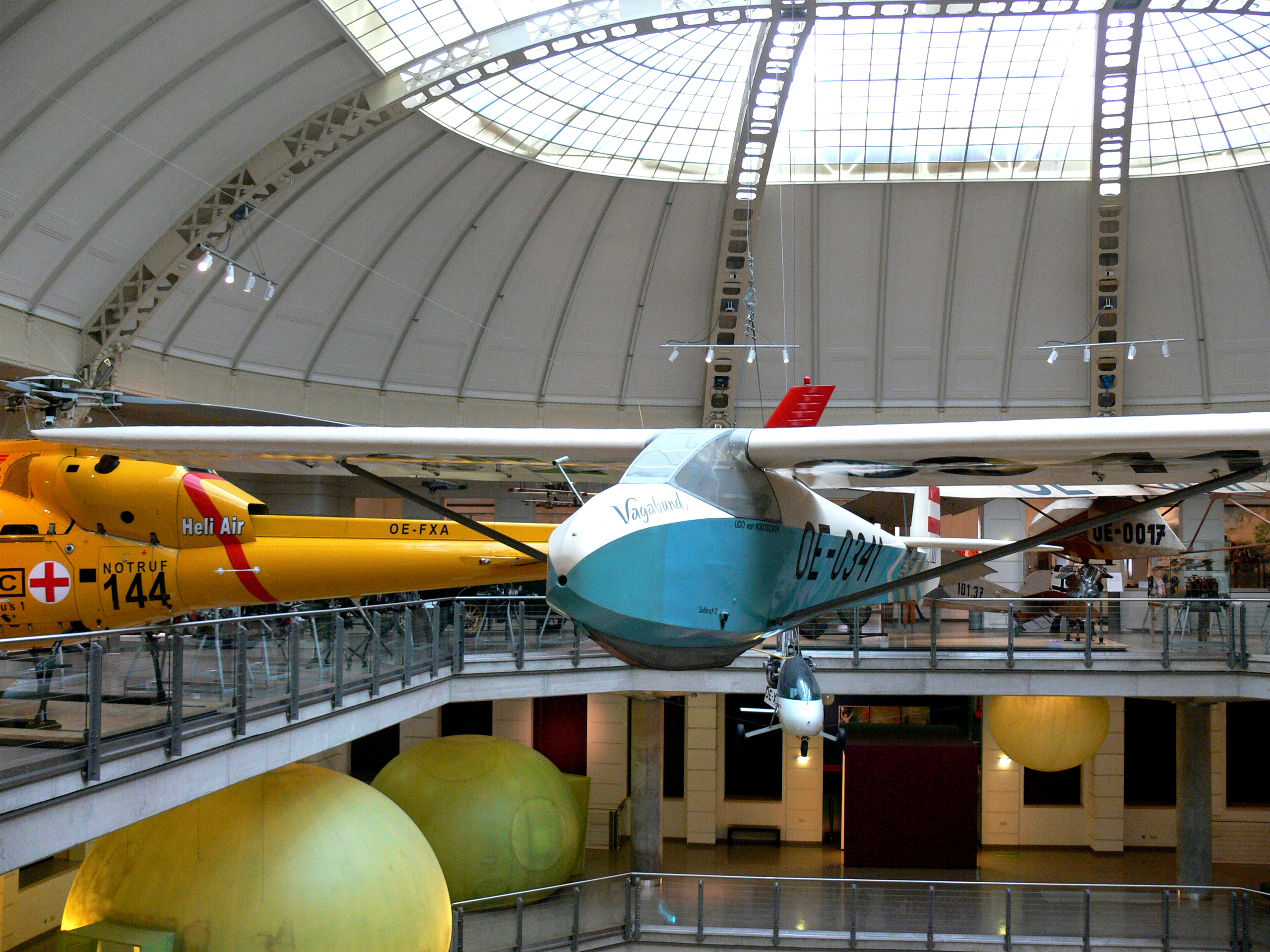
Hü 17B in the Technisches Museum Wien

Hü 17
Initial model with a 9.7 m (31.8 ft) wing span
Hü 17B
Improved model, introduced after the Second World War with increased wing span and higher empty and gross weights
Göppingen Gö 5
Model built by Schempp-Hirth
TG-24
USAAF designation for one impressed Gö 5 (serial number 42-57185)
CAT 20
Italian licence build, 1938. Over 20 produced.

== Aircraft on display ==
- National Soaring Museum
- Technisches Museum Wien

== Specifications (Hü 17b) ==
Data from Sailplane Directory and Soaring and The World's Sailplanes:Die Segelflugzeuge der Welt:Les Planeurs du Monde

General characteristics

- Crew: one
- Length: 5.18 m (17 ft 0 in)
- Wingspan: 9.96 m (32 ft 8 in)
- Wing area: 9.47 m^{2} (101.9 sq ft)
- Aspect ratio: 10.5:1
- Airfoil: root: Göttingen 535, tip NACA M-6
- Empty weight: 110 kg (243 lb)
- Max takeoff weight: 210 kg (463 lb)

Performance

- Never exceed speed: 160 km/h (99 mph, 86 kn)
- Aerotow speed: 100 km/h (62 mph; 54 kn)
- Winch launch speed: 80 km/h (50 mph; 43 kn)
- Maximum glide ratio: 17:1 at 64 km/h (40 mph)
- Rate of sink: 0.98 m/s (192 ft/min) at 61 km/h (38 mph)
- Wing loading: 22.2 kg/m^{2} (4.5 lb/sq ft)

== See also ==
Aircraft of comparable role, configuration, and era

- Schweizer SGU 1-7

Related lists

- List of gliders
