= Ulrich Hütter =

Austro-German aeronautical engineer

- Born: 18 December 1910; Pilsen, Bohemia, Austria-Hungary
- Died: 12 August 1990 (aged 79); Kirchheim unter Teck, West Germany
- Education: TU Vienna; TU Stuttgart
- Occupations: Aeronautical engineer University professor wind power engineer-pioneer
- Political party: NSDAP
- Spouse: Else Rommel
- Children: 3
- Parents: Eduard Hütter (1880–1967) (father); Margit Dietschold (1881–1913) (mother)

Ulrich Hütter (18 December 1910 – 12 August 1990) was an Austro-German aeronautical engineer and university teacher who came to wider prominence through his second career as a pioneer of wind power technology.

== Life ==
Ulrich Hütter was born in Pilsen in Bohemia, Austria-Hungary (today Plzeň in the Czech Republic). Eduard Hütter (1880–1967), his father, was an architect originally from Salzburg, whose professional career increasingly focused on monument conservation on behalf of the government. The family relocated to Salzburg in connection with Eduard Hütter's work after the war ended, and Ulrich Hütter enrolled at the classics-focused "Humanistisches Gymnasium" (secondary school) there in 1921, moving in 1930 to study Mechanical engineering and boat construction technology at the College of Technology (subsequently renamed) in Vienna. While still at school, he took to helping out in the workshops of the Rhön-Rossitten Gesellschaft gliding organisation during his summer vacations. He teamed up his spare time with his elder brothers Wolfgang and Heinrich to construct experimental flying machines. As their designs became more ambitious, in 1932 Ulrich and Wolfgang started to take lessons to qualify as Glider pilots, using the knowledge gained to develop more sophisticated flying machine models of their own design.

One product of their enthusiasms during these years was a basic glider which the brothers constructed in 1930/31. During the two years it took, the project was reported to have cost the brothers approximately 500 schillings for parts and materials. With a wingspan of 6.4 meters and an overall weight of 35 kg it was believed to be the smallest flying device in the world capable of accommodating a person. It was purchased in November 1931 by the "Vienna Academic Flyers' Group" ("Akademische Fliegergruppe").

In 1936 Ulrich Hütter switched to the College of Technology (subsequently renamed) in Stuttgart to study aeronautical technology, and emerging two years later with his degree in the subject. Meanwhile, in July 1932 Ulrich and his brother Wolfgang had joined the NSDAP (party), a move which presumably appeared career enhancing at the time, although it would cause problems for him after 1945. Hütter received his doctorate in 1942 from the Vienna College of Technology. His work, supervised by Prof. Dr.-Ing, Eugen Feifel, was submitted as "a contribution to the design fundamental for wind power plants". It expounded what subsequently became known as "Hütter's wind rotor theory".

Between 1939 and 1943 he was actually living not in Vienna (which had been incorporated into Germany since 1938) but in Weimar, where he was employed in several different roles, one of which involved heading up the aerodynamics department at the Weimar Engineering College. He was employed, in addition, as a designer-constructor at Ventimotor GmbH., a pioneering wind-power company founded in 1940 by Fritz Sauckel, the regional "Gauleiter" (governor) and Freundeskreis Reichsführer SS Walter Schieber, an exceptionally talented and well-qualified chemist-engineer with close links to the government. One of the principal projects for which Ventimotor GmbH. had been earmarked was as the supplier for a large decentralised power generation network using wind energy to be created in the context of the government's massively ambitious and gruesomely controversial "Generalplan Ost" for eastern central Europe. However, after German defeat at Stalingrad towards the end of 1942 it became the turn of the Soviet army to advance against the enemy. For the German army there would be no "final victory", and Germany's "Generalplan Ost" was over-written, after 1945, by the Soviet vision for the territories involved. During 1943 activities at Ventimotor GmbH. were suspended till after the war. According to one source he "served briefly in the military" before, still in 1943, being redeployed to Stuttgart to work as head of the construction-design department at the research institute of "Luftschiffbau Zeppelin GmbH." at Stuttgart-Ruit. Projects for which he was responsible at Zeppelin's research division included manned missiles, underwater towing devices and the Hütter Hü 211 high-altitude "night hunter" reconnaissance prototype.

During 1944 Hütter accepted a teaching post in fluid dynamics and flight mechanics at the Stuttgart College of Technology. In May 1945 war ended and he was interned, but the duration of his detention was reportedly brief. As a former party member he underwent a denazification process, during the course of which he was classified as a "Mitläufer" (loosely, one who had run with the pack) rather than an instigator or perpetrator of Nazi atrocities, and was accordingly permitted to set himself up as a freelance engineer and specialist consultant on wind energy at the home of his wife's parents in Kirchheim, just outside Stuttgart. In some ways it was a question of starting again, but despite the difficulties of the post-war years, Hütter seems to have little difficulty in finding work and being well paid for it. An early client was the British "Ministry of Supply", which commissioned him to write reports on aspects of German aviation research.

Between 1946 and 1959 he was employed as a "Konstruktionsleiter" (loosely, Head of Development and Design) by "Allgaier Werke", an engineering manufacturing business based at Uhingen (near Stuttgart) with several large automakers among its customers which quickly became established, in addition, as a producer of wind energy systems. Products developed under Hütter's leadership included 10 kW wind turbines and 3-blade "fast-runner" turbines.

Only in 1952/53 was Hütter's teaching position at the Stuttgart College of Technology reinstated. In 1957 he received his Habilitation (higher-level post-graduate degree). The degree project was characteristically practical, and described a procedure whereby unpowered aircraft [i.e. gliders] could be tow-started and launched, using relatively little equipment. Under more normal circumstances it would have been unusual for someone intending to pursue a career as a universities level teacher in Germany to wait till they were 46 before obtaining a habilitation degree, but Hütter's career path towards the universities sector had been far from direct, and had included the twelve Hitler years. The qualification conferred the right not just to teach, but also to lecture at the college (reclassified, following the extension of the curriculum on the arts and h7umanities side, in 1967 as a full "University").

1957 saw the unveiling of Hütter's StGW-34 wind turbine, widely viewed among admirers as a milestone in the history of wind energy exploitation, and the design-precursor for all modern free-power wind turbines. The design featured a windmill of 34 meter diameter, delivering 100 kW of output, employing glass fibre reinforced plastic (GFRP) and incorporating provision for blade angle adjustment.

In 1959 Hütter accepted an extraordinary professorship in the context of his appointed as head of the college's newly founded Department of Flight Physics. (Note: The department has been reconfigured and expanded on a number of occasions subsequently, and acquired a number of different names in the process. In 2022 it had become known as the "Institut für Bauweisen und Strukturtechnologie" (Institute for Construction and Structure Technologies).) As the size and scope of the department expanded, Hütter's status and seniority grew correspondingly, together with his international reputation.

In 1965 Ulrich Hütter was appointed to an ordinary (i.e. full) professorship, with his own teaching chair at the college. The final fifteen years of his professional career were increasingly focused on teaching and promoting wind turbine technology, both in Europa and further afield. His turbine designs increasingly attracted interest internationally, notably in South Africa, Abyssinia, Spain, Italy and France. Hütter not infrequently travelled to wind-energy construction sites in person, in order to be able to advise on (and learn from) issues arising with new installations. He also received and accepted invitations to deliver lectures and provide consultations in Sweden and North America. He appeared before the US House of Representatives in the context of hearings on wind energy, though it was probably more as a result of his lucid published work on the topic that his ideas exercised significant influence on the early US wind energy programmes and on subsequent developments in the sector, both in the United States itself and in other corners of the Anglosphere.

Ulrich Hütter retired from his university posts and other public-facing roles in 1980. On 12 August 1990, he died at Kirchheim unter Teck, where he had made his home nearly half a century earlier.

== Aircraft development (selection) ==
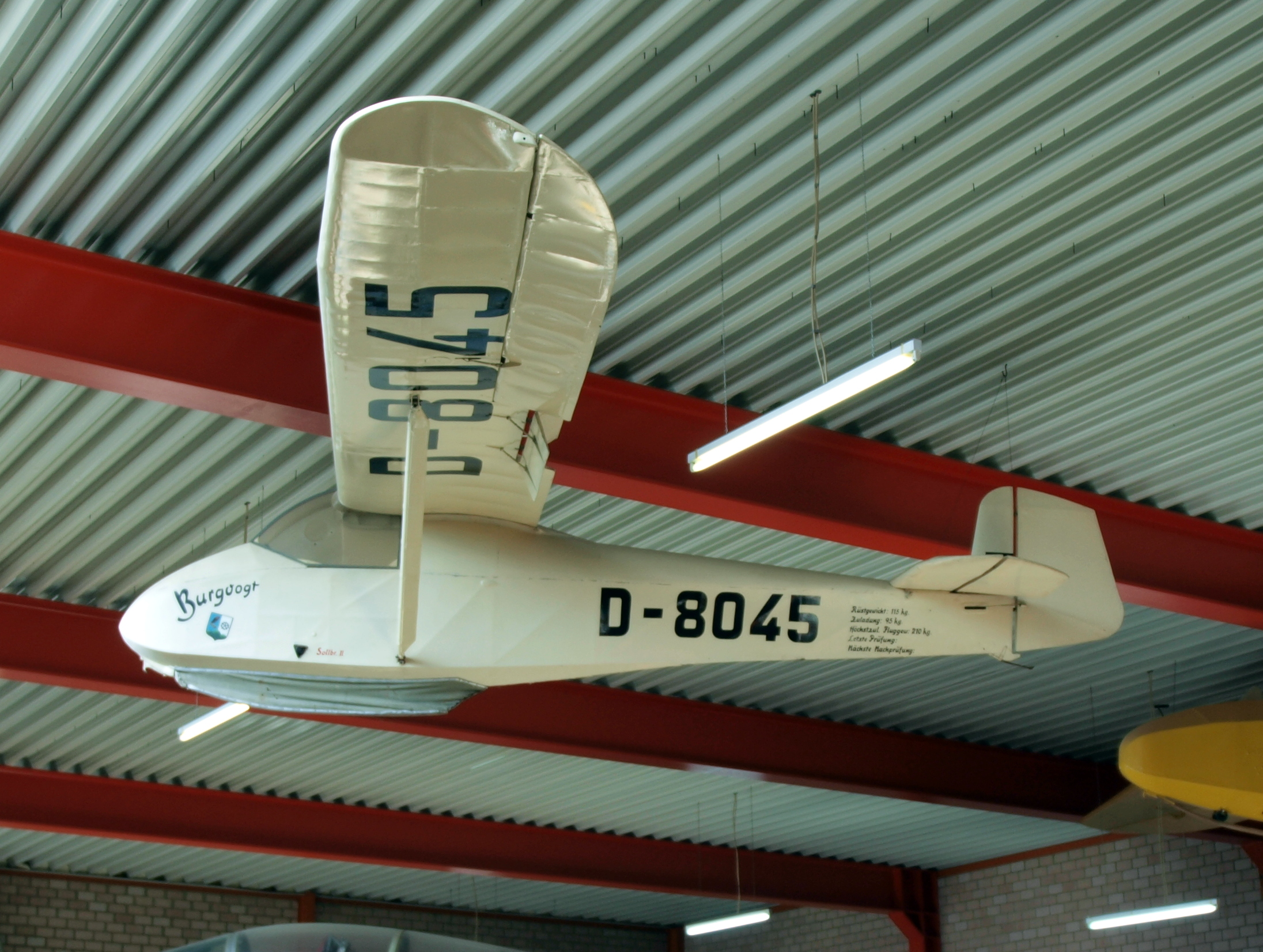
Kleinsegler Hütter 17

During the first part of his career, while still concentrating on aerotechnology, Ulrich Hütter designed and developed a number of gliders, frequently teaming up with his brother Wolfgang for the purpose:

- Hütter Hü 17
- Hütter Hü 28
- Hütter H 30
- Hütter H 30 TS
- Hütter Hü 211

== Recognition (selection) ==
- 1974 Thulin Medal ("Thulinmedaljen") in bronze, awarded by the Swedish Aeronautics Society, for services to glider construction.
- 1977 Aachen and Munich Prize for Technology and Applied Sciences, awarded by the Carl Arhur Pastor foundation for a lifetime's achievements.
- In 1986 the "Windenergie-Testfeld Ulrich Hütter" research facility at Schnittlingen was named to honour Ulrich Hütter.
- In 2016 Ulrich Hütter's contribution to energy technology was celebrated in a public mural created at Erfurt.
