= List of gliders (D) =

This is a list of gliders/sailplanes of the world, (this reference lists all gliders with references, where available) Note: Any aircraft can glide for a short time, but gliders are designed to glide for longer.

== D ==
=== d'André ===
- d'André Aérovoile (1908 glider)

=== D'Otreppe ===
(Bernard D'Otreppe)

- D'Otreppe biplane hang glider

=== Daams ===
(Fred Daams)

- Daams Falcon

=== Daimler ===
(Hans Klemm / Daimler-Motoren-Gesellschaft Werke - Daimler Aircraft Company)

- Daimler L15

=== Danieli ===
- Danieli Piuma

=== DAR ===
(Drjavna Aeroplane Robotilnitsa – ДАР Държавната аеропланна работилница)

- DAR Albatros Albatros
- DAR Chuchuliga Chuchuliga
- DAR Rilski Orel Rilski Orel
- DAR Zdravka Toprakchiev – ДАР Здравка Топракчиев
- DAR Zdravka Vekilski – ДАР Здравка Векилски
- Lazarov Drangov – Zvetan Lazarov

=== Darmstadt ===
(Darmstädter Flugsport-Vereinigung)

- Darmstadt FSV-2
- Darmstadt FSV-2c
- Darmstadt FSV-8
- Darmstadt FSV-X

=== Dansk Aero ===
(Dansk Aero Verkstad)

- Dansk Aero 2G

=== Dart ===
(Dart Aircraft Ltd)

- Dart Cambridge
- Dart Totternhoe
- Dart Grunau Baby
- Dart Zogling
- Dart replica Lilienthal glider
- Dart replica Cayley glider
- Dart replica Wright glider

=== Dart ===
(Bob Dart)

- Dart Aero-5

=== Davies ===
- Davies Glider-1
- Davies Glider-2

=== Davies-Nicholls ===
(Ken Davies & Alf Nicholls)

- Davies-Nicholls Primary

=== Davis-Costin ===
(P. Davis & F. Costin)

- Davis-Costin Condor
- Davis Condor 2

=== de Beaurein-John ===
(Janusz de Beaurein & Edmund John)

- de Beaurein-John 1909 glider

=== de Glymes ===
(de Glymes / SABCA - Société Anonyme Belge de Constructions Aéronautiques)

- de Glymes Colanhan

=== de Havilland ===
(de Havilland Aircraft Co)

- de Havilland DH.52

=== de Havilland Australia ===
(de Havilland Aircraft Co)

- de Havilland DHA G-2
- de Havilland DHA G-2 Glas II
- de Havilland EG-1
- de Havilland EG-2

=== de Monge ===
(Louis de Monge & Daniel Montague)

- de Monge DMP-1

=== de Rouge ===
(Charles de Rouge)

- de Rougé Elytroplan Sigma

=== Degasperi ===
(Luis E. Degasperi)

- Degásperi Primario

=== Degrandi ===
(Howard V. DeGrandi)

- Degrandi Slope Soarer

=== Dehn ===
(Karl Dehn)

- Dehn Ringwing

=== Delanne ===
(Maurice Delanne)

- Delanne DL-190
- Delanne DL-30 P2
- Delanne DL-60 E1

=== Delone ===
(N.B. Delone)

- Delone 1909 glider – Делоне 1909

=== Delta Sailplane Corporation ===
- Delta Sailplane Nomad

=== Démouveaux ===
- Démouveaux Aviator 1901

=== Descole ===
(Ovidio Descole)

- Descole Tío Pelado

=== Dessau ===
(Dessau F.V / Maschinenbau-Schule Dessau)

- Dessau Agfa

=== Detroit ===
(Detroit Aircraft Corporation)

- Detroit G1 Gull

=== Detter ===
- Detter zmaj

=== Devon Gliding Club ===
- Dickson Primary

=== Dewoitine ===
- Dewoitine P-1
- Dewoitine P-2
- Dewoitine P-3
- Dewoitine P-4

=== DFS ===
(Deutsche Forschungsanstalt für Segelflug – German research institute for gliders)

- DFS 38 Quo Vadis
- DFS 40
- DFS 42 Kormoran
- DFS 54
- DFS 194
- DFS 203
- DFS 230
- DFS 230 V7 (a completely new design)
- DFS 230 F
- DFS 331
- DFS B6, high-performance sailplane
- DFS Bombenjäger
- DFS E 32, sailplane
- DFS Einheitsschulflugzeug (Standard Flight Trainer), glider, basic flight trainer (foldable tail)
- DFS Fafnir
- DFS Fafnir 2 São Paulo
- DFS Fliege IIa (Fly), sailplane
- DFS Ha III, high-performance sailplane
- DFS Habicht
- DFS Hangwind, basic trainer (twin-boom)
- DFS Jacht 71 (Yacht), sailplane
- DFS Kranich-II
- DFS Kranich
- DFS Maikäfer
- DFS Olympia Meise
- DFS Präsident (President), high-performance sailplane
- DFS Reiher
- DFS Rhönbussard
- DFS Rhönsperber
- DFS Motorsperber
- DFS Schulgleiter SG.38
- DFS Seeadler
- DFS Sperber Junior
- DFS Sperber Senior
- DFS Stanavo, high-performance sailplane
- DFS Weihe

=== DG ===
(DG Flugzeugbau GmbH)

- Glaser-Dirks DG-100
- Glaser-Dirks DG-101
- Glaser-Dirks DG-200
- Glaser-Dirks DG-202
- Glaser-Dirks DG-300 Elan
- Glaser-Dirks DG-303
- Glaser-Dirks DG-400
- Glaser-Dirks DG-500 Elan
- Glaser-Dirks DG-505 Elan Orion
- Glaser-Dirks DG-600
- DG Flugzeugbau DG-800
- DG Flugzeugbau DG-800B
- DG Flugzeugbau DG-800S
- DG Flugzeugbau DG-808
- DG Flugzeugbau DG-1000
- DG Flugzeugbau DG-1000T

=== Diamond Aircraft ===
(HOAC AG / Wolf Hoffmann Flugzeugbau AG / Diamond Aircraft Industries)

- H36 Dimona
- H36 Dimona MkII
- H36D Dimona
- H38 Observer
- HK36 Super Dimona
- HK36 Dimona
- HK36R Super Dimona
- HK36TS Super Dimona
- HK36TC Super Dimonah
- HK36TC-100 Super Dimona
- HK36TTS Super Dimona
- HK36TTC Super Dimona
- HK36TTC Eco Dimona
- Diamond DA36 E-Star
- HOAC LF2000

=== Diana Sailplanes ===
- Diana-2

=== Dieder ===
(Ormand Dieder)

- Dieder glider

=== Diessner ===
- Diessner MD-1

=== Distar Air ===
- Distar UFM-13 Lambada

=== Dittmar ===
(Flugzeugbau Heini Dittmar) (The Condor series were built by several manufacturers)

- Dittmar HD-1 Condor
- Dittmar Condor II
- Dittmar Condor IIA
- Dittmar Condor III
- Dittmar Condor IV
- Dittmar HD-53 Möwe
- Dittmar HD-153 Motor-Möwe
- Dittmar Motor-Condor La Falda

=== Djurin ===
- Djurin Komarac I (Ustvari motorizovana Cavka - motorized Cavka glider)

=== Dobahov ===
- Dobahov Krymosoaviahim (Добахов)

=== Dobrovolski ===
(S. P. Dobrovloski)

- Dobrovolski 1911

=== Dohnálek ===
- Dohnálek D-1 Exp. 1922
- Dohnálek D-3 Tyny 1925
- Dohnálek Nina 1925

=== Doktor Fiberglas ===
(Ursula Hanle)

- Doktor Fiberglas H 101 Salto

=== Domenjoz ===
(John Auguste Domenjoz)

- Domenjoz glider
- Domenjoz Planeur-Voilier

=== Domrachev ===
(Y. V. Domrachev)

- Domrachev Leningrad – (Домрачева Ленинград)

=== Dorset Gliding Club ===
- Dorsling 1932 glider

=== DOSAAF ===
(DOSAAF - Dobrovol'noe Obschestvo Sodesystviya Armii Aviatcii i Flotu - voluntary society for assistance to the army air force and navy)

- DOSAAF Aktivista

=== Douglas ===
(Douglas Aircraft Company)

- Douglas XCG-17
- Douglas XCG-19

=== Drzewiecki ===
(Jerzy Drzewiecki / Centralne Warsztaty Lotnicze)

- Drzewiecki SL-2 Czarny Kot – Second Polish Glider Contest No.6 17 May – 15 June 1925

=== DSK ===
(Duster Sailplane Kits / Ben Jansson and H. Einar Thor)

- DSK BJ-1 Dynamite
- DSK BJ-1b Duster

=== DTGL ===
(Gian Luigi Della Torre)

- DTGL Fabrizio
- DTGL Sant' Ambrogio

=== DuPont ===
(Richard DuPont)

- DuPont Utility

=== Dunne ===
(J. W. Dunne)

- Dunne D.1
- Dunne D.4

=== Dunning ===
(Dunning / Southdown Gliding Club)

- Dunning 1934 glider

=== Dunstable ===
(Dunstable Sailplane co.)

- Dunstable 1939 glider – Dunstable Sailplane Company
- Dunstable Devil – Dunstable Sailplane Company
- Dunstable Hyper-Hols – Dunstable Sailplane Company
- Dunstable Kestrel
- Dunstable Primary
- Dunstable Golden Eagle
- Dunstable Goshawk

=== Dvořáček ===
(Břetislav Dvořáček)

- Dvořáček BDV-2

=== Dzelzcelnieks ===
- Dzelzcelnieks glider
- Dzelzcelnieks II
- Dzelzcelnieks III

=== Działowski ===
(Stanislaw Dzalialowski & Mieczyslaw Dzalialowski)

- Działowski Bydgoszczanka (No.2) – Second Polish Glider Contest 17 May – 15 June 1925
