= Angelika Machinek =

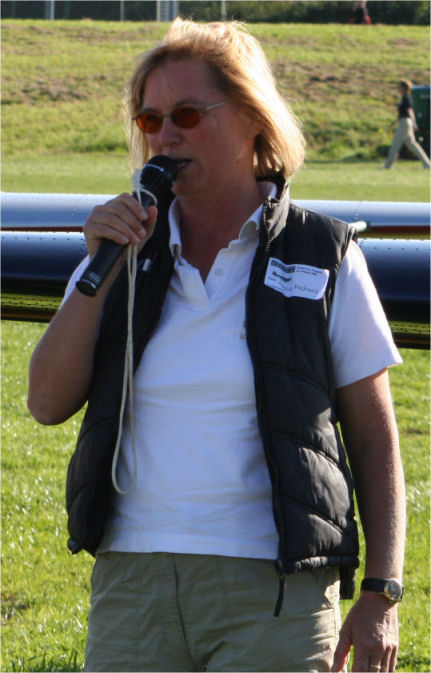
- Angelika Machinek shortly before her death in 2006
- Born: 17 November 1956; Eschershausen, Holzminden Germany
- Died: 12 October 2006 (aged 49) near Echzell, Hesse, Germany
- Occupation: Pilot

Angelika Machinek (17 November 1956 – 12 October 2006) was a German glider pilot. Born in the district of Holzminden, she started gliding at the age of 14, gained her pilot’s license in 1973 and received her instructor’s license in 1980. She was five times German gliding champion between 1994 and 2006 and broke nine FIA gliding world records, four in the D1M class, four in D15 and one in DO. She won the Elly-Beinhorn Rally in 1998, the first International Hexencup in 2003 and the first International Flatland Cup in Hungary, in 2006. She died while flying a microlight shortly after the last win and a fund to promote women glider pilots was set up as a legacy for her in 2007.

== Biography ==
Angelika Machinek was born on 17 November 1956 in the village of Eschershausen in the district of Holzminden. She studied sociology and German at University of Göttingen and received her doctorate in modern German literature from Goethe University Frankfurt in 1985. She subsequently worked as a dramaturge and author on topics including the Göttingen Seven.

At the age of 14, she started gliding, gaining her pilot’s license in 1973, aerobatic license in 1979 and instructor’s license in 1980. She competed at national and international level, being named German Champion five times, in 1994 at Marpingen, 1998 at Jena, 2000 at Neresheim, 2004 at Klix and 2006 at Coburg. She won the Elly-Beinhorn Rally in 1998, the first International Hexencup in 2003 and the first International Flatland Cup in Szeged, Hungary, in 2006. The FAI Gliding Commission presented her with the Pelagia Majewska Gliding Medal in 2000 for her achievements.

Dr Machinek was killed, aged 49, near Echzell, in Hesse. She crashed while flying a microlight.

== World Records ==
Dr Machinek has held a total of nine gliding records in three different classes as recognised by the FAI Gliding Commission.

Date	Class	Type of record	Record	Aircraft	Notes
14 December 1996	D1-M	Speed over a triangular course of 300 km	139.97 km/h (86.97 mph)	Schleicher ASW 24 E	Retired by change in code
15 December 1996	D1-M	Triangle distance	582.85 km (362.17 mi)	Schleicher ASW 24 E	Retired by change in code
15 December 1996	D1-M	Speed over a triangular course of 500 km	129.43 km/h (80.42 mph)	Schleicher ASW 24 E	Retired by change in code
7 January 1997	D1-M	Speed over a triangular course of 100 km	142.4 km/h (88.5 mph)	Schleicher ASW 24 E	Retired by change in code
18 December 1998	D15	Speed over an out-and-return course of 500 km	136.59 km/h (84.87 mph)	Schempp-Hirth Discus	
22 December 1998	D15	Speed over a triangular course of 750 km	119.79 km/h (74.43 mph)	Schempp-Hirth Discus	
5 January 1999	DO	Speed over a triangular course of 1000 km	126.09 km/h (78.35 mph)	Schleicher ASH 25 E	
6 December 2002	D15	Speed over a triangular course of 100 km	142.4 km/h (88.5 mph)	Schempp-Hirth Ventus-2cM	
6 December 2002	D15	Speed over a triangular course of 300 km	153.8 km/h (95.6 mph)	Schempp-Hirth Ventus-2cM	

== Publications ==
- Machinek, Angelika. B. Traven und Max Stirner: der Einfluss Stirners auf Ret Marut-B. Traven : eine literatursoziologische Untersuchung zur Affinitat ihrer Weltanschauungen. Göttingen: Davids Drucke, 1986.
- Machinek, Angelika. Dann wird Gehorsam zum Verbrechen: die Göttinger Sieben, ein Konflikt um Obrigkeitswillkür und Zivilcourage. Göttingen : Steidl (in collaboration with Göttingen Theatre), 1989.
- Wallraff, Günter; Angelika Machinek. Wallraff war da: ein Lesebuch. Göttingen : Steidl, 1989.

== Legacy ==
Dr Machinek was a strong advocate of women’s gliding and a fund to promote women glider pilots was set up as a legacy for her on 6 January 2007. In 2016, a road in Bockenheim was also named after her. In 2017, a path on the Ith was named Angelika Machinek Weg in her honour.
