= Schleicher ASW 19 =

German glider, 1975

ASW 19
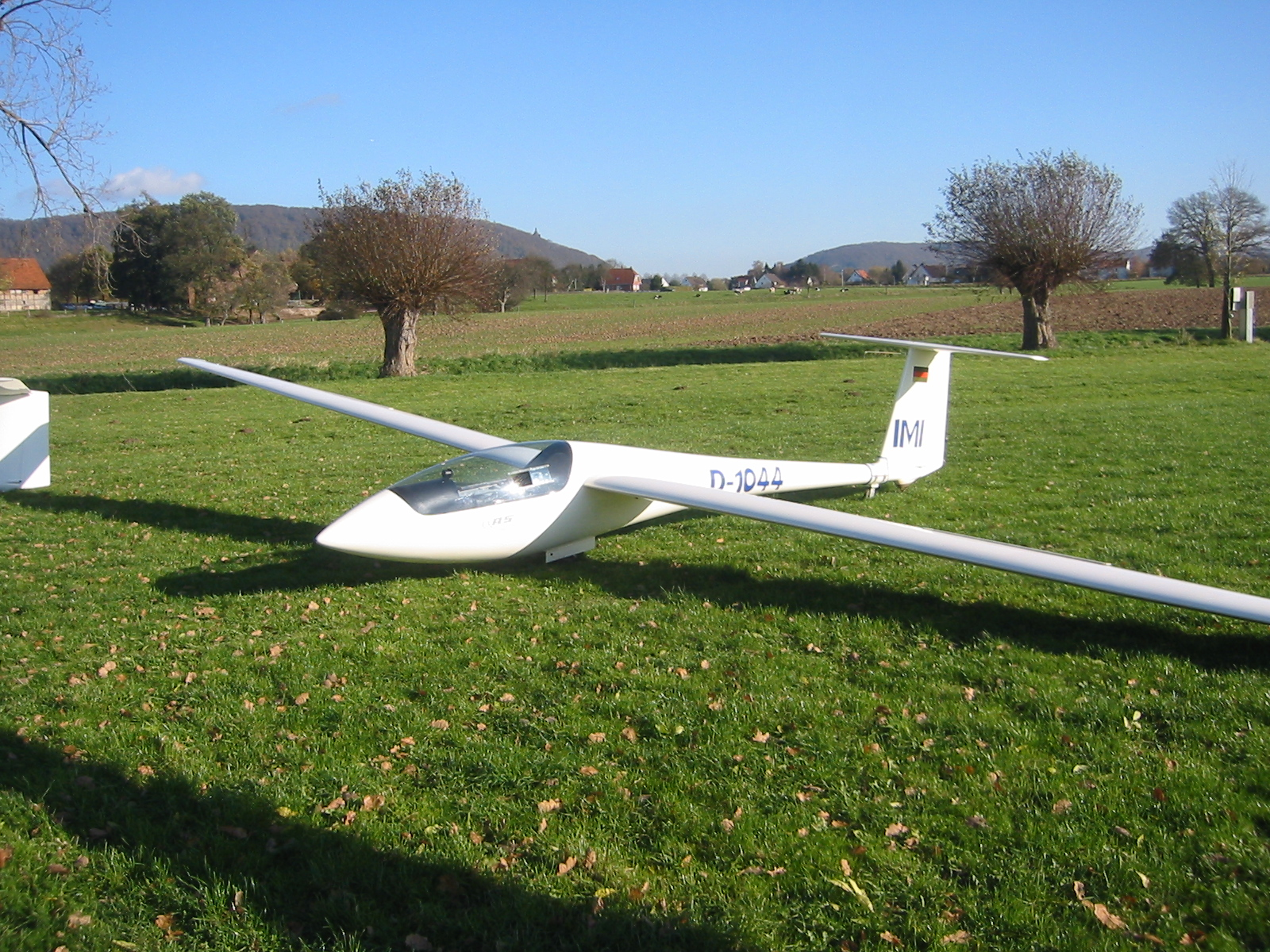

General information
- Type: Club-class sailplane
- National origin: Germany
- Manufacturer: Schleicher
- Designer: Gerhard Waibel
- Number built: 425

History
- First flight: 23 November 1975

The ASW 19 is a single-seat glider built by Alexander Schleicher GmbH & Co, first flying in 1975. It was originally designed as a Standard Class glider, but now mainly competes in the Club Class. The ASW 19 is known for its pleasant handling and some clubs use it as a training glider. It was succeeded by the all-new Schleicher ASW 24.

== Design ==
The wings are from the ASW 15 with upper-surface Schempp-Hirth metal air brakes added. Later models received modified brakes with an additional panel to improve effectiveness.

The all-new fibreglass fuselage was built without the honeycombs that were used on the ASW 15 and ASW 17. It has a winch hook, which is covered by the main wheel doors, and an aerotow hook situated approximately 30 cm (12 in) from the nose.

The wings are held in place with two main pins. Up to 80 kg (180 lb) of water ballast can be carried. The tail unit is also of glassfibre/foam sandwich, and the horizontal tailplane has a fixed stabilizer.

== Variants ==
With the ASW 19b version, the maximum allowed amount of water ballast increased and the take-off weight can be raised to 454 kg. Later ASW 19B were delivered with an instrument panel that lifts with the canopy. This feature can be retrofitted to older models.

The ASW 19 Club is a version with a fixed unsprung monowheel and no water ballast carried. Only five were built for the Royal Air Force, where they were known as the Valiant TX.1.

At the Delft University of Technology a single ASW 19 was fitted with a new wing profile featuring turbulator blow holes. This ASW 19X showed improved gliding capabilities with a best glide ratio of about 41:1.

== Operators ==
United Kingdom

- Royal Air Force
- University College London Gliding Club

France

- 3 French Air Force ("F05" n°276, "F06" n°277,"F07" n°323)

United States

- Greater Boston Soaring Club

== Specifications (ASW 19b) ==
Data from Jane's all the World's Aircraft 1980–81

General characteristics

- Crew: 1
- Capacity: 80 kg (180 lb) water ballast
- Length: 6.82 m (22 ft 5 in)
- Wingspan: 15 m (49 ft 3 in)
- Height: 1.45 m (4 ft 9 in)
- Wing area: 11 m^{2} (120 sq ft)
- Aspect ratio: 20.4
- Airfoil: root: Wortmann FX-61-163; tip: Wortmann FX-60-126
- Empty weight: 245 kg (540 lb)
- Max takeoff weight: 454 kg (1,001 lb)

Performance

- Stall speed: 67 km/h (42 mph, 36 kn)
- Never exceed speed: 255 km/h (158 mph, 138 kn)
- Max rough air speed: 170 km/h (110 mph; 92 kn)
- Max aerotow speed: 170 km/h (110 mph; 92 kn)
- Max winch launch speed: 125 km/h (78 mph; 67 kn)
- Maximum glide ratio: 38.5:1 at 112 km/h (70 mph; 60 kn)
- Rate of sink: 0.55 m/s (108 ft/min) at 75 km/h (47 mph; 40 kn)
- Wing loading: 41.3 kg/m^{2} (8.5 lb/sq ft) maximum

== See also ==
Aircraft of comparable role, configuration, and era

- Glasflügel H-206
- Rolladen-Schneider LS4
- Schempp-Hirth Discus
- SZD-41 Jantar Standard

Related lists

- List of gliders
