= Gerhard Waibel =

Gerhard Waibel may refer to:

- Gerhard Waibel (engineer), designer of gliders who worked for Alexander Schleicher GmbH & Co
- Gerhard Waibel (motorcyclist) (born 1958), former Grand Prix motorcycle road racer from Germany
