= LS8 =

LS8 can be an abbreviation for :

- Rolladen-Schneider LS8, single-seat glider manufactured in Germany
- The postcode for the Roundhay area of Leeds
- Nickname for Lotta Schelin (born 1984), Swedish women's footballer (from her initials and the number 8 she wears for the country's national team)
