= Schempp-Hirth Discus-2 =

German single-seat glider, 1984

Discus-2
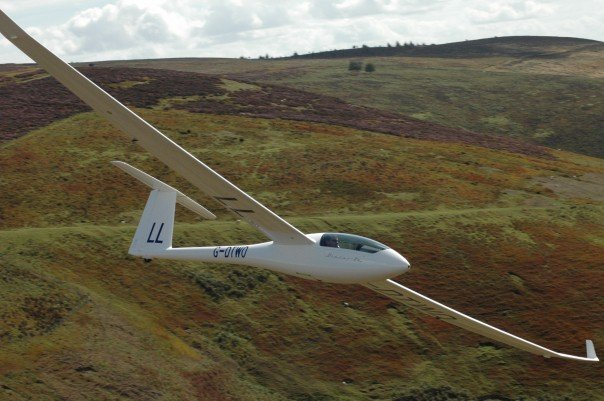
- Discus-2a 15m

General information
- Type: Standard-class sailplane
- National origin: Germany
- Manufacturer: Schempp-Hirth

History
- First flight: ca. 1997

The Schempp-Hirth Discus-2 is a Standard Class sailplane produced by Schempp-Hirth since 1998. It replaced the highly successful Schempp-Hirth Discus.

== Design and development ==
In plan view the almost crescent shape of the leading edge is similar to the Discus but is tapered in three stages. An entirely new wing section is used. The dihedral towards the tips was greatly increased compared with the Discus. Winglets are an optional extra. A version with a narrow fuselage is called the Discus-2a and the wider fuselage version is called the 2b. The fuselage was specifically designed to be highly crash resistant. In U.S. Air Force service the Discus-2b is known as the TG-15B.

The Discus-2 has also been successful though the competition from the Rolladen-Schneider LS8 and the Alexander Schleicher ASW 28 has meant that the Discus-2 has not sold in such great numbers as its predecessor, which went unchallenged for many years.

=== 18 metre version ===
A version with an 18-metre span, with the option of smaller wing tips to fly as a Standard Class glider, was launched in 2004 and designated Discus-2c. When fitted with a small sustaining engine (turbo) it is designated Discus-2cT.

== Variants ==
Discus-2a
Production variant with 15 metre wingspan and narrow cockpit. 0.54 m (1.77 ft) in width, 0.75 m (2.46 ft) in height.
Discus-2b
Production variant with 15 metre wingspan and wider cockpit. 0.62 m (2.03 ft) in width, 0.81 m (2.66 ft) in height.
Discus-2T
"Turbo" variant with 15 metre wingspan and a 15.3 kW (20.5 hp) SOLO 2350 2-stroke, 2 cylinder sustainer engine.
Discus-2c
Production variant with 15 metre or 18 metre wingspan.
Discus-2cT
"Turbo" variant with 15 metre or 18 metre wingspan and a 15.3 kW (20.5 hp) SOLO 2350 2-stroke, 2 cylinder sustainer engine.
Discus-2c FES
Production variant with 15 metre or 18 metre wingspan equipped with a front electric sustainer.

== Specifications (Discus-2a) ==
Data from Schempp-Hirth

General characteristics

- Crew: 1
- Capacity: 200 kg (441 lb) water ballast, plus 7.8 kg (17 lb) in tail-unit tank
- Length: 6.41 m (21 ft 0 in)
- Wingspan: 15 m (49 ft 3 in)
- Height: 1.3 m (4 ft 3 in)
- Wing area: 10.16 m^{2} (109.4 sq ft)
- Aspect ratio: 22.2
- Airfoil: DFVLR HQ
- Empty weight: 242 kg (534 lb)
- Max takeoff weight: 525 kg (1,157 lb)

Performance

- Never exceed speed: 250 km/h (160 mph, 135 kn)
- Max manoeuvring speed: 200 km/h (120 mph; 110 kn)
- Maximum glide ratio: 42
- Rate of sink: 0.59 m/s (116 ft/min)
- Wing loading: 30.7–51.7 kg/m^{2} (6.3–10.6 lb/sq ft)

== See also ==
Aircraft of comparable role, configuration, and era

- Rolladen-Schneider LS8
- Schleicher ASW 28

Related lists

- List of gliders
