= Schleicher ASW 15 =

German single-seat glider, 1968

ASW 15
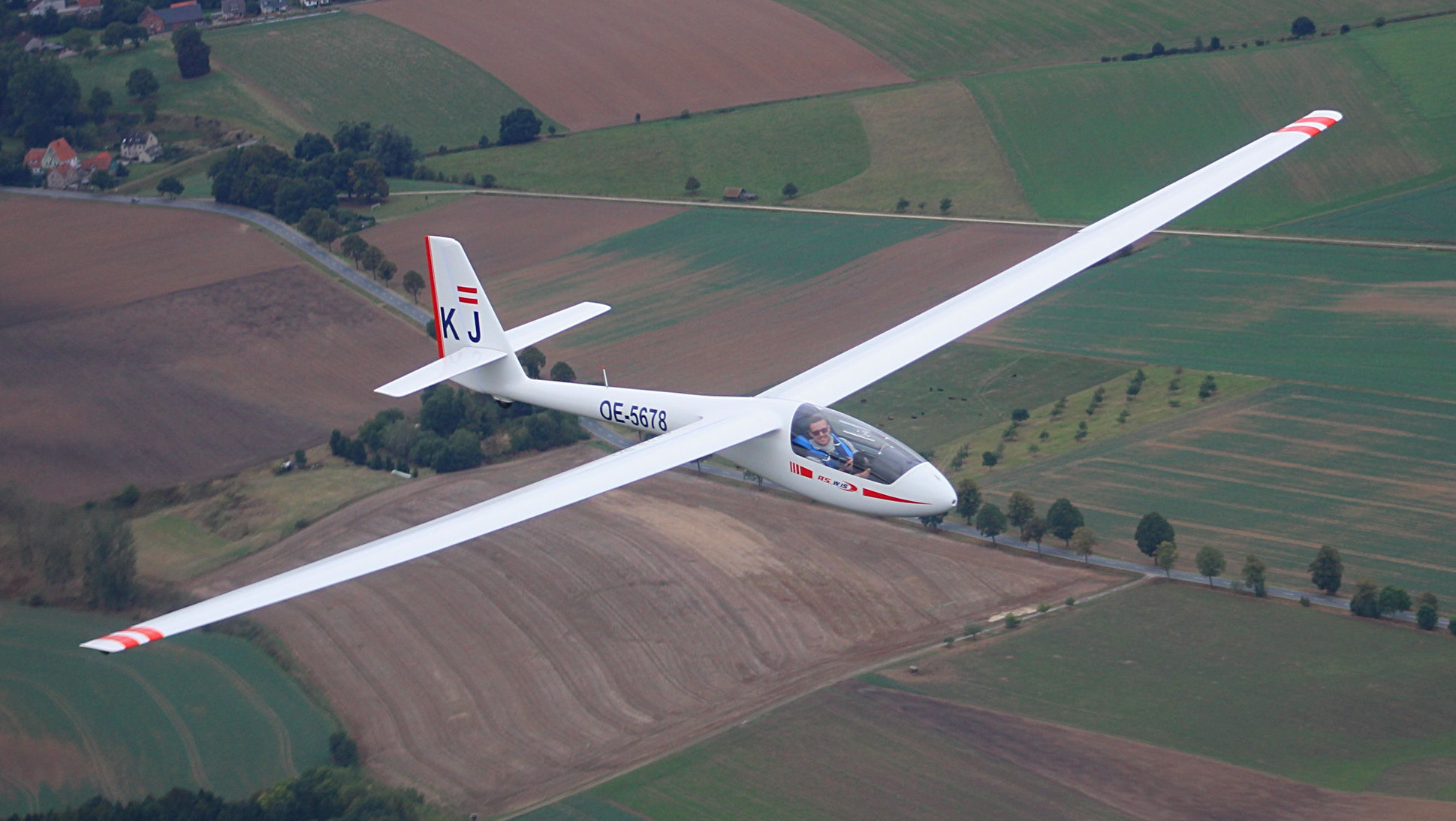

General information
- Type: Sailplane
- National origin: Germany
- Manufacturer: Schleicher
- Designer: Gerhard Waibel
- Status: Most still active with private users and few clubs.
- Number built: c. 453

History
- First flight: c. 1968

The Schleicher ASW 15 is a single-seat sailplane designed in 1968 by Gerhard Waibel and manufactured by Alexander Schleicher GmbH & Co. The ASW 15 has shoulder-mounted wings and an all-flying tailplane, with its single tow-release placement a compromise between winching and aerotowing. The later ASW 15B had several improvements, including a tow-release placed on the plane of symmetry, an 11 cm taller rudder, a slightly larger main wheel, and the provision of a 90-litre water ballast system.

Rot due to fungus infestation was found in an early example, leading to an Airworthiness Directive. Starting with serial number 356, balsa wood was abandoned in the construction in favour of synthetic foam.

In 1971 and 1972, the American pilot Karl Striedieck set world out-and-return distance soaring records three times flying an ASW 15, including one flight of 1,009.854 kilometres (627.494 mi) on October 15, 1972.

It was succeeded by the Schleicher ASW 19.

== Variants ==
ASW 15
Original production version incorporating balsa / fibre-glass sandwich wing construction. Built to pre 1970 Standard class rules the ASW 15 had non-retracting recessed mainwheel and no provision for water ballast; 183 built.
ASW 15B
Second production version with glass-fibre / foam construction, retractable mainwheel and 90 kg (200 lb) water ballast tanks; 270 built.
ASW 15M
One ASW 15 converted to a motor-glider powered by a 300 cc (18 cu in) 22 kW (30 hp) Wankel KM-27 rotary engine, with a 20 L (5.3 US gal; 4.4 imp gal) fuel tank at an empty equipped weight of 288 kg (635 lb)

== Aircraft on display ==
- US Southwest Soaring Museum

== Specifications (ASW 15B) ==
Data from Jane's all the World's Aircraft 1976–77

General characteristics

- Crew: 1
- Capacity: 90 kg (200 lb) water ballast
- Length: 6.48 m (21 ft 3 in)
- Wingspan: 15 m (49 ft 3 in)
- Height: 1.56 m (5 ft 1 in)
- Wing area: 11 m^{2} (120 sq ft)
- Aspect ratio: 20.45
- Airfoil: root : Wortmann FX-61-163; tip : Wortmann FX-60-126 (with 2° washout)
- Empty weight: 230 kg (507 lb)
- Max takeoff weight: 408 kg (899 lb) with 90 kg (200 lb) water ballast

Performance

- Stall speed: 63 km/h (39 mph, 34 kn) at wing loading of 28.9 kg/m^{2} (5.9 lb/sq ft)
- Never exceed speed: 220 km/h (140 mph, 120 kn) at wing loading of 28.9 kg/m^{2} (5.9 lb/sq ft)
- Max rough air speed: 220 km/h (140 mph; 120 kn) at wing loading of 28.9 kg/m^{2} (5.9 lb/sq ft)
- Max aerotow speed: 170 km/h (110 mph; 92 kn) at wing loading of 28.9 kg/m^{2} (5.9 lb/sq ft)
- Max winch launch speed: 120 km/h (75 mph; 65 kn) at wing loading of 28.9 kg/m^{2} (5.9 lb/sq ft)
- g limits: +5.3 -2.65 (design envelope)

+8.4 -5.4 (ultimate load factor with ballast)
+9.2 -6.2 (ultimate load factor without ballast)

- Maximum glide ratio: 36.5 at 90 km/h (56 mph; 49 kn) and wing loading of 28.9 kg/m^{2} (5.9 lb/sq ft)
- Rate of sink: 0.59 m/s (116 ft/min) at 73 km/h (45 mph; 39 kn) and wing loading of 28.9 kg/m^{2} (5.9 lb/sq ft)
- Wing loading: 28.9 kg/m^{2} (5.9 lb/sq ft) without ballast

37.1 kg/m^{2} (7.6 lb/sq ft) with water ballast

== See also ==
Aircraft of comparable role, configuration, and era

- Berkshire Concept 70
- Bölkow Phoebus
- Glasflügel Standard Libelle
- Rolladen-Schneider LS1
- Schempp-Hirth Standard Cirrus

Related lists

- List of gliders
