= C70 =

C70 may refer to:

- Berkshire Concept 70 sailplane
- C_{70} fullerene, carbon-70, a common fullerene, a carbon molecule
- Georges Leygues class frigates, a type of anti-submarine frigates of the French Navy.
- Honda Super Cub C70 motorcycle
- Volvo C70, a car
- Ruy Lopez chess openings ECO code
- Malignant neoplasm of meninges ICD-10 code
- Caldwell 70 (NGC 300), a spiral galaxy in the constellation Sculptor
