= Schleicher ASW 28 =

Single-seat German glider, 2000

ASW 28
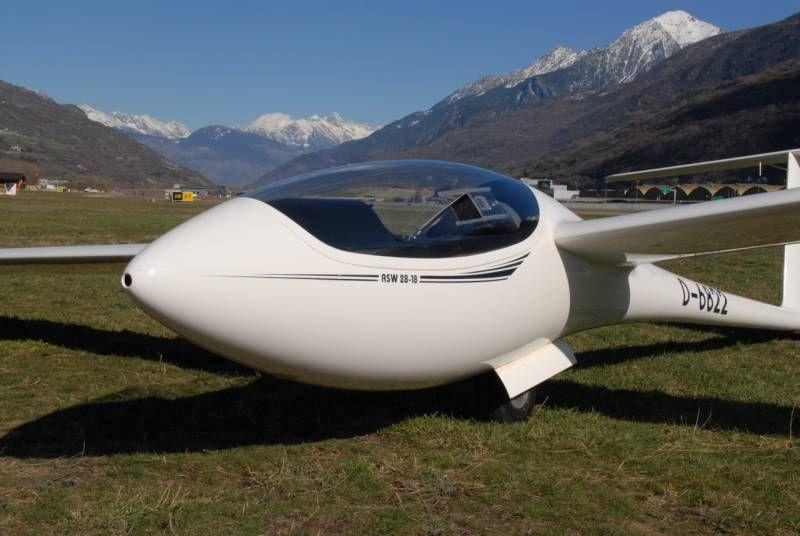
- ASW 28-18

General information
- Type: Standard-class sailplane
- National origin: Germany
- Manufacturer: Schleicher
- Designer: Gerhard Waibel
- Number built: >144

History
- First flight: ca. 2000

The ASW 28 is a Standard Class glider with a fifteen-metre span built of modern fibre reinforced composites. The manufacturer of the ASW-28 is Alexander Schleicher GmbH & Co. The 'W' indicates this is a design of the influential and prolific German designer Gerhard Waibel. Serial production started in 2000.

== Design and development ==
The ASW 28 is a single-seat shoulder-winged composite construction sailplane with a T-shaped horizontal tailplane and 15 metre wingspan. The upper wing surface has Schempp-Hirth airbrakes.

As all Standard Class sailplanes, the ASW-28 does not have flaps or other lift-enhancing devices. It has tall winglets, a retractable undercarriage and a water ballast system. The structure is a complex composite of carbon, aramid and polyethylene fibre reinforced plastic. This permits a light structure with the strength to carry large amounts of water ballast, thus permitting the widest possible range of wing loadings for weak and strong soaring weather.

The ASW-28 supersedes the ASW 24 in the manufacturer's production line. It has – like its competitors Rolladen-Schneider LS8 and Schempp-Hirth Discus-2 – a version with wing extensions for the increasingly popular 18 metre Class, the ASW 28-18. The sustainer (non-self-launching) variant of the 18 metre version is the ASW 28-18 E. The sustainer uses a SOLO 2350 18 hp two-stroke engine.

== Variants ==
ASW 28
Production variant with 15 metre wingspan.
ASW 28-18
Production variant with either a 15 metre or 18 metre span, also optional engine installation.
ASW 28-18 E
Production variant with a 13.2 kW (18 hp) SOLO 2350 2-stroke sustainer engine.

== Specifications (with 15 metre wings) ==
General characteristics

- Crew: One
- Capacity: 200 kg (440 lb) water ballast
- Length: 6.59 m (21 ft 7 in)
- Wingspan: 15 m (49 ft 3 in)
- Height: 1.30 m (4 ft 3 in)
- Wing area: 10.5 m^{2} (113 sq ft)
- Aspect ratio: 21.4
- Airfoil: DU 99-147 and DU 99-125
- Empty weight: 240 kg (528 lb)
- Gross weight: 525 kg (1,155 lb)
- Powerplant: 1 × SOLO 2350 (ASW-28-18E only) , 13 kW (18 hp)

Performance

- Maximum speed: 270 km/h (170 mph, 150 kn)
- Maximum glide ratio: 45
- Rate of sink: 0.56 m/s (110 ft/min)

== See also ==
Aircraft of comparable role, configuration, and era

- Rolladen-Schneider LS8
- Schempp-Hirth Discus-2
- Schleicher ASW 24

Related lists

- List of gliders
- List of civil aircraft
