= Rolladen-Schneider LS7 =

German Standard Class single-seat glider, 1987

LS7
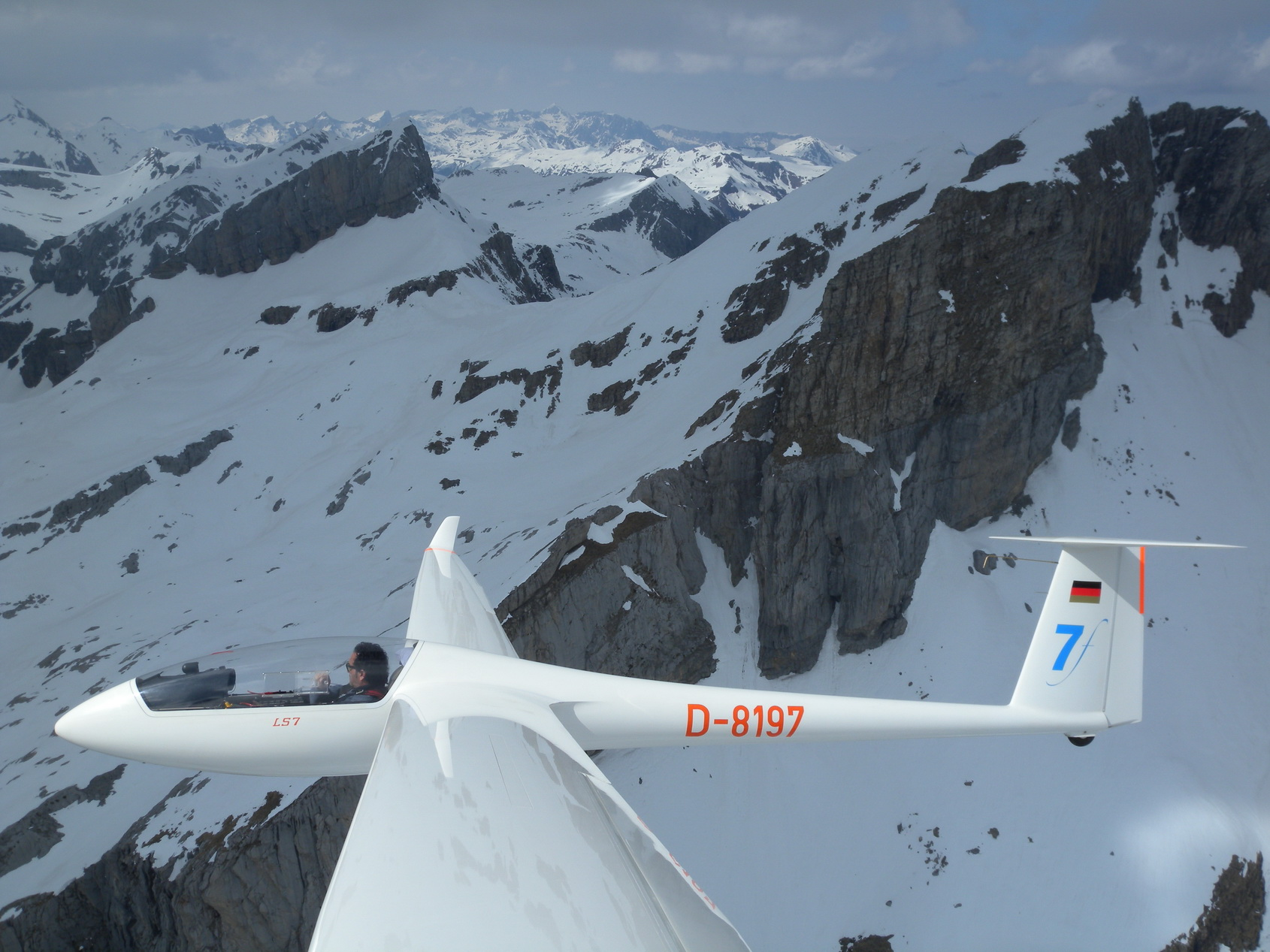

General information
- Type: Standard-class sailplane
- National origin: Germany
- Manufacturer: Rolladen-Schneider
- Designer: Wolf Lemke
- Number built: 164

History
- First flight: 1987

The Rolladen-Schneider LS7 is a high-performance Standard Class single-seat sailplane produced by Rolladen-Schneider Flugzeugbau GmbH from 1988 to 1993.

== Design and development ==
The LS7 was developed as the successor to the LS4, one of the most successful gliders ever produced.

In a departure from the design philosophy of the LS4, Rolladen-Schneider set out to design the LS7 as an uncompromised competition machine, seeking the highest performance possible with the technology of the time. Designer Wolf Lemke specified a highly laminar wing profile and developed a high aspect ratio wing. Carbon fibre was extensively used in the construction, along with aramid fibre, to ensure sufficient strength despite slender structural elements and increased loadings. The aileron drive bellcranks were entirely concealed within the wings, with only 30mm of usable height at the trailing edge.

The LS7 prototype flew for the first time in the autumn of 1987, and serial production started in 1988. Winglets were introduced in 1991, yielding the LS7-WL. Many earlier LS7s were converted to this standard. Production ended in 1993 with a total of 164 aircraft built.

The LS7 did not enjoy the commercial and sporting success its advanced features seemed to warrant. Its higher thermalling speeds proved to be a handicap in the gaggling environment typical of competition gliding.

Other gliders designed at about the same time following a similar design philosophy also revealed non-classic low-speed behaviour, such as the ASW 24 and the DG-600. These gliders climb better in thermals when flown significantly above stall speed and achieve the best cross-country speeds at relatively moderate wing loadings, factors which were not fully understood at first. Although experience over the years has shown these gliders to be equal to any when flown by an expert hand, manufacturers nonetheless have returned to more conservative wing profiles and (mostly) lower aspect ratios.

The LS7 was superseded by the LS8, which is currently manufactured at DG Flugzeugbau GmbH. The LS7 remains a much prized glider among private owners for its excellent performance and very nimble flight characteristics.

The LS7 has more recently begun to achieve competition success in the Club Class, placing 1st in the 2019 European Gliding Championships, Slovakia.

=== Design features ===
- Wings: spar and shell of foam / carbon reinforced plastic sandwich
- Ailerons: synthetic foam / aramid reinforced plastic sandwich. Ailerons extend over fully half the wing span.
- Horizontal stabilizer: sparless sandwich of carbon reinforced plastic
- Elevator: carbon/aramid reinforced plastic
- Automatic connections for ailerons, airbrakes, elevator and water ballast valves
- Integral Teflon and PET film seals on all control surface gaps.
- Water ballast system: one unvented ballast bag per wing located before the spar, valve and dumping orifice on the lower wing shell by the wing root. Glass reinforced ballast tank installed in the tail fin for correction of centre of gravity shifts due to wing ballast.

== Specifications ==
General characteristics

- Crew: One pilot
- Capacity: 170 kg (374 lb) water ballast, plus 5.5 kg (12 lb) in tail
- Length: 6.66 m (21 ft 10 in)
- Wingspan: 15.00 m (49 ft 3 in)
- Height: 1.33 m (4 ft 4 in)
- Wing area: 9.7 m^{2} (104 sq ft)
- Aspect ratio: 23.1
- Empty weight: 234 kg (513 lb)
- Gross weight: 486 kg (1,070 lb)

Performance

- Maximum speed: 270 km/h (170 mph, 150 kn)
- Maximum glide ratio: ca. 43
- Rate of sink: 0.63 m/s (124 ft/min)

== See also ==
Related lists

- List of gliders
