= DG Flugzeugbau DG-800 =

Family of German 15 metre and 18 metre single-seat gliders and motor gliders, 1983

DG-800
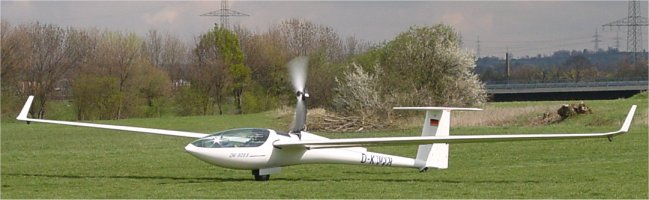
- Self-launch of DG-808B 18 m

General information
- Type: 15 metre- and 18 metre-Class sailplane
- National origin: Germany
- Manufacturer: DG Flugzeugbau
- Number built: 401

History
- First flight: 1993

The DG Flugzeugbau DG-800 series is a family of 15 metre and 18 metre single-seat gliders and motor gliders produced by Glaser-Dirks since 1993 and by DG Flugzeugbau GmbH after 1997. It is the successor to the DG-400 and the DG-600 models.

== Design and development ==
The DG-800 was planned primarily as a powered self-launching sailplane. In the meantime it has spawned many variants, differentiated by the type of powerplant (Rotax, Midwest or Solo), the span extensions (15 metre, 18 metre, both in variants with or without winglets), maximum allowed take-off mass, etc.

The newest model is the DG-808C, a self launching sailplane with a Solo 2625 engine and the new designed "DEI-NT" Engine Control System.

There are also unpowered variants, the DG-800S and DG-808S, aimed at competition flying. These pure glider variants have a shorter and lighter fuselage built in the moulds of the DG-600 and allow a broader range of wing loadings.

== Specifications (Competition DG-808C with 18-metre wings) ==
General characteristics

- Crew: One pilot
- Capacity: 156 kg (343 lb) water ballast
- Length: 7.06 m (23 ft 2 in)
- Wingspan: 18.00 m (59 ft 1 in)
- Height: 1.35 m (4 ft 5 in)
- Wing area: 11.8 m^{2} (127 sq ft)
- Aspect ratio: 27.4
- Empty weight: 344 kg (757 lb)
- Gross weight: 600 kg (1,320 lb)
- Powerplant: 1 × Solo , 40 kW (53 hp)

Performance

- Maximum speed: 270 km/h (170 mph, 150 kn)
- Maximum glide ratio: 50 (51.5 with winglets)
- Rate of climb: 5.2 m/s (1,000 ft/min)
- Rate of sink: 0.50 m/s (98 ft/min)

== See also ==
Related lists

- List of gliders
