= Schleicher ASW 17 =

German single-seat glider, 1971

ASW 17

General information
- Type: Open-class sailplane
- National origin: Germany
- Manufacturer: Schleicher
- Designer: Gerhard Waibel
- Number built: 55

History
- First flight: 17 July 1971

External image
- Schleicher ASW 17 landing with the aid of air brakes and a braking parachute

The Schleicher ASW 17 is a single-seat Open Class sailplane that was built by the German manufacturer Alexander Schleicher GmbH & Co and first flew in 1971. It replaced the ASW 12, and was replaced in 1981 by the ASW 22.

== Design and development ==
The ASW 17 was designed by Gerhard Waibel, supposedly as a development of the Schleicher ASW 12, but was an entirely new design. The wing is in four sections. The camber-changing flaps are connected to the ailerons. It has Schempp-Hirth airbrakes plus an optional tail parachute. It first flew on 17 July 1971 and 55 were built before production stopped in 1976.

The ASW17 was succeeded by the ASW22.

== Variants ==
In addition to the regular ASW 17, there is an ASW 17S which was a 21-metre span version built in 1973 but this was later reduced to 20m. The ASW 17X was also a single aircraft that was built in 1976 with 19-metre span. One other was modified to 23 metres after production.

== Competition history ==
ASW 17s came second in the World Gliding Championships in 1972, third in 1974. George Lee won in 1976 and in 1978 in an ASW 17. Hans-Werner Grosse broke several world records in his ASW 17 including: the record goal flight at 1,231 km in 1974, the triangular distance record 1,063 km in 1977 and then again at 1,306.9 km, and the 1,250 km speed triangle at 133.24 km/h in 1980. Karl Striedeck broke another record by a flight of 1,634.7 km out and return in 1977 in an ASW 17.

== Specifications (ASW 17) ==
General characteristics

- Crew: One
- Capacity: 100 kg (220 lb) water ballast
- Length: 7.55 m (24 ft 9 in)
- Wingspan: 20.00 m (65 ft 7 in)
- Height: 1.86 m (6 ft 1 in)
- Wing area: 14.8 m^{2} (159 sq ft)
- Aspect ratio: 27
- Airfoil: Root: Wortmann FX 62-K-131 thickened to 14.4% Mid: FX 62-K-131 Tip: FX 60-126
- Empty weight: 415 kg (913 lb)
- Gross weight: 610 kg (1,340 lb)

Performance

- Maximum speed: 250 km/h (155 mph, 135 kn)
- Maximum glide ratio: 48.5 at 56 kts
- Rate of sink: 0.49 m/s (96 ft/min)

== See also ==
Aircraft of comparable role, configuration, and era

- LAK-9
- Schempp-Hirth Nimbus-2

Related lists

- List of gliders
