= Glaser-Dirks DG-600 =

German single-seat glider, 1987

DG-600
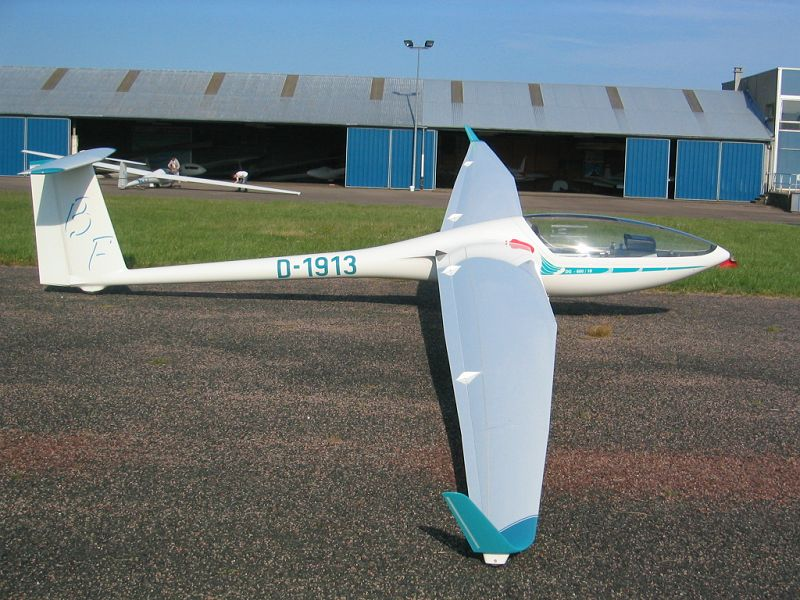

General information
- Type: 15 and 18 metre class sailplane
- National origin: Germany
- Manufacturer: Glaser-Dirks/DG Flugzeugbau
- Number built: 114

History
- First flight: 1987

The Glaser-Dirks DG-600 is a glider manufactured by Glaser-Dirks as a successor to the DG-202 and DG-400 series of gliders where carbon fiber reinforced plastics was used.

== Design and development ==
The DG-600 fuselage is based on the fuselage of the DG-400 but with a more slender tailboom which also incorporates a tailfin ballast tank with a capacity of 7 liters. The design of the canopy and the instrument panel is practically the same as on other DG gliders.

The control surfaces incorporate flaperons which serve as both flaps and ailerons. The wing has a newly designed thinner airfoil and higher aspect ratio than previous types of DG gliders. This gives a higher performance but at a cost of worse slow-speed characteristics, making it less suitable for gliding competitions with frequent gaggles in thermals. The same problem is also noticeable on LS-7 and ASW-24 gliders, where improved performance was to be achieved with thinner airfoils.

The negative effects (i.e. a stall without much warning) of this design are most pronounced on 15-meter wingspan without winglets. These characteristics caused the relative unpopularity of this glider and only 114 aircraft were produced (partially because the moulds were later destroyed in a factory fire). Later versions with 17 and 18 m wingspan offer much better low-speed handling.

== Variants ==
DG-600/15
original version with 15 m wingspan
DG-600/17
version with 17 m wingspan (later changed to 18 m)
DG-600M
with Rotax 275 engine, capable of self launching
DG-600/18
DG-600M
DG-600/18M

== Specifications (15m wings) ==
Data from Jane's All the World's Aircraft 1988-89

General characteristics

- Crew: 1
- Length: 6.83 m (22 ft 5 in)
- Wingspan: 15 m (49 ft 3 in)
- Height: 1.35 m (4 ft 5 in)
- Wing area: 10.95 m^{2} (117.9 sq ft)
- Aspect ratio: 20.55
- Airfoil: root;HQ-35; tip:HQ-37
- Empty weight: 255 kg (562 lb)
- Max takeoff weight: 525 kg (1,157 lb)
- Water ballast: 180 L (48 US gal; 40 imp gal) in two wing tanks + 7 L (1.8 US gal; 1.5 imp gal) in fin tank for trimming.

Performance

- Stall speed: 64 km/h (40 mph, 35 kn)
- Never exceed speed: 270 km/h (170 mph, 150 kn) in smooth air

200 km/h (110 kn; 120 mph) in rough air
200 km/h (110 kn; 120 mph) on aero-tow
150 km/h (81 kn; 93 mph) on winch launch

- g limits: +5.8 -3.8
- Maximum glide ratio: 46
- Rate of sink: 0.56 m/s (110 ft/min)
- Wing loading: 47.94 kg/m^{2} (9.82 lb/sq ft) max

NOTE: The following data represent later versions of DG-600

	DG-600/15	DG-600/18
Crew	1	1
Maiden flight	14 January 1992	14 January 1992
Competition class	FAI 15 m	FAI 18 m
Wing sections	HQ35/HQ37	HQ35/HQ37
Wing span	15 m (49 ft)	18 m (59 ft)
Length	6.83 m (22.4 ft)	6.83 m (22.4 ft)
Wing surface	10.95 m^{2} (117.9 sq ft)	11.81 m^{2} (127.1 sq ft)
Aspect ratio	20.55	27.42
Empty mass	257 kg (567 lb)257 kg	262 kg (578 lb)
Maximum mass	525 kg (1,157 lb)	480 kg (1,060 lb)
Water ballast	187 kg (412 lb)	187 kg (412 lb)
Wing loading (max. payload)	47,9 kg/m^{2}	40,6 kg/m^{2}
Stall speed	64 km/h (35 kn; 40 mph)	62 km/h (33 kn; 39 mph)
Sink rate	0.56 m/s (110 ft/min)	0.49 m/s (96 ft/min)
L/D	45	50

== See also ==
- List of gliders
