= LAK-9 =

Sailplane

LAK-9 Lietuva
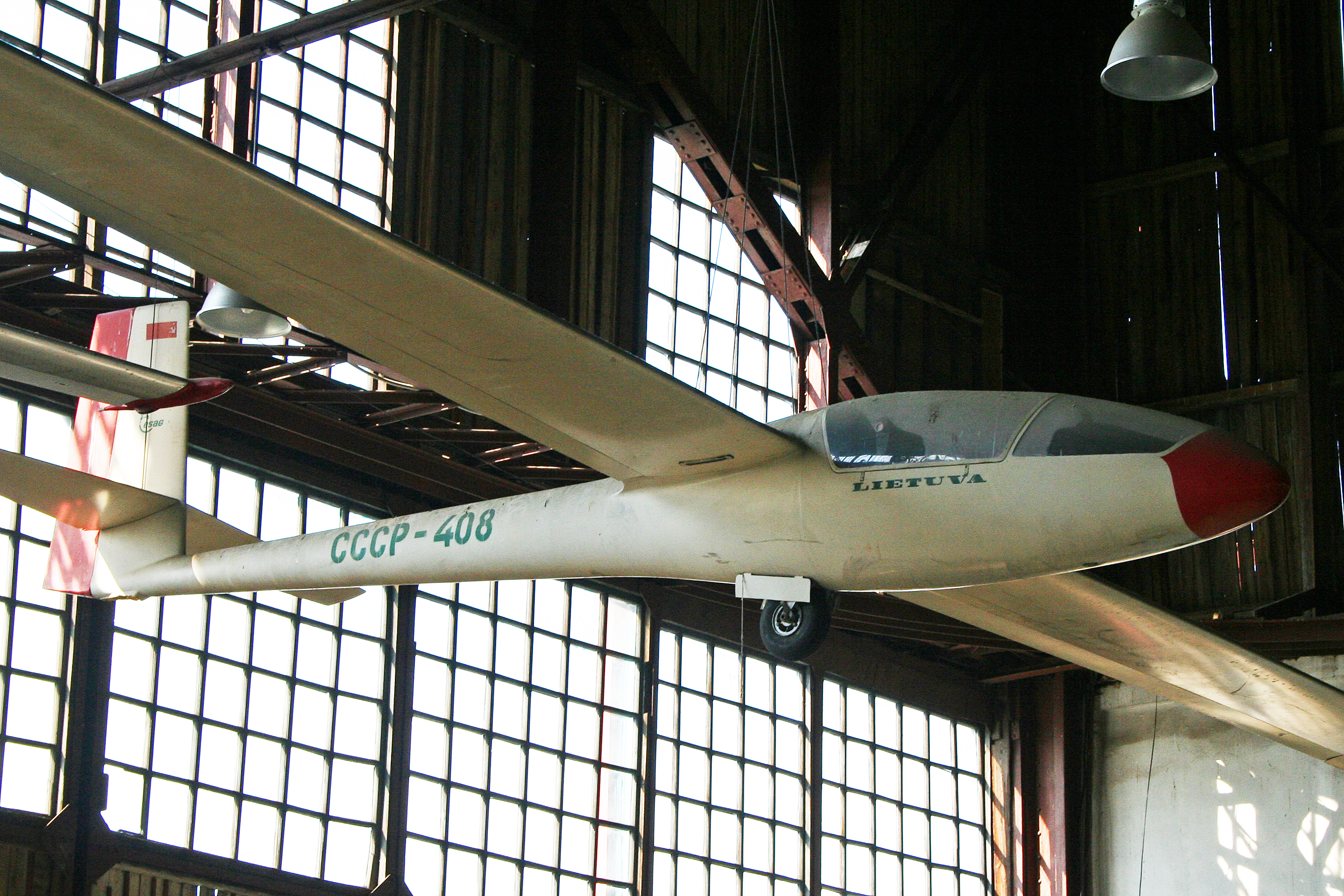

General information
- Type: Open-class sailplane
- National origin: Soviet Union
- Manufacturer: LAK
- Designer: Kęstutis Gečas
- Number built: 8

History
- First flight: 1976

The LAK-9 Lietuva (English: Lithuania) was an open-class competition sailplane produced in the Soviet Union in the 1970s. It was based on the LAK BK-7 that had been produced in small numbers since 1972. Like it, the LAK-9 was a conventional sailplane design with a high-set cantilever wing and a conventional empennage. The landing gear consisted of a retractable monowheel and a tailwheel, and construction throughout was of fibreglass.

The type came to the attention of the West when a LAK-9 was flown in the 1976 Gliding World Championships in Finland, the first entry by the Soviet Union since 1968. Piloted by O. Pasetnik, it was withdrawn from competition due to aileron damage.

The fourth batch to be produced was designated the LAK-9M (for "Modernised"), and a motorglider version was also produced.

== Specifications (LAK-9) ==
Data from Jane's All the World's Aircraft 1977–78

General characteristics

- Crew: 1
- Capacity: 100 L (22 imp gal; 26 US gal) water ballast
- Length: 7.27 m (23 ft 10 in)
- Wingspan: 20.02 m (65 ft 8 in)
- Height: 1.53 m (5 ft 0 in)
- Wing area: 14.99 m^{2} (161.4 sq ft)
- Aspect ratio: 26.8:1
- Empty weight: 380 kg (838 lb)
- Gross weight: 580 kg (1,279 lb)

Performance

- Maximum speed: 210 km/h (130 mph, 110 kn)
- Stall speed: 64 km/h (40 mph, 35 kn)
- Maximum glide ratio: 48
- Rate of sink: 0.51 m/s (100 ft/min)

== See also ==
Aircraft of comparable role, configuration, and era

- Schempp-Hirth Nimbus-2
- Schleicher ASW 17

Related lists

- List of gliders
