= Schleicher ASW 24 =

Single-seat German glider, 1987

Schleicher ASW24
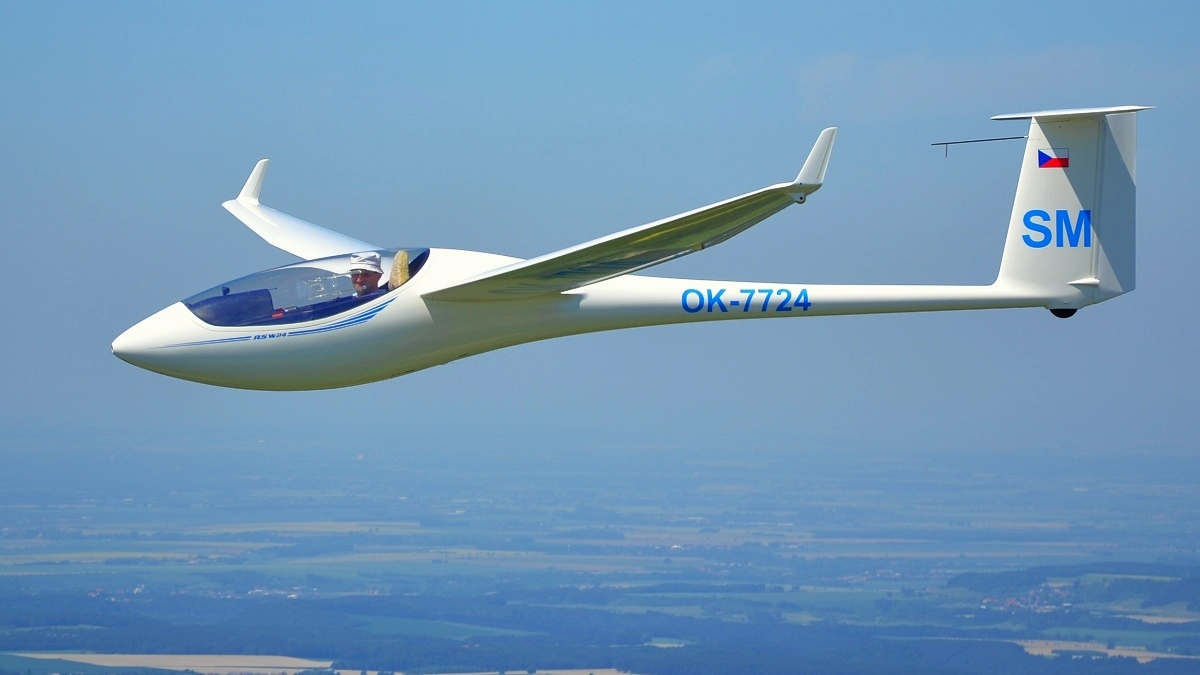

General information
- Type: Standard-class sailplane
- Manufacturer: Alexander Schleicher
- Designer: Gerhard Waibel
- Number built: 221

History
- Manufactured: 1988–1993
- First flight: 1987

The ASW 24 is a modern single-seat high-performance composite Standard Class sailplane. It is manufactured in Germany by Alexander Schleicher GmbH & Co.

== History ==
The ASW 24 was designed by Schleicher's Gerhard Waibel, with Delft University professor Loek Boermans undertaking the role of aerodynamicist. The prototype made its first flight in 1987 and entered serial production later the same year. It nominally remained in production until 2000, although only a score were built in the mid-to-late 1990s.

It entailed a large development effort, as it was a complete departure from the preceding ASW 19 and pioneered several successful innovations. The fuselage, airfoils, wings and empennage were completely new, as well as many systems, e.g. the electrical ballast management. The structure employed a large amount of the then still exotic carbon fibre. The OSTIV Award-winning safety cockpit made use of an organic shape, tall sidewalls, crumple zones and exotic aramid fibres for crash protection. A large wheel with a disc brake and a large canopy with excellent visibility were other strong points of the type.

The ASW 24 was moderately successful in competitions. It won a single World Championship in 2001, fourteen years after its market launch. Like the contemporary LS7, the ASW 24 overstretched the technology available at the time: it has excellent performance in the cruise but less so in the slow flight range. The higher-than-usual thermalling speed revealed itself a disadvantage in the typical competition gaggles, and its performance degrades somewhat when subject to turbulence, rain or wing contamination. However, the addition of winglets and a change to the outer wing leading edge, making it slightly blunter (both of which have been applied to many earlier ASW 24s), improved these characteristics significantly. Third-party winglets available in the U.S. market, one of which is approved by the factory, brought the ASW 24 fully up to parity with its competitors. One unintended bonus of the design of the spar and use of aramid fibre in the wing is the wing profile is unusually stable over time. ASW 24s that are 25+ years old still have excellent airfoil profile integrity.

According to World Champion Sarah Steinberg, it needs to be always proactively flown in thermals, thus imposing a higher workload upon the pilot. Notwithstanding, the aesthetically pleasing ASW 24 is a comfortable, safe and pleasant sailplane with high cross-country performance that remains competitive up to national championship level in most countries.

The fuselage of the ASW 24 was the basis, with small modifications, for the subsequent ASW 27, ASW 28 and ASG 29. It was superseded in production by the ASW 28.

== Variants ==
- The ASW 24B of 1993 introduced winglets and a slightly revised airfoil that were partially successful in addressing the handling and performance issues.
- The ASW 24E is a nominally self-launching variant employing a Rotax 275 engine and a propeller mounted on a retractable pylon. The engine installation is peculiar for its small size and power, more typical of a turbo, and for its manual start with a pilot-operated ripcord.

== Specifications (ASW 24) ==
Data from Jane's All the World's Aircraft 1988-89

General characteristics

- Crew: 1
- Length: 6.55 m (21 ft 6 in)
- Wingspan: 15 m (49 ft 3 in)
- Height: 1.3 m (4 ft 3 in)
- Wing area: 10 m^{2} (110 sq ft)
- Aspect ratio: 22.5
- Airfoil: DU 84-158
- Empty weight: 230 kg (507 lb) ,
  ASW 24E 275 kg (606 lb))
- Max takeoff weight: 500 kg (1,102 lb)
- Water ballast: 155 kg (342 lb)
  ASW 24B 160 kg (353 lb)
- Cockpit width: 0.64 m (2.10 ft)
- Cockpit height: 0.81 m (2.66 ft)

ASW 24E

- Powerplant: 1 × Rotax 275 1 cylinder 2-stroke retractable piston engine, 19 kW (25 hp)
- Propellers: 2-bladed fixed pitch propeller

Performance

- Stall speed: 69 km/h (43 mph, 37 kn)
- Never exceed speed: 280 km/h (170 mph, 150 kn) in smooth air
  205 km/h (111 kn; 127 mph) in rough air
  205 km/h (111 kn; 127 mph) on aero-tow
  140 km/h (76 kn; 87 mph) on winch launch
- g limits: +5.3 -2.65
- Maximum glide ratio: 43.5 at 105 km/h (57 kn; 65 mph)
  ASW 24B 44 at 105 km/h (57 kn; 65 mph)
- Rate of sink: 0.57 m/s (112 ft/min) at 70 km/h (38 kn; 43 mph) at 31 kg/m^{2} (6.3 lb/sq ft)
- Wing loading: 50 kg/m^{2} (10 lb/sq ft)
- Min loading: 30.5 kg/m^{2} (6.2 lb/sq ft)

== See also ==
Aircraft of comparable role, configuration, and era

- Glaser-Dirks DG-300
- PZL Bielsko SZD-55
- Rolladen-Schneider LS7
- Schempp-Hirth Discus

Related lists

- List of civil aircraft
- List of gliders
