= Rotax 275 =

Austrian two-stroke aircraft engine

275
- Type: Piston aero-engine
- National origin: Austria
- Manufacturer: Rotax
- Major applications: Self-launching Gliders]

The Rotax 275 is a 24 hp (18 kW), single-cylinder, two-stroke aircraft engine, built by BRP-Rotax GmbH & Co. KG of Austria for use in Self-launched Gliders.

== Design ==
The Rotax 275 is a single-cylinder two-stroke engine with an air-cooled cylinder head and cylinder. It has a single magneto ignition with a gear driven propeller. It was certified in Austria in November 1988.

== Applications ==
- Glaser-Dirks DG-600M
- Schleicher ASH 25E
- Schleicher ASW 24E

== Specifications (275) ==
Data from EASA Type Certificate

=== General characteristics ===
- Type: two-stroke air-cooled aeroengine
- Bore: 72 mm (2.83 in)
- Stroke: 66 mm (2.60 in)
- Displacement: 268.7 cc (16.40 cu in)
- Dry weight: 25 kg (complete with muffler and starter)

=== Components ===
- Fuel type: two-stroke mixture
- Cooling system: free air

=== Performance ===
- Power output: 17.6 kW (26 hp) at 7000 L/min
