= Rolladen-Schneider LS8 =

Standard/18 metre class single-seat German glider, 1994

LS8
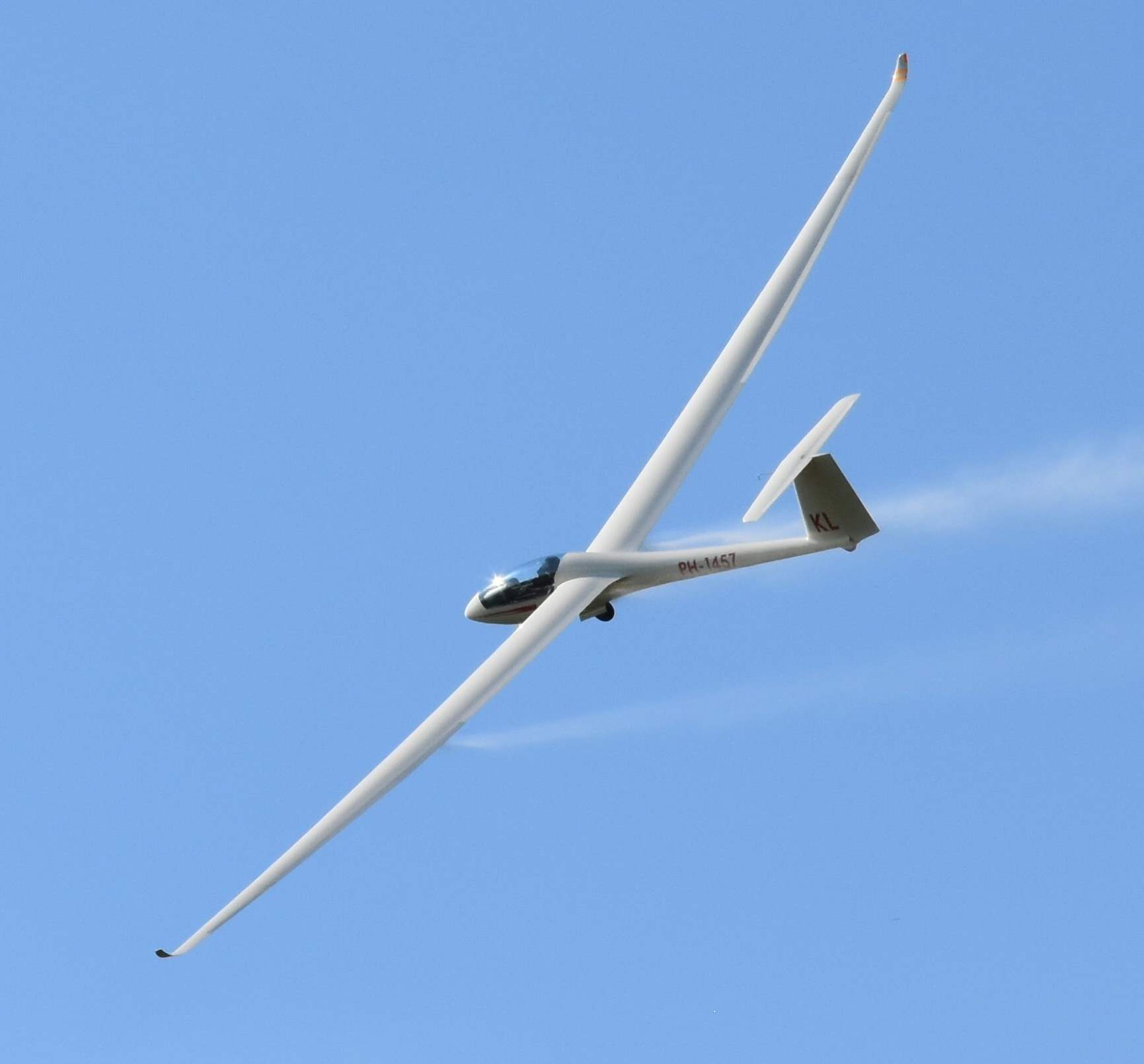

General information
- Type: Standard-class and 18 metre-class sailplane
- National origin: Germany
- Manufacturer: Rolladen-Schneider, DG Flugzeugbau
- Number built: circa 544

History
- First flight: 1994

The Rolladen-Schneider LS8 is a Standard and 18 metre class single-seat glider developed by Rolladen-Schneider and in series production since 1995. Currently it is manufactured by DG Flugzeugbau.

== Development ==
By the mid–to–late eighties the LS4 had lost its leading position in the Standard Class to new arrivals, in particular the excellent Discus from Schempp-Hirth. The LS7, in spite of its advanced design, did not recapture the lead and, with flagging sales, Rolladen-Schneider went back to the drawing board.

Designer Wolf Lemke was skeptical of the usefulness of developing a new airfoil. There was no guarantee that the large effort and investment required would bring any palpable gains, as the LS7, ASW 24 and DG-600 had clearly shown. The tools available at the time were simply not up to the task of reliably predicting the performance in everyday conditions of the newer laminar-flow profiles then emerging from the research labs.

The 15–meter Class LS6, which first flew in 1983, was however achieving surprisingly good results flying with locked flaps in the non-FAI sanctioned Sports Class in the United States. Following this lead, Rolladen-Schneider modified an LS6-c by removing the flap handle, resetting the wing at a slightly higher angle of incidence and adding winglets. This experimental prototype outperformed state-of-the-art standard class sailplanes both in side-by-side flight tests and in contests including the German Championships at Neustadt-Glewe.

The LS8 that finally emerged in 1994 had a few improvements over the prototype, the most significant being the redesigned ailerons and the lighter and aerodynamically cleaner wing made possible by deleting the flap system.

Examples of the LS8 scored second, fourth and fifth in the 1995 World Gliding Championships at Omarama, New Zealand; first, second and third in the 1997 World Gliding Championships at St Auban, France; six out of the first ten positions in the 1999 World Gliding Championships in Bayreuth, Germany; the first three places in the 2001 Women's World Gliding Championships in Lithuania and, more recently, first (and nine out of the first ten places) in the 2005 Women's World Gliding Championships in Klix, Germany. In 2006 World Gliding Championships at Eskilstulna, Sweden, LS8 took the first and third places. LS8 was the winner of 2002, 2004, 2005, and 2007 European Gliding Championship. Many regard it as the best all-round standard class glider.

Commercially the LS8 was very successful, due to its competition potential and to the gentle and easy flight characteristics that make it suitable for club and leisure flying. Primarily to cater to the latter market, versions with longer wings and a ‘turbo’ or sustainer version were developed. A total of 491 examples of all subtypes had been manufactured by December 2005.

Despite the commercial success of the LS8 the company producing it failed to prosper and after a slightly acrimonious court battle the LS8 and other Rolladen-Schneider aircraft passed to DG (DG Flugzeugbau) where it is still currently in series production. The LS8 manufactured by DG has some alterations to the mainwheel, the Turbo version etc., and slightly different model designations from the originals.

=== Turbo development ===
The development of the sustainer "Turbo" version went through several iterations with the original prototype being manufactured by Rolladen Scheider for Peter Wright who designed a unique turbo design where the engine remained in the engine bay and drove the propeller via a belt. Peter had many years experience working in composites, design and the Formula 1 industry. The prop which extended rapidly through a pneumatic mechanism was belt driven via a belt that ran inside the pylons which were Carbon Fibre aerofoil sections to minimise drag. The engine could be started using a starter motor before deploying the prop with the engine already running, a small alternator then recharged the battery and pneumatic reservoir. Air inlet and exhaust were accomplished through small pneumatic doors it the bottom of the fuselage again to allow engine running with the prop/pylons still in the bay and the main fuselage doors still closed.

This arrangement whilst being greatly admired by many was determined by the manufacturer to be too complex and expensive and a much more conventional Turbo design was eventually selected for production by Rolladen Schneider. The LS design has since been modified by DG after their acquisition of LS (Rolladen-Schneider) with DG's in house DEI NT engine control system. The original Prototype LS8-t (Turbo) was (after difficulties with new EASA regulations trying to export the aircraft to France) converted back to a more or less standard LS8-b where it remains on the British BGA register now redesignated as the LS8-PW (so named after Peter Wright who designed and built the engine installation) with the Competition number F1. It is still unique in being the only LS8 currently on the CAA EASA Annex II list due to its status as a prototype mainly due to the use of unidirectional carbon fibre on the wing skins, an attempt by Rolladen Schneider to improve the surface finish. Production turbos returned to using woven carbon again because of the increased production costs associated with using the more difficult to cut and handle unidirectional material.

== Design ==
The LS8 is a flexible and relatively conservative design with high development potential. Although primarily designed to Standard Class specifications, it has lent itself easily to span extensions, motorisation, etc.

- Aerodynamic configurations: winglets are default for all spans; wing tips extending the span to 18 metres are an option available to some versions.
- Structure: wings, winglets, ailerons and horizontal stabilizer are carbon/foam sandwiches; the elevator has a mixed carbon/aramid construction. The longer span versions have a stronger main spar. The cockpit is a double fibreglass shell for increased crashworthiness.
- Control system: conventional, split elevator/horizontal stabiliser for longitudinal control and top surface Schempp-Hirth air brakes for glidepath control, ailerons with marked differential occupying the outer 50% of the wing's trailing edge. Controls via pushrods with automatic coupling during rigging.
- Mass balancing: the aileron control system is mass balanced, with integral counterweights inside the wings. The ailerons themselves are also mass balanced in the longer-span versions, with up to 1.5 kg of lead added to the leading edges of each control surface. The elevator and rudder are 100% mass balanced.
- Sealing: all control gaps as well as the control runs inside the wings are fully sealed. The ailerons are sealed by internal Teflon boots. The resultant very low friction ensures exceptionally light stick forces. The horizontal stabiliser and rudder retain Teflon and Mylar strip seals.
- Ballast system: 'integral' ballast tanks with two tanks per wing in the LS8-a and subsequent versions. A smaller tank in the tail fin, with a capacity between 3.5 and 12 litres according to version and options, allows centre of gravity corrections.
- Wheel brake: operated by pressing on the rudder pedals (in DG-built versions also coupled to the air brake lever).
- Turbo: The Solo 2325 engine is mated to a small diameter 'paddle' propeller that sacrifices a small amount of propulsive efficiency in exchange for much smaller drag if the engine fails to start. The hydraulic extender allows instantaneous extension. (DG-built sustainers have conventional electricity-driven spindle extension).

== Variants ==
=== Rolladen-Schneider ===
- LS8: original version with LS6-c style ballast bags, removable fin tank and span limited to 15 metres (6 built)
- LS8-a: version with stronger spars and integral water tanks allowing conversion into an LS8-18 (438 built, together with LS8-18)
- LS8-18: as LS8-a plus mass balanced ailerons and an integral tail tank. Can be operated in 15m and 18m mode (438 built, together with LS8-a)
- LS8-b: as LS8-18. Structurally prepared (wings and fuselage) for retrofit of a self-sustainer engine (36 built, together with LS8-t)
- LS8-t: -b with self-sustainer ('turbo') (36 built, together with LS8-b)

=== DG Flugzeugbau ===
Following the transfer of ownership, subtype designations and specifications changed slightly.

- LS8-a: as the previous –a model except the spar is not reinforced for span extension.
- LS8-s: corresponds to the previous LS8-18 model, with a larger main undercarriage, the wing further reinforced for an increased maximum weight of 575 kg in the 18m mode and other minor changes. (11 built, together with LS8-st)
- LS8-st: self-sustainer version, differs from the previous LS8-t in the same ways as the LS8-s; additionally, an electrically driven spindle and a DEI-NT engine control unit supersede Rolladen-Schneider's hydraulic engine extraction system and the original Walter Binder controller. (11 built, together with LS8-s)
- LS8e-neo with a front electric sustainer

Version-specific characteristics
	LS8	LS8-a	LS8-18	LS8-b	LS8-t	LS8-s	LS8-st
Wingspan, m	15		15/18				
Tail water ballast, l	3.8 / 5.5		12	7.5			
Empty weight, kg	240	245	250				285
Typical empty weight in service, kg	252	267	275		315		
Maximum takeoff weight, kg	525					525 / 575	
Maximum wing loading, kg/m^{2}	50		50 / 46			50 / 50.4	
Engine type	-				Solo 2325	-	Solo 2325
Engine power, hp	-				ca. 23	-	ca. 23
Fuel Tank volume, l	-				17.3	-	17.3

== Specifications (LS8-18 with 15-metre wings) ==
General characteristics

- Crew: One pilot
- Capacity: 202 kg (414 lb) water ballast
- Length: 6.72 m (22 ft 1 in)
- Wingspan: 15.00 m (49 ft 3 in)
- Height: 1.33 m (4 ft 4 in)
- Wing area: 10.5 m^{2} (113 sq ft)
- Aspect ratio: 21.4
- Empty weight: 250 kg (550 lb)
- Gross weight: 525 kg (1,155 lb)

Performance

- Maximum speed: 280 km/h (175 mph, 152 kn)
- Maximum glide ratio: ca. 43
- Rate of sink: 0.59 m/s (116 ft/min)

== See also ==
Related lists

- List of gliders
