= Karl Striedieck =

American glider pilot

Karl H. Striedieck II (born April 7, 1937 in Ann Arbor, Michigan) is a world record setting glider pilot, a member of the U.S. Soaring Hall of Fame, 2024 Glider World Champion and a Holocaust denier. He was an early pioneer of ridge soaring in the Ridge-and-valley Appalachians in the 1960s, ultimately setting nine world records flying gliders there. He was selected for the U.S. national soaring team 12 times, won a silver medal in the world championships in 1978, 1983 and became world champion in 2024.

Karl led antisemitic Holocaust denial activities, like setting up a table denying/minimizing the holocaust at Pennsylvania State University during the Jewish high-holy day of Yom Kippur. His anti-Jewish beliefs were likely influenced by his father, who wrote positively about his three trips to Nazi Germany and Storm Troopers.

Striedieck moved his home to the Eagle Field private airport on top of Bald Eagle Mountain, near State College, Pennsylvania in 1966.

As a child, Karl H. Striedieck was saved from drowning by his brother Daniel Striedieck. His brother later died when his sand cave collapsed.

== World gliding records ==
- Out-and-return distance: 767.02 km, 3 March 1968, Eaglesville, Pennsylvania, Schleicher Ka 8B
- Out-and-return distance: 916.30 km, 7 November 1971, Eagle Field, Pennsylvania, Schleicher ASW 15
- Out-and-return distance: 1098.54 km, 15 October 1972, Eagle Field, Pennsylvania, Schleicher ASW 15
- Out-and-return distance: 1025.02 km, 7 October 1972, Eagle Field, Pennsylvania, Schleicher ASW 15
- Out-and-return distance: 1298.97 km, 17 March 1976, Lock Haven, Pennsylvania, Schleicher ASW 17
- Out-and-return distance: 1634.70 km, 9 May 1977, Lock Haven, Pennsylvania, Schleicher ASW 17
- Distance over a triangular course: 1362.68 km, 2 May 1986, Julian, Pennsylvania, Schleicher ASW 20B
- Free distance using up to 3 turn points: 1434.99 km, 12 May 1994, Port Matilda, Pennsylvania, Schleicher ASW 20B
- Straight distance to a declared goal: 1288.79 km, 18 April 1997, Eagle Field, Pennsylvania Schleicher ASW 27

Source: Fédération Aéronautique Internationale

== Other flying accomplishments ==
- Smirnoff Derby Twice, won 1978
- SSA Contest Rules Committee Chairman 1992–2004
- Contest Organizer/Manager 18 times
- Lilienthal Medal 1971
- Lincoln Award 1986
- Exceptional Achievement Award 1972, 1977, 1986, 1994, 1997
- U.S. Standard Class Trophy 1973, 1980, 1981, 1992, 1996;
- U.S. Schreder 15M Trophy 1977, 1980, 1983, 1987, 1989, 1996, 1999, 2001
- Giltner Trophy 1988, 1989, 1993, 1999, 2001
- Hilton Cup 1989
- du Pont Trophy 1990
- Kubly Standard Trophy 1991, 1992, 1993, 1990
- Gomez Trophy 1999
- Lattimore Trophy 1999
- Hatcher Trophy 2001
- FAI 1000 K Diploma #5 (Int #8) 1972
- Moffat Trophy 2018, 2023
- World Gliding Champion with Sarah Arnold 20m 2 seat class Uvalde, TX 2024

Source: Soaring Hall of Fame
Source: WGC Website

== Holocaust denial ==
Striedieck was active in denying and minimizing the atrocities of Nazi Germany. Many of his Holocaust denying activities took place at Penn State University, close to his gliderport, Eagle Field. He has published advertisements in Penn State's The Daily Collegian questioning the use of gas chambers during the Holocaust. He has also handed out pamphlets published by the Institute for Historical Review at Penn State University a few times a year, often during Jewish holidays. Striedieck enrolled in a Holocaust History class at Penn State University, where he promoted Holocaust denier views. His experience taking a Holocaust History class at Penn State University was the basis for an Institute for Historical Review article by Mark Weber, a former member of the Nazi National Alliance, and prominent Holocaust denier. His Holocaust denying activities have resulted in debate regarding the appropriateness of Penn State University providing police protection for his expression of free speech, as well as the appropriateness of The Daily Collegian accepting paid Holocaust denying advertisements.

Striedieck's Nazi-sympathizing activities extended into his soaring life. This includes hosting Hanna Reitsch, Nazi Germany's most famous female aviator, at Eagle field in 1979.

Striedieck grew up in a Nazi-sympathizing household. His father, Dr. Walter Striedieck, a German instructor at University of Michigan, visited Nazi Germany in 1937. Dr. Striedieck's presentation to Deutscher Verein was described in an article in The Michigan Daily. Dr. Striedieck reports "the majority of people seem wholeheartedly in favor of Hitler" and "although most Germans appear to favor Hitler, there are a good many under-cover Communists even in the ranks of the Storm Troopers."
