= DTGL Sant' Ambrogio =

Sant' Ambrogio

General information
- Type: Single seat glider
- National origin: Italy
- Designer: Gian Luigi Della Torre
- Number built: 5

History
- First flight: 1938

The DTGL Sant' Ambrogio was an Italian single seat glider, designed and built by a 19-year-old model aircraft enthusiast, that competed in the 1938 national championships. Four more were constructed from his plans.

== Development ==
The Sant' Ambrogio, named after the patron saint of Milan, was designed and built in 1938 by the 19-year-old Gian Luigi Della Torre, whose previous experience was limited to model building. It was a cantilever mid wing monoplane, its wing built with some dihedral around a single spar and having a rectangular plan ending in rounded tips. Ailerons occupied about half the span, which was in all only just over 10 m (32 ft 10 in).

The Sant' Ambrogio had a hexagonal cross section, plywood skinned fuselage. At the nose the two upper panels were curved rather than flat; in elevation the nose was rounded and the fuselage tapered aft. The cockpit was centred over the spar and enclosed by a long, teardrop shaped canopy. All the tail surfaces were only slightly tapered, with straight leading edges and blunt tips. The tailplane was attached to the upper fuselage with three bolts and was far enough forward that the rudder hinge was aft of the elevators. Its fin was much smaller than the rudder in area and the whole vertical tail was about as broad as high, though the rudder extended below the keel protected by a short skid or tail bumper. The main undercarriage was a simple ash skid running from just aft of the nose almost to the trailing edge of the wing, attached to the bottom of the fuselage with rubber shock absorbers.

After flight testing the Sant' Ambrogio in 1938, Adriano Mantelli flew it successfully in the Second Italian National Gliding Competition, held in Asiago that year. Immediately after World War II and until 1948 a Sant' Ambrogio was flown by the Leonardo da Vinci Gliding Club at Pisa.

Four more Sant' Ambrogios were constructed by home builders, using plans provided by Della Tore.

== Specifications ==
Data from Pedrielli (2011) p.207,

General characteristics

- Capacity: One
- Length: 4.65 m (15 ft 3 in)
- Wingspan: 10.26 m (33 ft 8 in)
- Height: 1 m (3 ft 3 in) at canopy
- Wing area: 9.60 m^{2} (103.3 sq ft)
- Aspect ratio: 11
- Airfoil: root: Göttingen 535, mid span: Göttingen 535, tip:NACA 23012
- Empty weight: 90 kg (198 lb)
- Gross weight: 170 kg (375 lb)

Performance

- Maximum speed: 130 km/h (81 mph, 70 kn)
- Stall speed: 54 km/h (34 mph, 29 kn)
- Maximum glide ratio: estimated 20:1
- Rate of sink: 0.85 m/s (167 ft/min) minimum
- Wing loading: 17.70 kg/m^{2} (3.63 lb/sq ft)
