= Detter =

Detter is a surname. Notable people with the surname include:

- Brian Detter (born 1959), American business executive and U.S. Navy official
- Dag Detter (born 1959), Swedish investment advisor, author, and speaker
- Justin Detter (born 1982), American soccer player
