= DSK Duster =

BJ-1 Dynamite/ BJ-1B Duster

General information
- Type: Sailplane
- Manufacturer: Homebuilt
- Designer: Ben Jansson and H. Einar Thor
- Number built: 70+

History
- First flight: August 1966

The BJ-1 Dyna Mite, or California Sailplanes Duster was a sailplane designed by Ben Jansson in the United States in the 1960s for homebuilding.

== Design and development ==
A conventional shoulder-wing design with conventional empennage, no component of the BJ-1 exceeds 18 ft (5.5 m) in length, in order to facilitate building and storage in a domestic garage. Construction throughout was of wood, apart from a few mouldings (like the nosecone) made of fiberglass. The BJ-1 Dyna Mite first flew in 1966.

The rough building sketches from Ben Janssons prototype design from 1963, were refined by Hank Thor and the BJ-1B Duster plans were released in 1971 featuring a lighter weight, extended wingspan and a lower canopy that required the pilot to fly it semi-reclined. By 1977, more than 200 sets of plans had been sold. In total 371 sets of plans were sold and DSK (Duster Sailplane Kits) sold about 169 kits.

== Variants ==
BJ-1 'Dyna Mite'
BJ-1B 'Duster'

== Aircraft on display ==
- US Southwest Soaring Museum - prototype

== Specifications (BJ-1B) ==
General characteristics

- Crew: One pilot
- Length: 20 ft 6 in (6.0 m)
- Wingspan: 42 ft 8 in (13.00 m)
- Wing area: 103 sq ft (9.6 m^{2})
- Aspect ratio: 17.7
- Empty weight: 350 lb (159 kg)
- Gross weight: 580 lb (281 kg)

Performance

- Maximum speed: 128 mph (206 km/h, 111 kn)
- Maximum glide ratio: 29
- Rate of sink: 148 ft/min (0.76 m/s)
