= PZL Bielsko SZD-55 =

SZD-55
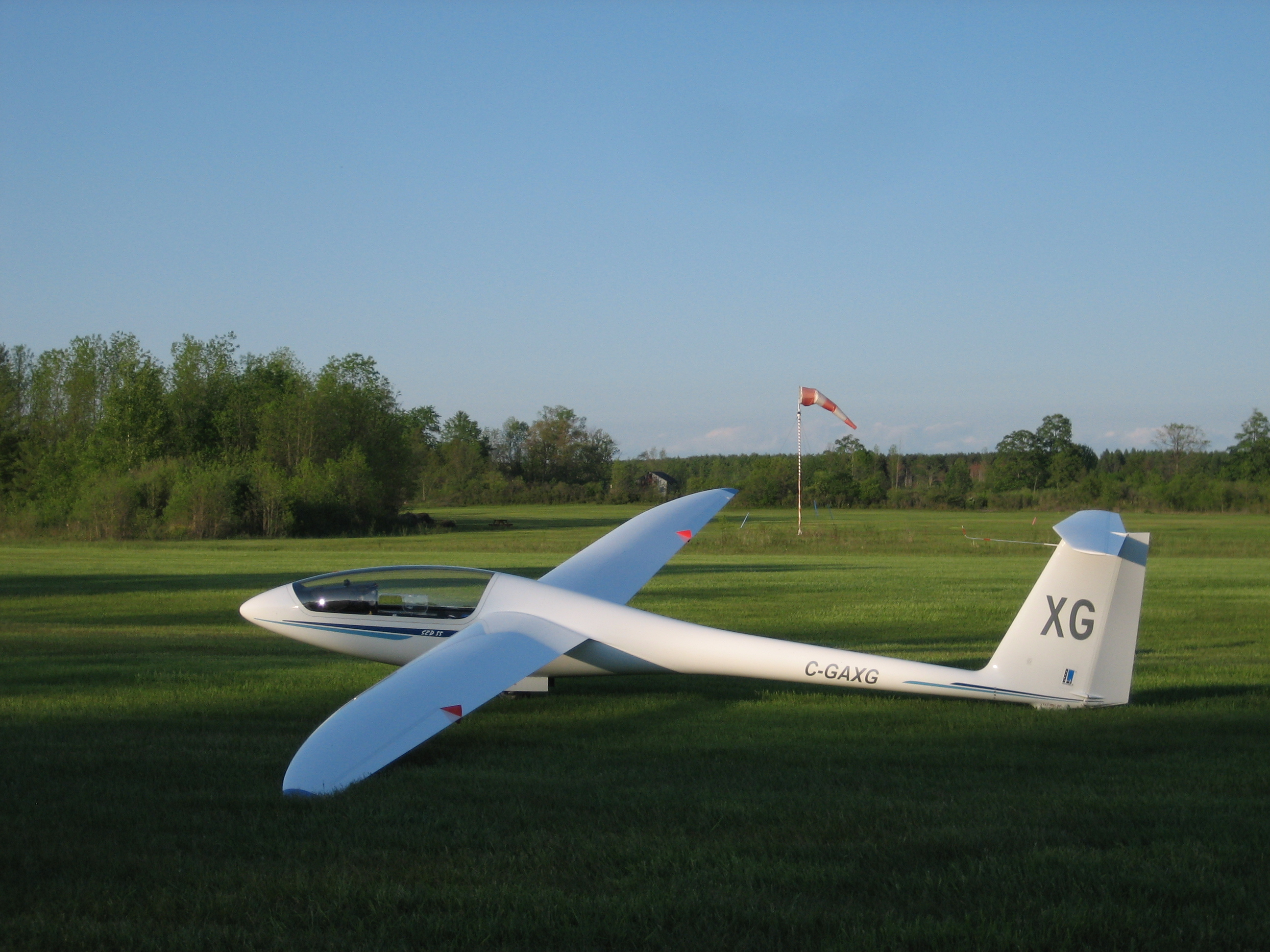
- An SZD-55 at SOSA Gliding Club, Rockton Airport

General information
- Type: Standard-class sailplane
- National origin: Poland
- Manufacturer: PZL Bielsko
- Designer: mgr inż. Tadeusz Łabuć
- Status: in production
- Number built: ~110

History
- Introduction date: 1988
- First flight: 15 August 1988
- Developed from: SZD 48M "Bravo"

The PZL Bielsko SZD-55 Nexus is a Standard Class sailplane produced by PZL Bielsko since 1988. It was built in direct competition with the Schempp-Hirth Discus. The SZD-55 is still in production with approximately 110 built.

== Design and development ==
The SZD-55 is built of fiberglass and has an elliptical wing. It has top surface Schempp-Hirth type airbrakes. The glider is reported to have pleasant handling and to be easy to assemble, with automatic control hookups. With an empty weight of about 215 kg, it is the lightest of the current standard class gliders and it's known for its excellent climbing and thermalling characteristics. The SZD-55 has a cambered wing-section and performs well at lower speeds, yet when full with water ballast (it can take up to 200 liters) it is also suitable for higher cruising speeds.

The main designer of the SZD-55 was Tadeusz Łabuć. Since the mid-eighties, the best glider in the standard class was undoubtedly the German standard Discus, whose excellent performance was attributed to its unusual triple trapeze wing shape. So it was the logical step to adopt a similar idea for use as the outline of the new construction: the elliptical contour of the wing leading edge. In 1987 construction of the two prototypes started, factory numbers X-144 (SP-P501) and X-145 (SP-P502). They first flew on 15.08.1988 and on 03.01.1989 piloted by January Roman.

Despite enormous difficulties in obtaining advanced materials (carbon fabric, kevlar) which meant that the glider had to be built with glass-epoxy laminates (already a relatively old technology at the time) the manufacturer managed to create a glider with an unladen weight of just over 200 kg. This meant that the PZL Bielsko factory constructed a glider that was lighter than the ones constructed using modern materials(carbon fiber and Kevlar), thanks to innovative construction techniques. This technology was further improved during the designing and building of the SZD-56 Diana.

== Specifications ==
Data from SZD Allstar

General characteristics

- Crew: 1
- Length: 6.85 m (22 ft 6 in)
- Wingspan: 15.00 m (49 ft 3 in)
- Height: 1.47 m (4 ft 10 in)
- Wing area: 9.60 m^{2} (103.3 sq ft)
- Aspect ratio: 23.44
- Airfoil: NN-27, modified
- Empty weight: 215 kg (474 lb)
- Max takeoff weight: 500 kg (1,102 lb)

Performance

- Stall speed: 63–84 km/h (39–52 mph, 34–45 kn) at 275-500kg
- Never exceed speed: 255 km/h (158 mph, 138 kn) in smooth air
- g limits: +5.3 -2.65
- Maximum glide ratio: 44
- Best glide speed: 90–119 km/h (49–64 kn; 56–74 mph)
- Rate of sink: 0.48–0.68 m/s (94–134 ft/min) *Minimum sink speed: 75–100 km/h (40–54 kn; 47–62 mph)
- Wing loading: 28.5–52.1 kg/m^{2} (5.8–10.7 lb/sq ft)

== See also ==
Related lists

- List of gliders
