= Berkshire Concept 70 =

Single-seat glider developed 1971

Concept 70

General information
- Type: Glider
- National origin: United States
- Manufacturer: Berkshire Manufacturing Corporation
- Designer: Arthur Zimmermann
- Status: Production ceased 1974
- Number built: 21

History
- Manufactured: 1971-74
- Introduction date: 1971
- First flight: 1971

The Berkshire Concept 70, sometimes called simply the C-70, is an American, single seat, high-wing, 15 metre class competition glider that was designed by Arthur Zimmermann and produced by the Berkshire Manufacturing Corporation of Lake Swannanoa, New Jersey between 1971 and 1974.

== Design and development ==
The Concept 70 was intended to be a domestic US fiberglass sailplane that would compete with the best European 15 metre aircraft being produced in the late 1960s. The company started out as a fiberglass aircraft repair shop founded by Zimmermann and Wolfgang Schaer, but quickly progressed to aircraft design and construction.

The aircraft is made from molded fiberglass, with an internal fuselage steel frame skeleton that connects the monowheel landing gear and the wing fittings to the fuselage, while also providing a protective cockpit cage for improved impact survivability. The prototype has an Eppler airfoil and an all-flying horizontal stabilator. Production aircraft featured a Wortmann airfoil, a more conventional tail, and flaps that deploy to 90° for glidepath control, as the aircraft lacks the speedbrakes or spoilers common to most sailplane designs. The flaps permit very steep approaches, allowing the aircraft to land in small fields with obstacles. The aircraft also has retractable landing gear and was available with optional water ballast tanks with a 200 lb (91 kg) capacity.

Production of the Concept 70 ended with 21 produced, when Zimmermann died in 1974. The aircraft was never type certified and all aircraft were registered as experimental aircraft in the Racing/Exhibition category.

== Operational history ==
In March 2011 there were still 14 Concept 70s registered in the US.

== Aircraft on display ==
- National Soaring Museum storage wing

== Specifications (Concept 70) ==
Data from Soaring

General characteristics

- Crew: one
- Wingspan: 49 ft 3 in (15.0 m)
- Wing area: 132 sq ft (12.3 m^{2})
- Aspect ratio: 18.3
- Airfoil: Wortmann
- Empty weight: 550 lb (249 kg)
- Gross weight: 875 lb (397 kg)

Performance

- Maximum glide ratio: 39:1
- Wing loading: 6.6 lb/sq ft (32 kg/m^{2})

== See also ==
Aircraft of comparable role, configuration, and era

- Schleicher ASW 15
- Glasflügel H-301
