= De Havilland Australia DHA-G2 =

DHA-G2

General information
- Type: Transport glider
- National origin: Australia
- Manufacturer: de Havilland Australia
- Primary user: Royal Australian Air Force
- Number built: 2 DHA-G1; 6 DHA-G2

History
- Introduction date: 1942
- First flight: 1942
- Retired: 1952

The de Havilland Australia DHA-G2 was a Second World War Australian transport glider based on the earlier prototype DHA-G1. Only two prototype G1 and six production G2 gliders were built.

== Design and development ==
The G1 glider was designed to meet a Royal Australian Air Force (RAAF) requirement for a transport glider to specification 5/42. Two prototype gliders, sometimes known as Experimental Glider 1, were ordered from de Havilland Australia (DHA). As DHA were already committed to build Tiger Moth basic trainers and Dragon navigation trainers, most of the work was to be done by subcontractors, with much of the build work on the two prototypes being carried out on the fifth floor of a Mill in Camperdown, Sydney. It was a high-wing cantilever monoplane of all wooden construction, making extensive use of plywood. It used the cockpit canopy of the DH.84 Dragon, but was otherwise an original design. The aircraft's undercarriage used a single mainwheel behind a long nose skid, and a wooden tailskid. The crew consisted of a single pilot with seats for six passengers.

The first prototype made its maiden flight on 14 June 1942, and was accepted by the RAAF on 11 October 1942, with the second prototype following on 17 November. A production order was placed with DHA for a modified version, but with the threat of invasion less likely, as well as the availability of Douglas Dakota transports and Waco Hadrian gliders from the United States, only six were ordered. The G2 was of similar layout to the G1, but had a slightly larger fuselage and a shorter span wing that could be broken into three parts to aid transportation. The first production G2 flew on 20 March 1943 and was delivered to the RAAF on 6 May 1943, with the remaining 5 following in July that year. They saw little use, with most of the gliders being stored, with the first G2 being used for glider conversion training. The surviving gliders were reduced to components in 1952.

The first G2, serial number A57-1, was modified in 1948 by the Government Aircraft Factory for trials of a suction airfoil, the modifications included the fitting of a 96 hp (72 kW) Mercury 59A engine. Trials continued until 1951.

== Operators ==
Australia

- Royal Australian Air Force
  - School of Land and Air Warfare

== Specifications (G2) ==
Data from , Air International July 1976, Jane's all the World's Aircraft 1947

General characteristics

- Crew: 1
- Capacity: 6
- Length: 33 ft 0 in (10.06 m)
- Wingspan: 50 ft 6 in (15.39 m)
- Height: 7 ft (2.1 m)
- Wing area: 332 sq ft (30.8 m^{2})
- Empty weight: 1,450 lb (658 kg)
- Gross weight: 7,165 lb (3,250 kg)

Performance

- Stall speed: 48 mph (77 km/h, 42 kn)
- Never exceed speed: 200 mph (320 km/h, 170 kn) *Aerotow speed: 130 mph (110 kn; 210 km/h)
- Wing loading: 9.7 lb/sq ft (47 kg/m^{2})

== See also ==
- Military gliders
