= Schleicher Condor =

German glider family designed by Heini Dittmar, 1932

Condor
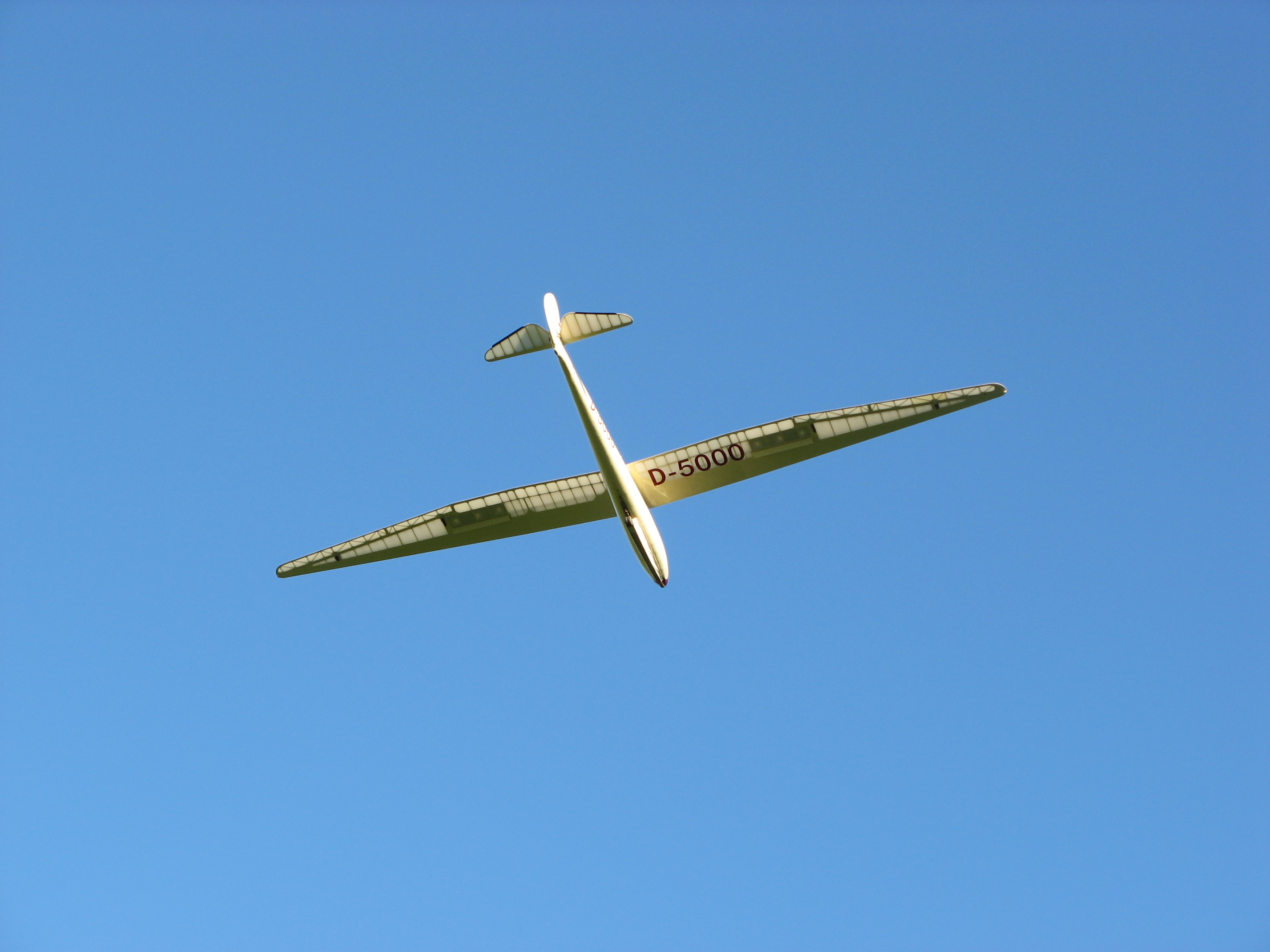
- Condor IV

General information
- Type: Glider
- National origin: Germany
- Manufacturer: Alexander Schleicher GmbH & Co
- Designer: Heini Dittmar
- Status: Production completed
- Number built: unknown, but at least 18

History
- Manufactured: 1932-1955
- Introduction date: 1932

The Schleicher Condor, also referred to as the Dittmar Condor, is a series of German high-wing, single and two-seat, gull winged, gliders that were designed by Heini Dittmar in the 1930s, produced in small quantities before the Second World War, produced again between 1952 and 1955 by Alexander Schleicher GmbH & Co and also by Ferdinand Schmetz.

== Design and development ==
The first Condor I was introduced in 1932. The aircraft was further developed into the Condor II and the IIA, which replaced strut bracing with a cantilever wing. Following the Second World War the two-seat Condor IV first flew in 1951 and was put into series production by Schleicher.

The Condor series was built from wood, with the wooden-framed wing covered in doped aircraft fabric. The Condor IV has a 18.0 m (59.1 ft) span wing that employs a Goettingen 532 airfoil at the wing root, changing to a NACA 0012 section at the wing tip. The wings have balanced DFS-style dive brakes for glidepath control. The horizontal stabilizer is of an all-flying tail design. The landing gear was originally a dolly for take-off, with the aircraft landing on a fixed skid, although at least one was modified to use a fixed monowheel.

Some sources state that there were a total of 18 Condors constructed, while one other says that the total number is unknown, but includes at least 18 Condor IVs built under licence in Argentina.

At least one Condor was converted to a motorglider.

== Operational history ==
The Condor design was a record-setter from its earliest flights in the 1930s. In 1935 one was flown to a new world distance record of 504 km (313 mi). Condor IVs were flown in the 1952 World Gliding Championships held in Madrid, Spain. During that contest Ernst-Günther Haase set a new world record in the multi-place category for speed over a 100 km (62 mi) triangle of 80.9 km/h (50 mph).

Hans Luenger imported one Condor IV-2 to the United States in 1952. After the wooden fuselage was damaged he built a new design replacement from welded steel tube and covered it with doped fabric. The new fuselage included a fixed wheel for landing gear. This aircraft was removed from the US Federal Aviation Administration registry in 2007.

== Variants ==
Condor I
Initial strut-braced, single-seat version introduced in 1932.
Condor II
Improved strut-braced, single-seat version.
Condor IIB
Improved cantilever wing, single-seat version.
Condor IV
Post war two-seat version with a cantilever wing.
Dittmar-Reidel Motor-Condor
Peter Reidel's Condor La Falda was modified to have a strut-mounted power-egg, containing a Kroeber M4 driving a pusher propeller, attached to the centre-section. The intention was for the power-egg to be carried to the glider by the retrieve crew, fitted to the glider and the pilot to fly the glider back to home base without the need to de-rig and transport by trailer. In practice it was found to be impractical due to the complexity of the mounting, as well as time and effort required to mount the power-egg.

== Aircraft on display ==
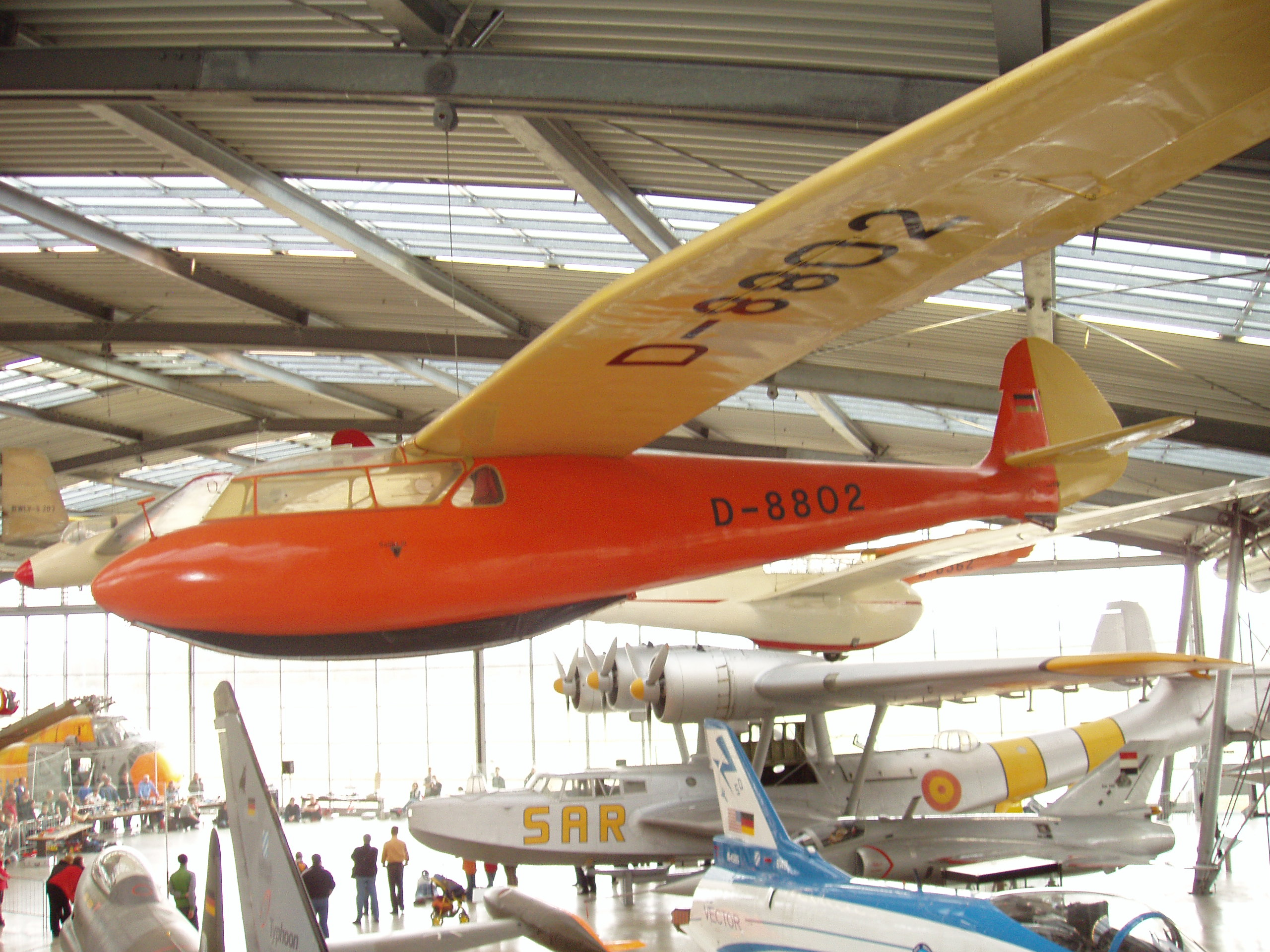
Condor IV in the Deutsches Museum Flugwerft Schleissheim.

- Deutsches Museum Flugwerft Schleissheim

== Specifications (Condor IV-2) ==
Data from Sailplane Directory and Soaring

General characteristics

- Crew: one
- Capacity: one passenger
- Wingspan: 18.0 m (59 ft 1 in)
- Wing area: 21.2 m^{2} (228 sq ft)
- Aspect ratio: 15.2:1
- Airfoil: Root: Goettingen 532, tip: NACA 0012
- Empty weight: 440 kg (970 lb)
- Gross weight: 590 kg (1,300 lb)

Performance

- Maximum glide ratio: 30:1 at 80 km/h (50 mph)
- Rate of sink: 0.70 m/s (138 ft/min) at 69 km/h (43 mph)
- Wing loading: 28 kg/m^{2} (5.7 lb/sq ft)

== See also ==
Related lists

- List of gliders
