= DFS 230F =

General information
- Type: Assault glider
- National origin: Germany
- Manufacturer: Gothaer Waggonfabrik
- Designer: Ing. Hünerjäger
- Number built: 1

History
- First flight: late 1943

The DFS 230F was a military assault glider designed and built in Germany, by Gotha during World War II, to succeed the smaller DFS 230 which it was only related to by name.

== Design and development ==
After initial operations using the DFS 230, it became obvious to the Wehrmacht that a larger more capable assault glider would be desirable. The DFS 230 F was designed to fulfil that need, but in an atmosphere of political intransigence.

The RLM (Reichsluftfahrtministerium - German Air Ministry), issued a directive in 1941 that no effort was to be spent designing a replacement for the rather dated DFS 230 assault glider, in its weight class. Ing. Hünerjäger of Gothaer Waggonfabrik (Gotha) believed that a great improvement on the DFS 230 could be achieved with an aircraft of similar dimensions designing what was named the DFS 230 V7 despite the ban. Gotha named their new design's prototype DFS 230 V7, production aircraft were to be designated DFS 230F-1, to deflect criticism for ignoring the ban on DFS 230 replacement.

Generally similar in layout and construction to the DFS 230A, the DFS 230F was a larger machine capable of carrying almost double the weight of cargo of the base-line DFS 230A-1, as well as seating up to 15 troops, as opposed to seven.

Construction of the DFS 230F was of welded-steel tube for the fuselage with wooden wings, control and tail surfaces, all fabric or plywood skinned. The fuselage was provided with side doors and a removable roof panel to allow loading of bulky items.

Control of the aircraft was by conventional elevator, ailerons, with large landing flaps to reduce landing speed and spoilers to adjust the approach angle. The undercarriage consisted of two main-wheels attached to the fuselage sides and a tail-skid.

Completed in 1943 the DFS 230 V7 had a cargo hold measuring 4.5 m (15 ft) x 1.5 m (5 ft) x 1.5 m (5 ft), a vast improvement on the DFS 230. Access to the hold was via large hatches in the fuselage sides and roof of the rear fuselage. For assault glider missions a crew of two would fly the aircraft with up to 11 Fallschirmjäger or up to 1,750 kg (3,858 lb) of cargo in overload conditions.

Despite successful flight trials no orders for production aircraft were forthcoming and only the prototype was built.

== Variants ==
Data from:'

(Gotha) DFS 230 V7
The prototype of an assault glider in the same class as the DFS 230 (an altogether new design)

(Gotha) DFS 230F-1
The proposed production version

== Specifications (DFS 230 V7) ==
Data from Aircraft of the Third Reich, Fighting gliders of World War II, German gliders in World War II

General characteristics

- Crew: 2
- Capacity: 11 Fallschirmjäger or up to 1,745 kg (3,847 lb) of cargo in overload conditions.
- Length: 12.5 m (41 ft 0 in)
- Wingspan: 19.4 m (63 ft 8 in)
- Height: 2.9 m (9 ft 6 in)
- Wing area: 39.5 m^{2} (425 sq ft)
- Empty weight: 1,253 kg (2,762 lb)
- Gross weight: 2,400 kg (5,291 lb)
- Max takeoff weight: 3,000 kg (6,614 lb)

Performance

- Never exceed speed: 330 km/h (210 mph, 180 kn)
- Maximum towing speed: 300 km/h (186 mph)
- Landing speed: 95 km/h (59 mph)

Armament

- Guns: Up to 3x 7.92 mm (0.312 in) machine-guns

== See also ==
Aircraft of comparable role, configuration, and era

- Waco CG-4 Hadrian
- General Aircraft Hotspur
