= Glaser-Dirks DG-300 =

German single-seat glider, 1983

DG-300
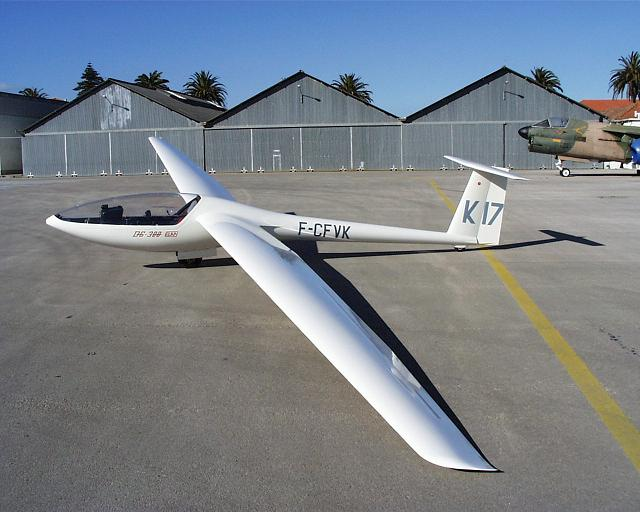
- A DG-300 at Sintra Air Force Base, Portugal

General information
- Type: Club-class (previously Standard-class) sailplane
- National origin: Germany
- Manufacturer: Glaser-Dirks Flugzeugbau GmbH
- Designer: Wilhelm Dirks
- Number built: 511

History
- First flight: 1983

The Glaser-Dirks DG-300 is a Standard Class single-seat high-performance glider built from glass-reinforced plastic. The DG-300 was designed by Wilhelm Dirks and manufactured by Glaser-Dirks Flugzeugbau's Slovenian partner company Elan (company). A total of 511 of all versions were built since production started in 1983. Representative contemporary types from competing manufacturers are the Rolladen-Schneider LS4 and the Schempp-Hirth Discus.

== Design and development ==
The DG-300 has a flapless wing with triple taper based on the Hansjörg Streifeneder Falcon, and employs the HQ 21/II, a relatively thick profile (ca. 17.5%). This wing is 'blown' on the underside by 900 small holes to achieve a controlled transition from laminar to turbulent flow without additional drag. However, these holes are prone to clogging due to dirt, moisture and wing surface polishing, which makes them less effective over time. As with any racing glider, the thickness of the wing makes it relatively sensitive to performance degradation due to contamination by insect impacts or rain drops.

It is agile and a good climber, but slightly underperforms compared to its competitors in cruising flight, especially at higher speeds. The later DG-303 version with a new wing profile and winglets was developed that delivers higher performance at low to medium speeds plus increased aileron response. A fully aerobatic version (the Acro) was also sold, stressed for +7/−5g.

The DG-300 has typical DG features, which improve comfort and safety if at a performance cost. It has the large cockpit typical of DG giving excellent comfort, especially in high-altitude flight where the full-length canopy allows the feet to be warmed by sunlight. The view from the cockpit is superb, adding to the pleasure and safety of flight.

After the bankruptcy of Glaser-Dirks the newly founded DG Flugzeugbau GmbH took over the servicing of these gliders.

The operational limits were reduced in April 2007 after a defect was detected in the main spar which affects an unknown number of gliders. Consequently, the maximum speed and maximum manoeuvring speed was reduced to 135kts and 95kts respectively, maximum takeoff weight was restricted to 450kg, and aerobatic flight was prohibited, even for the Acro variants. These restrictions are removed if both spars are inspected and it is confirmed that the defect is not present. However, if the defect is found, repair is impossible and the restrictions continue to apply.

=== Major features ===
- Wings: spar of GRP rovings, wing shell of GRP / foam sandwich.
- Elevator: GRP shell.
- Rudder: GRP / foam sandwich.
- Fuselage: GRP shell.
- Conventional T-tail with fixed stabiliser and moving elevator.
- Retractable, sprung undercarriage in a sealed gear box.
- Large 5"x5" hub main wheel, 200x50 mm tail wheel.
- Parallelogram control stick.
- Automatic control connections.
- Self-trimming spring system for the elevator, with trigger release on the control stick.
- Schempp-Hirth air brakes on upper wing surface.
- Water ballast bags in the wings for 130 or 190 litres.
- Large canopy with low sill giving excellent in-flight visibility.

== Variants ==
DG-300 Elan
Initial production version.
DG-300 Club Elan
Intended for club use, with fixed undercarriage. Underwing blowholes are replaced with turbulator tape. Retractable undercarriage can be retrofitted.
DG-300 Elan Acro
Strengthened fully-aerobatic variant (restricted from aerobatic flight since 2007).
DG-303 Elan
With an improved aerofoil section and optional winglets; available in standard, club, and acro versions, built by the Slovenian company AMS-Flight until end of 2006.

== Specifications (DG-303 Elan) ==
General characteristics

- Crew: One
- Capacity: 130 kg (287 lb) water ballast
- Length: 6.80 m (22 ft 8 in)
- Wingspan: 15.00 m (49 ft 2 in)
- Height: 1.39 m (4 ft 6 in)
- Wing area: 10.3 m^{2} (110.5 sq ft)
- Aspect ratio: 21.9
- Airfoil: Horst & Quast HQ21/II
- Empty weight: 238 kg (525 lb)
- Gross weight: 500 kg (1,102 lb)

Performance

- Maximum speed: 270 km/h (167 mph, 145 kn)
- Maximum glide ratio: 42
- Rate of sink: 0.59 m/s (115 ft/min)

== See also ==
Aircraft of comparable role, configuration, and era

- Schleicher ASW 19
- Schempp-Hirth Discus
- Rolladen-Schneider LS4

Related lists

- List of gliders

== Sources ==
- DG Flugzeugbau website
- AMS-Flight
- Richard Johnson, A FTE of the DG-300, Soaring, August 1985
- Sailplane Directory
- Main spar defect discussion
- Technical Note 359-24
