= DG Flugzeugbau =

German glider manufacturer, founded 1973

DG Flugzeugbau GmbH is a manufacturer of sailplanes and other composite parts based in Bruchsal near Karlsruhe, Germany.

== History ==
The business was founded in 1973 by Gerhard Glaser and Wilhelm Dirks as Glaser-Dirks Flugzeugbau GmbH.

In 2018 the company received an order to build "a large number" of the Volocopter 2X design under contract to Volocopter.

== Aircraft ==
=== No longer in production ===
The Glaser-Dirks company produced the following gliders:

- DG-100 (Standard Class)
- DG-200 (15 metre Class)
- DG-300 (Standard Class)
- DG-400 (Self-launching motor glider)
- DG-500 (Two seater)
- DG-600 (15 metre and 18 meter Class)
- DG-808C (15 metre and 18 metre)
- LS10 (15 metre and 18 metre Class)

=== Current gliders in production ===
DG Flugzeugbau currently produces:

- DG-1001 (Two seater)
- Rolladen-Schneider LS8c-neo, (Standard Class with optional wing-tips to increase the span to 18 metres.)
