= Glaser-Dirks DG-200 =

German single-seat glider

DG-200
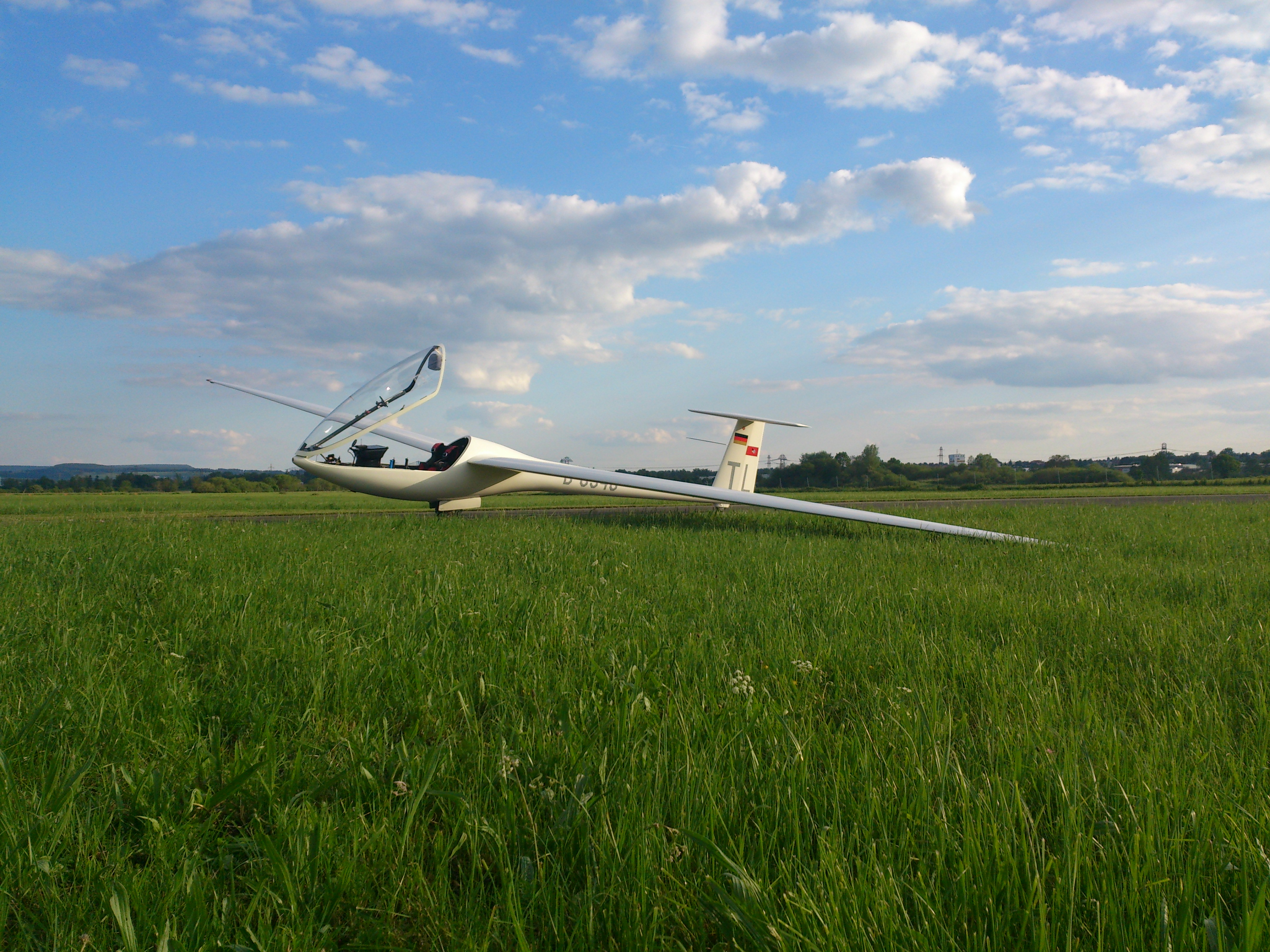

General information
- Type: 15 metre class sailplane
- National origin: Germany
- Manufacturer: Glaser-Dirks
- Number built: 192

History
- First flight: 1977

The Glaser-Dirks DG-200 is a 15 metre class glider built by Glaser-Dirks, now DG Aviation GmbH

Design started in 1976, and it first flew in 1977.

Wingtip extensions to 17 metres were offered in 1978. Later enhancements included a single-piece canopy, a carbon-fibre wing spar and a change in the wing profile. A total of 192 DG-200 were built.

The glider design includes:

- a two-piece conventional elevator, with a fixed forward stabilizer and aft-mounted movable elevator
- a control stick with a parallelogram linkage to reduce pilot-induced oscillations
- Schempp-Hirth airbrakes on top surface only
- a 5"x5" main wheel (drum brake) and a 200x50 tail wheel
- l'Hottelier connection for the ailerons, airbrakes and elevator (elevator connection is automatic on the DG-202). Flaps connection is automatic.

According to Dick Johnson in his Flight Test Evaluation of the DG-200 published in the Soaring Magazine in July 1980:

"The sailplane is a real beauty to behold with its excellent finish and sleek pointed nose. The canopy is exceptionally good, and it provides outstanding forward visibility for the pilot. The cockpit is outstandingly good for moderately sized pilots; I have never flown a sailplane that was more comfortable. I flew several 5 and 6-hour flights in the DG-200 with no discomfort whatsoever."

The DG-400 motor glider was derived from the DG-202/17C.

It belongs to the same generation as the Rolladen-Schneider LS3, Alexander Schleicher ASW 20, Schempp-Hirth Mini-Nimbus, Eiri-Avion PIK-20 and Glasflügel Mosquito.

== Variants ==
DG-200
The original production model
DG-202
Improved model with large one-piece canopy replacing the split type of the DG-200 and other refinements highlighted by customer feedback and flight testing.
DG-200/17
The DG-200 with optional wingtip extensions to 17m span
DG-202/17
The DG-202 with optional wingtip extensions to 17m span
DG-202/17C
The DG-202 with optional wingtip extensions to 17m span and carbon fibre spars

== Specifications (DG-200 15m) ==
Data from Flight manual.

General characteristics

- Crew: One pilot
- Capacity: 130 kg (290 lb) water ballast
- Length: 7.00 m (23 ft 0 in)
- Wingspan: 15.00 m (49 ft 3 in)
- Wing area: 10.0 m^{2} (107.6 sq ft)
- Aspect ratio: 22.5
- Empty weight: 240 kg (529 lb)
- Max takeoff weight: 450 kg (992 lb)

Performance

- Maximum speed: 270 km/h (168 mph, 146 kn)
- Stall speed: 62 km/h (39 mph, 33 kn) at 31 kg/m^{2} wing loading
- g limits: +5,3 -2,65 at manoeuvre speed
- Maximum glide ratio: 42 at 110 km/h
- Rate of sink: 0.55 m/s (116 ft/min) at 72 km/h & 31 kg/m^{2}
- Wing loading: 31–45 kg/m^{2} (6.3–9.2 lb/sq ft)

== See also ==
Related lists

- List of gliders
