= Schempp-Hirth Discus =

German single-seat glider, 1984

Discus
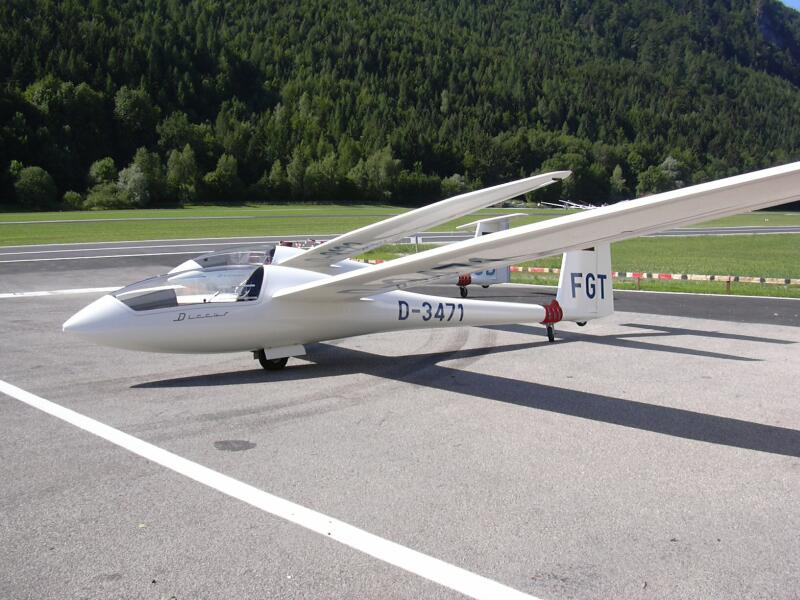

General information
- Type: Standard-class sailplane
- Manufacturer: Schempp-Hirth
- Designer: Klaus Holighaus
- Number built: >850

History
- First flight: 1984

The Schempp-Hirth Discus is a Standard Class glider designed by Schempp-Hirth. It was produced in Germany between 1984 and 1995 but has continued in production in the Czech Republic. It replaced the Standard Cirrus. It was designed by Klaus Holighaus.

== Design and development ==
The Discus was the first production sailplane to have a distinctive swept-back leading edge. This is now common in contemporary sailplanes.

Studies had long shown that the ideal wing for minimizing induced drag should be an elliptic planform. To keep production costs down, a triple-trapezoidal approximation of this shape was adopted for the Discus. The wing section was also new. Winglets were only available towards the end of the production run, though many have been retro-fitted. The fuselage and tail were adapted from the Schempp-Hirth Ventus. A version with a narrow fuselage is called the Discus 'a' and the wider fuselage version is called the 'b'. The fuselage is made of glass-reinforced plastic around a steel tube frame. The wings and tail surfaces are also fiberglass with the exception of the main wing spar, which is made of carbon fiber. There is a 6.5 L (1.7 US gal; 1.4 imp gal) water ballast tank in the fin for trimming purposes when the main wing mounted ballast tanks are in use (184 L combined) for a maximum wing-loading of 50 kg/m^{2} (10 lb/sq ft)

=== Competition use ===
The Discus dominated standard class sailplane racing throughout the 1980s, winning six World Gliding Championships in a row from 1985 to 1995.

=== Performance ===
The best measured glide ratio is 42.5:1. Though it is considered a high performance sailplane, its handling is well within the capabilities of inexperienced pilots. With no bad manners, powerful airbrakes and a low landing speed, the Discus is popular with clubs. Discuses are easy gliders to assemble, having light wings, automatic control hookups and a single pin securing the wings.

=== Production ===
Over 850 Discuses had been built by 2004 and it remains in production today despite the introduction of its successor, the Schempp-Hirth Discus-2. About 12 per year are built under license by Schempp-Hirth Vyroba in the Czech Republic as the Discus CS. Some models are fitted with small sustaining engines (turbos) and are designated Discus T.

== Variants ==
Discus a
Short fuselage and narrow cockpit optimized for smaller pilots, utilising the fuselage and tail of the Ventus a.
Discus b
Standard production model utilizing the fuselage and tail of the Ventus b.
Discus bT
Discus b with a retractable sustainer motor
Discus bM
Motor-glider with retractable engine
Discus CS
Continued production in the Czech Republic
Discus K
Aerobatic version first flown on 18 November 1987. This was, due to disappointing performance in aerobatic, later converted back to a standard version.

== Specifications (Discus b) ==
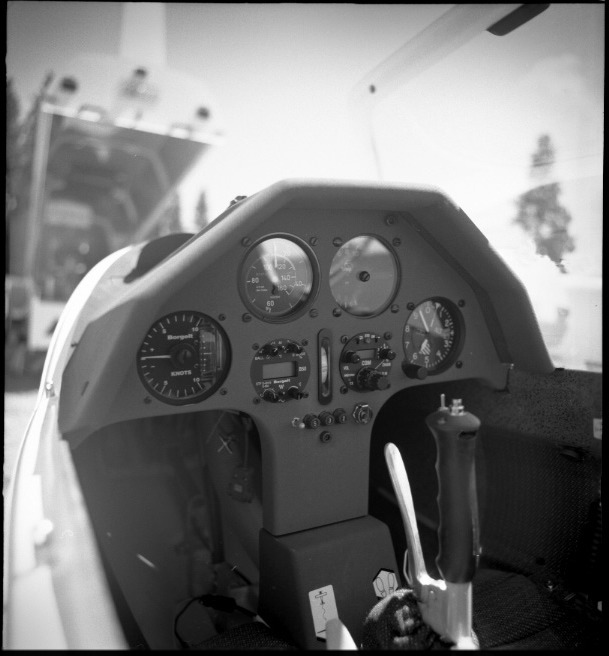
Instrument panel in a Discus CS

Data from Jane's All the World's Aircraft 1988–89

General characteristics

- Crew: 1
- Length: 6.68 m (21 ft 11 in)
- Wingspan: 15 m (49 ft 3 in)
- Height: 1.27 m (4 ft 2 in)
- Wing area: 10.58 m^{2} (113.9 sq ft)
- Aspect ratio: 21.3
- Empty weight: 233 kg (514 lb)
- Max takeoff weight: 525 kg (1,157 lb)
- Water ballast: 180 L (48 US gal; 40 imp gal)

Performance

- Stall speed: 66 km/h (41 mph, 36 kn)
- Never exceed speed: 250 km/h (160 mph, 130 kn) in smooth air

200 km/h (110 kn; 120 mph) in rough air
180 km/h (97 kn; 110 mph) on aero-tow
150 km/h (81 kn; 93 mph) on winch launch

- g limits: +5.3, −2.65
- Maximum glide ratio: 45:1 at 100 km/h (54 kn; 62 mph)
- Rate of sink: 0.59 m/s (116 ft/min) at 78 km/h (42 kn; 48 mph)
- Wing loading: 49.62 kg/m^{2} (10.16 lb/sq ft)

== See also ==
Aircraft of comparable role, configuration, and era

- Glaser-Dirks DG-300
- PZL Bielsko SZD-55
- Rolladen-Schneider LS4
- Schleicher ASW 24

Related lists

- List of gliders
