= Glaser-Dirks DG-400 =

German single-seat motor glider

DG-400
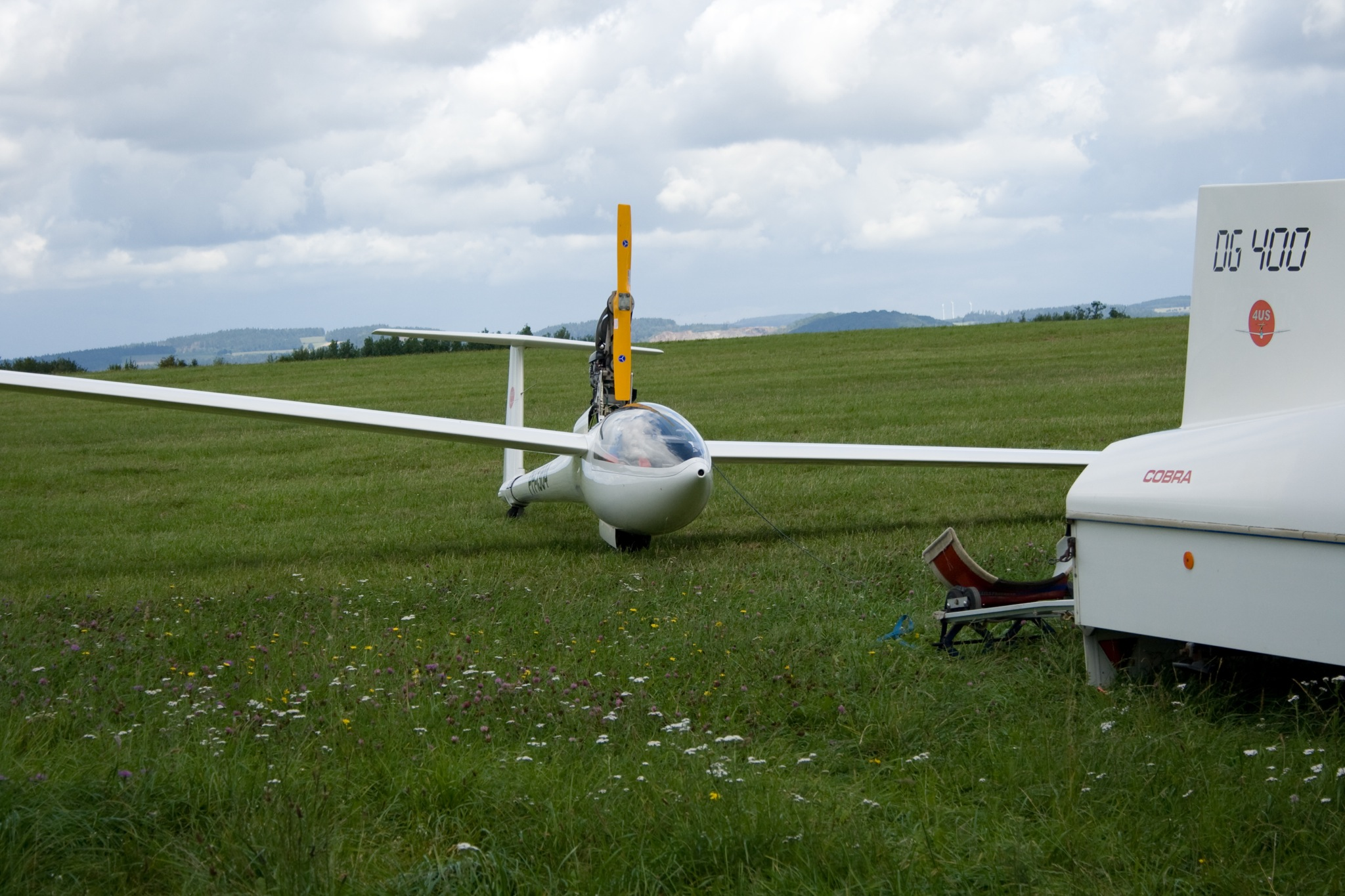

General information
- Type: 18 metre class sailplane
- National origin: Germany
- Manufacturer: Glaser-Dirks
- Designer: Wilhelm Dirks
- Number built: 290

History
- Introduction date: 1981
- First flight: May 1981
- Developed from: Glaser-Dirks DG-200

The Glaser-Dirks DG-400 is a single-seat self-launching motorglider that was produced by Glaser-Dirks between 1981 and 1992. It was the first self-launching motorglider with retractable engine and propeller to be produced in large numbers.

== Development ==
The cost of carbon-fibre had fallen enough in the late 1970s to allow its use in the wing spars of high-performance gliders. Glaser-Dirks introduced a carbon wing variant of the DG-200 about this time. Designer Wilhelm Dirks realised that the span, strength and very low weight of this wing allowed for a self-launching engine to be carried in the glider without an unacceptable penalty when soaring in weak conditions. The DG-400 was created as a result. It first flew in May 1981.

The DG-400 uses the wings and most systems of the DG-202. It has a modified fuselage with a slightly enlarged tailcone and carbon fibre reinforcements to accommodate the engine, which is a relatively large unit with electric starter and electric retraction. This powerful installation, with a user-friendly engine control unit, made the DG-400 easier to operate than other self-launching gliders.

As was typical for the time, the engine, propeller and supporting pylon constitute a single unit that extends into the airflow (in more recent self-launchers the engine usually stays inside the fuselage). The type may be flown either with 15 metre or 17 metre wingtips.

The DG-400 was not aimed at competitions, but rather at leisure flying. Nevertheless, several World Gliding Records have been achieved flying this type.

== Specifications (17 metre wings) ==
Data from

General characteristics

- Crew: 1
- Length: 7 m (23 ft 0 in)
- Wingspan: 17 m (55 ft 9 in)
- Height: 1.4 m (4 ft 7 in)
- Wing area: 10.57 m^{2} (113.8 sq ft)
- Aspect ratio: 27.3
- Airfoil: root:Wortmann FX-67-K-170-17; tip Wortmann FX-60-K-126
- Empty weight: 305 kg (672 lb)
- Max takeoff weight: 460 kg (1,014 lb)
- Fuel capacity: 20 L (5.3 US gal; 4.4 imp gal)

50 L (13 US gal; 11 imp gal) with optional tanks in lieu of water ballast

- Water ballast: 90 L (24 US gal; 20 imp gal)
- Powerplant: 1 × Rotax 505 two-stroke retractable pylon mounted air-cooled piston engine, 32 kW (43 hp)
- Propellers: 2-bladed Hoffman fixed pitch propeller, 1.29 m (4 ft 3 in) diameter

Performance

- Cruise speed: 130 km/h (81 mph, 70 kn) economical

140 km/h (87 mph; 76 kn) max

- Stall speed: 63 km/h (39 mph, 34 kn)
- Never exceed speed: 270 km/h (170 mph, 150 kn) in smooth air

190 km/h (120 mph; 100 kn) in rough air
190 km/h (120 mph; 100 kn) on aero-tow
130 km/h (81 mph; 70 kn) on winch launch

- Range: 400 km (250 mi, 220 nmi) level flight

750 km (470 mi; 400 nmi) cruise/soar

- Service ceiling: 5,000 m (16,000 ft)
- g limits: +6 -4
- Maximum glide ratio: 45 at 110 km/h (68 mph; 59 kn)
- Rate of climb: 3.90 m/s (768 ft/min) at 80 km/h (50 mph; 43 kn)
- Rate of sink: 0.5 m/s (98 ft/min)
- Wing loading: 43.5 kg/m^{2} (8.9 lb/sq ft)
- Power/mass: 0.0714 kW/kg (0.0433 hp/lb)
