= Gerhard Waibel (engineer) =

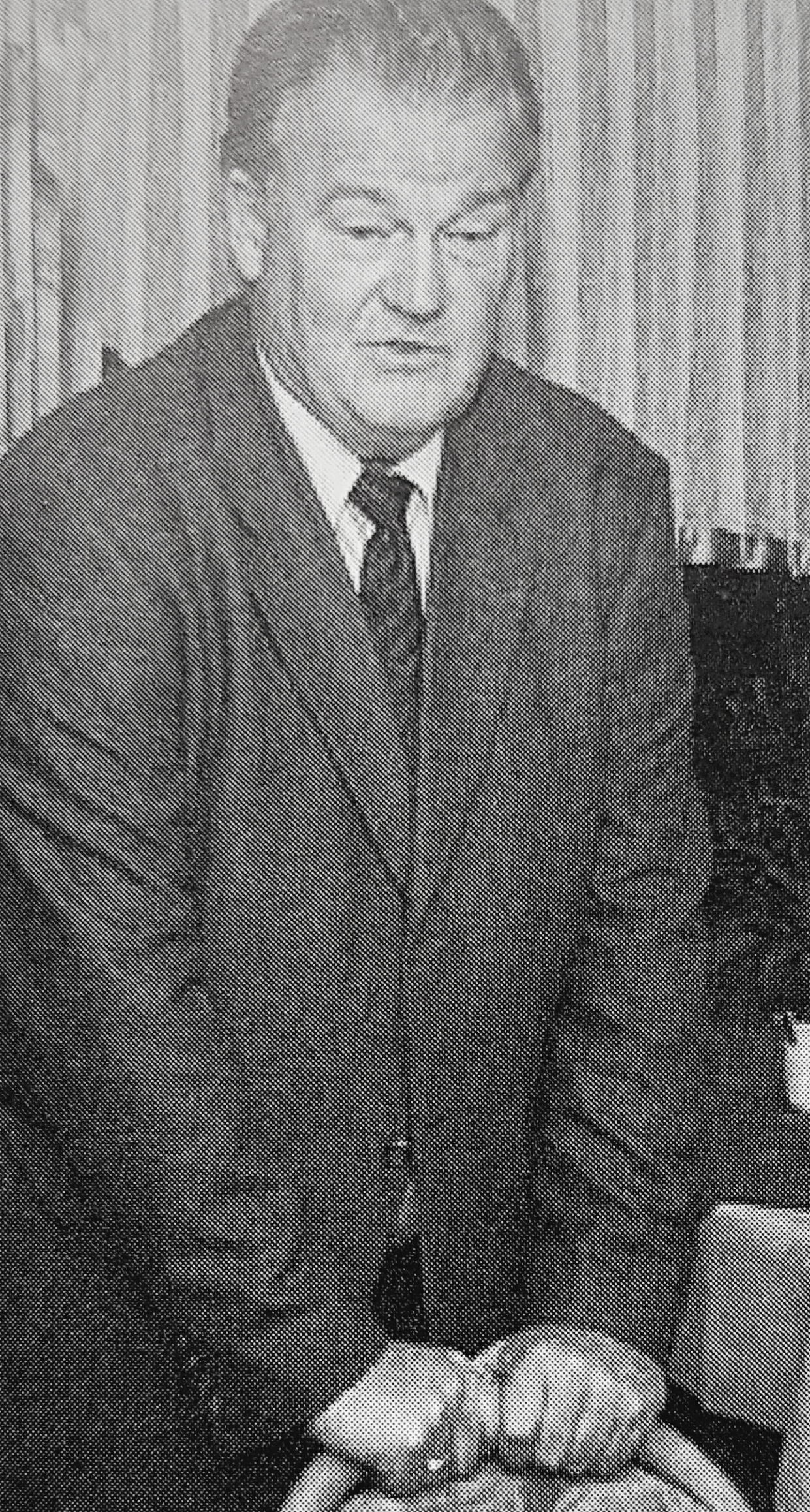
Gerhard Waibel (engineer)

Gerhard Waibel (born 3 October 1938) is a designer of gliders who worked for Alexander Schleicher GmbH & Co producing many famous designs.

== Biography ==
Waibel was born in Frankfurt. His father Karl Waibel had worked with Wolf Hirth in the 1920s. Gerhard began flying models in 1948. In 1951 he helped with building the SG38. He then studied at Akaflieg Darmstadt. In 1962 Gerhard's father arranged a practical course in a steel plant in Sheffield for him and Wolf Lemke. In the evenings they started designing the D-36 Circe. After much development back in Germany, Waibel flew the D-36 to victory in the Open Class of the German Championships in 1964.

Waibel joined Schleicher in 1964. His first design, the ASW 12, was based on the D36. He then designed almost all the racing gliders for Schleichers up to the ASW 28 which first flew in May 2000. The 'W' in a Schleicher designation shows that it was designed by Waibel. He retired in August 2003 after 39 years service.
