= Akaflieg Köln LS11 =

Two-seat German glider, 2005

LS11 or AFK1
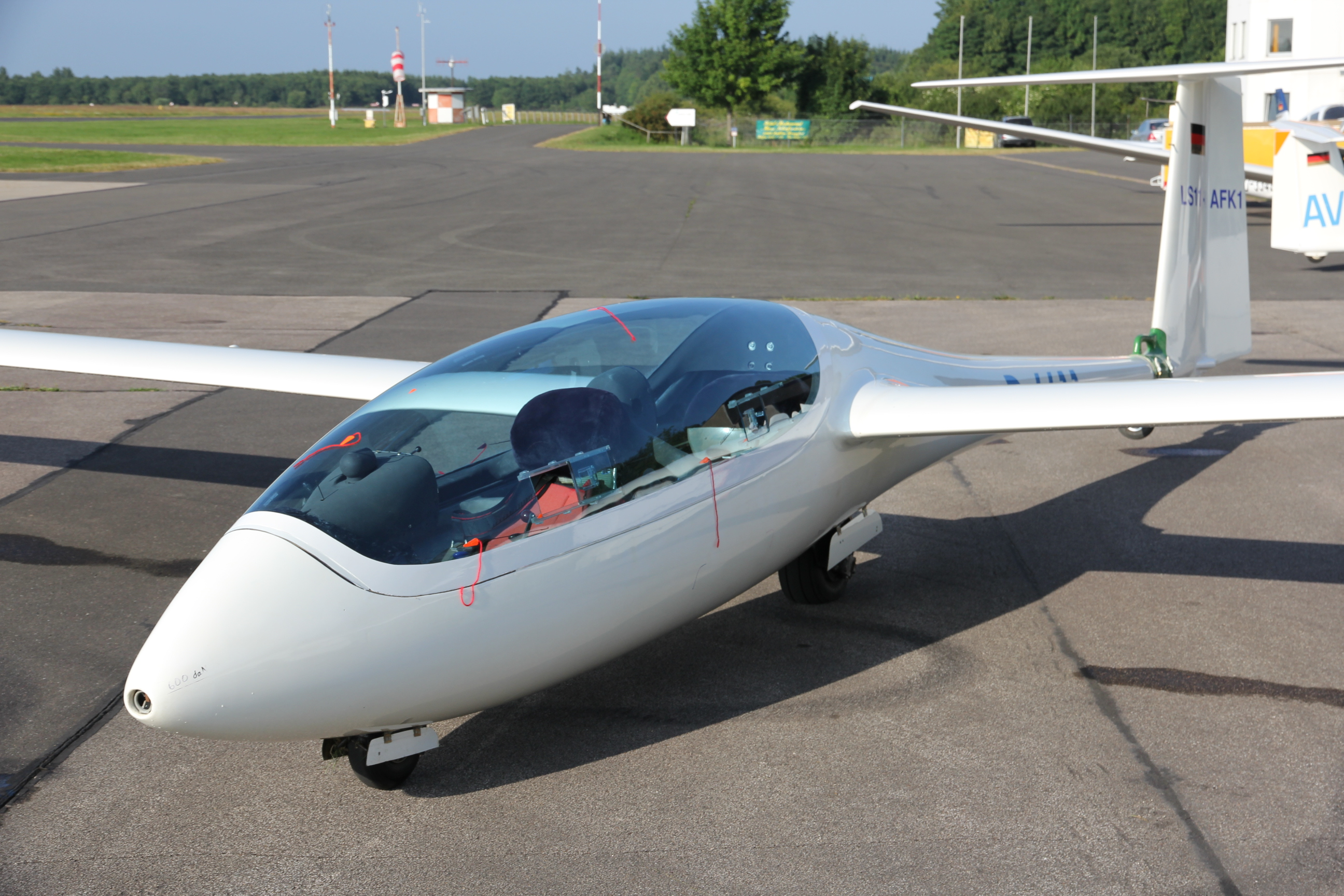
- Akaflieg Köln LS11

General information
- Type: Two-seater- and Open-class sailplane
- National origin: Germany
- Manufacturer: Akaflieg Köln
- Status: in development

History
- First flight: 5 November 2005

The LS11 or AFK1 is a prototype Two-Seater Class sailplane currently in development at Akaflieg Köln e.V. (Academic Flying Group of the University of Cologne). The LS11 first flew on 5 November 2005.

== Design and development ==
Akaflieg Köln initiated in 2000 the concept design for the AFK1. One of the design goals was to use as many standard LS components as possible in order to lower the development costs. This and the large contribution of Wolf Lemke, who performed the aerodynamic and structural calculations, led to Rolladen-Schneider bestowing the type designation LS11 upon the Akafliegers' project.

The goal of the project is to design and build a thoroughly capable school glider with top performance for cross-country training, record flying and competition.

The LS11 gets its performance from an extended Rolladen-Schneider LS6 wing. After the Akaflieg Darmstadt D-41 demonstrated the feasibility of a high performance, multiplace glider based on the LS6 wing, the Köln Akafliegers felt they could profit from and improve upon that design.

The wing structure was redesigned and resembles somewhat the Rolladen-Schneider LS9 structure. The wings, almost entirely made of Carbon fibre Reinforced Plastic, were manufactured at the Rolladen-Schneider factory in Egelsbach in mid-2001, while the span extensions were built in the moulds developed by the Darmstadt group for the D41.

The LS11 prototype was featured as a work in progress at the 2003 and 2005 AERO Friedrichshafen exhibitions in Germany. The maiden flight was to be followed by a comprehensive flight test programme in 2006, to be carried out at Akaflieg Köln's home airfield, Dahlemer Binz in the Eifel region of Germany.

The LS11 is slated for production by the Slovenian aircraft manufacturer AMS-Flight.

=== General description ===
The LS11 is expected to have up to four interchangeable sets of wingtips for spans between 18 and 21 meters. The prototype currently has a 20-meter span in keeping with the new Two-Seater competition class.

Water ballast bags inside the wings enable loadings up to 50 kg/m^{2}. Two ballast tanks integrated into the rudder fin will keep the centre of gravity within its optimum range, compensating for ballast changes and heavier pilots.

The empty weight was a serious design concern for reasons beyond mere ease of ground handling. As the scope for increasing the wing area was limited, since it originated on a single-seat design, the Akafliegers strove to achieve an empty mass as low as possible, in order to keep the wing loading of the shorter 18 meter span within reasonable limits.

Some parts of the fuselage were adapted from existing production types, such as the tail boom of the LS4 and the empennage of the LS8. Considerable redesign was required, however. The span of the horizontal stabiliser was increased; the vertical stabiliser was made both taller and longer, to provide the required steering power while keeping the top of the vertical fin at a height comfortable for the assembly of the horizontal empennage.

The cockpit, manufactured from carbon and aramid reinforced plastic, was designed to accommodate pilots up to two meters tall. Available space is sumptuous for both pilots, exceeding that of all comparable production gliders. The front seat is similar to the LS4 cockpit, and both seats have enough leg and elbow room to preclude the mutual interference too often encountered in tandem sailplanes. The maximum cockpit load is 230 kg.

The large canopy is a single unit which integrates the instrument panels into the canopy frame. It is hinged at the back in the Piontkowski fashion and opens with an upward and rearward movement. The practicality of this concept for large glider canopies has already been tested by Akaflieg Köln through the modification of three Scheibe SF-34 gliders.

The hinge is a carbon reinforced element able to withstand wind speeds up to 75 km/h when open and was designed to sever the tubing and wiring looms from the instrument panels upon emergency release in flight.

The airplane stands on a sprung, retractable main undercarriage with a six-inch hub, and a nose wheel which is likewise sprung and retracts simultaneously with the main wheel. A fixed tail wheel is also provided. This undercarriage scheme simplifies ground handling, since fuselage dollies are not required. The main wheel is located near the glider's empty centre of gravity.

All controls connect automatically upon assembly in the habitual LS way. The control system is built mostly from standard LS parts. The wings are connected by two main pins inserted into the tongue-and-fork spar ends, as in the LS6 and subsequent LS types.

A low landing speed is essential for a trainer. Wolf Lemke and Siegfried Piontowski decided to depart from the typical LS system in which ailerons and flaps act as flaperons, using a mixed schedule as featured in the Schleicher ASW 27. In landing configuration the flaps assume a deflection of about 75 degrees while the ailerons remain in a neutral position, enabling slower landing speeds with good control response. Multiblade airbrakes extend from the upper surfaces of the wings to give ample glidepath modulation.

== Specifications (with 18 metre span) ==
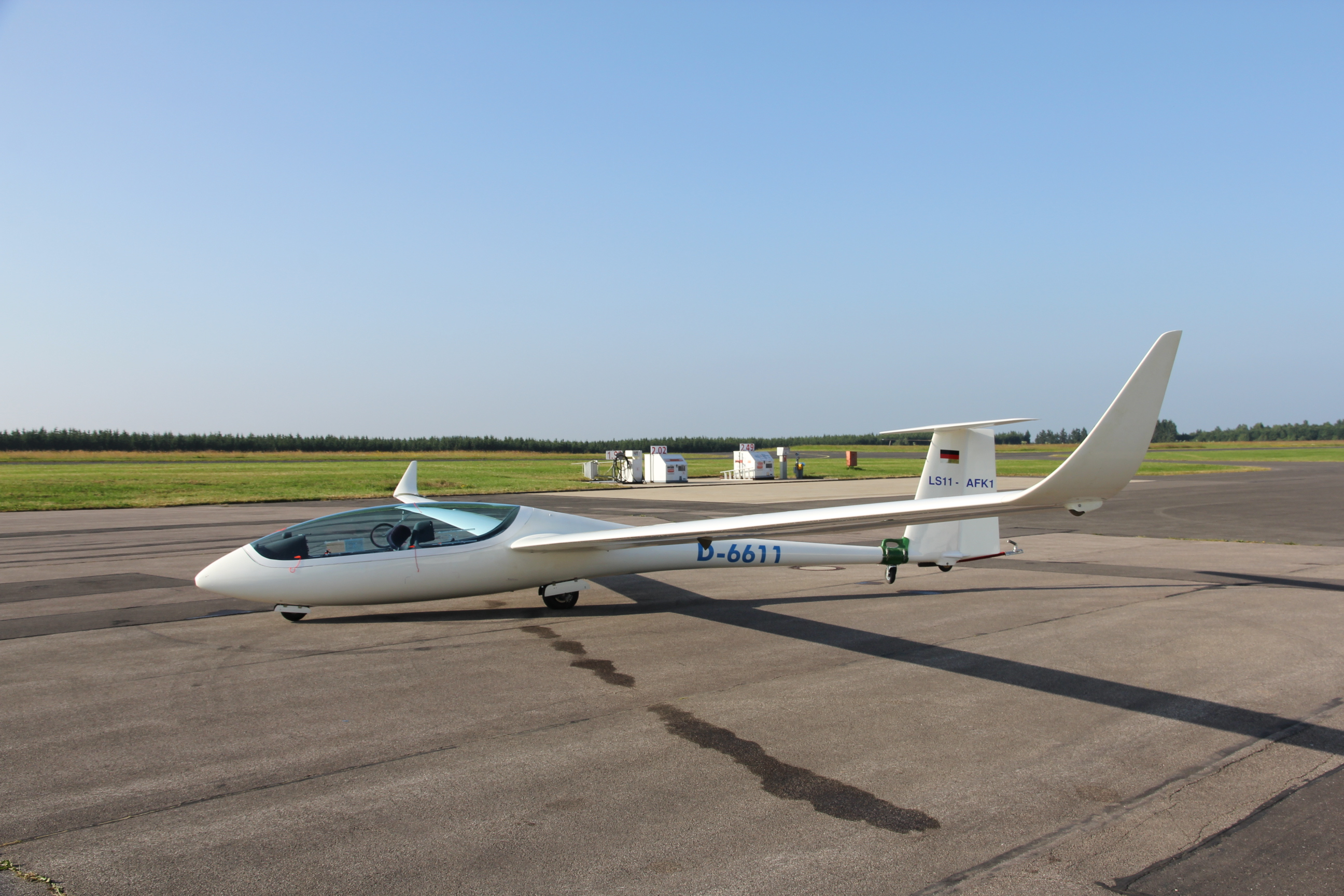

General characteristics

- Crew: 1 pilot
- Capacity: 1 passenger; water ballast
- Wingspan: 18.00 m (59 ft 1 in)
- Wing area: 13.4 m^{2} (144 sq ft)
- Aspect ratio: 24.2
- Empty weight: 360 kg (790 lb)
- Gross weight: 670 kg (1,470 lb)

Performance

- Maximum glide ratio: 46 at 100 km/h (62 mph)
- Rate of sink: 0.63 m/s (124 ft/min)

== See also ==
- List of gliders
