= Rolladen-Schneider LS6 =

15-/18 metre single-seat German glider, 1980

LS6-A
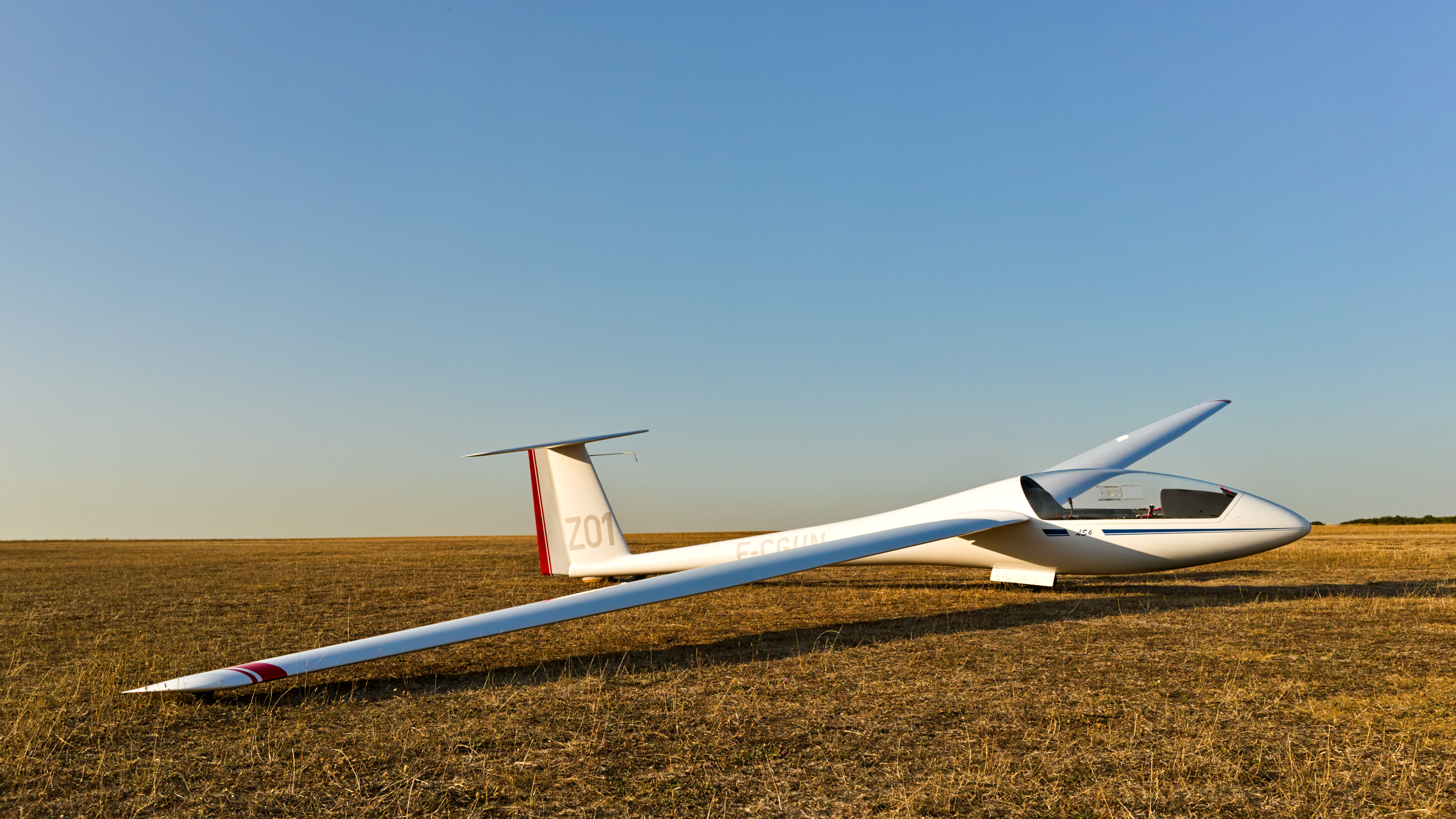
- LS6A of AAVE at Buno-Bonnevaux (FR) airfield

General information
- Type: 15 metre class and 18 metre class sailplane
- National origin: Germany
- Manufacturer: Rolladen-Schneider
- Designer: Wolf Lemke
- Number built: 375

History
- First flight: 1983

The Rolladen-Schneider LS6 is a 15 metre and 18 metre single-seat flapped glider manufactured by Rolladen-Schneider Flugzeugbau GmbH between 1984 and 2003.

== Development ==
The prototype of the LS6, successor to the LS3 in the FAI 15 metre Class, made its first flight in 1983. Having entered production one year later, the LS6 had an uncommonly long production run ended by Rolladen-Schneider's entry into receivership in 2003. A total of 375 of all versions were built.

A watershed design, the LS6 introduced carbon reinforced plastic as a structural material in LS-gliders, thin profiles for wings and empennage, wing extensions and other features that have been retained in all subsequent types developed by the company. The Akaflieg Darmstadt D-41, the LS9 and the Akaflieg Köln LS11 all have wings built in the LS6 moulds.

Bettering the record of the LS4 in the Standard Class, the LS6 dominated the 15 metre Class over nearly a decade, winning the first two places at the 1985 World Gliding Championships at Rieti in Italy, the first three places at the 1987 Worlds at Benalla in Australia, the first four places in the 1991 World Championships at Uvalde in the United States and the first two places in the 1993 World Championships at Borlänge in Sweden.

The type consolidated Rolladen-Schneider's reputation for well rounded, easy to fly gliders that do well in any conditions, being known for its superb handling, tolerance of piloting technique and environment (turbulence, rain, contamination by insects) as well as for good glide ratios over a wide speed range.

The LS6 is succeeded by the LS10, to be produced by DG Flugzeugbau GmbH.

== Design ==
=== Aerodynamics ===
The designer Wolf Lemke decided to retain the wing area of the LS3 but with a double trapezoid wing plan approaching the ideal elliptical shape. A new profile with higher speed potential was selected, the FX 81-K-130 developed in 1981 by University of Stuttgart aerodynamicist Professor Franz Wortmann. Albeit having a thickness-to-chord ratio of only 13%, this conservative profile has a remarkably benign behaviour that pays handsomely in terms of ease of handling and tolerance to environmental conditions. A slightly thicker version of this profile was developed with Prof. Wortmann for the outer wing, assuring healthy stall characteristics without requiring any washout. Profiles of the same family were selected for the slender, wide-span horizontal stabiliser.

A new fuselage, shorter and slimmer than that of the LS3 and LS4, was developed for the LS6. This fuselage and its horizontal stabiliser have been used, with minor modification, for all subsequent LS designs up to the LS10.

=== Construction ===
The slender wings required the use of a carbon reinforced main spar for structural feasibility. The horizontal stabiliser is a spareless carbon sandwich shell. The full-span flaperons are divided into six segments and built as aramid / foam sandwiches allowing a very light and rigid construction. Fairings on the upper wing surface accommodate the tall flaperon bellcranks. The elevator is a carbon / aramid shell except for the LS6-a that employed an Aramid / corrugated paper construction. The fuselage is built as a single shell of glass-reinforced plastic, except in the area of the cockpit that is a double shell for passive safety. A safety cockpit was developed for the -c variant with additional glass, carbon and aramid reinforcements, following crash tests carried out in-house by Wolf Lemke anticipating later TÜV Rheinland crashworthiness recommendations.

The wing-flaperon gaps were originally sealed by internal Teflon S seals on the top side and by thin metal strip seals sliding over Teflon on the bottom side. PET film seals later became standard on both surfaces. The original water ballast system had four interconnected and unvented ballast bags with a total capacity of 140 litres, with a central valve and a single dumping orifice under the fuselage.

== Variants ==
LS6
Initial production version.
LS6-a
with a new construction for the elevator employing an aramid / corrugated paper sandwich, and a modified ballasting system, namely larger water ballast bags and an optional tank in the vertical fin for center of gravity corrections.
LS6-b
(1987) introduced a lighter and stronger construction for the wing shells employing a glass, foam and carbon sandwich. A ballast system with independent valves in each wing was offered as an option. The LS6-b and all subsequent versions reverted to the original carbon / aramid elevator.
LS6-c
major redesign, the most important novelty being the interchangeable wing tips allowing a span extension to 17.5 metres. This longer span required a larger rudder, increasing the overall length by eighteen centimetres. Concurrently, the cockpit was reinforced for increased crash safety and the allowable weight of non-lifting parts was increased. At the same time the control and ballast systems were brought up to a new standard shared with the LS7: fully automatic control hook-ups, a mass-balanced flaperon drive system (previous versions having anti-flutter dampers), airbrake locks relocated in the wings, a trigger-activated trim system in place of the trim wheel, a new ballast system that did away with plumbing inside the fuselage and Mylar seals for all control surfaces.
LS6-c18
reduction in ballast capacity to 100 litres to accommodate the 18 metre wing extensions with winglets and an increase in maximum speed up to 280 km/h.
LS6-18w
further convergence with the LS8: winglets for the 15 metre span and stronger spars allowing an increase in ballast capacity to 140 litres.

== Specifications (LS6) ==
Data from Jane's All the World's Aircraft 1988-89

General characteristics

- Crew: 1
- Length: 6.65 m (21 ft 10 in)
- Wingspan: 15 m (49 ft 3 in)
- Height: 1.3 m (4 ft 3 in)
- Wing area: 10.5 m^{2} (113 sq ft)
- Aspect ratio: 21.4
- Airfoil: modified Wortmann sections
- Empty weight: 250 kg (551 lb)
- Max takeoff weight: 525 kg (1,157 lb)
- Water ballast: 140 L (37 US gal; 31 imp gal)

Performance

- Stall speed: 65 km/h (40 mph, 35 kn)
- Never exceed speed: 270 km/h (170 mph, 150 kn) in smooth air
- Maximum glide ratio: 44 at 97 km/h (52 kn; 60 mph)
- Rate of sink: 0.58 m/s (114 ft/min) at 85 km/h (46 kn; 53 mph)
- Wing loading: 50 kg/m^{2} (10 lb/sq ft)
