= DG Flugzeugbau LS10 =

LS10
- The LS10-a and a DG-808B at Niederöblarn, Austria

General information
- Type: 18-metre class sailplane
- National origin: Germany
- Manufacturer: DG Flugzeugbau
- Status: Production ended
- Number built: 25

History
- First flight: 6 June 2003

The Rolladen-Schneider LS10 is an 18 metre sailplane designed in Germany by Rolladen-Schneider. A prototype flew in 2003.

After Rolladen-Schneider was placed in receivership the sailplane entered production by DG Flugzeugbau. Certification was not achieved until 2010. Other gliders were designed and manufactured by competitors during this period and were produced in greater numbers.

== Design and development ==
By the mid-nineties Rolladen-Schneider, prompted by customers, began designing a successor to the LS6. Development was protracted, as the LS8 and LS9 projects had higher priority and the company's owner, Walter Schneider, felt the LS6 was still competitive.

The initial design was made under the direction of Wolf Lemke. Werner Scholz then developed the prototype, the LS10-a. Although early 3-view drawings of the LS10 showed a curved canopy rail similar to that of the Schleicher ASW 24, when the prototype was revealed it had the same straight canopy rail as the LS6 and LS8.

The first flight took place at Egelsbach on 6 June 2003. This was followed by extensive flight-testing and then evaluation in competitions. The prototype won the Hockenheim and Bayreuth contests in 2004 and the German Nationals in Lüsse in 2005. It took second place in the 2005 European Championships in Nitra, Slovakia. The flying qualities were reported in the German aviation magazine, Aerokurier, to be excellent.

In July 2007, Rick Walters placed first in an LS10 at the International Lilienthal Glide 2007 which is the combined Pre-World for the 30th World Gliding Championships and the 2007 German nationals in the 15M and Open Class, in Lüsse Berlin.

There were two models in production: the ‘turbo’ version called the LS10-st, with the same engine installation as the LS8-st; and the LS10-s with just an engine compartment for retrofitting the engine.

It achieved certification in January 2010, but it is no longer listed as a current product by DG Flugzeugbau.

=== Design of the wing ===
The LS10 differs from the LS6 mainly in its wing; its other features are similar. The aerofoil was derived from the FX 81-K-130 profile used in the LS6, having as improvements: higher performance at the low and high ends of the speed range, and very low sensitivity to turbulence, rain and bugs. The wings have turbulator tape on the underside to prevent laminar separation bubbles. This suggests the profile lacks the clean natural transition of the Wortmann profile of 1981 and is probably more extensively laminar.

The initial design had an elliptical leading edge similar to the SZD-55-1. However the prototype adopted a triple-tapered shape that is easier to build and - most importantly - to repair. The production version had a thicker profile at the wing root, especially modified for the turbulent flow in the vicinity of the fuselage (as with other recent gliders including the LAK-17a, ASW 28, DG-1000, Discus-2 and the eta).

The wing was built in four parts with interchangeable wing tips, giving 15 or 18 metre span. The partition line for the wing extensions was located considerably inboard in the prototype, a feature that first appeared in the Schempp-Hirth Ventus 2c and which allows optimal planform for both spans and easier rigging. For series production DG-Flugzeugbau gave greater priority to structural and manufacturing considerations and the partition was moved outboard to seven metres from the fuselage axis.

=== Other design features ===
- The ballast system has six integral tanks in the wings. The outboard tanks are filled first and dumped last for better spanwise load distribution. The tail ballast system incorporates two separate tanks to maintain a favourable C.G. during water dumping. The control of the first tail tank is connected to the four outer wing tanks, the second tail tank operates with to the two inner wing tanks.
- A taller undercarriage increases ground clearance and gives a higher angle of attack than an LS6, allowing a lower speed for take-off and landing. This increases safety when aerotowing from short runways and when landing out.
- The LS10 has the typical LS full-span flaperons and large, double-blade air brakes, and Hänle-type automatic control connections.

== Specifications (with 18m wings) ==
General characteristics

- Crew: One pilot
- Capacity: 190 kg (418 lb) water ballast
- Length: 6.72 m (22 ft 1 in)
- Wingspan: 18.00 m (59 ft 1 in)
- Height: 1.33 m (4 ft 4 in)
- Wing area: 11.4 m^{2} (123 sq ft)
- Aspect ratio: 28.4
- Empty weight: 305 kg (671 lb)
- Gross weight: 600 kg (1,320 lb)

Performance

- Maximum speed: 280 km/h (175 mph, 152 kn)
- Maximum glide ratio: >50
- Rate of sink: 0.50 m/s (100 ft/min)

== See also ==
Related lists

- List of gliders
