= Rolladen-Schneider LS3 =

15 metre single-seat German glider, 1976

LS3
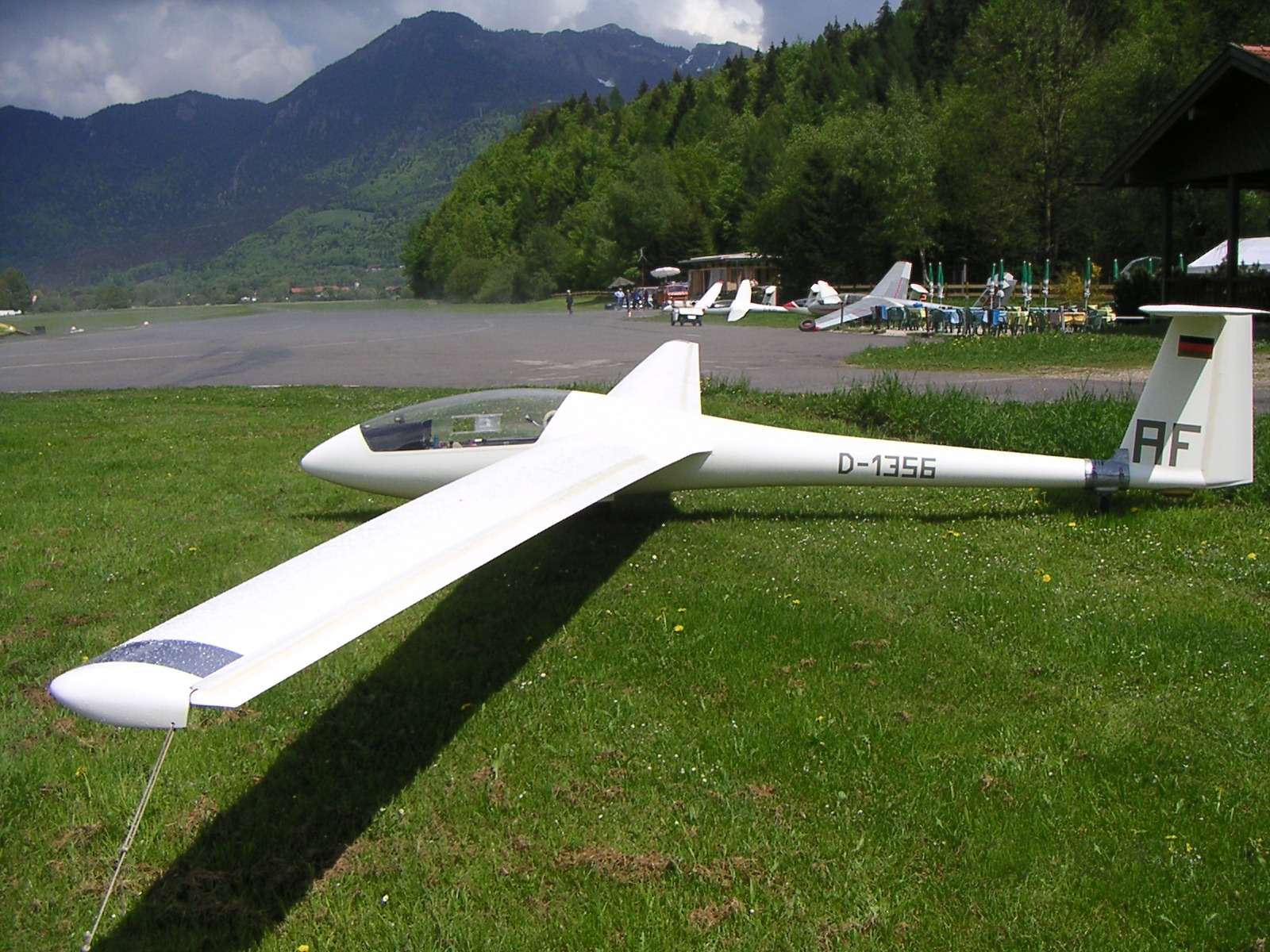

General information
- Type: 15 metre-class sailplane
- National origin: Germany
- Manufacturer: Rolladen-Schneider
- Number built: 429

History
- First flight: 4 February 1976

The Rolladen-Schneider LS3 is a 15 metre single-seat glider produced by Rolladen-Schneider from 1976 to 1983.

== Development and design ==
The LS3 was developed as Rolladen-Schneider's first entry to the new 15-metre competition class created in 1974 by the International Gliding Commission of the Fédération Aéronautique Internationale. Building upon previous experience with the LS1 and LS2, chief designer Wolf Lemke developed a new fuselage with a larger cockpit and more generous horizontal and vertical stabilisers.

Lemke selected a relatively thick airfoil profile developed in 1967 by University of Stuttgart Professor Franz Wortmann, the FX 67-K-170, which offered the structural economy made possible by a tall spar - an important consideration as glass fibre was still the only affordable reinforcement material - as well as good performance for the time.

This profile and its sister profile FX 67-K-150 are among the most prolific in the history of gliding, as they were employed also in the Nimbus-2, Mini-Nimbus, DG-200 and DG-400, PIK-20 and PIK-30, Kestrel, Mosquito, Vega, Jantar and LAK-12 among other types.

Unusually for Rolladen-Schneider, the LS3 wings are single-tapered, entailing a slight aerodynamic loss. On the other hand, this geometry went along well with a straight axis for the full-span flaperons which gave the LS3 good handling and roll rate characteristics. The control system was rigged to reduce the available control stick throw with negative flap settings, therefore giving a measure of in-built protection against overstressing at high speeds. One feature not shared with some competing designs was fully automatic control hookups.

The flaperon drives are located at the wing roots, an elegant solution that required a large amount of lead for mass balancing the control surfaces to preclude any risk of flutter. Due to this the LS3 wings are heavy, about 85 kg each semi-span (thus the nickname LS-Blei, a pun exploiting the phonetic similarity in the German language between 'drei' (three) and 'Blei' (lead)).

In spite of its weight the LS3 is a nimble climber. It is also less sensitive to rain or dirt than other types with the same profile. Its thicker wing takes its toll at higher speeds, where it could not keep up with the contemporary ASW 20, the best 15-metre glider of its generation. One puzzle is how Dick Johnson's flight tests showed essentially identical glide performance for the LS3 and ASW 20 when new, which was not borne out over time. This was attributed to shrinkage over the LS3 spar caps, which resulted in flat spots in the airfoil after a few years. Owners who corrected this flaw (through profiling) found their LS3s once again equal to the best 15-metre gliders of the day, but by then ASW 20 had become almost ubiquitous in contest entry lists.

A variant with separate flaps and ailerons and a slightly taller tail, the LS3a, was introduced in 1978. This version did away with the flaperon mass balancing, making each wing about 10 kg lighter. A span extension to 17-metres was later developed for this version. Although not very successful due to speed and ballasting limitations, these extensions pioneered a trend that has become extremely popular. Today most new standard and 15-metre class gliders offer tip extensions as an option.

The LS3 was superseded in 1983 by the LS6. Its production run reached 429 exemplars of which two-thirds are of the -a version. It remains a popular glider in the second-hand market although it is seldom found in club fleets, possibly due to the added complexity of flaps and undercarriage.

=== General description ===
- Wings, flaperons and horizontal stabiliser: spar and shell of glass fibre reinforced plastic/foam sandwich
- Elevator and fuselage: glass fibre reinforced plastic
- Automatic connections for flaperons, airbrakes, elevator and water ballast valves (except the ailerons in the LS3-a)
- Water ballast system: unvented ballast bags in the wings

== Variants ==
- LS3 - original production version (155 built)
- LS3-a - improved version with separate flaps and ailerons and a slightly taller tail (208 built)
- LS3-17 - version with tip extensions for 17 metre span; no ballast provision (66 built)
- LS3 automatic - prototype with automatic flap system (Wölbklappenautomatik), similar to the Mü 28

== Specifications (LS3-a) ==
General characteristics

- Crew: One pilot
- Capacity: 150 kg (330 lb) water ballast
- Length: 6.86 m (22 ft 6 in)
- Wingspan: 15.00 m (49 ft 3 in)
- Height: 1.32 m (4 ft 4 in)
- Wing area: 10.5 m^{2} (113 sq ft)
- Empty weight: 243 kg (535 lb)
- Gross weight: 472 kg (1,038 lb)

Performance

- Maximum speed: 270 km/h (170 mph, 150 kn)
- Maximum glide ratio: ca. 40.7
- Rate of sink: 0.62 m/s (122 ft/min)

== See also ==
Related lists

- List of gliders
