= Rolladen-Schneider LS1 =

Single seat German glider, 1968

LS1
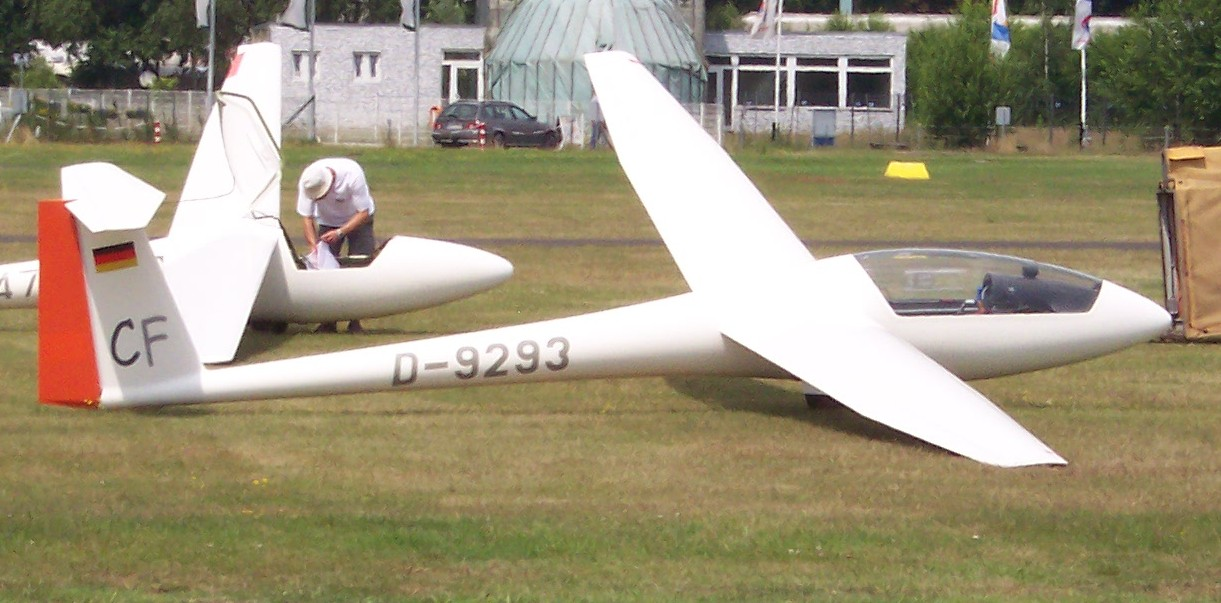
- LS1-f

General information
- Type: Club-class (formerly Standard-class) sailplane
- National origin: Germany
- Manufacturer: Rolladen-Schneider
- Number built: 464

History
- First flight: 1968

The Rolladen-Schneider LS1 is a Standard Class single-seat glider manufactured in Germany by Rolladen-Schneider from 1968 to 1977.

== Development ==
The LS-1 Standard Class design was the first aircraft type arising from the partnership between Wolf Lemke and Walter Schneider, who had already worked together as students on the ground breaking Akaflieg Darmstadt D-36. Here, and in subsequent Lemke-Schneider (LS) designs, Wolf Lemke concentrated on the aerodynamics while Walter Schneider contributed mostly to the structural and production issues.

The LS1 made its debut at the 1968 German National Championships, taking first and second place with the designers themselves at the controls. The success of this design increased in the subsequent years until, in 1975, it was the most flown glider in the German Nationals. The LS1-c took first place in the 1970 World Championships at Marfa, Texas. Jan Rothhardt also won the World Gliding Competition Championships 2015 in the Club Class. Furthermore Christoph Nacke became Junior World Gliding Champion in the Club Class in 2005.

The manufacture of the LS1 was discontinued after the IGC introduced the new unrestricted 15 metre-class in the spring 1977, as the manufacturer needed all its resources to increase production of the LS3.

A total of 464 LS1 were built. Among Rolladen-Schneider’s Standard class gliders it was succeeded by the LS2 (one only) and LS4.

== Design ==
=== Aerodynamics ===
- The designers desired to demonstrate that high performance and pleasant flight characteristics could coexist in a standard class sailplane built with the then still-unexplored GRP technology.
- The performance improvements came from the wing having a high aspect ratio, the double tapered wing; and the new FX 66-S-196 laminar-flow airfoil profile developed by Professor Franz Wortmann. This profile supports laminar flow over a wide range of lift coefficient.
- The natural qualities of the airfoil profile combined with careful wing design yielded gentle low-speed behaviour.
- Variants up to the LS1-d had an all-flying tail with oversensitive handling characteristics at high speeds. A conventional stabiliser and elevator were adopted for later variants. Although fractionally less efficient, this is much safer and more pleasant to fly.
- The front of the original two-piece canopy was blended with the fuselage for improved aerodynamics.

=== Construction ===
- The materials used were glass fibre, Conticell foam, polystyrene, plywood for the spar webs and hardwood in reinforcements. Wood was phased out in the LS1-f version.
- The FX 66-S-196 profile, with a thickness-to-chord ratio of almost 20%, made it possible to build a light and economical spar. This was important because in the late sixties glass fibre was the only affordable reinforcement material - carbon was still too expensive.
- The GRP fuselage shell was produced in female moulds, in an innovative method developed by Wolf Lemke. The LS1 V-1 prototype was the pattern or ‘plug’ for the serial production moulds.
- The undercarriage was initially fixed, as required by the standard class rules of the time. The wheel was sprung and had its own wheel housing, separate from the internal fuselage space. The wheel brake was coupled to the air brake system.
- The new one-piece canopy of the LS1-f required an innovative hinge with complex kinetics to deliver the forward opening movement.

== Variants ==
- LS1-0 V-1 - prototype had an internal load bearing tubular steel scaffold (as in present-day Schempp-Hirth sailplanes). This structure was substituted by full GRP construction in production versions.
- LS1-0 - angle of incidence was increased and improvements to the control system. (23 built of LS1-0. LS1-a, and LS1-b together)
- LS1-a - trailing edge air brakes of the prototype were dropped in favour of conventional Schempp-Hirth air brakes (change incorporated on all further variants) (23 built of LS1-0. LS1-a, and LS1-b together)
- LS1-b - (23 built of LS1-0. LS1-a, and LS1-b together)
- LS1-c - (198 built of LS1-c and LS1-d together)
- LS1-d - was the first to have water ballast, following a class rule change. (198 built of LS1-c and LS1-d together)
- LS1-e - version was built privately by a Rolladen-Schneider employee under the direction of Wolf Lemke. Differs from the LS1-c only in the use of an LS2 type tailplane (2 built)
- LS1-ef - tailplane of the LS1-f and the same fuselage as former versions (1 built)
- LS1-f - introduced the one-piece canopy, conventional tailplane, redesigned rudder and structural changes that allowed more water ballast and higher flight mass. It also has a reduced wing incidence relative to the fuselage, resulting in noticeably better high speed performance than the earlier LS1 variants. (240 built)
- LS1-f(45) - Water ballasts of 2 x 90 liters instead of 2 x 45 liters, increasing the maximal wing loading from 40 to 45 kg/m^{2} (hence the name) (2 built).

== Specifications (LS1-f) ==
Data from

General characteristics

- Crew: 1
- Length: 6.75 m (22 ft 2 in)
- Wingspan: 15 m (49 ft 3 in)
- Height: 1.37 m (4 ft 6 in)
- Wing area: 9.75 m^{2} (104.9 sq ft)
- Aspect ratio: 23.1
- Airfoil: modified Wortmann FX-66-S-196 sections
- Empty weight: 230 kg (507 lb)
- Max takeoff weight: 390 kg (860 lb)
- Water ballast: 90 L (24 US gal; 20 imp gal)

Performance

- Stall speed: 70 km/h (43 mph, 38 kn)
- Never exceed speed: 250 km/h (160 mph, 130 kn) in smooth and rough air

170 km/h (92 kn; 110 mph) maneuvering speed
170 km/h (92 kn; 110 mph) on aero-tow
130 km/h (70 kn; 81 mph) on winch launch

- g limits: +5.3 -2.65 at 170 km/h (92 kn; 110 mph); +4 -1.5 at 250 km/h (130 kn; 160 mph)
- Maximum glide ratio: 38.5 at 100 km/h (54 kn; 62 mph)
- Rate of sink: 0.60 m/s (118 ft/min) at 72 km/h (39 kn; 45 mph)
- Wing loading: 45 kg/m^{2} (9.2 lb/sq ft)
- IGC club class Handicap 100

== See also ==
Aircraft of comparable role, configuration, and era

- Bölkow Phoebus
- Glasflügel Standard Libelle
- Schempp-Hirth Standard Cirrus
- Schleicher ASW 15

Related lists

- List of gliders
