= Rolladen-Schneider LS5 =

Single seat German glider, 1988

LS5
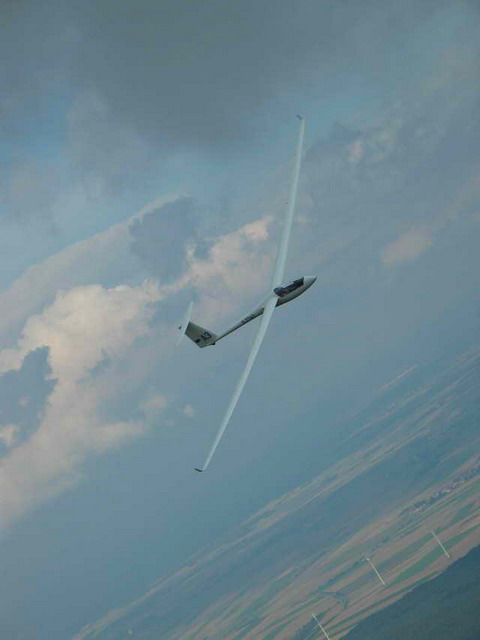
- Rolladen-Schneider LS5

General information
- Type: Open-class sailplane
- National origin: Germany
- Manufacturer: Rolladen-Schneider
- Number built: 1

History
- First flight: 1988

The Rolladen-Schneider LS5 was an Open Class single seat glider aircraft designed by Rolladen-Schneider. Only a single unit was built.

== Design and development ==
The LS5 was announced in 1980 as Rolladen-Schneider’s entry into the exclusive Open Class. The economic viability of the design was compromised, however, with the arrival in 1981 of the Schempp-Hirth Nimbus-3 and the Schleicher ASW 22, both of which outclassed the predicted performance of the yet-to-fly LS5. Although the moulds had already been completed, Rolladen-Schneider decided not to pursue further development. Klaus Mies from Kaiserslautern used these moulds to produce one glider of the type. This homebuilt prototype made its maiden flight in 1988, receiving the registration number D-7742. It is based at Marpingen in Germany.

== Specifications ==
General characteristics

- Crew: One
- Length: 6.96 m (22 ft 10.0 in)
- Wingspan: 22.78 m (74 ft 8.9 in)
- Wing area: 13.9 m^{2} (150 sq ft)
- Aspect ratio: 37.3
- Empty weight: 370 kg (816 lb)
- Gross weight: 696 kg (1,535 lb)

Performance

- Maximum glide ratio: ca. 55
- Rate of sink: 0.40 m/s (79 ft/min)

== See also ==
- List of gliders
