= Rolladen-Schneider LSD Ornith =

LSD Ornith
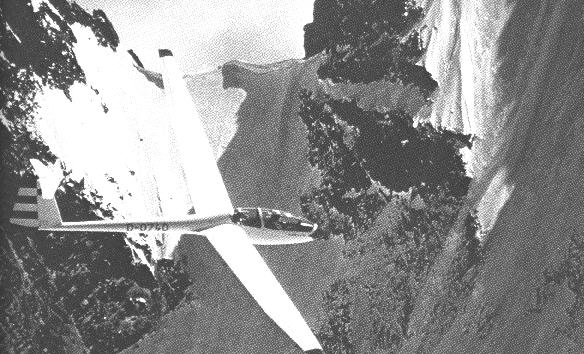

General information
- Type: Two-seater class sailplane
- National origin: Germany
- Manufacturer: Rolladen-Schneider
- Number built: 1

History
- First flight: May 1972

The Rolladen-Schneider LSD Ornith is the first two-seater sailplane to have been built from plastic composites. The single exemplar was designed by Wolf Lemke and Karl Pummer and first flew in May 1972, a few weeks before the Akaflieg Braunschweig SB-10 Schirokko.

== Design and development ==
As far as possible, components from the serially-produced LS1 sailplane were used, including the fuselage forms. This resulted in a cramped cockpit, where the pedals of the rear seat are almost upon the front seat control stick. The two-piece canopy extends back up to the wing spar. The undercarriage comprises fixed wheel and tailskid. The very large rudder is quite striking. The wings were extended at the root by approximately one and a half metres, yielding a span of eighteen metres, with two degrees of negative sweep. Schempp Hirth airbrakes sprout from the wing upper surfaces. Separate actions for the nose-hook and centre of gravity hook are the only control oddity in this pleasant-flying design. The empty weight of only 287 kg is remarkably light for a double-seater.

The Ornith achieved some notable gliding records flying from Switzerland and South Africa. Only one LSD was built and is today in the German Gliding Museum on the Wasserkuppe mountain.

== Specifications ==
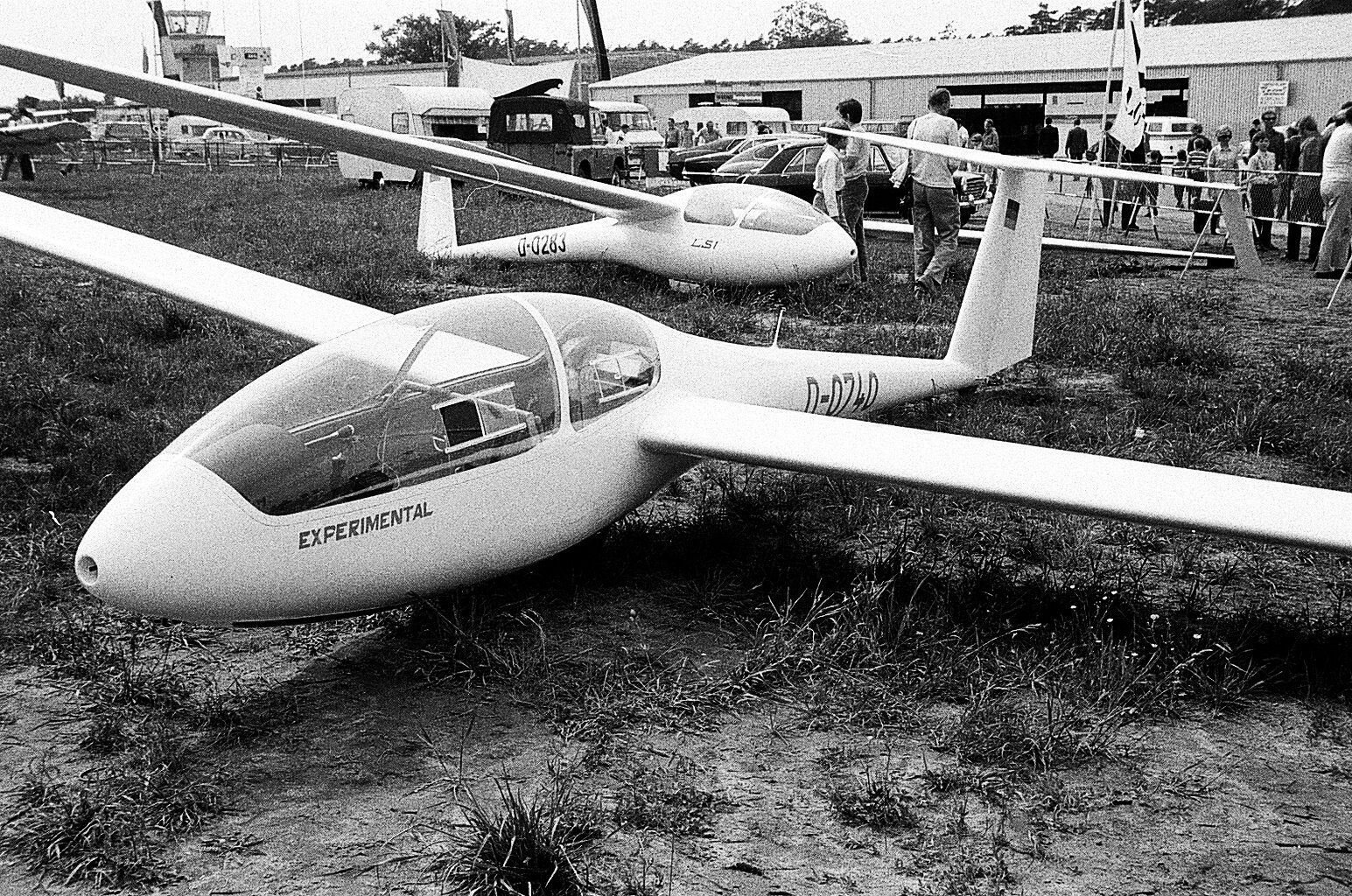
LSD Ornith prototype, 1971

General characteristics

- Crew: Two
- Wingspan: 18.00 m (59 ft 1 in)
- Wing area: 12.4 m^{2} (133 sq ft)
- Aspect ratio: 26.1
- Empty weight: 287 kg (631 lb)
- Gross weight: 450 kg (990 lb)

Performance

- Maximum glide ratio: >40
- Rate of sink: 0.60 m/s (120 ft/min)

== See also ==
Related lists

- List of gliders
