= Akaflieg München Mü28 =

Single-seat German research glider, 1983

Mü28
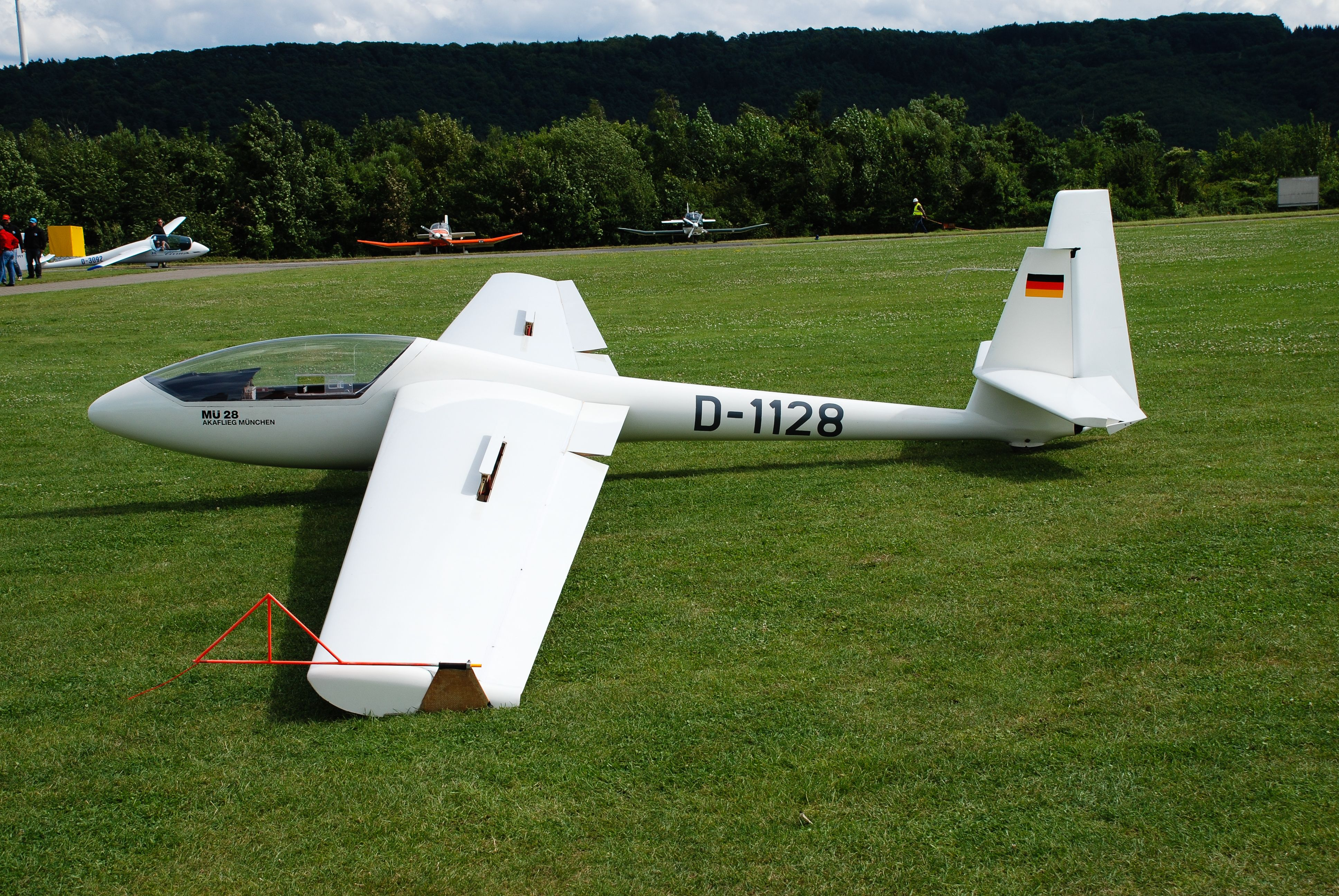
- Akaflieg München Mü 28 at the 2012 German Aerobatic Championships, Koblenz/Winningen

General information
- Type: Research aerobatic glider aircraft
- National origin: Germany
- Manufacturer: Akaflieg München
- Number built: 1

History
- First flight: 8 August 1983

The Akaflieg München Mü28 is a research glider aircraft that was designed and built in Germany in 1983. Only one example of the design was built.

== Development ==
Students at Akaflieg München started the development of a high performance aerobatic glider during the early 1980s. The aerobatic performance of the resulting Mü28 hinged on the extremely strong structure, stressed to +/-10g. Use of a symmetrical aerofoil section and an innovative automatic flap system (Wölbklappenautomatik) contributed to the Mü28's success.

By combining a symmetrical aerofoil section with an automatic flap system the Mü28 has identical performance and handling in normal and inverted flight, resulting in a harmonious image whether flying inverted or in normal flight during aerobatic routines.

== Wölbklappenautomatik (Automatic flap System) ==
This innovative automatic flap system fitted to the Mü28 was developed at the Flugwissenschaftliche Vereinigung Aachen under the project designation FVA-21, controlling the position of the flaps, depending on the speed and the load factor, so that the aircraft flies with optimal angle of attack in all flight conditions.

The essential element of this automatic system is a lever arm attached to a mass in the centre-fuselage, which is connected with the pitch controls. The moment generated by the mass is arranged to reach an equilibrium condition with the pitch control forces at each flight condition, with the flaps moving to a high lift coefficient position at low speeds or when there is a high pitch control load, and vice versa, maintaining the optimum angle of attack for the aerofoil. The automatic system on the Mü28 is identical in operation with the aircraft inverted, due to the use of a symmetrical section aerofoil set at zero degrees incidence, with the automatic system only turned off for takeoff and landing, and over-ridden manually as desired by the pilot.

After successful testing on a scale model the automatic flap system was installed in the Mü28. The automatic flap system's suitability for cross-country flying has also been tested successfully in a specially modified Rolladen-Schneider LS3 high-performance competition glider. A high degree of reliability is achieved due to there being no electrical or electronic components in the automatic flap system. Due to the automatic nature of the system, incorrect flap settings, such as caused by pilots under stress, are a thing of the past.

== Operational history ==
In 1984 the Mü28 participated in its first Glider Aerobatics Championships, and has participated in aerobatic championships throughout Europe since then. At each championship up to nine pilots could be seen on the scoring lists flying Mü28, but each pilot would use the same aircraft as there has only been one Mü28 built so far. This aircraft has nearly 4,000 take-offs and more than 1,000 flying hours under its belt, appearing at numerous national and international competitions, flown by pilots from different countries, in Germany, Hungary, Austria, Switzerland, France, Turkey, Belgium and the Netherlands, with only about 5% of flights in the log book from the Akaflieg München home base at Königsdorf.

The most significant sporting successes of the Mü28 occurred in the 1980s and 1990s, but it is still used for competitions, participating in the 2007 Salzmann Cup, one of the most famous glider aerobatics competitions in Germany. Some notable successes were:

- 1984 Bavarian Glider Aerobatics Championship, Halbacro, Thannhausen 3rd Place
- 1985 German Glider Aerobatics Championship, Vollacro, Hockenheim, 14th Place
- 1986 International Andrzeij Ablamowicz Memorial Cup, Rybnik, Poland 3rd Place
- 1986 Bavarian Glider Aerobatics Championship, Vollacro, Thannhausen 5th Place
- 1987 German Glider Aerobatics Championship, Vollacro, Paderborn 2nd Place
- 1987 World Glider Aerobatics Championship, Bielsko-Biala, Poland, Sept 16th. Placed 3rd in single-seat Freestyle World Cup
- 1990 German Glider Aerobatics Championship, Vollacro, Aue Hattorf
- 1991 Bavarian Glider Aerobatics Championship, parishes 3rd Place
- 1991 World Glider Aerobatics Championship in Zielona Gora, Poland 13th Place

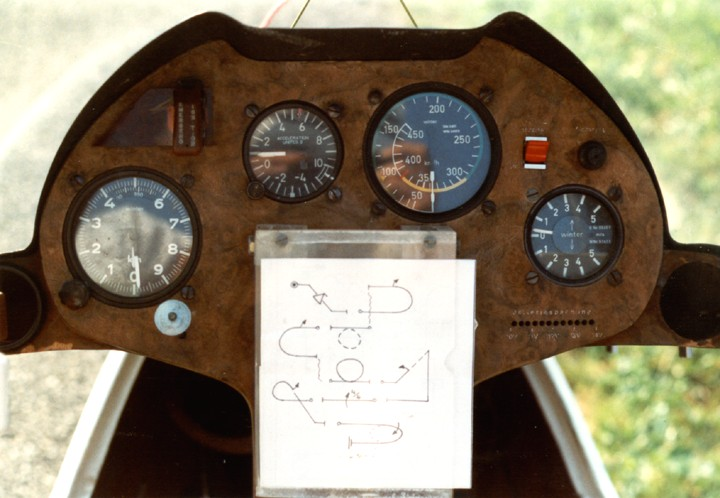
the instrument panel of the Mü28

== Specifications (with 90 kg (200 lb) payload) ==
Data from

General characteristics

- Crew: 1
- Length: 6.75 m (22 ft 2 in)
- Wingspan: 12 m (39 ft 4 in)
- Wing area: 13.2 m^{2} (142 sq ft)
- Airfoil: FX 71-L-150/20
- Empty weight: 315 kg (694 lb)
- Max takeoff weight: 453 kg (999 lb)

Performance

- Stall speed: 67 km/h (42 mph, 36 kn)
- Never exceed speed: 380 km/h (240 mph, 210 kn)
- g limits: +10, -10
- Roll rate: 360° in 4.2 seconds
- Maximum glide ratio: 27 at 103 km/h (56 kn; 64 mph)
- Rate of sink: 1 m/s (200 ft/min) at 89 km/h (48 kn; 55 mph)

Avionics
Flight director + full standard instrument panel
