= Sportinė Aviacija LAK-19 =

Lithuanian sailplane

LAK-19

General information
- Type: Standard-class sailplane
- National origin: Lithuania
- Manufacturer: AB Sportinė Aviacija
- Number built: c.33

History
- First flight: 30 July 2001

The LAK-19 is a Lithuanian single-seat Standard-class sailplane manufactured by Sportinė Aviacija.

== Design and development ==
The LAK-19 is a single-seat standard-class sailplane manufactured in Lithuania by Sportinė Aviacija. It is designed to meet the requirements of the utility category of JAR-22. It is a mid-wing glider with a T-tail and retractable main landing gear. Interchangeable outer wing panels are provided to enable it to fly with a span of either 15 or 18 metres.

The sailplane is of composite construction using materials such as kevlar, carbon and glass fibre. The wing spar is of carbon fibre. The weight of each wing panel is about 55 kg. Schempp-Hirth airbrakes are mounted on the upper surfaces. It is capable of carrying 180 litres (47 gallons) of water ballast. All controls, including the water ballast system, hook up automatically. The one-piece canopy hinges forward.

The LAK-19 was based on the design of the earlier LAK-17, but is not fitted with flaps. It was first flown on 30 July 2001, and was certified on 31 May 2002 by the Lithuanian Civil Aviation Authority.

== Variants ==
LAK-19
Production 15- or 18-metre wingspan sailplane. Both variants can also be fitted with or without winglets.
LAK-19T
Powered self-sustaining sailplane variant of the LAK-19 with a Solo 2350B two-cylinder air-cooled two-stroke retractable engine.

== Specifications (LAK-19 with 15 metre wingspan) ==
Data from

General characteristics

- Crew: 1
- Capacity: 180 kg (397 lb) water ballast
- Length: 6.53 m (21 ft 5 in)
- Wingspan: 15.00 m (49 ft 2 in)
- Height: 1.29 m (4 ft 3 in)
- Wing area: 9.06 m^{2} (97.52 sq ft)
- Aspect ratio: 24.83
- Empty weight: 220 kg (485 lb)
- Gross weight: 453 kg (999 lb)

Performance

- Maximum speed: 275 km/h (171 mph, 149 kn)
- Maximum glide ratio: 45
- Rate of sink: 0.53 m/s (104 ft/min)

== See also ==
Related lists

- List of gliders
