= LS2 =

LS2 may refer to:

- The GM LS engine
- The Rolladen-Schneider LS2 glider
- Postcode area for the northern part of Central Leeds
- Life Sciences Switzerland, a federation of scientific societies
- A line-switch pedal made by Boss Corporation
- A brand of motorcycle helmets
