= Rolladen-Schneider Flugzeugbau =

German manufacturer of glider aircraft, 1967–2003

Rolladen-Schneider was a major glider manufacturer. The company originally made rolling doors and shutters and was run by Willi and Walter Schneider based in Egelsbach near Frankfurt, Germany. Walter was a keen glider pilot and recruited a sailplane designer Wolf Lemke. The company built its first glider in 1967.

The company produced the following gliders:

- LS1 (Standard Class)
- LSD Ornith (two seater prototype)
- LS2 (15 metre Class, though before the present classes existed)
- LS3 (15 metre Class)
- LS4 (Standard Class)
- LS5 (23 metre prototype only)
- LS6 (15 metre Class with optional tips to give 17.5 metres or 18 metre spans)
- LS7 (Standard Class)
- LS8 (Standard Class with optional tips to give 18 metre span)
- LS9 (18 metre self launching glider - 10 built)
- LS10 (15 metre Class and 18 metres Class)
- LS11 (Two Seater Class) - prototype in development by Akaflieg Köln

== Receivership ==
Because of difficult economic times, the company went into receivership in 2001. In 2003 DG Flugzeugbau GmbH took over the assets of the company including the LS brand name and designs. The LS8 and LS10 were produced by DG. The LS4, LS6 and LS11 are currently scheduled for production in Slovenia by AMS Flight.
