= Rolladen-Schneider LS4 =

Single-seat German glider

LS4
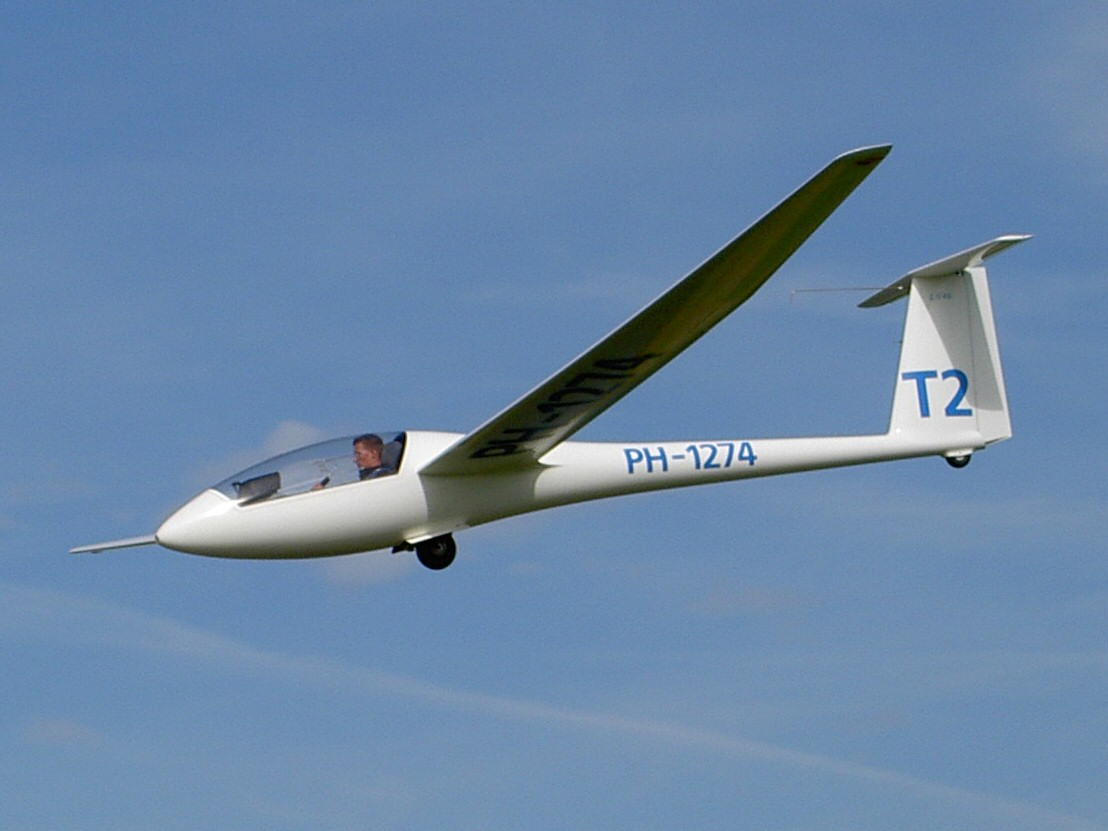

General information
- Type: Club-class (previously Standard-class) sailplane
- National origin: Germany
- Manufacturer: Rolladen-Schneider
- Number built: 1048

History
- First flight: 1980

The Rolladen-Schneider LS4 is a Standard Class single-seat glider manufactured by Rolladen-Schneider Flugzeugbau GmbH between 1980 and 2003.

== Development ==
The LS4, successor to the LS1 in the Standard Class, made its first flight in 1980. It is the fifth most produced non-military glider (after the Grunau Baby, Blaník, Schleicher K 8 trainers and Grob G102 Astir.) A total of 1,048 were built until Rolladen-Schneider entered receivership in 2003. Its long production run is comparable only to that of the Grob G102 Astir and the Schempp-Hirth Discus.

The LS4 won the first two places in the Standard Class at the 1981 World Championships in Paderborn, West Germany, and the first six places (and twenty-one out of the first twenty-five) at the 1983 World Championships in Hobbs, New Mexico. It is still a favourite in handicapped competitions and as a club and recreational aircraft.

This type consolidated Rolladen-Schneider's reputation for well-rounded sailplanes that are both easy to fly and top performers. It is docile enough for beginners and its performance is only slightly below the latest standard-class sailplanes.

The LS4 was succeeded by the LS7.

== Design ==
The design of the LS4 was influenced mainly by the experience Rolladen-Schneider had gained with the LS2 and LS3 flapped gliders. Wolf Lemke returned to a double-tapered wing planform, giving it a larger area comparatively to the LS1 and LS2, and enlarged all control surfaces: the ailerons were elongated and brought further inboard and the tailplane span was increased.

The fuselage and vertical stabilizer were taken from the LS3 moulds. Other notable features of the design were the retractable landing gear, the centre of gravity tow release that retracts with landing gear, the heel-operated wheel brakes, the upper wing surface air brakes and the water ballast system with internal bags.

=== Structure ===
The structure is entirely glass-reinforced plastic mostly with synthetic foam cores. The exterior coating, as with most composite gliders, is gelcoat, which protects the load-bearing composite from humidity and UV-radiation, and is thick enough to allow wing profiling, which is done by hand during the finishing stages of manufacturing to achieve the smoothness required for extensive laminar flow.

== Variants ==
LS4
The initial production version
LS4-a
featured larger water ballast bags allowing for an additional 15 L (3.96 US gal; 3.30 imp gal) of water to be carried in each wing. The landing gear system is strengthened by the addition of one extra set of shock absorption bumpers in order to handle the increased gross weight with a full water ballast load.

LS4-b
fin height increased by 0.11 m (4.3 in) to 1.43 m (4 ft 8 in). The -b fuselage is 0.13 m (5.1 in) shorter at 6.66 m (21.9 ft). The wing shells are made in carbon, control connections are automatic, the instrument panel tilts up with the canopy and it has an optional tail fin water ballast system.

== Specifications (LS4) ==
Data from Jane's All the World's Aircraft 1988-89

General characteristics

- Crew: 1
- Length: 6.83 m (22 ft 5 in)
- Wingspan: 15 m (49 ft 3 in)
- Height: 1.26 m (4 ft 2 in)
- Wing area: 10.5 m^{2} (113 sq ft)
- Aspect ratio: 21.4
- Airfoil: modified Wortmann sections
- Empty weight: 238 kg (525 lb)
- Max takeoff weight: 472 kg (1,041 lb)
- Water ballast: 140 L (37 US gal; 31 imp gal)

Performance

- Stall speed: 68 km/h (42 mph, 37 kn)
- Never exceed speed: 270 km/h (170 mph, 150 kn) in smooth air

180 km/h (97 kn; 110 mph) in rough air
180 km/h (97 kn; 110 mph) on aero-tow
130 km/h (70 kn; 81 mph) on winch launch

- g limits: +5.3 -2.65 at 180 km/h (97 kn; 110 mph); +4 -1.5 at 270 km/h (150 kn; 170 mph)
- Maximum glide ratio: 40.5 at 100 km/h (54 kn; 62 mph)
- Rate of sink: 0.61 m/s (120 ft/min) at 75 km/h (40 kn; 47 mph)
- Wing loading: 44.9 kg/m^{2} (9.2 lb/sq ft)
- IGC club class Handicap 102.5

== See also ==
Aircraft of comparable role, configuration, and era

- Glaser-Dirks DG-300
- Schempp-Hirth Discus
- Schleicher ASW 19

Related lists

- List of gliders
