= Rolladen-Schneider LS9 =

Single seat German motor glider, 1994

LS9
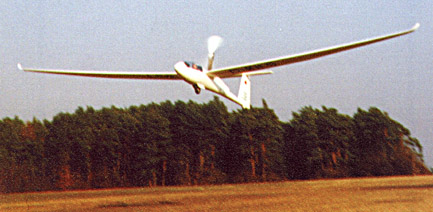

General information
- Type: 18 metre-class motorglider
- National origin: Germany
- Manufacturer: Rolladen-Schneider
- Number built: 10

History
- First flight: 1995

The Rolladen-Schneider LS9 is an 18 metre single-seat motor glider launched in 2000 by Rolladen-Schneider. Production ended after just 10 gliders were built, when Rolladen-Schneider went into receivership.

== Development ==
The LS9 was the sole self-launching glider developed at Rolladen-Schneider. The prototype first flew in 1995, powered by a Rotax 535 two-stroke engine. Production of this engine was discontinued by Rotax, putting the LS9 project on hold pending the development of a suitable engine.

The Solo 2625 engine and a Technoflug two-blade propeller were finally selected. The engine installation, including the carbon composite propeller mast and folding exhaust system, was developed by the specialist firm Walter Binder Motorenbau GmbH, having nearly 100% commonality with the Schempp-Hirth Ventus CM installation.

== Design ==
- Wings from the LS6-18w moulds, with strengthened spars and leading edges.
- Fuselage shape adapted from the LS4 by broadening the tail boom to accommodate the engine.
- All-new structure combining a new safety glass/carbon cockpit with a full carbon composite fuselage behind the wing.
- Empennage from the LS4 with new carbon and aramid composite construction.
- Larger undercarriage (5” hub) set further forward to prevent nose-over with the engine at full power.
- Innovative 210 mm x 65 mm steerable tailwheel integrated into the rudder directly under the hinge axis.
- Single aerotow/winching hook.
- Carbon composite propeller mast deployed by electric screw jack system.
- Engine recessed into the fuselage with electric starter, fuel and coolant pumps.
- Drive belt transmission to the large propeller.
- Stall warning system activated during powered flight.

== Specifications ==
General characteristics

- Crew: One
- Length: 6.84 m (22 ft 5 in)
- Wingspan: 18.00 m (59 ft 1 in)
- Height: 1.43 m (4 ft 8 in)
- Wing area: 11.4 m^{2} (123 sq ft)
- Aspect ratio: 28.4
- Empty weight: 350 kg (770 lb)
- Gross weight: 525 kg (1,155 lb)
- Powerplant: 1 × Solo 2625 , 41 kW (55 hp)

Performance

- Maximum speed: 270 km/h (170 mph, 150 kn)
- Range: 550 km (340 mi, 300 nmi)
- Maximum glide ratio: >47
- Rate of climb: 4.0 m/s (780 ft/min)
- Rate of sink: 0.58 m/s (114 ft/min)

== See also ==
Related lists

- List of gliders
