= Schleicher ASW 22 =

1980s German Open class glider

ASW 22
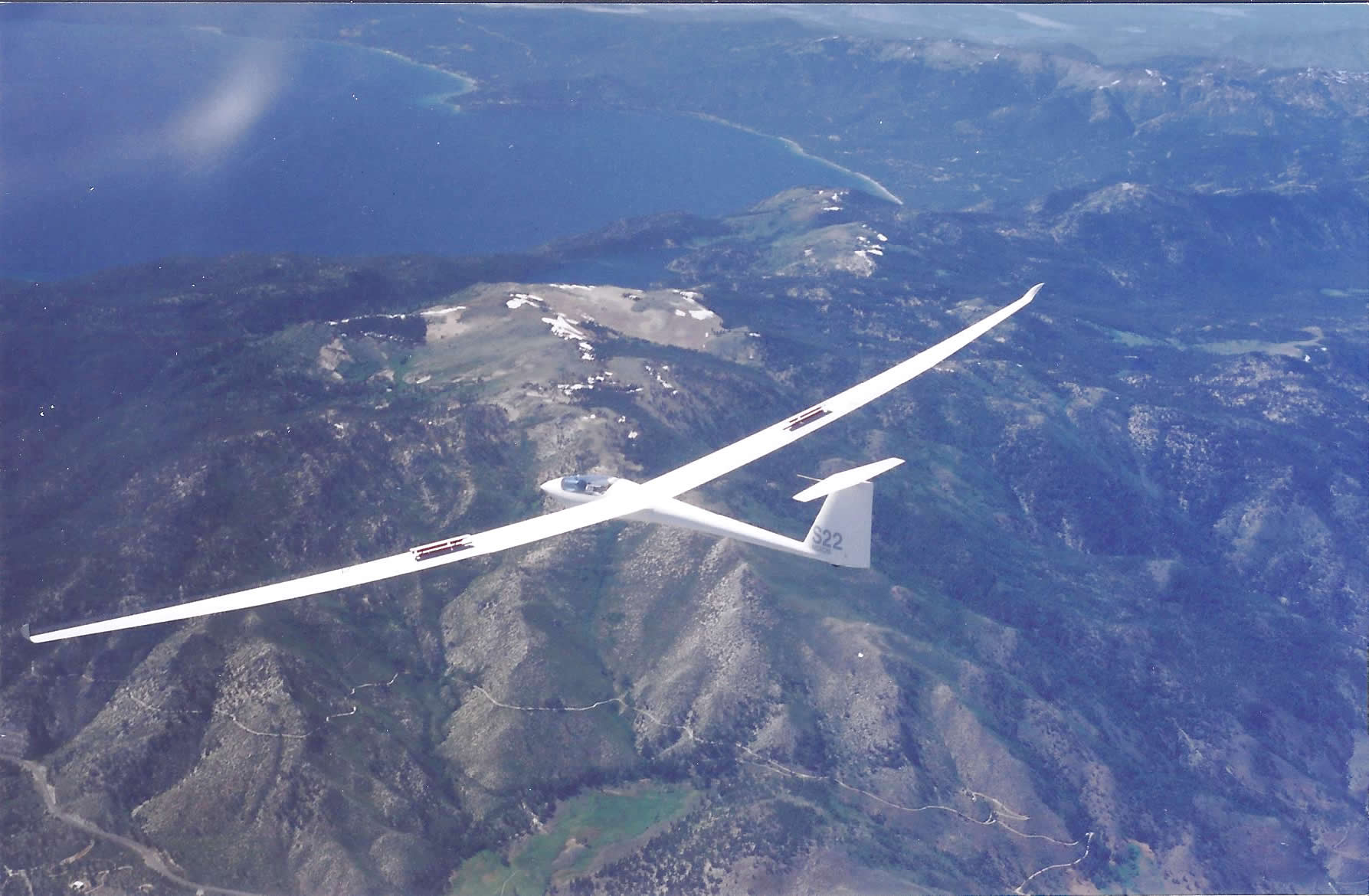
- Schleicher ASW22 flying in wave out of Minden NV

General information
- Type: Open-class sailplane
- National origin: Germany
- Manufacturer: Schleicher
- Designer: Gerhard Waibel
- Number built: 87

History
- First flight: 8 July 1981

The ASW 22 is an Open Class glider built by Alexander Schleicher GmbH & Co which first flew in 1981. The 'W' in the designation indicates that this is a product of the German designer Gerhard Waibel. An ASW 22 broke the world 750 km triangle speed record in 1985 and ASW 22s have won first place in six World Gliding Championships.

== Design ==
The ASW 22 is the successor to the ASW 17. It first flew as a 22-metre glider. The span was later increased to 25 metres for the ASW 22B with a modified inner wing section and flaperons similar to the ASW 20. It uses a Horstmann and Quast wing profile on the inner section with underwing tubes to collect high-pressure air which is then expelled through turbulator holes in the bottom wing skin ahead of the flap and aileron hinge line to prevent the separation of the laminar flow. The ASW 22 has a two-wheel retractable undercarriage.

== Variants ==
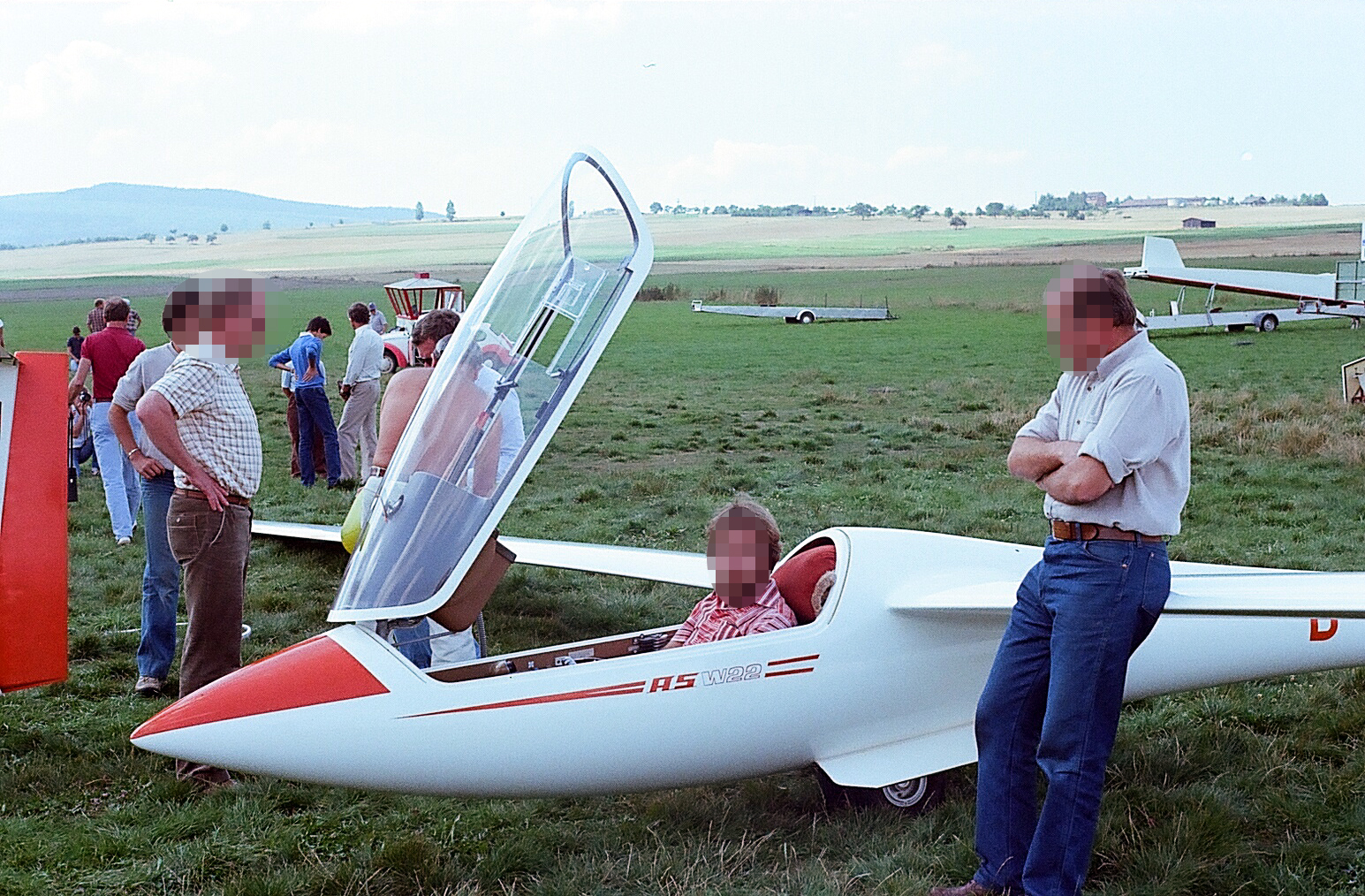
Schleicher ASW 22 prototype, 1982

ASW 22
Open Class high-performance sailplane; 22 or 24 metre span
ASW 22M
First motorized self-launching version with 22/24 m span, Rotax 505A engine
AS 22-2
The prototype of the ASH 25, which combined the wing of the ASW 22 with a two-seat fuselage
ASW 22B
Span increased to 25 m
ASW 22BL
Fitted with 26.4 m tips
ASW 22BE, BLE
self-launching versions with 49 hp Rotax 505A engine
ASW 22BLE 50R
self-launching version with 50 hp rotary engine
ASW 22DB
ETA biter A response to the Eta, from Gerhard Waibel and Dick Butler, derived from the ASW 22BL.

== Specifications (ASW 22BL) ==
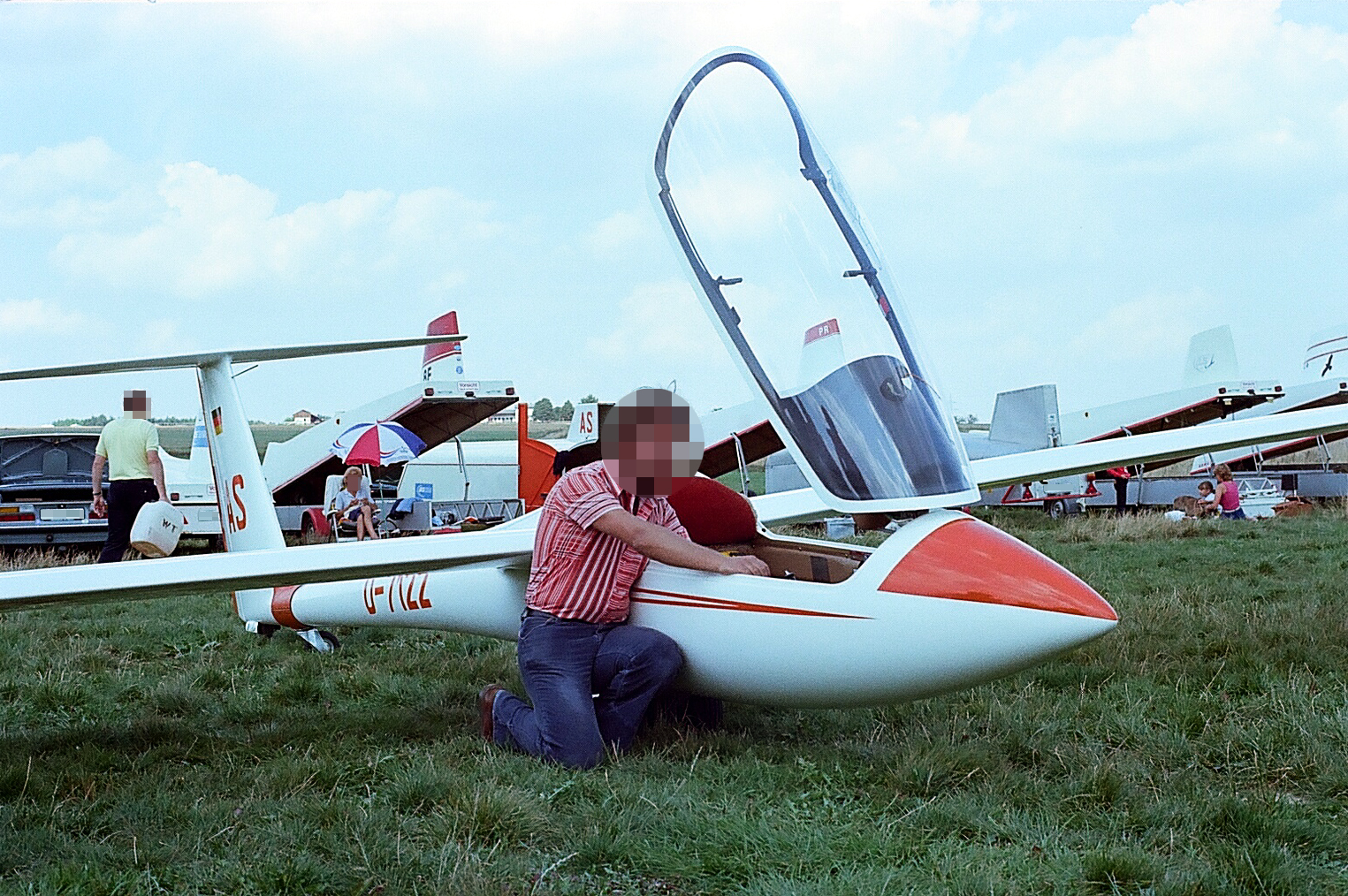
Schleicher ASW 22, 1982

Data from Jane's All the World's Aircraft 1988-89.

General characteristics

- Crew: 1
- Length: 8.1 m (26 ft 7 in)
- Wingspan: 26.58 m (87 ft 2 in)
- Height: 1.66 m (5 ft 5 in)
- Wing area: 16.7 m^{2} (180 sq ft)
- Aspect ratio: 38.3
- Airfoil: root:DFVLR HQ17-14.28; tip:Delft university DU84-132
- Empty weight: 465 kg (1,025 lb)
- Max takeoff weight: 850 kg (1,874 lb)
- Water ballast: 235 L (62 US gal; 52 imp gal)

Performance

- Stall speed: 65 km/h (40 mph, 35 kn)
- Never exceed speed: 280 km/h (170 mph, 150 kn)
- g limits: +5.3 -2.65
- Maximum glide ratio: 62 at 95 km/h (51 kn; 59 mph)
- Rate of sink: 0.41 m/s (81 ft/min) at 67 km/h (36 kn; 42 mph)
- Wing loading: 33.4 kg/m^{2} (6.8 lb/sq ft)

== See also ==
Related development

- Schleicher ASH 25

Aircraft of comparable role, configuration, and era

- Schempp-Hirth Nimbus 4

Related lists

- List of gliders
