= LAK-17 =

Lithuanian sailplane

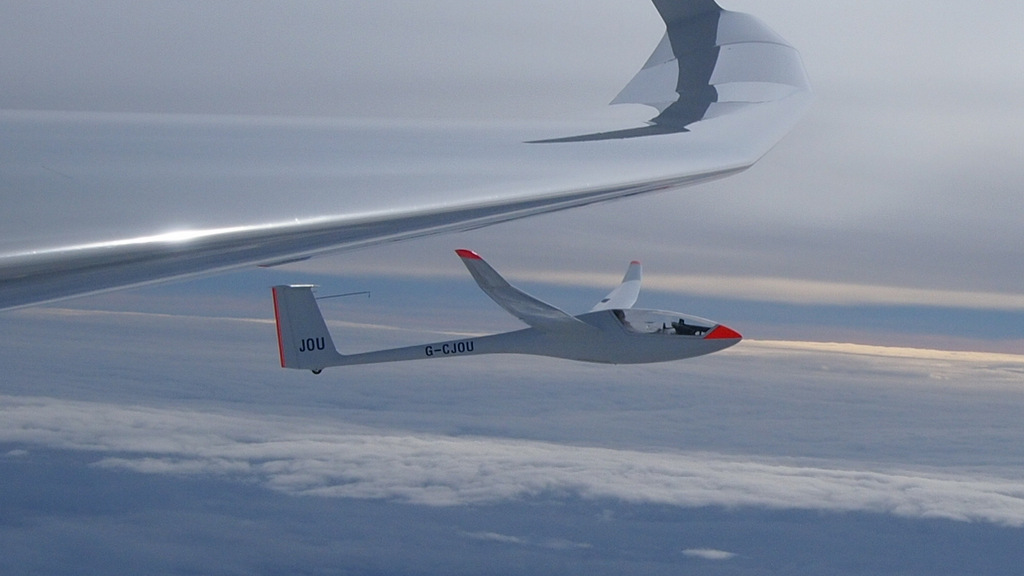

General information
- Type: 15 metre-class and 18 metre-class sailplane
- National origin: Lithuania
- Manufacturer: Sportinė Aviacija
- Status: In production (2015)

The LAK-17 is a Lithuanian single-seat sailplane that was designed at the Lithuanian Aero Club (Lithuanian: Lietuviškos aviacinės konstrukcijos or LAK), and is manufactured by Sportinė Aviacija.

== Design and development ==
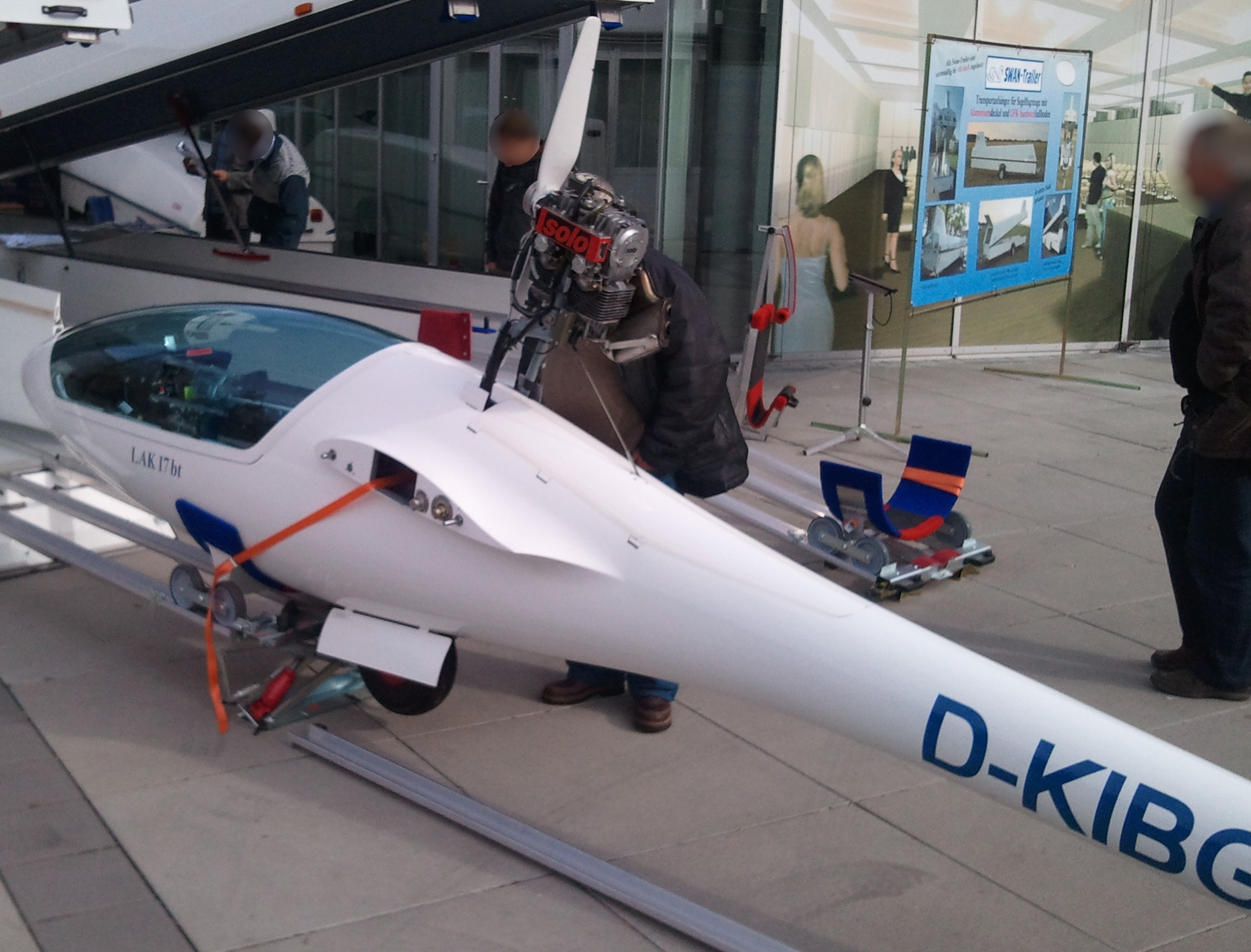
LAK-17bt fuselage and engine

The LAK-17 is designed to meet the requirements of the utility category of JAR-22. It is a single-seat mid-wing sailplane of composite construction with a T-tail and flaps, it has a retractable single-wheel main landing gear and has airbrakes on the upper wing surface. The airfoil is a combination of the LAP92-130/15, at its roots, and the LAP-92-150/15, at its tips. The LAK-17 holds water ballast in tanks in the wing and fin. The LAK-17A was certified in November 1994 by the Lithuanian Civil Aviation Authority. A new variant with an improved wing was designated the LAK-17B. All variants have a 15.00 m (49.21 ft) wingspan but a wing with span increased to 18.00 m (59.06 ft) is available as an option; powered self-sustaining versions are also produced.

An optional front electric sustainer engine variant was developed for the LAK-17 by Slovenian engineers at LZ Design. It originally had a 0.9 metre propeller, and the latest versions have a 1.0 metre propeller in the nose driven by an electric motor.

== Variants ==
LAK-17A
Production flapped 15- or 18-metre wingspan sailplane.
LAK-17AT
Powered self-sustaining sailplane variant of the LAK-17A with a Solo 2350 two-cylinder air-cooled two-stroke retractable engine.
LAK-17A FES
A LAK-17A with a front electric sustainer.
LAK-17B
Improved variant with new wing profile and modified geometry.
LAK-17BT
Powered self-sustaining sailplane variant of the LAK-17B with a Solo 2350 retractable engine.
LAK-17B FES
A LAK-17B with a front electric sustainer.
LAK-17C FES
Improved variant with aerodynamic changes as well as a raised undercarriage to provide increased ground clearance for the folding propeller and increased battery capacity for self launching.

== Specifications (LAK-17A with 15 metre wingspan) ==
Data from

General characteristics

- Crew: one
- Capacity: 188 kg (414 lb) water ballast
- Length: 6.53 m (21 ft 5 in)
- Wingspan: 15.00 m (49 ft 2 in)
- Height: 1.29 m (4 ft 3 in)
- Wing area: 9.06 m^{2} (97 sq ft)
- Aspect ratio: 24.63
- Empty weight: 245 kg (540 lb)
- Gross weight: 500 kg (1,102 lb)

Performance

- Maximum speed: 275 km/h (171 mph, 149 kn)
- Maximum glide ratio: 45
- Rate of sink: 0.53 m/s (104 ft/min)
