= Eta (glider) =

German-Italian two-seat motor glider, 2000

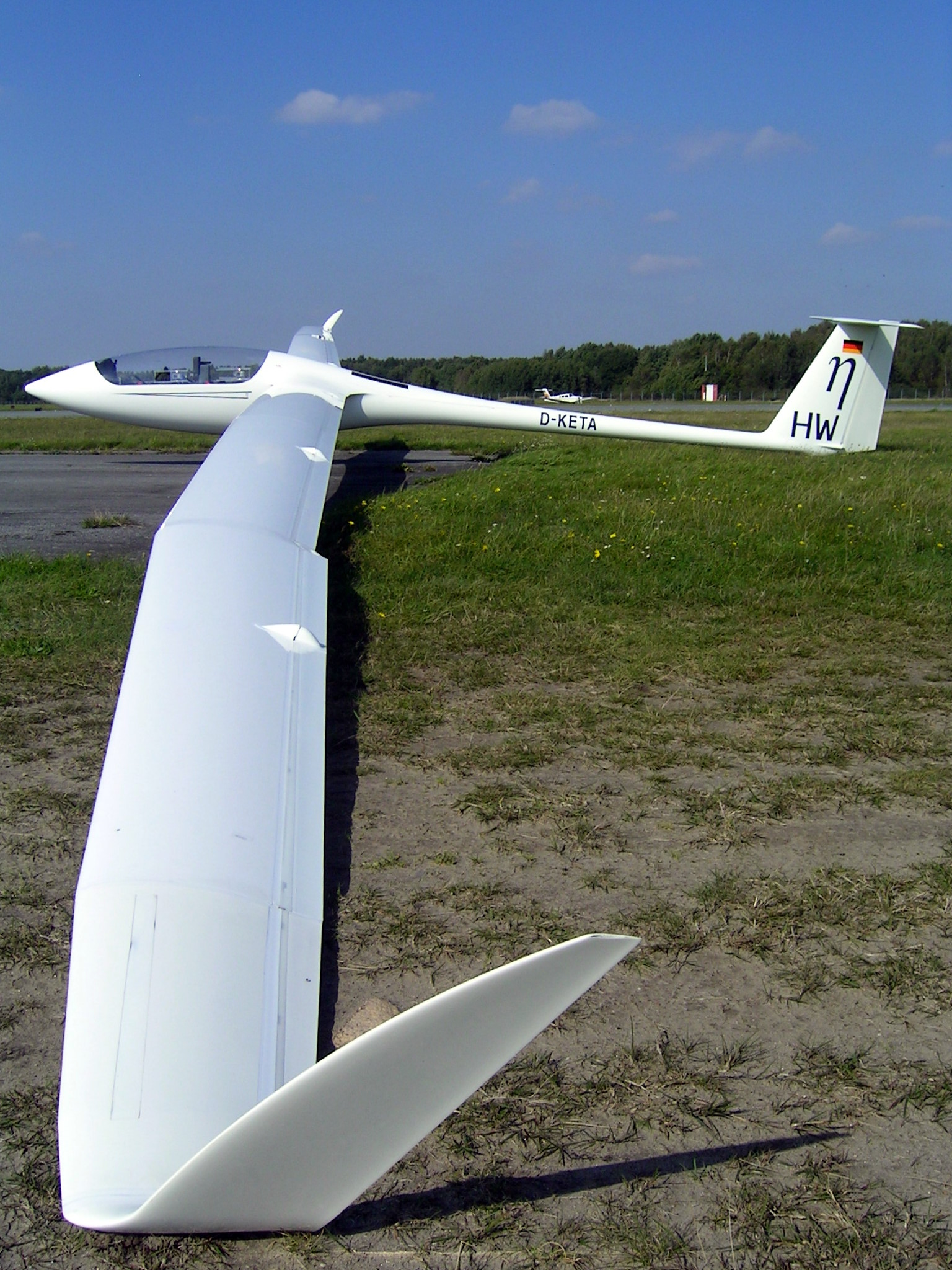
- Eta at Lübeck airport

General information
- Type: Open-class sailplane
- National origin: Germany
- Manufacturer: Consortium
- Designer: Flugtechnik Leichtbau, Braunschweig, led by Reiner Kickert
- Number built: 6 (+ 1 Nimeta)

History
- First flight: 31 July 2000

The Eta is a German-Italian Open Class two-seater flapped self-launching glider manufactured by ETA Aircraft. On introduction it was the highest performing glider.

== Early flights ==
The Eta made its first flight on July 31, 2000 in Cochstedt, Germany, reaching a height of 2 m (7 ft). The second flight was the first aerotow launch, reaching 1,500 m (4,920 ft). The third flight was self powered and had no problems. The official presentation was on 1 August.

== Production ==
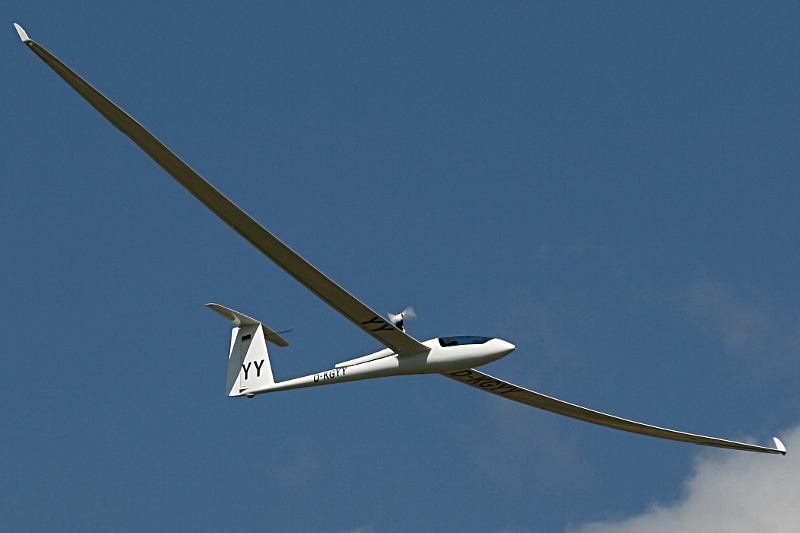
Glasfaser Nimeta: Eta wings on Nimbus 4 fuselage with motor

Three Etas have been manufactured. The second prototype was extensively damaged in 2003 during the spin tests required for the type certification but both pilots parachuted to safety. The prototype was repaired and the tests completed successfully. The glider was to be produced by hand at a rate of about three per year.

== Development ==
The Eta is an example of a trend in glider development in which private pilots initiate the development of new open class gliders. The private development of the Concordia sailplane promises a further elevation of the max lift-to-drag ratio to slightly over 75 at 137 km/h (85 mph; 74 kn).

== Operational history ==
An Eta participated in a World Championship for the first time in 2003 at Leszno. Its pilot, Janusz Centka, achieved an overall second place. Good placings have also been achieved by the Eta in later competitions. The glider is however hampered by the Open Class weight limitation which limits its wing loading in strong weather to the advantage of its opponents.

== Specifications ==
Data from Simons (2005) p.99

General characteristics

- Crew: Two
- Length: 9.75 m (32 ft 0 in)
- Wingspan: 30.90 m (101 ft 5 in)
- Wing area: 18.61 m^{2} (200.3 sq ft)
- Aspect ratio: 51.33
- Airfoil: HQR 2 inboard, HQR 1 outboard
- Empty weight: 710 kg (1,565 lb)
- Gross weight: 850 kg (1,874 lb)
- Maximum wing loading: 44.8 kg/m^{2} (9.18 lb/sqft)
- Powerplant: 1 × Solo 2625-02 twin cylinder inline two stroke piston engine, 47 kW (63 hp) approximately
- Propellers: 2-bladed carbon reinforced plastic propeller, pulley driven on folding column

Performance

- Maximum glide ratio: 70 at 108 km/h
- Rate of sink: 0.4 m/s (79 ft/min)

== See also ==
- Schleicher ASW 22
- Binder EB29
