= Akaflieg Darmstadt D-36 Circe =

German single-seat glider, 1964

D-36 Circe
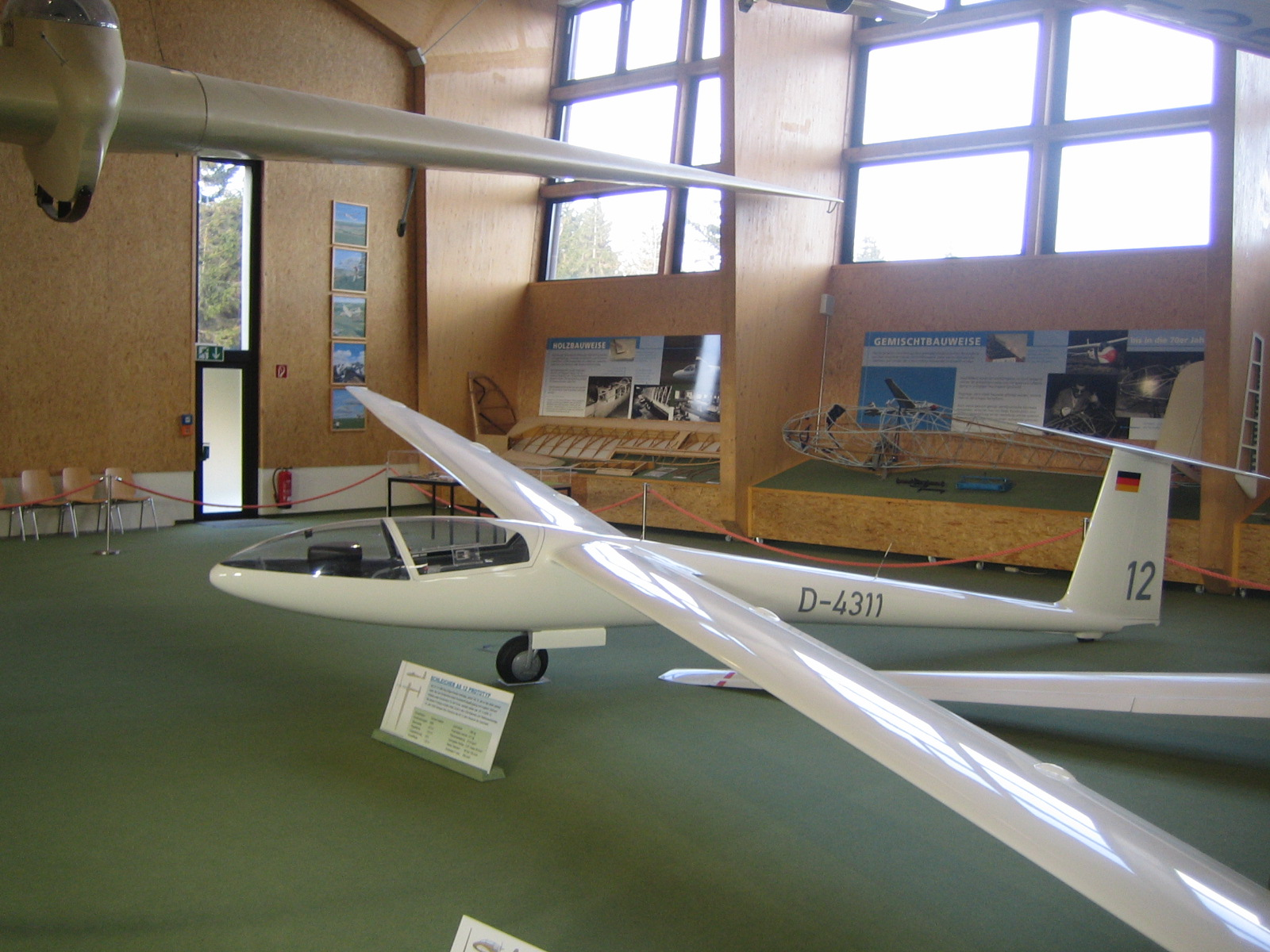
- The Schleicher ASW 12. This production glider was based closely on the D-36 Circe

General information
- Type: High performance sailplane
- National origin: Germany
- Manufacturer: Akaflieg Darmstadt
- Designer: Wolfe Lemke, Gerhard Waibel and Heiko Friess
- Number built: 2

History
- First flight: 28 March 1964
- Developed into: Schleicher ASW 12

The Akaflieg Darmstadt D-36 Circe is a single seat, high performance sailplane designed and built in Germany in the mid-1960s, one of the early "glass ships". It was the winner at the German National Championships in 1964 and came second in the World Championships the following year.

== Design and development ==
The Akademische Fliegergruppe of the Technical University of Darmstadt (Akaflieg Darmstadt) was first formed in 1921. It was, and is, a group of aeronautical students who design and construct aircraft as part of their studies and with the help and encouragement of their University. Design work on the Circe began in 1962-3 by a team of students, Wolf Lemke (responsible for the wing), Gerhard Waibel (fuselage and tail) and Heiko Friess (airbrakes). They were later joined by the younger Klaus Holighaus. Professor Franz Wortmann designed a new airfoil for the Circe. Construction began in 1963 and the aircraft flew for the first time, piloted by Wolf Lemke, on 28 March 1964 at Gelnhausen.

The Circe is built from composite materials, with flying surfaces and fuselage shells made from glass-balsa-glass sandwiches. The wings have a single spar with flanges of aligned glass fibre (uni-directional rovings) and a glass-balsa sandwich web. The fuselage has GRP-balsa stiffening cross-members. The wing is tapered in two sections, with more taper on the outer 40% of the span. Such double taper plans can provide lift/drag ratios close to that of the ideal elliptical wing, and have benign stall characteristics. Ailerons occupy all the trailing edge of the outer panels, with flaps across the inner panels. Four sets of Schempp-Hirth airbrakes, two per wing, are located just behind the spar, roughly centred on the inner panels. Each set extends its surfaces, mounted like parallel rulers, above and below the wing. They were difficult to design because of the considerable flexure of the wing, the latter leading to the Circe's nickname of Gummiflügel (English: Rubberwing) at a time of stiffer structures.

The fuselage of the Circe is slender and circular in cross section aft of the shoulder mounted wings. The vertical tail is tall and rather upright, with some forward sweep on the rudder trailing edge. The original horizontal T-tail was straight tapered in plan, with sweep only on the leading edge. Forward of the wing leading edge the cockpit, housing the pilot in semi-reclining position, has a long, two piece canopy which swells above the rear fuselage line. The rear part of the canopy opens for access. The Circe has a retractable monowheel undercarriage, assisted by a tail bumper.

The testing that followed the first flight showed that there was a tendency to tail flutter, so a long, projecting mass balance was added at the centre of the tailplane. The whole tail was later redesigned by Holighaus who produced a shorter fin and rudder and got rid of the sweep of the original horizontal surface by adding forward swept elevators. The tailplane was also significantly reduced in size.

At about the same time as the V-1 was being constructed at Darmstadt, a second Circe, the V-2, was built by Walter Schneider. It differed from the V-1 in having a parachute brake rather than the spoilers of the V-1 and turned out rather heavier.

== Operational history ==
The V-1, flown by Waibel, won the German National Championships of 1964. Rolf Spärig flew it the following year in the 1965 World Championships, held at RAF South Cerney, Gloucestershire, UK, but was beaten into second place in the open class by the Polish Foka 4 flown by Jan Wroblewski, despite the Circe's better glide ratio. Most agreed the Circe was the most advanced sailplane at the Championships but that the Polish pilot's tactics were superior, not least as the Foka was a 15 m, standard class sailplane. During practice for the Championships, Spärig had flown the first-ever 500 km (311 mi) triangle in Germany.

The V-1 flew for another three years before suffering an in-flight structural failure and destruction. The pilot, Heli Lasch escaped by parachute. An investigation blamed him rather than the aircraft; the then still-novel glass sailplanes accelerated quickly and speed was easily misjudged when the traditional indicators, such as attitude or sound, were used. The V-2 remained active until the mid-2000s.

== Variants ==
D-36 Circe V-1
Darmstadt built, Schempp-Hirth airbrakes.
D-36 Circe V-2
Built by Walter Schneider, drag parachute brake, heavier.

== Aircraft on display ==
The Schneider built D-36 V-2, D-4686, is on display at the Deutsches Segelflugmuseum mit Modellflug, Wasserkuppe, Germany.

== Specifications (V-1) ==
Data from Sailplanes 1945-1965

General characteristics

- Crew: 1
- Length: 7.35 m (24 ft 1 in)
- Wingspan: 17.80 m (58 ft 5 in)
- Wing area: 12.8 m^{2} (138 sq ft)
- Aspect ratio: 24.8
- Airfoil: Inner panel Wortmann FX61 - 131K (the K indicating flaps); at tips, Wortmann FX60 - 126
- Empty weight: 285 kg (628 lb)
- Gross weight: 410 kg (904 lb)

Performance

- Maximum glide ratio: best, 44:1
- Wing loading: 32.0 kg/m^{2} (6.6 lb/sq ft)

== See also ==
Related lists

- List of gliders
