= Thickness-to-chord ratio =

Ratio in aeronautics

a=chord, b=thickness, thickness-to-chord ratio = b/a

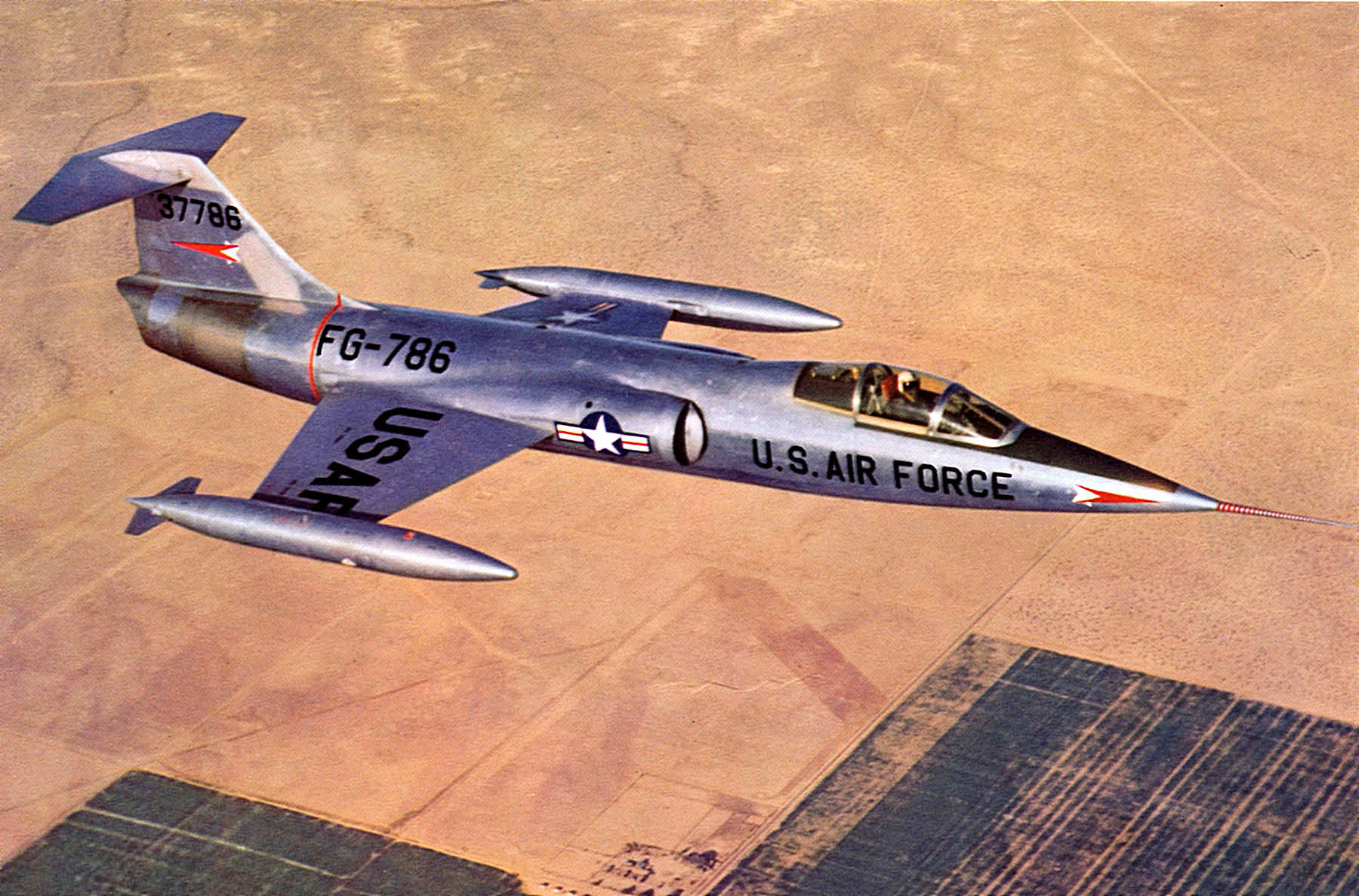
The F-104 wing has a very low thickness-to-chord ratio of 3.36%

In aeronautics, the thickness-to-chord ratio, sometimes simply chord ratio or thickness ratio, compares the maximum vertical thickness of a wing to its chord. It is a key measure of the performance of a wing planform when it is operating at transonic speeds.

At speeds approaching the speed of sound, the effects of Bernoulli's principle over curves on the wing and fuselage can accelerate the local flow to supersonic speeds. This creates a shock wave that produces a powerful form of drag known as wave drag, and gives rise to the concept of the sound barrier. The speed at which these shocks first form, critical mach, is a function of the amount of curvature. In order to reduce wave drag, wings should have the minimum curvature possible while still generating the required amount of lift. So, the main reason for decreasing the blade section thickness to chord ratio is to delay the compressibility effect related to higher Mach numbers, delaying the onset of a shock wave formation.

The natural outcome of this requirement is a wing design that is thin and wide, which has a low thickness-to-chord ratio. At lower speeds, undesirable parasitic drag is largely a function of the total surface area, which suggests using a wing with minimum chord, leading to the high aspect ratios seen on light aircraft and regional airliners. Such designs naturally have high thickness-to-chord ratios. Designing an aircraft that operates across a wide range of speeds, like a modern airliner, requires these competing needs to be carefully balanced for every aircraft design.

Swept wings are a practical outcome of the desire to have a low thickness-to-chord ratio at high speeds and a lower one at lower speeds during takeoff and landing. The sweep stretches the chord as seen by the airflow, while still keeping the wetted area of the wing to a minimum. For practical reasons, wings tend to be thickest at the root, where they meet the fuselage. For this reason, it is common for wings to taper their chord towards the tips, keeping the thickness-to-chord ratio close to constant, this also reduces induced drag at lower speeds. The crescent wing is another solution to the design to keep a relatively constant thickness-to-chord ratio.

Airliners	Area (m^{2})	Span (m)	Aspect Ratio	Taper Ratio	Average (t/c) %	1/4 Chord Sweep (°)"
ERJ 145	51.18	20.04	7.85	0.231	11.00	22.73
CRJ100	54.54	20.52	7.72	0.288	10.83	24.75
Avro RJ	77.30	26.21	8.89	0.356	12.98	15.00
737 Original/Classic	91.04	28.35	8.83	0.266	12.89	25.00
DC-9	92.97	28.47	8.72	0.206	11.60	24.00
Boeing 717	92.97	28.40	8.68	0.196	11.60	24.50
Fokker 100/70	93.50	28.08	8.43	0.235	10.28	17.45
MD-80/MD-90	112.30	32.87	9.62	0.195	11.00	24.50
A320	122.40	33.91	9.39	0.240	11.92	25.00
737 NG	124.60	34.30	9.44	0.278		25.00
Boeing 727	157.90	32.92	6.86	0.309	11.00	32.00
Boeing 757	185.25	38.05	7.82	0.243		25.00
A310	219.00	43.89	8.80	0.283	11.80	28.00
A300	260.00	44.84	7.73	0.300	10.50	28.00
DC-8	271.90	45.23	7.52	0.181	11.00	30.00
Boeing 767	283.30	47.57	7.99	0.207	11.50	31.50
Boeing 707	283.40	44.42	6.96	0.259	10.00	35.00
MMD-11	338.90	51.77	7.91	0.239	9.35	35.00
A330/A340-200/300	363.10	58.00	9.26	0.251	11.80	29.70
DC-10	367.70	50.40	6.91	0.220	11.00	35.00
Boeing 777	427.80	60.90	8.67	0.149		31.60
A340-500/600	437.30	61.20	8.56	0.220		31.10
747 Classic	511.00	59.64	6.96	0.284	9.40	37.50
747-400	525.00	62.30	7.39	0.275	9.40	37.50
MD-12	543.00	64.92	7.76	0.215		35.00
A3XX	817.00	79.80	7.79	0.213		30.00

regional
narrowbody
widebody
double-deck
