= Franz Xaver Wortmann =

German engineer (1921–1985)

- Born: 25 September 1921
- Died: 16 January 1985 (aged 63)
- Occupation: Aerodynamicist
- Employer(s): Institute of Aerodynamics and Gas Dynamics at the University of Stuttgart
- Known for: Aerofoil sections

Franz Xaver Wortmann (September 24, 1921 - January 16, 1985) was a German aerodynamicist.

== Early life ==
After World War II, Wortmann spent time as a pilot and observer with the German Air Force. He then studied physics in Münster and Stuttgart. After graduating in the field of fluid theory he completed his doctorate as an engineer in 1955. His habilitation followed in 1963.

Together with Richard Eppler and Dieter Althaus, Wortmann carried out ground-breaking work in the late 1950s and the 1960s in the field of development of laminar flow airfoil profiles using the inverse design method. His wing profile designs are known by the FX (for Franz Xaver) in their code. These wing profiles were used in many of the first and second generation of fibre-reinforced plastic gliders. By the early 1970s, many successful designs of glider had a wing based on a Wortmann profile.

In 1974 Wortmann took over the leadership of the Institute of Aerodynamics and Gas Dynamics at the University of Stuttgart. He mainly investigated questions of turbulence.
