= Wolf Lemke =

- Born: August 11, 1938
- Died: December 1, 2018
- Engineering career
- Discipline: Glider design
- Institutions: Rolladen Schneider, DG Flugzeugbau GmbH
- Employer(s): Rolladen Schneider, DG Flugzeugbau GmbH
- Projects: LS-1, D-36 "Circe" (as part of Akaflieg Darmstadt)
- Significant design: LS series of gliders

Wolf Lemke (August 11, 1938- December 1, 2018) was a designer of gliders who worked for Rolladen Schneider and after it was taken over in 2003, for DG Flugzeugbau GmbH.

== Life ==
He was one of the student members of the Akaflieg Darmstadt who designed the revolutionary D-36 "Circe" in the period 1962 to 1964. This team also included Heiko Fries, Klaus Holighaus and Gerhard Waibel. While the members of the Akaflieg built the D-36 (V1), a common friend of the students – Walter Schneider – built a second D-36 (V2) in his shutters factory. Walter Schneider almost killed himself in it when he took a winch launch with a disconnected elevator but he parachuted to safety. Soon after the success of the D-36 Walter Schneider asked Wolf Lemke to design and build gliders professionally in his shutters factory – which then became a glider manufacturer as well.

His most significant design was the LS 1 which he first flew in May 1967. It was built by Walter Schneider, at first under the name Segelflugzeugbau Schneider OHG, but later as Rolladen Schneider Flugzeugbau GmbH.

Two LS 1 prototypes flew in the German Championships in 1968: Helmut Reichmann and Walter Schneider placed first and second out of 44 competitors in the Standard Class. All gliders designed by Wolf Lemke to date have the designation LS (Lemke and Schneider), including the LS-11 built by the Akaflieg Köln.
