= Rolladen-Schneider LS2 =

Single seat German glider, 1973

LS2
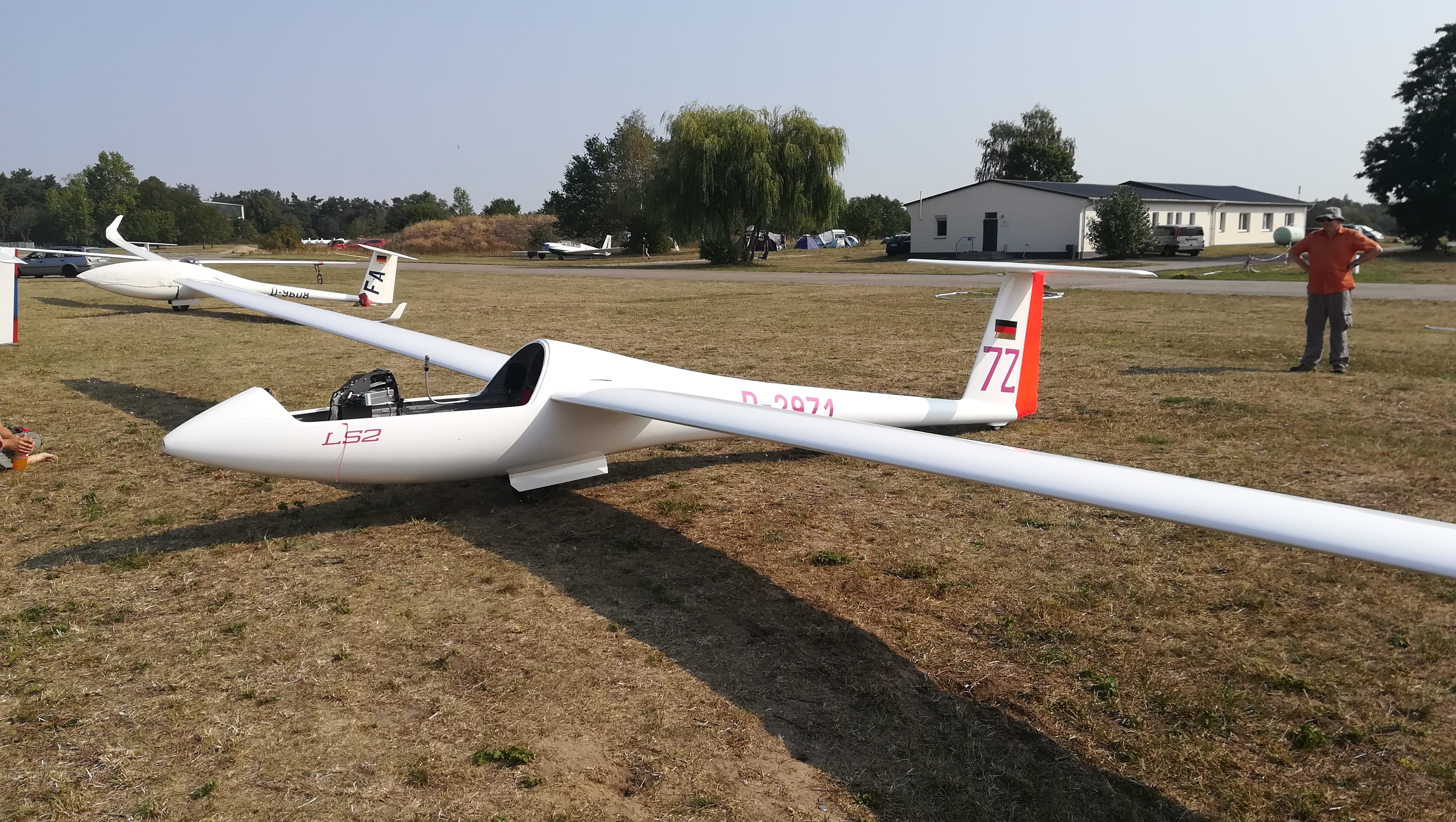

General information
- Type: Standard-class sailplane
- National origin: Germany
- Manufacturer: Rolladen-Schneider
- Number built: 1

History
- First flight: 1973

The Rolladen-Schneider LS2 is a 15-metre span single seat glider prototype with trailing-edge flaps, designed and built by Rolladen-Schneider Flugzeugbau GmbH c. 1973.

The LS2 was designed by Wolf Lemke and Walter Schneider in response to changes in the Standard Class rules. Only one example was built.

First flown in 1973, it won the German Championships that year. Helmut Reichmann competing in the LS2 won the 14th World championships in Waikerie, Australia in 1974.

== Design ==
The design was nevertheless unsatisfactory. The flaps occupied most of the trailing edge of the wing, being intended both as a means to control speed and improve climb rates in narrow thermals. Class rules did not allow these surfaces to be coupled to the ailerons. The resultant sluggish roll rate from the very short ailerons led to poor and unsafe flying characteristics. Thrice World Champion Helmut Reichmann reportedly said the performance advantages were not worth the extra pilot workload.

The LS2 highlighted inconsistencies in the rules that promoted unwise design trends, with trade-offs having to be made by designers between competitiveness and safety. Many observers also felt that trailing-edge flaps were against the spirit of the Standard Class, an issue that affected other types such as the PIK-20, Open-class Libelle and Schreder HP-8.

The International Gliding Commission voted in a new set of rules in 1974, prohibiting any lift-enhancing devices in the Standard Class and creating the 15 metre Class where these were allowed without any restriction.

== Specifications ==
General characteristics

- Crew: One
- Length: 6.80 m (22 ft 4 in)
- Wingspan: 15.00 m (49 ft 3 in)
- Wing area: 10.3 m^{2} (111 sq ft)
- Empty weight: 240 kg (530 lb)
- Gross weight: 360 kg (790 lb)

Performance

- Maximum glide ratio: 40
- Rate of sink: 0.65 m/s (128 ft/min)

== See also ==
Related lists

- List of gliders
