= Akaflieg =

- Type: Non-profit
- Genre: Aviation research
- Founded: 1951
- Headquarters: Germany
- Website: www.akaflieg.de

Akaflieg is an abbreviation for Akademische Fliegergruppe, groups of aeronautical engineering students from individual German universities of technology and Technische Hochschulen, pre and postwar, who design aircraft, often gliders.

== History ==
Otto Lilienthal published his book Der Vogelflug als Grundlage der Fliegekunst (Birdflight as the Basis of Aviation) in 1889. This described the basics of modern aerodynamics and aircraft construction. Lilienthal then made many successful flights starting in 1891. However, attention then shifted to powered flight after World War I.

Gliding re-emerged as a sport after the war because the building of powered aircraft was restricted in Germany by the Treaty of Versailles. The main originator of the gliding movement was Oskar Ursinus, who in 1920 organised the first contest, known as the Rhön-Contest, on the Wasserkuppe. Thereafter, the contest was held annually. Students of Technische Hochschulen brought gliders which they had developed and built themselves for testing to these contests. An esprit de corps developed known as Rhöngeist.

These informal beginnings caused the formation of groups of engineers at Technische Hochschulen with the aim of scientific and practical education. The first groups were formed in 1920 in Aachen, Darmstadt and Berlin-Charlottenburg, but others soon followed.

Many of the first members had been pilots in the German Air Force. However, it was the love of flying rather than militarism or nationalism that motivated them. As a result, a fraternal spirit was created that has been maintained to this day.

During the Nazi period some Akafliegs escaped regulation for a while through the patronage of the Deutsche Versuchsanstalt für Luftfahrt (DVL), a forerunner of the present-day German Aerospace Center (DLR), however shortly before World War II the akafliegs were forced to integrate into the NS-Deutsche Studentenbund (Nazi-students-federation). The projects at this time mainly had a military application.

== Present day ==
After the war, the Akafliegs re-formed in 1951, co-ordinated by Interessengemeinschaft Deutscher Akademischer Fliegergruppen e.V. (Idaflieg). As of 2009 there are ten groups.

The aim of the Akafliegs is the development, design and construction of aeroplanes, especially gliders and scientific research into flight. Much of the practical work is done at the summer meetings of the Idaflieg in co-operation with the German Aerospace Center (DLR), while the results of the research are presented at the winter meetings. The Idaflieg also offers many events and courses to its members such as the specification, design and certification of aeroplanes.

The quality of additional education provided by the Akafliegs is widely respected and so German glider manufacturers recruit almost exclusively from the Akafliegs.

Members have to devote approximately 150 to 300 man-hours annually in order to be able to fly with the Akafliegs. The cost of flying for these members is usually much lower than at other gliding clubs.

American Universities have also implemented programs similar to the Akafliegs but based around the American style of teaching, Penn State's AERSP 404H is one example of this implementation.

Akaflieg Berlin
Technische Universität Berlin

Akaflieg Braunschweig
Technische Universität Braunschweig

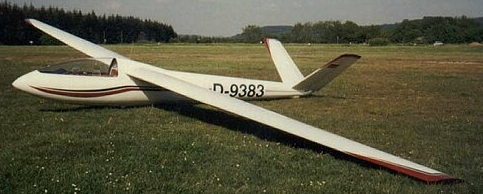
Akaflieg Braunschweig SB-5 Danzig

Akaflieg Darmstadt
Technical University of Darmstadt

Akaflieg Dresden
Dresden University of Technology

Akaflieg Erlangen
University of Erlangen–Nuremberg

Akaflieg Hamburg
Hamburg University of Technology

Akaflieg Hannover
Leibniz University Hannover

Akaflieg Karlsruhe
Karlsruhe Institute of Technology

Akaflieg Köln
University of Cologne

Akaflieg München
Technical University of Munich
Munich University of Applied Sciences
LMU Munich

Akaflieg Stuttgart
University of Stuttgart

Akaflieg Wilhelmshaven
Jade University of Applied Sciences

Flugwissenschaftliche Vereinigung Aachen (FV Aachen)
RWTH Aachen University

Flugwissenschaftliche Arbeitsgemeinschaft Bremen (FWAG Bremen)

Flugtechnische Arbeitsgemeinschaft Esslingen (FTAG Esslingen)
Esslingen University of Applied Sciences

There are also academical gliding clubs with other focus than building aircraft, like the Akaflieg Frankfurt which is devoted on research of thermals, mountain wave and flight safety.
