= Glider competition classes =

Classification of unpowered aircraft

Competition classes in gliding, as in other sports, mainly exist to ensure fairness in competition. However the classes have not been targeted at fostering technological development as in other sports. Instead classes have arisen because of:

- the popularity of certain types of glider
- attempts to contain the cost of access to the sport
- the need to establish a stable environment for investment decisions by both manufacturers and competitors.

The FAI Gliding Commission (IGC) is the sporting body overseeing air sports at the international level so that essentially the same classes and class definitions are followed in all countries.

== FAI Competition Classes ==
Seven glider classes are currently recognised by the FAI and are eligible for European and World Championships:

- Open Class, places no restrictions, may be one- or two-seater e.g. JS-1C, Lange Antares 23E, Quintus, ASW 22, ASH 30, LAK-20.
- Standard Class, restricted to a maximum wing-span of 15 metres and fixed wing sections (flaps or other lift-enhancing devices not allowed), e.g. ASW 28, LS8, Discus-2, LAK-19.
- 15 metre Class, as Standard Class with lift-enhancing devices allowed, e.g. ASG 29, LS6, Ventus-3, Diana 2.
- 18 metre Class, as the 15 metre Class with wing-spans up to 18 metres. Introduced in 2001. E.g. AS 33, LS10, DG-808, Ventus-3, LAK-17.
- 20 metre Two-Seater Class, restricted to a maximum wing-span of 20 metres. Introduced in 2014. E.g. Duo Discus, DG-1000, Arcus, ASG 32
- Club Class, allows a wide range of older small gliders within a specified range of performances, e.g. Libelle, Standard Cirrus, LS1, with the scores being adjusted by handicapping. Disposable (i.e. water) ballast may be installed but must not be used in this class.
- 13.5 metre, with maximum wing-span of 13.5 metres.

Gliding World Records are classified by the FAI under sub-classes that do not have a one-to-one correspondence with the above competition classes:

- DO - Open Class, accepts sporting performances achieved with any glider type. Sporting performances by Open, 18 metre and Two Seaters are eligible only for this sub-class.
- D15 - 15 metre Class, accepts sporting performances achieved with gliders whose wing-span is smaller than or equal to 15 metres.
- DW - World Class, for sporting performances by World Class gliders only, though this category may be amended given the abolition of the class for competition.
- DU - Ultralight Class, for sporting performances by gliders having maximum mass below 220 kg, e.g. the SparrowHawk, Apis WR, Silent 2 Targa. A subdivision of the ultralight class, known as the microlift gliders have a wingloading not exceeding 18 kg/m^{2}. Types include the Carbon Dragon, AL12 Alatus and the Lighthawk. Microlift gliders do not have separate world records.

== Non-FAI Classes ==
Glider classes not recognised by the FAI have been used in some regional and national competitions. The most significant of these are:

- Sports Class, a handicapped class similar in concept to the Club Class but allowing a wider range of gliders, usually both flapped and unflapped and with spans not limited to 15 metres. This class is often used in competitions where the number of entries is too small to warrant subdivision of the participants into separate classes.
- 1-26 Class, a monotype class very popular in the United States, based on the Schweizer SGS 1-26 glider and managed by the 1-26 Association, a division of the Soaring Society of America.

== History ==
=== Open Class ===
The Open Class is the oldest competition class, although it only came into formal existence with the creation of the two-seater class in the early 1950s.

This unrestricted class has been a favourite testing ground for technological innovation. Many research prototypes fall under this class definition, e.g. the Akaflieg Darmstadt D-30 of 1938, which had variable-dihedral wings and spars built of light alloys, the extremely large-span SB-10 of 1972, the telescoping-wing Akaflieg Stuttgart FS-29 of 1975 and the solar-powered Icare.

In contests, the Open Class usually delivers the top performances, with daily tasks as far as 1000 km being possible in favourable weather. To be successful, however, an Open Class glider must blend high performance with practicality. "Extreme" designs tend to be failures, of which the Austria of 1931, the Sigma of 1971 and the BJ series are but the most conspicuous examples. Arguably the only (Note: The 2010 win of EB29 may be considered another, with EB29's wingspan 29.3 m and aspect ratio of 51.1 close to the record) 'extreme' glider that ever won a World Championships was the Nimbus I.

Until the 1960s, a fair number of gliders were able to do well in open competition, with smaller-span types occasionally beating larger but more cumbersome types. The composite revolution caused a shake-down, further aggravated when the ASW 22 and Nimbus-3 were introduced in 1981, after which the Open Class for a while became the exclusive preserve of only two manufacturers. (Note: Alexander Schleicher GmbH & Co and Schempp-Hirth, until 2010 when Binder Motorenbau's (third manufacturer) EB29 and EB28 took 1st and 3rd place respectively) The World Gliding Championships of 2012 brought into competition new designs, some of significantly lower wingspan, (Note: Jonker JS-1 Revelation - 21 m modification of 18m version, Schempp-Hirth Quintus, Lange Antares 23E) which flew successfully (Note: Schleicher ASH 31 was an earlier (2009) 21 m Open Class design, but had seen no major Open Class competition success) against "traditional" (wingspan 28 m+) machines of this class.

Following a couple of decades of small, incremental performance gains, the appearance in 2000 of the eta brought a sudden jump in performance and a further price escalation. This very expensive aircraft has up to now not had outstanding success in competition, (Note: 2nd place in 2003 WGC in Leszno being the highest WGC place) but it for a while seemed to impact the cost of remaining competitive in the class. The 'eta biter' (Note: A highly modified ASW 22 first seen at the 2006 World Gliding Championships.) and its successor, the Concordia (Note: Concordia took 7th place in 2012 WGC, but it was too early after its introduction to judge its competitiveness) single-seater, as well as Walter Binder's EB28/EB29 until 2012 were being presented as challengers to eta, (Note: I.e. breaking some performance and/or specification records of Eta ("extreme design") while being successful in competition) but the appearance and performance (Note: 1st and 3rd place for 23 m and 21 m designs respectively, with 2nd taken by an "extreme" 29.3 design.) of shorter wingspan competitors in World Gliding Championships of 2012 may change established views on the design trends.

In July 2007, the IGC increased the maximum weight allowed in the Open Class to 850 kg provided the aircraft has a valid certificate of airworthiness at that weight, i.e. the manufacturers must re-certify the glider.

=== Standard Class ===
The Standard Class was introduced in the late fifties as an alternative to the increasingly heavy, difficult to fly and costly Open Class ships of that time. Striving for affordability and simplicity, the original standard class rules restricted the span to 15 metres and ruled out retractable undercarriages, flight-disposable ballast, radios and lift-enhancing devices such as flaps. The archetypal embodiment of these rules is the Ka 6.

Technological change was fast-paced in the years following the introduction of the Standard Class. The transition to fibreglass construction made the existing rules increasingly awkward. The stronger composite structures allowed higher wing loadings, and competitors resorted to fixed ballast to exploit this competitive advantage, which of course increased landing speeds and the risk of damage when alighting in unprepared fields. The fixed undercarriages caused a major fraction of the drag of sleek fibreglass airframes. Designers reacted by recessing the wheels into the fuselage, which further increased the risk of ground-related damage. Manufacturers took to arguing that the single cheapest way to increase performance was to retract the wheel.

In view of these safety and cost-related arguments, the Standard Class rules were updated to allow disposable water ballast and retractable undercarriages. Retractable wheels were allowed by 1970 and water ballast by 1972. Manufacturers were fitting these as production items, and they had to be disabled to fly in competitions.

In 1965 the American Richard Schreder flew a variant of his HP-11, which in normal form had simple flaps as airbrakes. To comply with the rules, the ship was modified for the World Championships so that the outer half of the flaps hinged upwards to comply with the rules. Schreder pointed out that this made the glider more expensive and less safe (higher landing speed, less effective brakes). The argument over whether to allow this went on for the next five years in IGC and eventually the rules were changed to permit plain flaps provided they were the only means of drag control for landing, and there was no aileron linking for camber changing. There were no other limits on using the flaps for lift increase (although the lack of aileron linking meant that the flaps were not as effective as they might have been).

A later concession would bring difficulties in that the demarcation line between airbrake/landing flaps and performance enhancing flaps is vague. The reluctance within the IGC to allow the latter in the Standard Class led to an unsuccessful attempt to codify what constitutes a landing flap. After the LS2 and the PIK-20 exploited this loophole to win the 1974 and 1976 World Championships in the Standard Class, the IGC banned all camber-changing devices from the class and created a parallel 15 metre Class to accommodate them. This decision was problematic as it was the second rule change in a few years and it orphaned several glider types that did not fit well within either class definition (especially the PIK-20 and the Libelle that had been built in large numbers). Notwithstanding, the decision was vindicated by the great success subsequently enjoyed by both the Standard and 15 metre classes.

Some significant Standard Class types have been the Ka 6 and Mucha (1958), the LS1 (1967), the Standard Cirrus (1969), the LS4 (1980) and the Discus (1984). Modern contenders include the Discus 2 (1998), LS8 (1995) and ASW 28 (2000)

=== 15 metre Class ===
This class was created specifically to end the trailing-edge airbrake controversy in the Standard Class. The class has been very successful, being since its inception a feature of all World and European Championships. Technological development has eroded the performance gap that once existed between the Standard and 15-metre classes, which today is perceptible only in strong gliding weather. Some observers argue that the difference is not meaningful enough, that the 18 metre class is the natural successor to the 15 metre class and that the latter should be removed from World Championships to give space to new classes. Notwithstanding, the class has a sizeable following and official support into the foreseeable future.

Significant 15 metre types include the ASW 20 (1977), Ventus (1980), LS6 (1983). Modern contenders include the Ventus-2 (1994), the ASW-27 (1995) and Diana 2 (2005).

=== 18 metre Class ===
The availability of carbon fibre at affordable prices has allowed the manufacture of light and economical spans exceeding 15 metres. Manufacturers started to exploit this potential by offering tip extensions for their flapped sailplanes. Spans increased gradually from 16.6 metres in the first implementations (ASW 20L and Ventus b 16.6) to 17 metres (DG-200/17, DG-600, Glasflügel 403), 17.5 metres (LS6-c), finally settling on 18 metres. The trend towards turbo and self-launching sailplanes also favours the 18 metre span, which is large enough to carry the additional weight of the power unit without impairing the ability to climb in weak lift.

Following a decade of contests at regional level, which permitted the resolution of issues such as mixed glider/motorglider competition, this class came to feature for the first time in a World Championships in 2001, with a maximum all-up weight of 600 kg.

Significant 18 metre types include the Schleicher ASG 29 (2005), Schempp-Hirth Ventus-2 (1995), and the Jonker JS-1 (2007). The same three manufacturers have since introduced new types which are competitive in both the 15 and 18 metre classes with interchangeable wing tips: the AS 33 (2020), the Ventus-3 (2016), and the JS-3 (2017).

=== Two Seater Class ===
A two-seater class appeared for the first time in a World Championships in 1952. The reason for having a separate class was that the drag of the larger fuselage put two-seaters at a significant disadvantage vis-à-vis single seaters. This class was discontinued after the 1956 World Championships, although two-seater World records were retained until 1996.

The IGC voted in 2005 to reinstate a modern Two Seater Class with a span limitation of 20 metres and maximum all-up weight of 800 kg. This class has no relationship to the 'old' two-seater class, as it targets the high performance trainers that have been steadily gaining in popularity. Their smaller size sets them apart from the Open Class two-seaters which are very expensive and require experienced crews. The 20 metre two-seaters handle and fly more like Standard Class single-seaters and cost little more than half the price of an Open Class glider.

Gliders in this class include the Duo Discus (unflapped), Arcus (flapped), ASG 32, and the DG-1000, with the older Janus and DG-500 also being eligible.

=== Club Class ===
Handicapped contests have been a long-standing feature of many regional and national level events. These Club or sports contests allow the use of gliders of widely differing levels of performance. They are thus popular in places where mostly older types are available, or where the number of entrants is not large enough to warrant their separation into the usual classes.

The formal recognition by the FAI of a handicapped class is quite recent, with the first Club Class World Championships having taken place in 2001. It is intended by the FAI as an affordable entry-level class. It has been extremely successful, attracting some of the most talented and experienced pilots in addition to the young and impecunious. Among the reasons for this are the long lifespans of gliders that invite their continued use, the relative simplicity of the class rules and the typically more relaxed "atmosphere" of Club Class competitions.

The glider types allowed are not explicitly defined. The criterion for admission is given by an interval of performance handicaps which may be adjusted by the organisers of each event but that is understood to exclude the current state-of-the-art gliders. Water ballast is not permitted.

The class is perceived as being fair in spite of the differences in glider performance. This may become compromised by the trend towards modification/customisation of Club Class gliders in ways that distort the handicapping and are difficult to control by the sporting bodies.

The emergence of the Club Class is a significant factor in the decline of the World Class, as it is equally affordable, yields higher performances and allows a degree of personal choice in equipment that does not exist in the World Class.

=== World Class ===
The International Gliding Commission (IGC/CIVV) which is part of the FAI and an associated body called Organisation Scientifique et Technique du Vol à Voile (OSTIV) announced a competition in 1989 for a low-cost sailplane, which should have moderate performance, be easy to assemble and to handle, and safe for inexperienced pilots to fly. The idea behind the project was to make gliding competitions more affordable and popular. The winning design was announced in 1993 as the Warsaw Polytechnic PW-5, thus becoming the only glider allowed to take part in the competition.

The first World Class World Championship took place in 1997 in Inonu, Turkey, but participation was not as high as has been expected. World Class world championships have ceased after 1 October 2014. This class will be replaced by a 13.5 metre Class in which more types of gliders with disposable ballast will be permitted. First World gliding championship of the 13.5 metre Class took place in August 2015 in Lithuania.

=== Ultralight Class ===
A glider with a take-off mass not exceeding 220 kg is in the DU Ultralight Class. This class has been defined for world records but there is no competition class for these types at present. A further sub-type of this class is called a 'microlift glider'. For these the wing loading does not exceed 18 kg/m^{2}. For records microlift gliders are classed with the other ultralights.
