= FAI World Grand Prix 2008 =

- Type: Gliding
- Founded: 2005
- Country: Chile
- Date: 2–9 January
- Year: 2010
- Season: 3
- Airfield: Vitacura
- Location: Santiago, Chile
- Website: http://www.grandprixchile.org

The third FAI World Grand Prix 2008–2009 was a gliding Grand Prix that took place in 2010 in Santiago, Chile, with qualifying races taking place during the 2008–2009 flying season, worldwide.

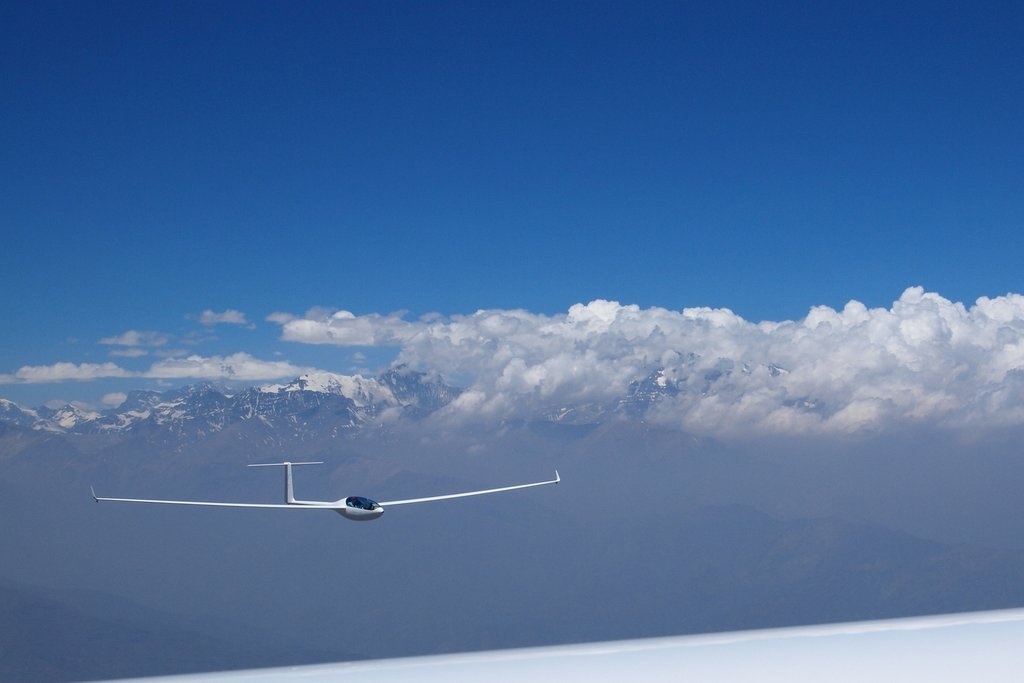
Diana 2 racing glider over the Andes during competition training before World Grand Prix, picture taken from a rival's glider

== Summary ==
=== Overall results ===
Position	Pilot	Country	Glider	Points
1	(Poland) Sebastian Kawa	Poland	(Poland) Diana Sailplanes – Diana 2	69
2	(Chile) Carlos Rocca Vidal	Chile	(Germany) Schempp-Hirth Flugzeugbau GmbH – Ventus-2b	55
3	(Germany) Mario Kiessling	Germany	(Germany) Schempp-Hirth Flugzeugbau GmbH – Ventus-2ax	47
4	(Germany) Uli Schwenk	Germany	(Germany) Schempp-Hirth Flugzeugbau GmbH – Ventus-2ax	40
5	(Italy) Thomas Gostner	Italy	(Poland) Diana Sailplanes – Diana 2	43
6	(Germany) Tilo Holighaus	Germany	(Germany) Schempp-Hirth Flugzeugbau GmbH – Ventus-2ax	24
7	(Austria) Wolfgang Janowitsch	Austria	(Germany) Schempp-Hirth Flugzeugbau GmbH – Ventus-2cxa	15
8	(Chile) Rene Vidal	Chile	(Germany) Schempp-Hirth Flugzeugbau GmbH – Ventus-2c	14
8	(Poland) Stanislaw Wujczak	Poland	(Germany) Alexander Schleicher GmbH & Co – ASG 29	14
10	(Austria) Eduard Supersperger	Austria	(Germany) Schempp-Hirth Flugzeugbau GmbH – Ventus-2b	12
11	(Austria) Heimo Demmerer	Austria	(Germany) Schempp-Hirth Flugzeugbau GmbH – Ventus-2b	11
12	(Germany) Patrick Puskeiler	Germany	(Germany) Schempp-Hirth Flugzeugbau GmbH – Discus-2ax	8
13	(Czech Republic) Petr Krejcirik	Czech Republic	(Germany) Schempp-Hirth Flugzeugbau GmbH – Ventus-2ax	4
13	(Australia) Graham Parker	Australia	(Germany) Alexander Schleicher GmbH & Co – ASG 29	4
15	(Finland) Olli Teronen	Finland	(Germany) Alexander Schleicher GmbH & Co – ASG 29	2

=== Qualifying races ===
Place	Country	Qualifying Grand Prix	Class	Dates
Torino	Italy	Torino Grand Prix	15 meters	15–22 June 2008
Saint-Auban	France	Sailplane Grand Prix of France	15 meters	30 August – 7 September 2008
Lasham	United Kingdom	Soaring Grand Prix of United Kingdom	15 meters	1–7 September 2008
Nitra	Slovakia	Soaring Grand Prix of Slovakia	18 meters	7–13 September 2008
Narromine	Australia	Soaring Grand Prix of Australia	18 meters	30 November – 6 December 2008
Santiago	Chile	Santiago Qualifying Grand Prix	15 meters	17–25 January 2009
Zar	Poland	Qualifying Grand Prix of Poland	club	22 April – 3 May 2009
Feldkirchen	Austria	Austrian Soaring Grand Prix	15 meters	16–23 May 2009

=== Final ===
The list of participating pilots:

FAI ranking	Pilot	Country	Qualifying Grand Prix
2	(Poland) Sebastian Kawa	Poland	FAI World Sailplane GP Champion 2007
14	(Germany) Mario Kiessling	Germany	Grand Prix de France
20	(Austria) Wolfgang Janowitsch	Austria	Austrian Soaring Grand Prix
24	(Czech Republic) Petr Krejcirik	Czech Republic	Soaring Grand Prix of Slovakia
36	(Germany) Uli Schwenk	Germany	Santiago Qualifying Grand Prix
39	(Australia) Graham Parker	Australia	Soaring Grand Prix of Australia
60	(Italy) Thomas Gostner	Italy	Santiago Qualifying Grand Prix
61	(Poland) Stanislaw Wujczak	Poland	Qualifying Grand Prix of Poland
116	(Chile) Carlos Rocca Vidal	Chile	Santiago Qualifying Grand Prix
204	(Germany) Tilo Holighaus	Germany	Santiago Qualifying Grand Prix
247	(Austria) Heimo Demmerer	Austria	Austrian Soaring Grand Prix
261	(Chile) Rene Vidal	Chile	Santiago Qualifying Grand Prix
302	(Austria) Eduard Supersperger	Austria	Austrian Soaring Grand Prix
341	(Germany) Patrick Puskeiler	Germany	Qualifying Grand Prix of Poland
410	(Finland) Olli Teronen	Finland	Soaring Grand Prix of Slovakia

=== Race 1 – 2.01.2010 ===
Position	Pilot	Glider	Speed	Distance	Points	Penalties
1	(Germany) Mario Kiessling	Ventus-2ax	160.6 km/h	319.7 km	10	
2	(Chile) Carlos Rocca Vidal	Ventus-2b	153.4 km/h	319.7 km	8	
3	(Poland) Sebastian Kawa	Diana 2	153.2 km/h	319.7 km	7	
4	(Poland) Stanislaw Wujczak	ASG 29	152.5 km/h	319.7 km	6	
5	(Italy) Thomas Gostner	Diana 2	147.9 km/h	319.7 km	5	
6	(Germany) Uli Schwenk	Ventus-2ax	147.6 km/h	319.7 km	4	
7	(Czech Republic) Petr Krejcirik	Ventus-2ax	147.3 km/h	319.7 km	3	
8	(Germany) Patrick Puskeiler	Discus 2ax	147.0 km/h	319.7 km	2	
9	(Austria) Eduard Supersperger	Ventus-2b	146.1 km/h	319.7 km	1	Penalty 10 sec (Finish Line Altitude 784 m)
10	(Germany) Tilo Holighaus	Ventus-2ax	144.2 km/h	319.7 km		Penalty 105 sec (Finish Line Altitude 765 m)
10	(Austria) Heimo Demmerer	Ventus-2b	143.6 km/h	319.7 km		Penalty 125 sec (761m Before Finish Line)
10	(Austria) Wolfgang Janowitsch	Ventus-2cax	143.5 km/h	319.7 km		
10	(Chile) Rene Vidal	Ventus-2c	142.7 km/h	319.7 km		Penalty 190 sec (Finish Line Altitude 748 m)
10	(Finland) Olli Teronen	ASG 29	142.1 km/h	319.7 km		Penalty 165 sec (Finish Line Altitude 753 m)
10	(Australia) Graham Parker	ASG 29	141.2 km/h	319.7 km		

=== Race 2 – 3.01.2010 ===
Position	Pilot	Glider	Speed	Distance	Points	Penalties
1	(Poland) Sebastian Kawa	Diana 2	93.6 km/h	324.1 km	10	
2	(Germany) Uli Schwenk	Ventus-2ax	90.7 km/h	324.1 km	8	
3	(Germany) Mario Kiessling	Ventus-2ax	89.6 km/h	324.1 km	7	
4	(Chile) Carlos Rocca Vidal	Ventus-2b	85.5 km/h	324.1 km	6	
5	(Italy) Thomas Gostner	Diana 2	85.1 km/h	324.1 km	5	
6	(Germany) Tilo Holighaus	Ventus-2ax	81.3 km/h	324.1 km	4	
7	(Austria) Heimo Demmerer	Ventus-2b	80.8 km/h	324.1 km	3	
8	(Poland) Stanislaw Wujczak	ASG 29	79.0 km/h	324.1 km	2	Penalty 25 sec (Start Altitude 2005) Warning (Right Turn Before Start)
9	(Chile) Rene Vidal	Ventus-2c	78.4 km/h	324.1 km	1	Penalty 140 sec (Finish Line Altitude 772m)
10	(Germany) Patrick Puskeiler	Discus 2ax		272.0 km		
10	(Austria) Wolfgang Janowitsch	Ventus-2cax		271.9 km		
10	(Czech Republic) Petr Krejcirik	Ventus-2ax		203.9 km		
10	(Australia) Graham Parker	ASG 29		195.3 km		Warning (Right turn before start)
10	(Austria) Eduard Supersperger	Ventus-2b		188.5 km		Penalty 93 sec (24 sec to late behind start line + start speed 179 km/h)
10	(Finland) Olli Teronen	ASG 29		172.1 km		

=== Race 3 – 4.01.2010 ===
Position	Pilot	Glider	Speed	Distance	Points	Penalties
1	(Italy) Thomas Gostner	Diana 2	121.2 km/h	217 km	10	
2	(Poland) Sebastian Kawa	Diana 2	121.2 km/h	217 km	8	
3	(Austria) Heimo Demmerer	Ventus-2b	119.1 km/h	217 km	7	
4	(Germany) Mario Kiessling	Ventus-2ax	118.2 km/h	217 km	6	
5	(Chile) Carlos Rocca Vidal	Ventus-2b	115.9 km/h	217 km	5	Warning (right circle before start)
6	(Germany) Uli Schwenk	Ventus-2ax	115.2 km/h	217 km	4	
7	(Chile) Rene Vidal	Ventus-2c	114.4 km/h	217 km	3	
8	(Austria) Wolfgang Janowitsch	Ventus-2cax	113.9 km/h	217 km	2	
9	(Austria) Eduard Supersperger	Ventus-2b	112.6 km/h	217 km	1	
10	(Finland) Olli Teronen	ASG 29	110.7 km/h	217 km		Warning (right circle before start)
10	(Germany) Patrick Puskeiler	Discus 2ax	104.2 km/h	217 km		Penalty 125 sec (finish line altitude 761m)
10	(Germany) Tilo Holighaus	Ventus-2ax	103.2 km/h	217 km		
10	(Poland) Stanislaw Wujczak	ASG 29	101.7 km/h	217 km		
10	(Czech Republic) Petr Krejcirik	Ventus-2ax	99.4 km/h	217 km		
10	(Australia) Graham Parker	ASG 29		35.2 km		

=== Race 4 – 5.01.2010 ===
Position	Pilot	Glider	Speed	Distance	Points	Penalties
1	(Germany) Mario Kiessling	Ventus-2ax	128.8 km/h	240.5 km	10	
2	(Germany) Uli Schwenk	Ventus-2ax	128.1 km/h	240.5 km	8	
3	(Chile) Carlos Rocca Vidal	Ventus-2b	127.6 km/h	240.5 km	7	Penalty 40 sec (finish line altitude 778m)
4	(Poland) Sebastian Kawa	Diana 2	127.1 km/h	240.5 km	6	
5	(Italy) Thomas Gostner	Diana 2	126.3 km/h	240.5 km	5	
6	(Australia) Graham Parker	ASG 29	125.7 km/h	240.5 km	4	Penalty 145 sec (finish line altitude 757m)
7	(Germany) Tilo Holighaus	Ventus-2ax	125.3 km/h	240.5 km	3	Penalty 10 sec (finish line altitude 784m) Warning(Interval between fixes > 10sec)
8	(Austria) Wolfgang Janowitsch	Ventus-2cax	124.2 km/h	240.5 km	2	
9	(Austria) Heimo Demmerer	Ventus-2b	124.1 km/h	240.5 km	1	
10	(Austria) Eduard Supersperger	Ventus-2b	124.0 km/h	240.5 km		
10	(Poland) Stanislaw Wujczak	ASG 29	123.9 km/h	240.5 km		
10	(Czech Republic) Petr Krejcirik	Ventus-2ax	121.4 km/h	240.5 km		
10	(Chile) Rene Vidal	Ventus-2c	117.1 km/h	240.5 km		Penalty 8 (start altitude 2008m)
10	(Germany) Patrick Puskeiler	Discus 2ax	111.1 km/h	240.5 km		
10	(Finland) Olli Teronen	ASG 29	95 km/h	240.5 km		

=== Race 5 – 6.01.2010 ===
Position	Pilot	Glider	Speed	Distance	Points	Penalties
1	(Poland) Sebastian Kawa	Diana 2	128.8 km/h	313.4 km	10	
2	(Italy) Thomas Gostner	Diana 2	128.6 km/h	313.4 km	8	
3	(Chile) Carlos Rocca Vidal	Ventus-2b	128.5 km/h	313.4 km	7	
4	(Germany) Uli Schwenk	Ventus-2ax	127.5 km/h	313.4 km	6	
5	(Austria) Wolfgang Janowitsch	Ventus-2cax	124.5 km/h	313.4 km	5	Penalty 5 sec (start altitude 2205m)
6	(Chile) Rene Vidal	Ventus-2c	124.4 km/h	313.4 km	4	
7	(Poland) Stanislaw Wujczak	ASG 29	124.2 km/h	313.4 km	3	
8	(Germany) Tilo Holighaus	Ventus-2ax	120.4 km/h	313.4 km	2	
9	(Austria) Eduard Supersperger	Ventus-2b	107.2 km/h	313.4 km	1	
10	(Czech Republic) Petr Krejcirik	Ventus-2ax	94.6 km/h	313.4 km		
10	(Australia) Graham Parker	ASG 29	94.2 km/h	313.4 km		Penalty 120 sec (right circling before start, 2nd offence)
10	(Finland) Olli Teronen	ASG 29	91.3 km/h	313.4 km		
10	(Germany) Mario Kiessling	Ventus-2ax		227.6 km		
10	(Germany) Patrick Puskeiler	Discus 2ax		139.4 km		
10	(Austria) Heimo Demmerer	Ventus-2b			Did not fly	

=== Race 6 – 7.01.2010 ===
Position	Pilot	Glider	Speed	Distance	Points	Penalties
1	(Chile) Carlos Rocca Vidal	Ventus-2b	141.2 km/h	329.5 km	10	
2	(Poland) Sebastian Kawa	Diana 2	140.4 km/h	329.5 km	8	
3	(Austria) Eduard Supersperger	Ventus-2b	137.9 km/h	329.5 km	7	Penalty 45 sec (start speed 179 km/h)
4	(Germany) Patrick Puskeiler	Discus 2ax	136.9 km/h	329.5 km	6	
5	(Austria) Wolfgang Janowitsch	Ventus-2cax	133.9 km/h	329.5 km	5	
6	(Germany) Uli Schwenk	Ventus-2ax	131.4 km/h	329.5 km	4	Warning (right circling before start)
7	(Germany) Tilo Holighaus	Ventus-2ax	131.1 km/h	329.5 km	3	
8	(Germany) Mario Kiessling	Ventus-2ax	128.0 km/h	329.5 km	2	
9	(Chile) Rene Vidal	Ventus-2c	127.7 km/h	329.5 km	1	
10	(Italy) Thomas Gostner	Diana 2	125.5 km/h	329.5 km		
10	(Australia) Graham Parker	ASG 29	121.0 km/h	329.5 km		
10	(Poland) Stanislaw Wujczak	ASG 29	119.9 km/h	329.5 km		
10	(Finland) Olli Teronen	ASG 29	116.8 km/h	329.5 km		
10	(Czech Republic) Petr Krejcirik	Ventus-2ax	114.6 km/h	329.5 km		
10	(Austria) Heimo Demmerer	Ventus-2b			Did not fly	

=== Race 7 – 8.01.2010 ===
Position	Pilot	Glider	Speed	Distance	Points	Penalties
1	(Poland) Sebastian Kawa	Diana 2	126.6 km/h	341.4 km	10	
2	(Chile) Carlos Rocca Vidal	Ventus-2b	124.4 km/h	341.4 km	8	
3	(Italy) Thomas Gostner	Diana 2	123.0 km/h	341.4 km	7	Penalty 15 seconds (finish line altitude 783m)
4	(Germany) Uli Schwenk	Ventus-2ax	122.6 km/h	341.4 km	6	
5	(Germany) Tilo Holighaus	Ventus-2ax	120.2 km/h	341.4 km	5	
6	(Germany) Mario Kiessling	Ventus-2ax	120.1 km/h	341.4 km	4	
7	(Poland) Stanislaw Wujczak	ASG 29	119.9 km/h	341.4 km	3	
8	(Austria) Eduard Supersperger	Ventus-2b	119.4 km/h	341.4 km	2	
9	(Austria) Wolfgang Janowitsch	Ventus-2cax	118.9 km/h	341.4 km	1	
10	(Czech Republic) Petr Krejcirik	Ventus-2ax	117.8 km/h	341.4 km		
10	(Australia) Graham Parker	ASG 29	117.3 km/h	341.4 km		
10	(Germany) Patrick Puskeiler	Discus 2ax	116.6 km/h	341.4 km		Penalty 200 seconds (finish line altitude 766m)
10	(Chile) Rene Vidal	Ventus-2c	109.4 km/h	341.4 km		
10	(Finland) Olli Teronen	ASG 29	94.1 km/h	341.4 km		
10	(Austria) Heimo Demmerer	Ventus-2b			Did not fly	

=== Race 8 – 9.01.2010 ===
Position	Pilot	Glider	Speed	Distance	Points	Penalties
1	(Poland) Sebastian Kawa	Diana 2	140.9 km/h	269.7 km	10	
2	(Germany) Mario Kiessling	Ventus-2ax	140.5 km/h	269.7 km	8	
3	(Germany) Tilo Holighaus	Ventus-2ax	139.1 km/h	269.7 km	7	
4	(Germany) Uli Schwenk	Ventus-2ax	139.1 km/h	269.7 km	6	
5	(Chile) Rene Vidal	Ventus-2c	138.3 km/h	269.7 km	5	
6	(Chile) Carlos Rocca Vidal	Ventus-2b	137.9 km/h	269.7 km	4	
7	(Italy) Thomas Gostner	Diana 2	137.5 km/h	269.7 km	3	Penalty 70 seconds (finish line altitude 779m)
8	(Finland) Olli Teronen	ASG 29	137.1 km/h	269.7 km	2	Penalty 20 seconds (finish line altitude 784m)
9	(Czech Republic) Petr Krejcirik	Ventus-2ax	136.8 km/h	269.7 km	1	
10	(Austria) Eduard Supersperger	Ventus-2b	136.7 km/h	269.7 km		
10	(Germany) Patrick Puskeiler	Discus 2ax	132.8 km/h	269.7 km		
10	(Poland) Stanislaw Wujczak	ASG 29	132.1 km/h	269.7 km		
10	(Austria) Wolfgang Janowitsch	Ventus-2cax	128.4 km/h	269.7 km		
10	(Australia) Graham Parker	ASG 29		177.6 km		
10	(Austria) Heimo Demmerer	Ventus-2b			Did not fly	
