= FAI World Grand Prix 2012–2013 =

- Type: Gliding
- Founded: 2005
- Country: France
- Date: 9 May – 16 May
- Year: 2014
- Season: 5
- Airfield: Vaumeilh Aerodrome
- Location: Sisteron

The FAI World Grand Prix 2012–2013 is the fifth gliding Grand Prix. The 7 qualifying races took place during 2012–2013 worldwide flying season. The Finals were held at Vaumeilh near Sisteron, France, between 9–16 May 2014.

== Summary ==
=== Finals result ===
Position	1st	2nd	3rd	4th	5th	6th	7th	8th	9th	10th
Points	10	8	7	6	5	4	3	2	1	0

Position	CN*	Pilot	Glider	Races								Points
Position	CN*	Pilot	Glider	Race 1	Race 2	Race 3	Race 4	Race 5	Race 6	Race 7	Race 8	Points
1	DID	(France) Didier Hauss	Schempp-Hirth Ventus-2cxa	2	1	8	6	6	14	1	1	46
2	RP	(Poland) Sebastian Kawa	SZD 56 Diana 2	1	3	2	9	3	15	8	2	41
3	LX	(Germany) Uli Schwenk	Schempp-Hirth Ventus-2cxa	4	17	5	8	7	4	3	3	36
4	CT	(Italy) Giorgio Galetto	Schempp-Hirth Ventus-2	5	7	7	3	4	12	4	4	34
5	AB	(Australia) Bruce Taylor	Schempp-Hirth Ventus-2cxT	17	18	1	19	1	1	20	7	33
6	GT	(Chile) Rene Vidal	Schempp-Hirth Ventus-2	18	5	3	7	18	3	7	10	23
7	QX	(Czech Republic) Roman Mraček	Schleicher ASG 29E	13	2	15	5	9	5	6	18	21
8	VV	(Germany) Tilo Holighaus	Schempp-Hirth Ventus-2ax	7	11	13	14	8	6	2	11	17
9	BW	(France) Nicolas Veron	Schleicher ASG 29	9	19	19	4	17	2	9	12	16
10	PS	(Australia) Tom Claffey	Schleicher ASW 27	10	9	10	11	2	8	5	14	15
11	57	(United Kingdom) Mike Young	Schleicher ASG 29	19	20	20	2	19	19	13	5	13
12	WR	(Germany) Robert Schroeder	Rolladen-Schneider LS8-a	8	16	4	18	16	18	19	6	12
13	FB	(France) Laurent Aboulin	Schleicher ASG 29	3	8	6	10	10	10	17	16	11
14	XM	(Australia) Graham Parker	Schleicher ASG 29	15	14	17	1	14	17	11	13	10
14	RZ	(New Zealand) John Coutts	Schleicher ASW 27	6	10	11	12	5	11	10	9	10
16	XY	(Lithuania) Gintautas Zube	Schempp-Hirth Ventus-2	20	4	9	20	20	20	14	20	5
17	LY	(Germany) Kai Lindenberg	Schleicher ASG 29	12	12	14	15	12	7	12	17	3
18	KT	(Italy) Thomas Gostner	SZD 56 Diana 2	11	6	12	13	11	13	16	15	2
18	AX	(Czech Republic) Petr Panek	Schempp-Hirth Ventus-2	14	13	16	16	13	16	15	8	2
20	LR	(Chile) Carlos Rocca	Schleicher ASW 27	16	15	18	17	15	9	18	19	1

* – competition number

=== Qualifying races ===
Location	Country	Date	Class	Winner
Brașov	Romania	29 April-6 May 2012	Club	(Czech Republic) Petr Panek
Potchefstroom	South Africa	2–10 November 2012	18 metre	(United Kingdom) Andrew Davis
Lake Keepit	Australia	12–18 December 2012	18 metre	(Australia) Tom Claffey
Santiago	Chile	26 January-2 February 2013	15 metre	(Chile) Carlos Rocca Vidal
Långtora	Sweden	4–11 May 2013	15 metre	(Lithuania) Gintautas Zube
Rennes	France	18–25 May 2013	15 metre	(France) Laurent Aboulin
Żar	Poland	26 July-4 August 2013	18 metre	(Poland) Sebastian Kawa

== See also ==
- Results of Grand Prix series
- World Gliding Championships
- European Gliding Championships
