= Krzysztof Kubryński =

Krzysztof Kubryński (born 1954, Poland) is a researcher in aerodynamics. Author of a set of computer programs (KK-AERO) assisting in the design of the aircraft. His methodology of 3D aerodynamic design and his software had been used in the majority of contemporary competition sailplane projects (ASW-27/ASG-29, Ventus-2, DG-1000, ASW-28, Antares, JS-1, Concordia) . Designer of the sail used by the winner (Mateusz Kusznierewicz) of the 1996 Summer Olympics Finn class competition. Recently he worked on the aerodynamics of the Flaris Jet 1.

Krzysztof Kubryński received his Ph.D. from Faculty of Power and Aeronautical Engineering of Warsaw University of Technology where he had been employed since 1990. His best known design is the wing of Diana 2 (multiple wins at World Gliding Championships and Grand Prix races).

As of 2018, Dr Kubryńki's newest design is the wing of the Diana 3 sailplane, already winning the 2019 European Championships.

== Sources ==
- www.samolotypolskie.pl: Krzysztof Kubryński
