= Pribina Sailplane Grand Prix 2010 =

- Type: Gliding
- Founded: 2005
- Country: Slovakia
- Grand Prix: Pribina Sailplane Grand Prix 2010
- Date: 11–18 September
- Year: 2010
- Season: 4
- Airfield: Nitra
- Location: Nitra
- Races: 4
- Website: http://www.pribinacup.sk/gp2010/
First	(Poland) Christoph Matkowski	ASG 29
Second	(Czech Republic) Iván Novak	Ventus-2C
Third	(Czech Republic) Alena Netusilova, Petr Setka	ASG 29, Ventus-2C

The Pribina Sailplane Grand Prix was the third qualifying Gliding Grand Prix for the FAI World Grand Prix 2010–2011. The competition was flow in with 18 meter class gliders.

== See also ==
- Pribina Sailplane Grand Prix 2008
