= FAI World Grand Prix 2007 =

Auto race

- Type: Gliding
- Founded: 2005
- Country: New Zealand
- Grand Prix: New Zealand
- Date: December 19–24
- Year: 2007
- Season: 2
- Airfield: Omarama
- Location: Omarama, Central Otago, New Zealand
- Races: 5
- Website: http://www.gpgliding.com/

The second FAI World Grand Prix 2007 was a gliding Grand Prix at the Omarama airfield in New Zealand during December 19 - December 24. It was the second Gliding Grand Prix race to take place in New Zealand.

The event was briefly postponed for one day after participant Herbert Weiss, a German school teacher and experienced glider, fatally crashed his glider in the days during the event due to turbulance.

== Summary ==
=== Overall results ===
Position	Pilot	Country	Glider	Points
1	(Poland) Sebastian Kawa	Poland	(Poland) Diana Sailplanes - Diana 2	30
2	(Germany) Uli Schwenk	Germany	(Germany) Schempp-Hirth Flugzeugbau GmbH - Ventus 2ax	25
2	(New Zealand) Ben Flewett	New Zealand	(Germany) Alexander Schleicher GmbH & Co - ASW 27	25
4	(United Kingdom) Steve Jones	United Kingdom	(Germany) Schempp-Hirth Flugzeugbau GmbH - Ventus 2ax	24
5	(Czech Republic) Petr Krejcirik	Czech Republic	(Germany) Schempp-Hirth Flugzeugbau GmbH - Ventus 2ax	17
5	(Germany) Michael Sommer	Germany	(Germany) Alexander Schleicher GmbH & Co - ASG 29	17
7	(Germany) Mario Kiessling	Germany	(Germany) Schempp-Hirth Flugzeugbau GmbH - Ventus 2ax	15
8	(Australia) Bruce Taylor	Australia	(Germany) Alexander Schleicher GmbH & Co - ASW 27	14
8	(Italy) Giorgio Galetto	Italy	(Germany) Schempp-Hirth Flugzeugbau GmbH - Ventus 2ax	14
10	(United Kingdom) Peter Harvey	United Kingdom	(Germany) Alexander Schleicher GmbH & Co - ASW 27	13
11	(South Africa) Mark Holliday	South Africa	(Germany) Alexander Schleicher GmbH & Co - ASW 27	10
12	(France) Christophe Ruch	France	(Germany) Schempp-Hirth Flugzeugbau GmbH - Ventus 2a	9
13	(Germany) Erwin Sommer	Germany	(Germany) Schempp-Hirth Flugzeugbau GmbH - Ventus 2ax	7
14	(Germany) Herbert Weiss	Germany	(Germany) Alexander Schleicher GmbH & Co - ASG 29	4
15	(France) Didier Hauss	France	(Germany) Schempp-Hirth Flugzeugbau GmbH - Ventus 2cxT	3
15	(South Africa) Oscar Goudriaan	South Africa	(Germany) Schempp-Hirth Flugzeugbau GmbH - Ventus	3
17	(Russia) Vladimir Panafutin	Russia	(Germany) Rolladen-Schneider Flugzeugbau GmbH - LS6C	0
17	(United States) Tim McAllister	United States	(Germany) Schempp-Hirth Flugzeugbau GmbH - Ventus C	0

== Classification ==
=== Qualifying ===
FAI ranking	Pilot	Country	Qualifying Grand Prix
1	(Poland) Sebastian Kawa	Poland	Omarama, NZ
4	(Germany) Michael Sommer	Germany	Gawler, Australia
9	(United Kingdom) Peter Harvey	United Kingdom	Gransden lodge, UK
15	(France) Christophe Ruch	France	St. Auban, France
20	(Germany) Herbert Weiss	Germany	Nitra, Slovakia
21	(Germany) Uli Schwenk	Germany	Hahnweide, Germany
23	(Czech Republic) Petr Krejcirik	Czech Republic	Nitra, Slovakia
24	(Italy) Giorgio Galetto	Italy	Omarama, NZ
37	(Germany) Mario Kiessling	Germany	St. Auban, France
38	(United Kingdom) Steve Jones	United Kingdom	Gransden lodge, UK
63	(France) Didier Hauss	France	St. Auban, France
90	(South Africa) Oscar Goudriaan	South Africa	Bloemfontein, South Africa
101	(Australia) Bruce Taylor	Australia	Gawler, Australia
174	(Germany) Erwin Sommer	Germany	Nitra, Slovakia
339	(New Zealand) Ben Flewett	New Zealand	Omarama, NZ
348	(United States) Tim McAllister	United States	Drakino, Russia
631	(South Africa) Mark Holliday	South Africa	Bloemfontein, South Africa
916	(Russia) Vladimir Panafutin	Russia	Drakino, Russia

=== Race 1 - 19.12.2007 ===
Position	Pilot	Glider	Speed	Distance	Points	Penalties
1	(Germany) Uli Schwenk	Ventus 2ax	116.1 km/h	220.9 km	10	
2	(United Kingdom) Steve Jones	Ventus 2ax	116.0 km/h	220.9 km	8	
3	(Czech Republic) Petr Krejcirik	Ventus 2ax	115.7 km/h	220.9 km	7	
4	(New Zealand) Ben Flewett	ASW 27	115.2 km/h	220.9 km	6	
5	(Germany) Mario Kiessling	Ventus 2ax	113.1 km/h	220.9 km	5	Warning: low finish
6	(Australia) Bruce Taylor	ASW 27	112.1 km/h	220.9 km	4	Warning: low finish
7	(South Africa) Mark Holliday	ASW 27	111.9 km/h	220.9 km	3	
8	(South Africa) Oscar Goudriaan	Ventus	111.2 km/h	220.9 km	2	Penalty: start speed too high
9	(Germany) Michael Sommer	ASG 29	110.8 km/h	220.9 km	1	
10	(France) Christophe Ruch	Ventus 2a	110.5 km/h	220.9 km		
11	(France) Didier Hauss	Ventus 2cxT	101.9 km/h	220.9 km		
12	(United Kingdom) Peter Harvey	ASW 27	99.3 km/h	220.9 km		
13	(United States) Tim McAllister	Ventus C	95.6 km/h	220.9 km		
14	(Poland) Sebastian Kawa	Diana 2	95.4 km/h	220.9 km		
15	(Russia) Vladimir Panafutin	LS6C	81.2 km/h	220.9 km		
16	(Italy) Giorgio Galetto	Ventus 2ax	79.8 km/h	220.9 km		
17	(Germany) Herbert Weiss	ASG 29	79.0 km/h	220.9 km		Penalty: start speed too high
18	(Germany) Erwin Sommer	Ventus 2ax		194.8 km		Penalty: start speed too high

=== Race 2 - 20.12.2007 ===
Position	Pilot	Glider	Speed	Distance	Points	Penalties
1	(Poland) Sebastian Kawa	Diana 2	123.4 km/h	282.0 km	10	Warning: Low finish
2	(New Zealand) Ben Flewett	ASW 27	123.3 km/h	282.0 km	8	
3	(United Kingdom) Steve Jones	Ventus 2ax	122.4 km/h	282.0 km	7	
4	(Czech Republic) Petr Krejcirik	Ventus 2ax	121.6 km/h	282.0 km	6	
5	(Germany) Uli Schwenk	Ventus 2ax	121.4 km/h	282.0 km	5	
6	(Germany) Herbert Weiss	ASG 29	120.5 km/h	282.0 km	4	
7	(South Africa) Mark Holliday	ASW 27	120.2 km/h	282.0 km	3	
8	(France) Christophe Ruch	Ventus 2a	119.4 km/h	282.0 km	2	
9	(Italy) Giorgio Galetto	Ventus 2ax	118.9 km/h	282.0 km	1	
10	(Germany) Mario Kiessling	Ventus 2ax	118.8 km/h	282.0 km		
11	(United Kingdom) Peter Harvey	ASW 27	118.6 km/h	282.0 km		
12	(Australia) Bruce Taylor	ASW 27	117.6 km/h	282.0 km		
13	(Russia) Vladimir Panafutin	LS6C	115.7 km/h	282.0 km		Penalty: start speed too high
14	(France) Didier Hauss	Ventus 2cxT	115.4 km/h	282.0 km		Penalty: start speed too high
15	(South Africa) Oscar Goudriaan	Ventus	109.6 km/h	282.0 km		
16	(Germany) Erwin Sommer	Ventus 2ax	96.7 km/h	282.0 km		
17	(United States) Tim McAllister	Ventus C	92.8 km/h	282.0 km		
18	(Germany) Michael Sommer	ASG 29	10.7 km/h	282.0 km		

=== Race 3 - 21.12.2007 ===
Position	Pilot	Glider	Speed	Distance	Points	Penalties
1	(Germany) Mario Kiessling	Ventus 2ax	120.5 km/h	271.7 km	10	
2	(Germany) Michael Sommer	ASG 29	119.7 km/h	271.7 km	8	
3	(Italy) Giorgio Galetto	Ventus 2ax	119.6 km/h	271.7 km	7	
4	(Poland) Sebastian Kawa	Diana 2	119.5 km/h	271.7 km	6	
5	(United Kingdom) Steve Jones	Ventus 2ax	118.5 km/h	271.7 km	5	
6	(New Zealand) Ben Flewett	ASW 27	117.9 km/h	271.7 km	4	
7	(France) Didier Hauss	Ventus 2cxT	117.8 km/h	271.7 km	3	
8	(France) Christophe Ruch	Ventus 2a	115.9 km/h	271.7 km	2	
9	(United Kingdom) Peter Harvey	ASW 27	114.8 km/h	271.7 km	1	
10	(Australia) Bruce Taylor	ASW 27	113.5 km/h	271.7 km		
11	(Germany) Uli Schwenk	Ventus 2ax	113.4 km/h	271.7 km		
12	(United States) Tim McAllister	Ventus C	112.8 km/h	271.7 km		
13	(Germany) Erwin Sommer	Ventus 2ax	100.7 km/h	271.7 km		
14	(Russia) Vladimir Panafutin	LS6C	90.3 km/h	271.7 km		
15	(Czech Republic) Petr Krejcirik	Ventus 2ax	86.3 km/h	271.7 km		
16	(South Africa) Oscar Goudriaan	Ventus	84.0 km/h	271.7 km		
17	(South Africa) Mark Holliday	ASW 27	82.5 km/h	271.7 km		
18	(Germany) Herbert Weiss	ASG 29		103.1 km		

=== Race 4 - 23.12.2007 ===
Position	Pilot	Glider	Speed	Distance	Points	Penalties
1	(Australia) Bruce Taylor	ASW 27	132.7 km/h	236.1 km	10	
2	(Germany) Uli Schwenk	Ventus 2ax	125.3 km/h	236.1 km	8	
3	(New Zealand) Ben Flewett	ASW 27	123.8 km/h	236.1 km	7	
4	(Poland) Sebastian Kawa	Diana 2	123.6 km/h	236.1 km	6	
5	(Germany) Michael Sommer	ASG 29	122.9 km/h	236.1 km	5	
6	(United Kingdom) Steve Jones	Ventus 2ax	121.6 km/h	236.1 km	4	
7	(Czech Republic) Petr Krejcirik	Ventus 2ax	121.2 km/h	236.1 km	3	
8	(United Kingdom) Peter Harvey	ASW 27	120.8 km/h	236.1 km	2	
9	(South Africa) Oscar Goudriaan	Ventus	120.8 km/h	236.1 km	1	
10	(Germany) Mario Kiessling	Ventus 2ax	120.6 km/h	236.1 km		
11	(France) Christophe Ruch	Ventus 2a	118.5 km/h	236.1 km		
12	(Germany) Erwin Sommer	Ventus 2ax	118.0 km/h	236.1 km		
13	(South Africa) Mark Holliday	ASW 27	117.2 km/h	236.1 km		
14	(Italy) Giorgio Galetto	Ventus 2ax	114.3 km/h	236.1 km		
15	(France) Didier Hauss	Ventus 2cxT	114.1 km/h	236.1 km		
16	(Russia) Vladimir Panafutin	LS6C	95.6 km/h	236.1 km		
17	(United States) Tim McAllister	Ventus C	95.6 km/h	236.1 km		
18	(Germany) Herbert Weiss	ASG 29			Did not fly	

=== Race 5 - 24.12.2007 ===
Position	Pilot	Glider	Speed	Distance	Points	Penalties
1	(United Kingdom) Peter Harvey	ASW 27	119.8 km/h	152.3 km	10	
2	(Poland) Sebastian Kawa	Diana 2	117.5 km/h	152.3 km	8	
3	(Germany) Erwin Sommer	Ventus 2ax	117.4 km/h	152.3 km	7	
4	(Italy) Giorgio Galetto	Ventus 2ax	117.2 km/h	152.3 km	6	
5	(France) Christophe Ruch	Ventus 2a	117.0 km/h	152.3 km	5	
6	(South Africa) Mark Holliday	ASW 27	116.9 km/h	152.3 km	4	
7	(Germany) Michael Sommer	ASG 29	115.6 km/h	152.3 km	3	
8	(Germany) Uli Schwenk	Ventus 2ax	115.0 km/h	152.3 km	2	
9	(Czech Republic) Petr Krejcirik	Ventus 2ax	114.3 km/h	152.3 km	1	
10	(United Kingdom) Steve Jones	Ventus 2ax	112.8 km/h	1 52.3 km		
11	(United States) Tim McAllister	Ventus C	111.1 km/h	152.3 km		
12	(New Zealand) Ben Flewett	ASW 27	109.6 km/h	152.3 km		
13	(South Africa) Oscar Goudriaan	Ventus	106.8 km/h	152.3 km		
14	(Germany) Mario Kiessling	Ventus 2ax	104.5 km/h	152.3 km		
15	(France) Didier Hauss	Ventus 2cxT	94.9 km/h	152.3 km		
16	(Australia) Bruce Taylor	ASW 27		127.8 km		
17	(Russia) Vladimir Panafutin	LS6C		110.3 km		
18	(Germany) Herbert Weiss	ASG 29			Did not fly	

== Notes ==
- Weather and track condition:
- Spectator Count:
  - Practice:
  - Race 1:
  - Race 2:
