= Italian Grand Prix Gliding =

- Type: Gliding
- Founded: 2005
- Country: Italy
- Grand Prix: 1st Torino Sailplane Grand Prix 2008
- Date: 15 - 22 June
- Year: 2008
- Season: 3
- Airfield: Turin-Aeritalia Airport
- Location: Turin
- Races: 4
- Website: http://www.voloavelatorino.it/wag/index.html
| First | (Italy) Stefano Ghiorzo | Ventus 2a |
| Second | (Italy) Giancarlo Grinza | ASW 27B |
| Third | (New Zealand) Dane Dickinson | LS 8 |

The Torino Grand Prix was the first qualifying Gliding Grand Prix for the FAI World Grand Prix 2008. It was a demonstration event for the World Air Games Turin 2009.
