= Chile Grand Prix Gliding 2009 =

- Type: Gliding
- Founded: 2005
- Country: Chile
- Grand Prix: Santiago Qualifying Grand Prix
- Date: 17–25 January
- Year: 2009
- Season: 3
- Airfield: Vitacura
- Location: Santiago de Chile
- Races: 6
- Website: http://www.grandprixchile2009.org/
First	(Germany) Uli Schwenk	Ventus 2a
Second	(Germany) Tilo Holighaus	Ventus 2ax
Third	(Italy) Thomas Gostner	Diana 2

The Santiago Qualifying Grand Prix 2009 was the sixth qualifying Gliding Grand Prix for the FAI World Grand Prix 2008.
