= Swiss Soaring Grand Prix 2010 =

- Type: Gliding
- Founded: 2005
- Country: Switzerland
- Grand Prix: Sailplane Grand Prix St. Moritz
- Date: 21–28 August
- Year: 2010
- Airfield: Samedan Airport
- Location: St. Moritz
- Races: 5
- Website: http://www.grandprix-stmoritz.com
First	(Germany) Mario Kiessling	Ventus 2ax
Second	(Germany) Uli Schwenk	Ventus 2ax
Third	(Austria) Eduard Supersperger	Ventus 2

The Sailplane Grand Prix St. Moritz was the second qualifying Gliding Grand Prix for the FAI World Grand Prix 2010-2011.
