= British Grand Prix (disambiguation) =

The British Grand Prix is a Formula One motor race.

British Grand Prix can also refer to:

- British Grand Prix (athletics), a track and field meeting part of the Diamond League series
- British Grand Prix (squash), an annual squash tournament
- British motorcycle Grand Prix, a motorcycle race
- British Grand Prix Gliding, a gliding competition
- Speedway Grand Prix of Great Britain, a speedway event
- A1 Grand Prix of Nations, Great Britain, an A1 Grand Prix motor race

== See also ==
- British Formula One Championship
