= Pribina Sailplane Grand Prix 2008 =

- Type: Gliding
- Founded: 2005
- Country: Slovakia
- Grand Prix: Pribina Sailplane Grand Prix 2008
- Date: 6 - 13 September
- Year: 2008
- Season: 3
- Airfield: Nitra
- Location: Nitra
- Races: 7
- Website: http://www.pribinacup.sk/gp2008/
First	(Czech Republic) Petr Krejcirik	Ventus 2C
Second	(Poland) Sebastian Kawa	ASG 29
Third	(Finland) Olli Teronen	ASG 29E

The Pribina Sailplane Grand Prix 2008 was the fourth qualifying Gliding Grand Prix for the FAI World Grand Prix 2008.
