= Austria Grand Prix Gliding 2009 =

- Type: Gliding
- Founded: 2005
- Country: Austria
- Grand Prix: Austrian Gliding Grand Prix
- Date: 17–24 April
- Year: 2009
- Season: 3
- Airfield: Feldkirchen Airfield
- Location: Feldkirchen
- Races: 6
- Website: https://web.archive.org/web/20090312020744/http://gliding-grandprix.lokf.at:80/
First	(Austria) Wolfgang Janowitsch	Ventus 2cxa
Second	(Austria) Eduard Supersperger	Ventus 2b
Third	(Austria) Heimo Demmerer	Ventus 2

The Austrian Gliding Grand Prix 2009 was the last qualifying Gliding Grand Prix for the FAI World Grand Prix 2009.
