= Romanian Grand Prix Gliding 2011 =

- Type: Gliding
- Founded: 2005
- Country: Romania
- Grand Prix: Sailplane Grand Prix Brașov Romania
- Date: 1–8 May
- Year: 2011
- Season: 4
- Airfield: Ghimbav
- Location: Brașov
- Class: Standard
- Weather: The remarkable weather conditions in spring in combination with a hill / mountain area and the relatively short tasks of GP gliding can offer the outstanding gliding experience.
- Website: sgp2011.aeroclubulromaniei.ro

The Romanian Qualifying Grand Prix 2011 is the first qualifying Gliding Grand Prix for the FAI World Grand Prix 2010–2011 that took place in Romania.
