= Australian Grand Prix Gliding 2010 =

- Type: Gliding
- Founded: 2005
- Country: Australia
- Grand Prix: 2010 Australian Qualifying Grand Prix
- Date: March
- Year: 2011
- Season: 4
- Airfield: Boonah
- Location: Boonah
- Website: http://www.glidinggrandprix2010.com.au/

The 2010 Australian Qualifying Grand Prix was the fourth qualifying Gliding Grand Prix for the FAI World Grand Prix 2010-2011.

== See also ==
- Australian Grand Prix Gliding 2008
