= FAI World Grand Prix 2010–2011 =

- Type: Gliding
- Founded: 2005
- Country: (Germany)
- Date: 23 July – 30 July
- Year: 2011
- Season: 4
- Airfield: Flugplatz Wasserkuppe
- Location: Wasserkuppe
- First: Giorgio Galetto
- Second: Sebastian Nägel
- Third: Peter Hartmann

The FAI World Grand Prix 2010–2011 was the fourth gliding Grand Prix. The 9 qualifying races took place during 2010–2011 worldwide flying season. The qualifying rounds were held all over the world. The Finals were held in Wasserkuppe, Germany from the 23rd to the 30th of July.

Due to scheduling conflicts with the European Gliding Championships held in Nitra, Slovakia, from 17 to 30 July 2011, some pilots were unable to attend the Grand Prix Final. Among others, triple and defending Grand Prix World champion Sebastian Kawa did not attend The Finals, instead he went on to win the European Gliding Championships in the Standard class.

== Summary ==
=== Overall results ===
Position	CN*	Pilot	Glider	Points
1	CT	(Italy) Giorgio Galetto	Schempp-Hirth Ventus-2ax	31
2	77	(Germany) Sebastian Nägel	Schleicher ASW 27	25
3	PC	(Austria) Peter Hartmann	Schempp-Hirth Ventus-2ax	22
4	M6	(Germany) Uli Schwenk	Schleicher ASW 27	20
5	AX	(Czech Republic) Iván Novak	Schempp-Hirth Ventus-2a	19
6	DID	(France) Didier Hauss	Schempp-Hirth Ventus-2cxa	16
7	GT	(Chile) Carlos Rocca	Schempp-Hirth Ventus-2ax	13
8	PS	(Australia) David Jansen	Schleicher ASW 27	12
9	ALB	(Germany) Patrick Puskeiler	Schempp-Hirth Discus 2a	10
9	VV	(Germany) Tilo Holighaus	Schempp-Hirth Ventus-2ax	10
9	CC	(France) Nicolas Veron	Schleicher ASW 27B	10
12	JS	(Finland) Juha Sorri	Schempp-Hirth Discus	9
13	LR	(France) Jean Denis Barrois	Schleicher ASW 27B	7
14	M3	(Austria) Eduard Supersperger	Schempp-Hirth Ventus-2b	6
14	MC	(Poland) Christoph Matkowski	Schleicher ASG 29E	6
16	AJ	(Czech Republic) Alena Netusilova	Schleicher ASG 29E	4
17	WS	(Finland) Aku Jaakola	Schleicher ASG 29	1
18	BG	(Finland) Oli Teronen	Schleicher ASW 27	0
18	KOS	(Poland) Wojciech Kos	Schleicher ASG 29E	0

* – competition number

=== Qualifying races ===
Location	Country	Date	Class	Winner
St. Moritz	Switzerland	21–29 August 2010	15 metre	(Germany) Mario Kiessling
Nitra	Slovakia	11–18 September 2010	18 metre	(Poland) Christoph Matkowski
Santiago	Chile	22–29 January 2011	15 metre	(Germany) Sebastian Nägel
Lake Keepit	Australia	19–25 March 2011	18 metre	(Australia) Bruce Taylor
Brașov	Romania	1–8 May 2011	Standard	(Germany) Tilo Holighaus
Zar	Poland	1–8 May 2011	Club	(Poland) Sebastian Kawa
Saint-Auban	France	1–8 May 2011	15 metre	(France) Nicolas Veron
Nummela	Finland	22–28 May 2011	Standard	(Finland) Aku Jaakkola
Cascina del Pesce	Italy	28 May – 5 June 2011	18 metre	(Italy) Giorgio Galetto

== See also ==
- Results of Grand Prix series
- World Gliding Championships
- European Gliding Championships
