= British Grand Prix Gliding =

A UK qualifying competition for the FAI Sailplane Grand Prix, a world gliding competition, has been held every second year since 2006.

== Details and results ==
UK qualifying rounds, FAI Sailplane Grand Prix
Year	Dates	Venue	First pilot	Plane type	Second pilot	Plane type	Third pilot	Plane type	Reference
2006	September	Cambridge							
2008	1–7 September	Lasham	Chris Curtis	ASW 27B	Gary Stingemore	ASG 29E	Steve Jones	Ventus	
2010									
2012	(no event)								
2014	3 – 10 May	Bicester							
2016	2–9 July	Bicester							
