= Flaris LAR01 =

Polish five-seat, very light jet

LAR01
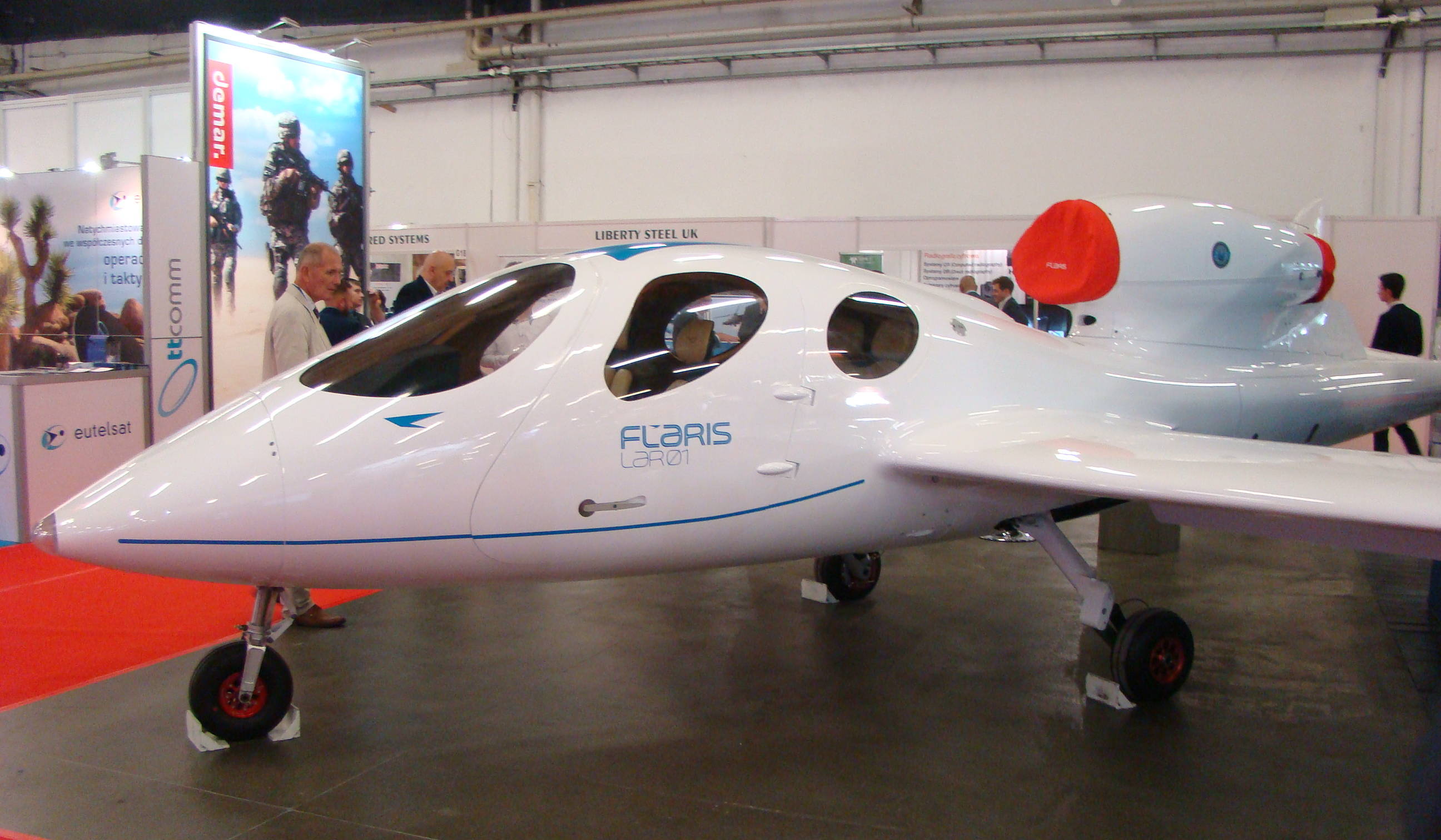

General information
- Type: Very light jet
- National origin: Poland
- Manufacturer: Metal-Master
- Designer: Rafał Ładziński, Andrzej Frydrychewicz
- Status: sales started

History
- First flight: 5 April 2019

Flaris LAR01, also variously called the LAR 1 and LAR-1, is a Polish five-seat very light jet, currently under development by Metal-Master of Jelenia Góra. It is the only single-engined very light jet currently being developed by a non-American aircraft manufacturer.

The programme was publicly unveiled at the 2013 Paris Air Show, and has been promoted to private owner-operators and corporate customers, as well as commercial operators. Originally intended to perform its maiden flight as early as 2013, the prototype first flew on 5 April 2019.

== Development ==
=== Origins ===
The Flaris LAR01 project was started by Sylwia and Rafał Ładzińscy with the assistance of the Instytut Lotnictwa, Instytut Techniczny Wojsk Lotniczych, Politechnika Warszawska, Politechnika Wrocławska and Wojskowa Akademia Techniczna. According to Ładziński, the aircraft had emerged from an ambition to produce an affordable aircraft that would be well-suited to short-haul point-to-point routes and operated by a variety of commercial, corporate, and private owners that sought to progress from operating piston engine and turboprop-powered aircraft. Rafał Ładziński, who had co-originated the aircraft's design with Sylwia Ładziński, serves as the head of the FLARIS project and the chief of Research and Development. The chief designer is Andrzej Frydrychewicz. Significant work on the aircraft's aerodynamics was performed by Krzysztof Kubryński.

In June 2013, the existence of the LAR01 programme was publicly unveiled at the 2013 Paris Air Show. Among the attributes of the aircraft emphasised during its initial announcement were its unique and previously-unserved role in the general aviation market, ease of flight, lightweight construction, low operational cost, safety, and versatility. The company has forecast a demand for the type of hundreds of aircraft per year.

During the 2013 event, at which a prototype of the aircraft was displayed, it was announced that the LAR01 would be the first of three aircraft that manufacturer planned to launch; while few details were stated, it was said that of the two future aircraft, one would be smaller than the LAR01 while the other would be larger. In June 2015, at which point the subject of future family members was discussed in greater detail by the manufacturer, it was revealed that there were future ambitions for a series of business jets to be produced, and that the next design following on from the LAR01 was to adopt a twin-engine configuration.

=== Prototypes and production ===
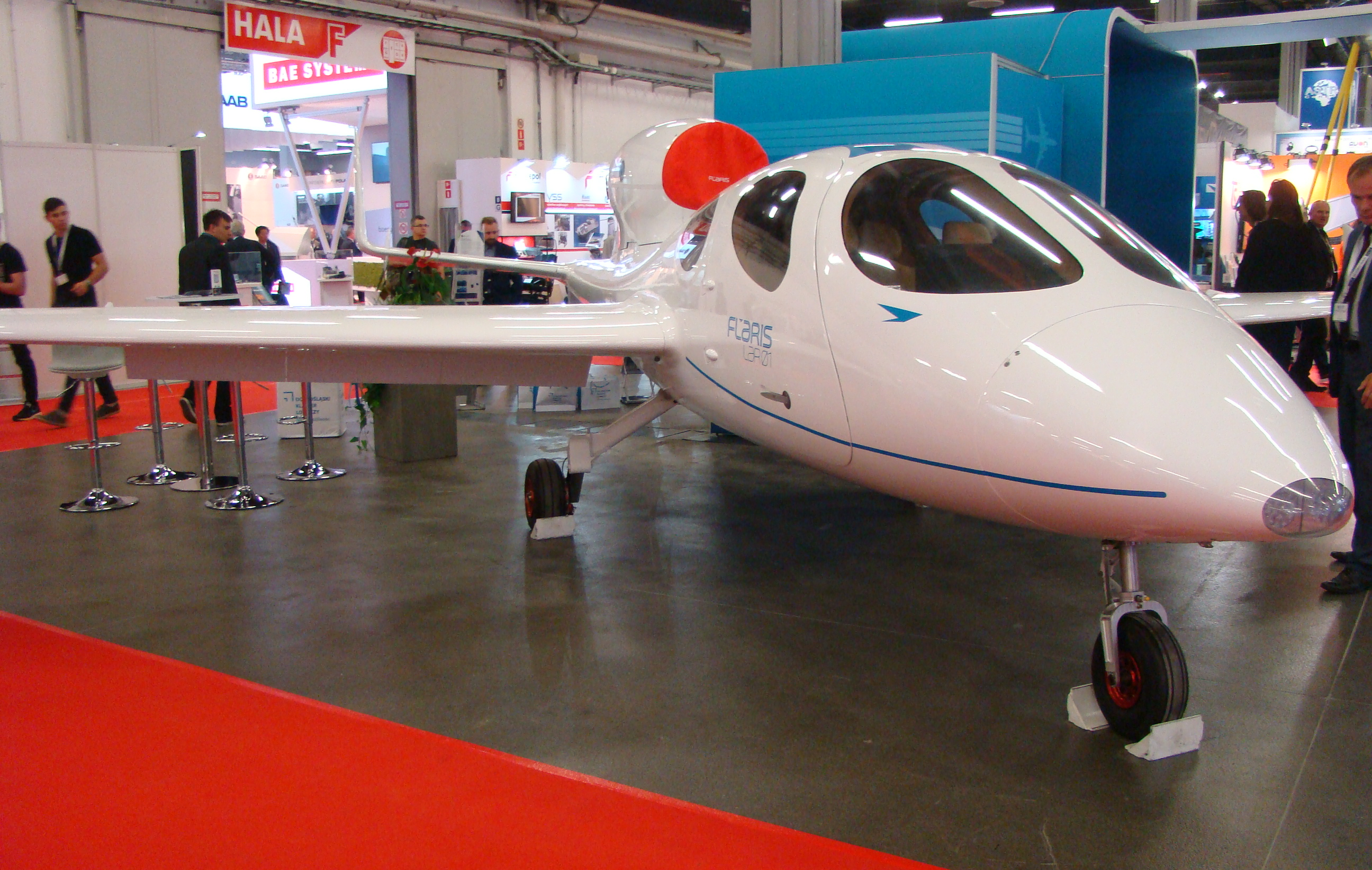
Flaris LAR01

During the 2013 reveal at the Paris airshow, it was stated that an initial prototype of the aircraft would fly later that same year, as well as speculation on the delivery of a batch of 20 aircraft during 2014. During March 2014, the non-flying first prototype was being used for non-destructive load testing, while the second prototype was announced as being intended to perform the type's maiden flight later that year; however, it was acknowledged at the time that there was a lack of certainty over exact dates. The order book is intended to be opened shortly after the maiden flight taking place. By May 2014, the company was already in the process of establishing an assembly line for the type, as well as beginning the construction of the third and fourth prototypes.

The second prototype was powered by a single Pratt & Whitney Canada PW610, although alternative powerplants were already under consideration to power subsequent production aircraft. Aerospace publication Aviation Week has attributed uncertainty over the engine as a reason for delays in the programme. Once in flight, the second prototype would participate in the certification programme, along with a further two prototypes; in December 2014, the manufacturer envisioned the construction of a total of five prototypes. Final CS-23 certification for the LAR01 from the European Aviation Safety Agency (EASA) was anticipated to occur roughly three years following the first flight. In February 2015, the second prototype commenced a series of taxi tests while it reportedly approached the end of ground-based testing.

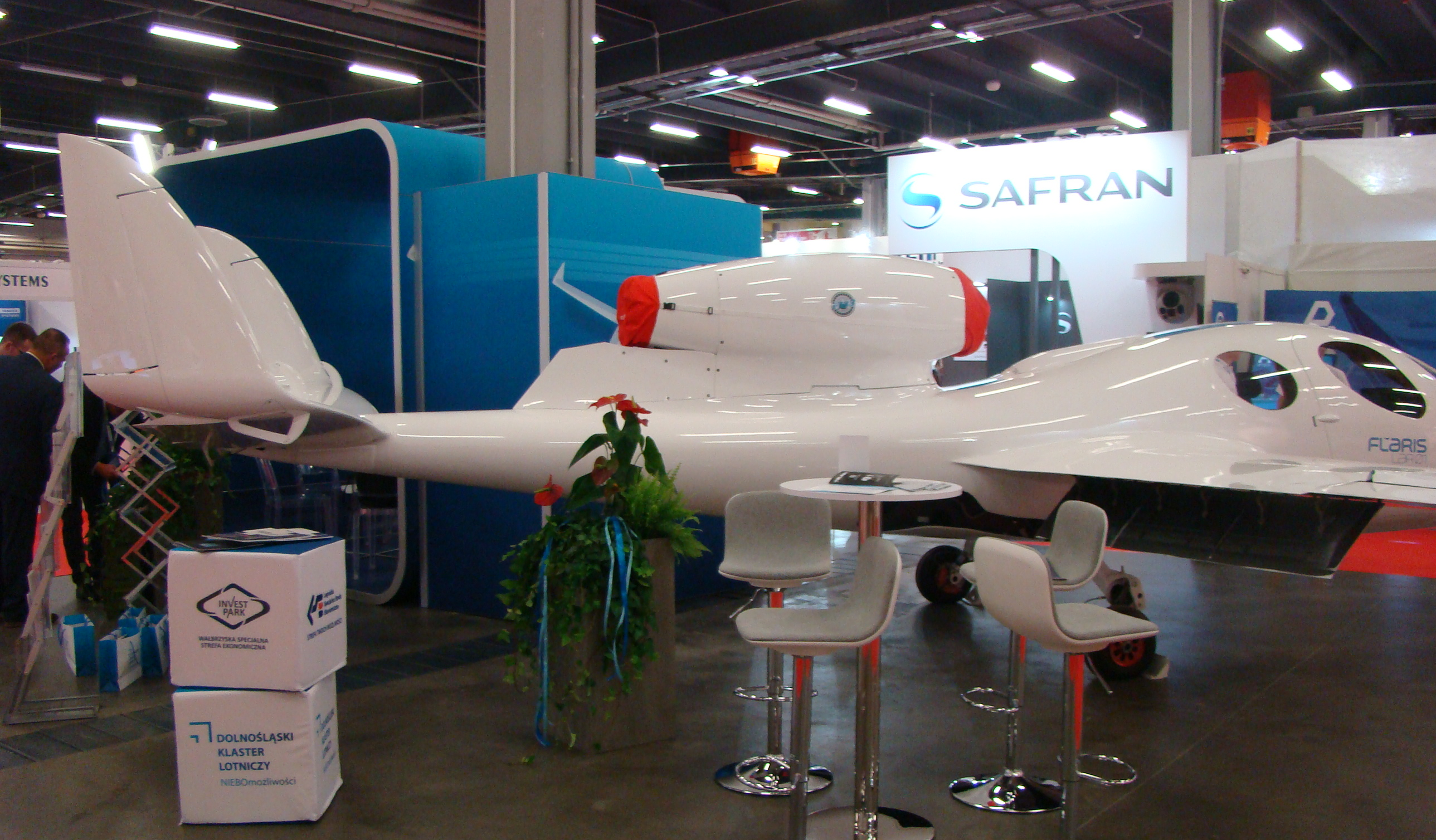
Flaris LAR01

In March 2015, it was stated that the type was expected to receive type certification during 2018. During 2015, it was stated that initial deliveries, then forecast to take place in 2016, would be validated under the Polish civil aviation authority's S-1 experimental aircraft designation, prior to full EASA certification being issued. In February 2016, it was stated that the first flight of the LAR01 was set to take place within the following months. In July 2016, engine ground tests of a LAR-1 equipped with the Williams FJ33-5A, which is to be used in production aircraft, commenced. In February 2017, it was reported that the LAR01 has entered the final stage of ground testing and would perform its first flight within the first half of the year. According to the company, it has been working closely with the Polish civil aviation authority on tests of the onboard systems, including the final tests of the aircraft's detachable wing and cabin pressurisation system.

In June 2018, ground testing was completed before a maiden flight that was anticipated at that time for July 2018. The first 50–100 hours of flight testing was forecast to be carried out at the Zielona Góra Airport in western Poland before a transfer to Wrocław Airport. At that time the company anticipated that the Polish Civil Aviation Authority S-1 experimental certification would be granted after 150 hours of flight testing, all completed within 12 months, before 10 local deliveries, and before full EASA CS-23 type certification, which would follow within 18 and 24 months. Customer orders were expected to be accepted starting in 2019. The aircraft is intended to be exhibited in May 2019 at EBACE in Geneva and in July 2019 at EAA AirVenture Oshkosh.

In September 2018 the first flight had still not occurred and the company website stated, "The maiden flight depends on many factors, such as the weather, and it is difficult to set the exact date. We plan to hold a public demonstration flight only after completing the first test flights."

The prototype, registered SP-YLE, first flew on 5 April 2019 from Zielona Gora Babimost Airport. By February 2020, the initial prototype had logged 60 hours and the production-conforming test aircraft was prepared for a maiden flight in early April. The company had received 50 orders, mostly from owner-flyers. Polish S-1 experimental certification was expected in the fourth quarter, after 200 hours of flight testing, with delivery of the first aircraft forecast for 2021, before applying for EASA CS-23 certification sometime after that. The flight testing program was planned to include system tests on the Williams FJ33 engine, the retractable landing gear, hydraulics, the Garmin G600TXi flightdeck, autopilot and autothrottle. The prototype reached 25,000 ft in under three minutes and 30 seconds, and demonstrated a stall speed of 58 knots (107 km/h).

The production and sales of the aircraft started in April 2024 with first deliveries to the United Arab Emirates. At the same time the company is working on the LAR1 OPV patrol aircraft and the LAR1 CARGO aircraft for the European market.

== Design ==
The Flaris LAR01 is a Polish five-seat very light jet, intended for general aviation use. It is made largely of carbon fiber reinforced polymers and powered by a single turbofan engine – the production version of the LAR01 is to be powered by a single Williams FJ33-5A engine. The LAR01 is intended to be affordable and accessible to individual private owners. Proposed uses for it include air taxi operations, personal transport, emergency medical services and aerial surveillance, as well as its potential modification into an unmanned aerial vehicle (UAV).

The LAR01 has been optimised for use by private pilots. Where possible, the cockpit is deliberately designed to mimic that of a traditional car. The designers intend to provide removable elliptical wings for the aircraft; this measure is to enable the type to be readily parked within typical garages; sections of the tailplane can be similarly detached for the same purpose. Fuel is housed within a tank mounted on the fuselage, deliberately avoiding the use of the wings for fuel storage. The LAR01 is also reported as being relatively easy to control.

Various features for safety and convenience are to be incorporated into the LAR01's design. Unlike many jet-powered aircraft, it is claimed to be readily capable of being operable from unpaved runways and grass strips. For safety purposes, the LAR01 has been designed to use a ballistic rescue parachute system, one parachute being installed within the tail and the other within the nose, which is intended to assist in the safe recovery of the aircraft. It can be equipped with various models of Garmin glass cockpits. An electric de-icing system is also fitted.

The €1.8 million ($2 million) aircraft is forecast to have direct operating costs (fuel, maintenance and insurance) of $450 per hour and have a Garmin G600 TXi flight deck. It should cruise at 430 kn (796 km/h), have a range of 1,900 nmi (3,519 km) with a MTOW of 1,500 kg (3,300 lb), and will be able to take off and land on grass airstrips and short runways of less than 250 m (820 ft).

== Specifications (projected) ==
Data from Company

General characteristics

- Crew: one
- Capacity: four passengers
- Length: 8.32 m (27 ft 4 in)
- Wingspan: 8.68 m (28 ft 6 in)
- Height: 2.43 m (8 ft 0 in)
- Wing area: 10.0 m^{2} (108 sq ft)
- Empty weight: 900 kg (1,984 lb)
- Gross weight: 1,850 kg (4,079 lb)
- Max takeoff weight: 1,850 kg (4,079 lb)
- Cabin height:122 cm (48 in)
- Powerplant: 1 × Williams FJ33-5A turbofan engine, 8.5 kN (1,900 lbf) thrust

Performance

- Maximum speed: Mach 0.72
- Cruise speed: 800 km/h (500 mph, 430 kn)
- Stall speed: 115 km/h (71 mph, 62 kn)
- Range: 3,500 km (2,200 mi, 1,900 nmi)
- Service ceiling: 9,449 m (31,000 ft)
- Maximum glide ratio: 18:1
- Rate of climb: 30 m/s (5,900 ft/min)
- Wing loading: 150 kg/m^{2} (31 lb/sq ft)

== See also ==
Aircraft of comparable role, configuration, and era

- Cirrus Vision SF50
- Eclipse 400
- Epic Victory

Related lists

- List of very light jets
