= Feldkirchen-Ossiacher See Airport =

Feldkirchen-Ossiacher See Airport Flugplatz Feldkirchen-Ossiacher See
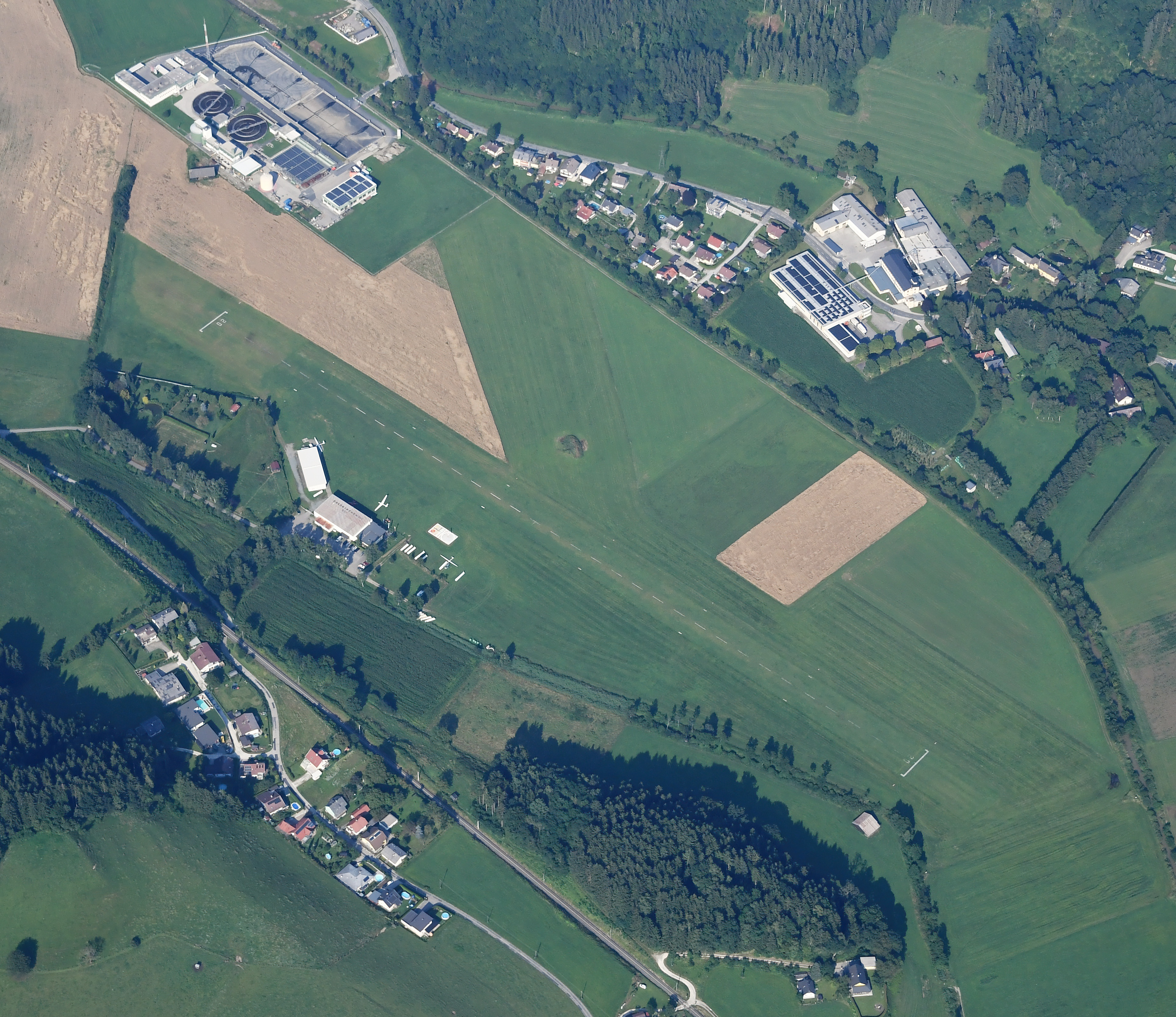
- IATA: none; ICAO: LOKF

Summary
- Airport type: Private
- Serves: Feldkirchen
- Location: Austria
- Elevation AMSL: 1,715 ft / 523 m
- Coordinates: 46°42′29.6″N 014°4′34.4″E

Map
- Location of Feldkirchen-Ossiacher See Airport in Austria

Runways
Direction	Length		Surface
Direction	ft	m	Surface
02/20	2,040	622	Grass
- Source: Landings.com

Feldkirchen-Ossiacher See Airport (German: Flugplatz Feldkirchen-Ossiacher See, ICAO: LOKF) is a private use airport located near Feldkirchen, Kärnten, Austria.

== See also ==
- Austria Grand Prix Gliding
- List of airports in Austria
