= Poland Grand Prix Gliding 2009 =

- Type: Gliding
- Founded: 2005
- Country: Poland
- Grand Prix: Qualifying Grand Prix of Poland
- Date: 22 April - 3 May
- Year: 2009
- Season: 3
- Airfield: Zar
- Location: Bielsko-Biała
- Races: 7
- Website: http://www.sgppolska.pl/
First	(Poland) Sebastian Kawa	Jantar Standard 3
Second	(Germany) Patrick Puskeiler	Ls 1f
Third	(Poland) Stanisław Wujczak	SZD 59

The Qualifying Grand Prix of Poland was the seventh qualifying Gliding Grand Prix for the FAI World Grand Prix 2009. Because the usage of handicaps is not allowed in the Grand Prix style of competitions, only the planes with handicap index 101 from Club class were allowed. This gliders are: ASW19, B; Cirrus CS 11-75 L; Cirrus G(w); Cirrus; Cirrus B(w); DG 100; Hornet (w); Jantar std 2 i 3; Brawo; Ls 1f, 45; Std Libelle 17m; SZD 59.
