= Australian Grand Prix Gliding 2008 =

- Type: Gliding
- Founded: 2005
- Country: Australia
- Grand Prix: Australian Qualifying Gliding Grand Prix
- Date: 30 November – 6 December 2008
- Year: 2008
- Season: 3
- Airfield: Narromine
- Location: Narromine
- Races: 7
- Website: Official webpage
First	(Australia) Graham Parker	ASG 29E
Second	(Italy) Riccardo Brigliadori	ASG 29E
Third	(Australia) John Buchanan	ASG 29

The FAI Australian Grand Prix 2008 was the fifth qualifying Gliding Grand Prix for the FAI World Grand Prix 2008.
