= Diana Sailplanes Diana =

Polish single-seat glider, 1990

SZD 56 Diana
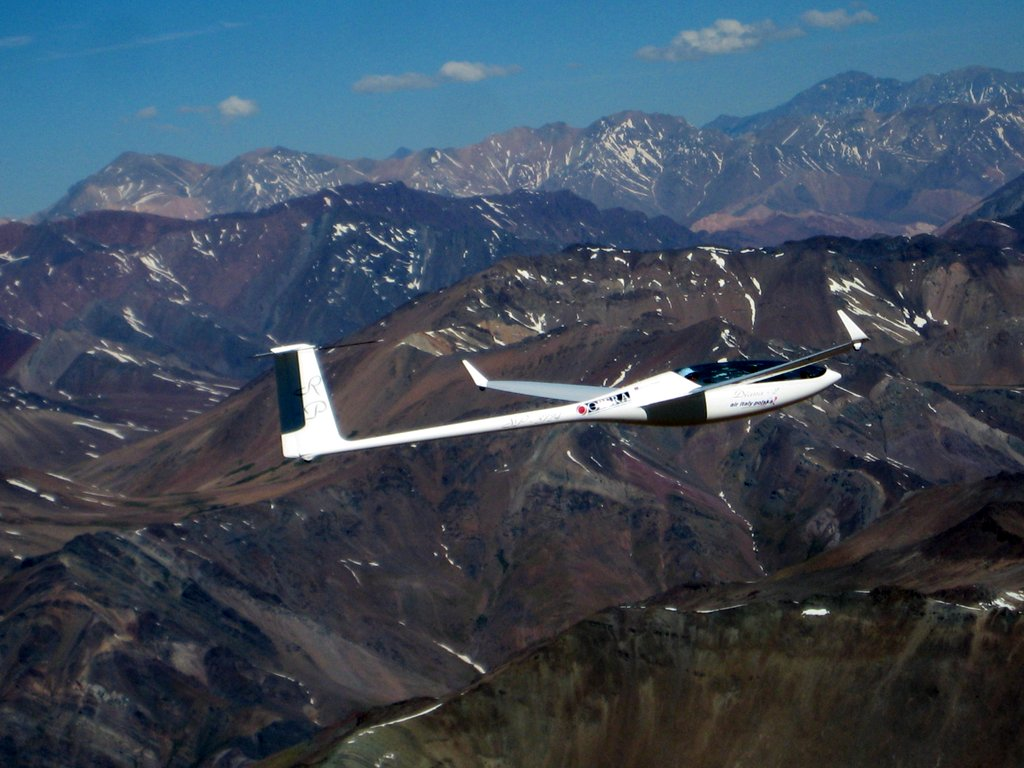
- SZD 56-2 Diana 2, training before World Grand Prix, Andes

General information
- Type: 15 Meter-class sailplane
- National origin: Poland
- Manufacturer: Avionic, Górki Wielkie, POLAND. Previously manufactured by : PZL-Bielsko, Design Office B Bogumił Bereś
- Designer: Bogumił Bereś, Krzysztof Kubrynski

History
- First flight: 29 November 1990 (Diana), 12 January 2005 (Diana 2)

The SZD-56 Diana is a 15 metre Class glider originally designed by Bogumił Bereś at PZL-Bielsko. However, PZL Bielsko went bankrupt before it could be put into serial production.

The rights to the design were taken over by a new entity, Diana Sailplanes, which developed the design further into the Diana 2. The Diana 2 first flew on 12 January 2005.

After two years of development, in 2018 a new design using a fuselage from Czech manufacturer KKB and a wing from Diana Sailplanes was introduced for the 18 metre Class called the Diana 3.

== Design and development ==
The Diana is a single-seat 15-metre class sailplane. It uses a mid-wing cantilever monoplane with a T-tail unit. It has an all composite carbon-aramid-epoxy structure. The spar-less wing has plate airbrakes protruding from the upper surface only with full-span flaperons. The Diana has a retractable main landing gear with a fixed tail wheel.

The wing was designed by Krzysztof Kubrynski using numerical flow simulation methods (computer programs of his design). It uses a profile belonging to the KL-002 family. For fuselage-wing interference minimization reasons, the wing is thinner at the root. Also, the leading and trailing edges do not follow any straight lines, necessitating a production process that depends heavily on CNC technology. The new wing offers considerably better performance at high speeds and better immunity from surface contamination.

The glider also features an unusual side-stick control system to accommodate the pilot in its unusually narrow cockpit. As the maximum possible water ballast that can be carried in the wings is almost 60 kg (130 lb) heavier than the empty weight of the glider, the Diana 2 has a very large range of wing loadings, from 28 to 58 kg/m^{2} (5.7 to 11.9 lb/ft^{2}).

In October 2016 Diana's IP rights for the design were passed to Polish company AVIONIC, who announces number of changes to increase performance and comfort of the flight, calling the aircraft NG (New Generation). NG includes fixes and improvements for pilot comfort.

== Competition Awards ==
2005 – Janusz Centka wins the silver medal in 13th European Gliding Championships in Rayskala – Finland

2005 – Janusz Centka wins the silver medal in 30th Open Class Polish Nationals in Leszno – Poland

2005 – Sebastian Kawa wins the gold medal in 1st Gliding Races Championships in Saint Auban – France

2006 – Janusz Centka wins the gold medal in 31st Open Class Polish Nationals in Leszno – Poland

2006 – Janusz Centka wins the gold medal in 29th World Gliding Championships in Eskilstuna – Sweden

2007 – Janusz Centka wins the gold medal in 14th European Gliding Championships in Issoudun – France

2007 – Karol Staryszak wins the silver medal in 14th European Gliding Championships in Issoudun – France

2007 – Tomasz Krok wins the silver medal in 1st Polish 15m Class Championship 2007 Leszno – Poland

2007 – Sebastian Kawa wins the gold medal in 1st Polish 15m Class Championship 2007 Leszno – Poland

2007 – Sebastian Kawa wins the gold medal in 2nd FAI World Grand Prix Gliding at Omarama – New Zealand

2008 – Janusz Centka wins the silver medal in 30th World Gliding Championships in Luesse – Germany

2009 – Thomas Gostner wins the gold medal in Chilean National in Santiago – Chile

2009 – Sebastian Kawa wins the gold medal in 3rd World Air Games in Turin – Italy

2009 – Thomas Gostner wins the gold medal in 15 Italian Nationals – Italy

2009 – Stefano Ghiorzo wins the silver medal in 15 Italian Nationals – Italy

2009 – Lukasz Wojcik wins the silver medal in 15th European Gliding Championships in Nitra – Slovakia

2009 – Sebastian Kawa wins the gold medal in Pribina Cup, Nitra – Slovakia

2009 – Lukasz Wojcik wins the silver medal in Pribina Cup, Nitra – Slovakia

2009 – Sebastian Kawa wins the bronze medal in 7th Andes Open Soaring Championship

2009 – Thomas Gostner wins the gold medal in Campeonato Nacional Chileno in Santiago – Chile

2010 – Sebastian Kawa wins the gold medal in 3rd World Sailplane Grand Prix Final in Santiago – Chile

2010 – Thomas Gostner wins the bronze medal in 3rd World Sailplane Grand Prix Final in Santiago – Chile

2012 – Sebastian Kawa wins the gold medal in 32nd World Gliding Championships in Uvalde – USA

2014 – Sebastian Kawa wins silver medal in 5th World Championship Races Gliding at Sisteron – France

2014 – Sebastian Kawa wins the gold medal in 33rd World Gliding Championships in Leszno – Poland

2016 – Jerzy Zieba wins the silver medal in FAI Sailplane Grand Prix USA in Ionia – USA

2017 – Lukasz Grabowski wins the bronze medal in 34th FAI World Gliding Championships in Benalla – Australia

2017 – Sebastian Kawa wins the gold medal in 34th FAI World Gliding Championships in Benalla – Australia

2017 – Lukasz Grabowski wins the gold medal in 7th Polish 15m Class Championships in Kielce – Poland

2018 – Lukasz Grabowski wins the gold medal in Ostrów Glide, Polish Nationals 15m – Poland

2023 - Sebastian Kawa wins the gold medal in 15 metre 37 World championships, Narromine - Australia

== Variants ==
SZD-56-1 Diana 1
Certified in Poland in 1997 originally, two built by PZL-Bielsko up to 1998, three built by Bogumil Beres from 2001.
SZD-56-2 Diana 2
Production variant built by Bogumil Beres and had a certification by EASA awarded in 2015.
SZD-56-2 Diana 2 NG (New Generation) (15-metre class)
Production variant built since 2017 after production rights were passed to Polish Company Avionic.
SZD-56-2 Diana 2 NG – FES (15-metre class)
Production variant built since 2018 by Avionic with a front-end electric sustaining (FES) engine.
Diana 3 KKB 18KE – FES (18-metre class)
Production variant built since 2018 by Avionic with a front-end electric sustaining (FES) engine.

== Specifications (Diana 2) ==
Data from

General characteristics

- Crew: One
- Capacity: 240 kg (63.4 US gal / 529 lb) of water ballast
- Length: 6.88 m (22 ft 5 in)
- Wingspan: 15.00 m (49 ft 2 in)
- Height: 1.35 m (7 ft 7 in)
- Wing area: 8.16 m^{2} (88 sq ft)
- Aspect ratio: 27.57
- Empty weight: 182 kg (401 lb)
- Gross weight: 500 kg (1,100 lb)

Performance

- Maximum speed: 270 km/h (170 mph, 150 kn)
- Stall speed: 60 km/h (37.2 mph, 32.3 kn)
- Maximum glide ratio: 50
- Rate of sink: 0.45 m/s (89 ft/min)

== See also ==
Aircraft of comparable role, configuration, and era

- Rolladen-Schneider LS10
- Schempp-Hirth Ventus-2
- Schleicher ASW 27
- Schleicher ASG 29

Related lists

- List of gliders
