= A1 Grand Prix of Nations, Great Britain =

A1 Grand Prix of Nations, Great Britain may refer to:

- 2005–06 A1 Grand Prix of Nations, Great Britain
- 2006–07 A1 Grand Prix of Nations, Great Britain
- 2007–08 A1 Grand Prix of Nations, Great Britain
- 2008–09 A1 Grand Prix of Nations, Great Britain
