= Grand Prix gliding =

Spectacular gliding competitions promoted by FAI

FAI Sailplane Grand Prix
- Current season, competition or edition: FAI Sailplane Grand Prix Series 12
- Sport: Gliding
- Founded: 2005
- Continent: International (FAI)
- Most recent champion: (France) Maximilian Seis
- Most titles: (Poland) Sebastian Kawa (5)
- Website: https://www.sgp.aero/

FAI Sailplane Grand Prix (SGP) are gliding competitions promoted by the Fédération Aéronautique Internationale (FAI), designed to be both more spectacular and more accessible to the public than conventional gliding contests.

== History ==
The FAI Sailplane Grand Prix (SGP) began as two experimental events—first held in Gawler, Australia in January 2001, followed by Saint-Auban, France in June 2003. These early trials laid the groundwork for the format later adopted by the Fédération Aéronautique Internationale (FAI) and its International Gliding Commission (IGC).

The first official SGP World Final was held at Saint-Auban in September 2005. This groundbreaking event featured simultaneous starts, a classic Grand Prix format, and real-time GPS tracking—marking the birth of a new, spectator-friendly approach to glider racing.

In August 2025, on the occasion of the 20th anniversary, a retrospective titled Celebrating 20 Years of SGP: Back to Where It Began highlighted the bravery of the original organizers, the unpredictable weather of the inaugural event, and its resounding success despite a late summer deluge. Remarkably, five valid race days were completed, delivering close, tactical competition even under unsettled skies. The scoring systems used then were fine-tuned in later years based on pilot feedback.

That first Grand Prix Final also brought the format into the public eye. Over the final weekend, Saint-Auban hosted exhibitions and an air show that attracted nearly 1,000 on-site visitors, while the competition website logged over 23,000 visits—astounding numbers for 2005. Poland’s Sebastian Kawa claimed the title as the first-ever SGP World Champion, with Germany’s Mario Kießling and Czech Republic’s Petr Krejčiřík completing the podium.

Over the next few years, the SGP format gained global traction:

- In 2007, the 2nd World Final took place in Omarama, New Zealand.
- In 2010, Santiago, Chile, hosted the 3rd edition.

These early international finals helped the SGP evolve into a worldwide series.

Technological innovation became a hallmark of the competition. The SGP embraced real-time GPS tracking, live video streaming, and advanced spectator engagement tools that helped make gliding more dynamic and accessible than ever before.

In August 2025, another milestone occurred on the 20th Anniversary: for the first time, the SGP World Final was livestreamed in China. This initiative not only delivered real-time race commentary and educational content in Chinese, but also introduced strategic analysis tailored to a new audience. The broadcasts aired daily from 7:00 PM to 9:30 PM Beijing time, bringing the excitement of Sailplane Grand Prix racing to millions of Chinese viewers.

=== Summary of key milestones ===
Year	Milestone
2001	Experimental event in Gawler, Australia
2003	Experimental event in Saint-Auban, France
2005	First official SGP World Final, Saint-Auban – Sebastian Kawa wins the inaugural title
2007	Second Final held in Omarama, New Zealand
2010	Third Final held in Santiago, Chile
2005–present	Ongoing technological evolution: GPS, livestreams, fan engagement tools
2025	20th anniversary celebrated; first livestream in China expands global reach

== Format and racing Style ==
Races take place over a closed course of approximately 200–300 km, generally lasting around 2 hours, with up to 20 gliders racing simultaneously. Competitions are usually staged over 7 days, adapting each day's course to local weather conditions. All gliders start together on a 5 km start line, enabling a competitive spectacle akin to yacht racing; the first to cross the finish line wins. Success hinges on route selection and effective exploitation of thermal currents — turning altitude into speed — demanding both strategy and piloting finesse. Points are awarded daily to the top nine pilots; the pilot accumulating the most points over the event is crowned the winner.

== Recent and upcoming series ==
The 12th SGP Series culminated in the World Final at Saint-Auban, France, in August 2025. The races featured thrilling competition and active fan engagement, including livestreams, onboard footage, and commentary.

In March 2025, the bidding opened for organizers of qualifying events for Series 13, covering the period from November 2025 through May 2027; the World Final is scheduled for January 2028 at Club de Planeadores de Vitacura, Chile — offering exceptional soaring conditions near the Andes.

== Hall of Fame highlights ==
Prominent World Champions include: Sebastian Kawa: Five time World Champion in 2005, 2007, 2010, 2018 and 2021. Maximilian Seis: youngest World Champion in history in 2015 in Varese (Italy) and Serie 12 World Champion. Didier Hauss, Giorgio Galetto, Holger Karow, Tilo Holighaus, Stefan Langer: each have secured a World Title in the series.

== World Grand Prix Gliding Championships Podium ==
Season	Location	Winner	Runner-up	Third place
2005	Château-Arnoux-Saint-Auban	Sebastian Kawa	Mario Kiessling	Petr Krejčiřík
2006–2007	Omarama (NZ)	Sebastian Kawa	Uli Schwenk	Ben Flewett
2008–2009	Santiago (Chile)	Sebastian Kawa	Carlos Rocca Vidal	Mario Kiessling
2010–2011	Wasserkuppe (Germany)	Giorgio Galetto	Sebastian Nägel	Peter Hartmann
2012–2014	Sisteron (France)	Didier Hauss	Sebastian Kawa	Uli Schwenk
2014–2015	Varese (Italy)	Maximilian Seis	Christope Ruch	Sebastian Kawa
2015–2016	Potchefstroom (South Africa)	Holger Karow	Oscar Goudriaan	Christophe Abadie
2018	Vitacura (Chile)	Sebastian Kawa	Sebastian Nägel	Mario Kiessling
2019	La Cerdanya (Spain)	Tilo Holighaus	Sebastian Kawa	Louis Bouderlique
2021	Château-Arnoux-Saint-Auban	Sebastian Kawa	Mario Kiessling	Maximilian Seis
2022–2023	Pavullo nel Frignano (Italy)	Stefan Langer	Erik Borgmann	Hermann Leucker
2024–2025	Château-Arnoux-Saint-Auban	Maximilian Seis	Christophe Abadie	Kévin Faur

== See also ==
- External link: SGP official site
- World Gliding Championships
- Results of Grand Prix series
- FAI World Grand Prix 2007
- FAI World Grand Prix 2008 (Grand Prix final on 2–9 January 2010, Santiago de Chile)
- FAI World Grand Prix 2010–2011
- FAI World Grand Prix 2012–2013
- European and World Gliding Championships
- First UK Gliding Grand Prix at Cambridge Gliding Centre
