= Sebastian Kawa =

Multiple World Champion Glider Pilot

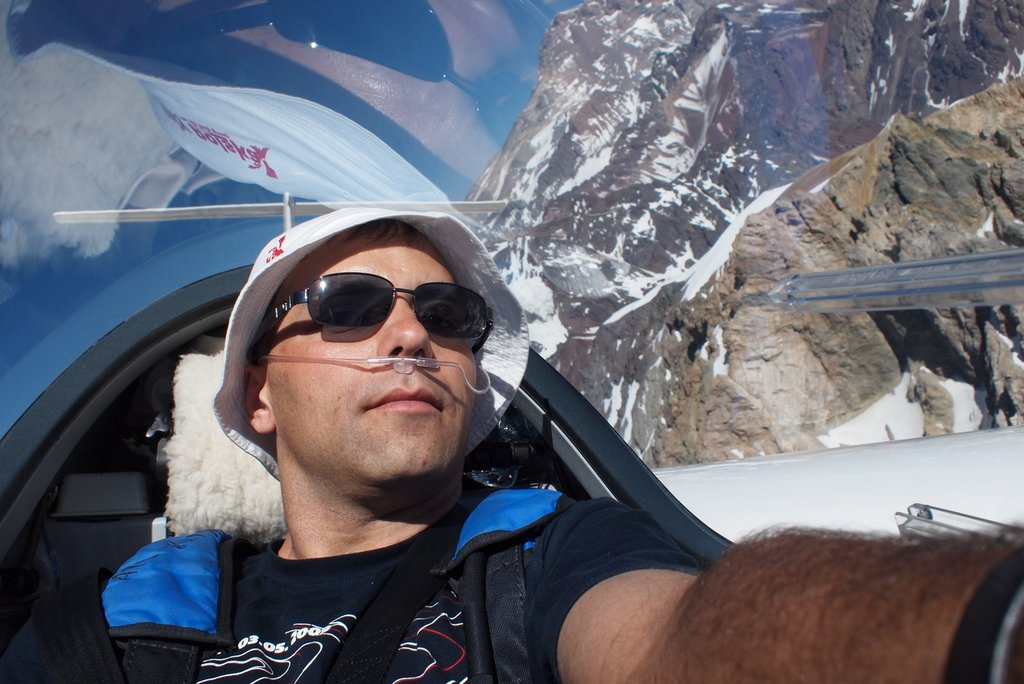
- Sebastian Kawa, training flight over the Aconcagua
- Born: 15 November 1972 (age 53); Zabrze, Poland
- Known for: Most World Champion titles in gliding history, 2004-2018 among top 3 ranked FAI glider pilots, four times World Grand Prix Champion
- Spouse: Anna
- Relatives: Father - Tomasz Kawa, glider pilot
- Aviation career
- First flight: 7 June 1988; SZD-50 Puchacz

Racing career
- First race: 1992 Polish Junior Nationals, 1st place win
- Best position: Current Standard and 15 m class World Champion
- Aircraft: SZD-56 Diana 2, Discus-2a, ASG 29
- Website: www.sebastiankawa.pl

Sebastian Kawa (born 15 November 1972, Zabrze) is a Polish glider pilot, eighteen-time World Champion, FAI world leading glider competition pilot, the World Champion in 15m Class, and European gliding champion in 18m Class. In 2024, together with Sebastian Lampart, he became the first pilot in aviation history to fly over K2 in a glider. He is the recipient of the FAI Gold Air Medal, the highest distinction conferred by the Fédération Aéronautique Internationale (World Air Sports Federation).

Kawa is a second-generation glider pilot who, together with his father Tomasz Kawa (an accomplished competition pilot as well), is associated with the Mountain Gliding School "Żar" in southern Poland. In his youth, before becoming a pilot, Sebastian Kawa was a competitive sailor in Cadet, Optimist and 420 class, with multiple titles in national championships and participation in top level European and world events. He is also (like his parents) a qualified physician, working at the General Hospital in Bielsko-Biała.

He is also known in the Polish gliding community for numerous Web writings and films popularizing the sport. His autobiography and advanced gliding tutorial Sky Full of Heat (English and Polish language editions) was published in December 2012.

== Sport biography ==
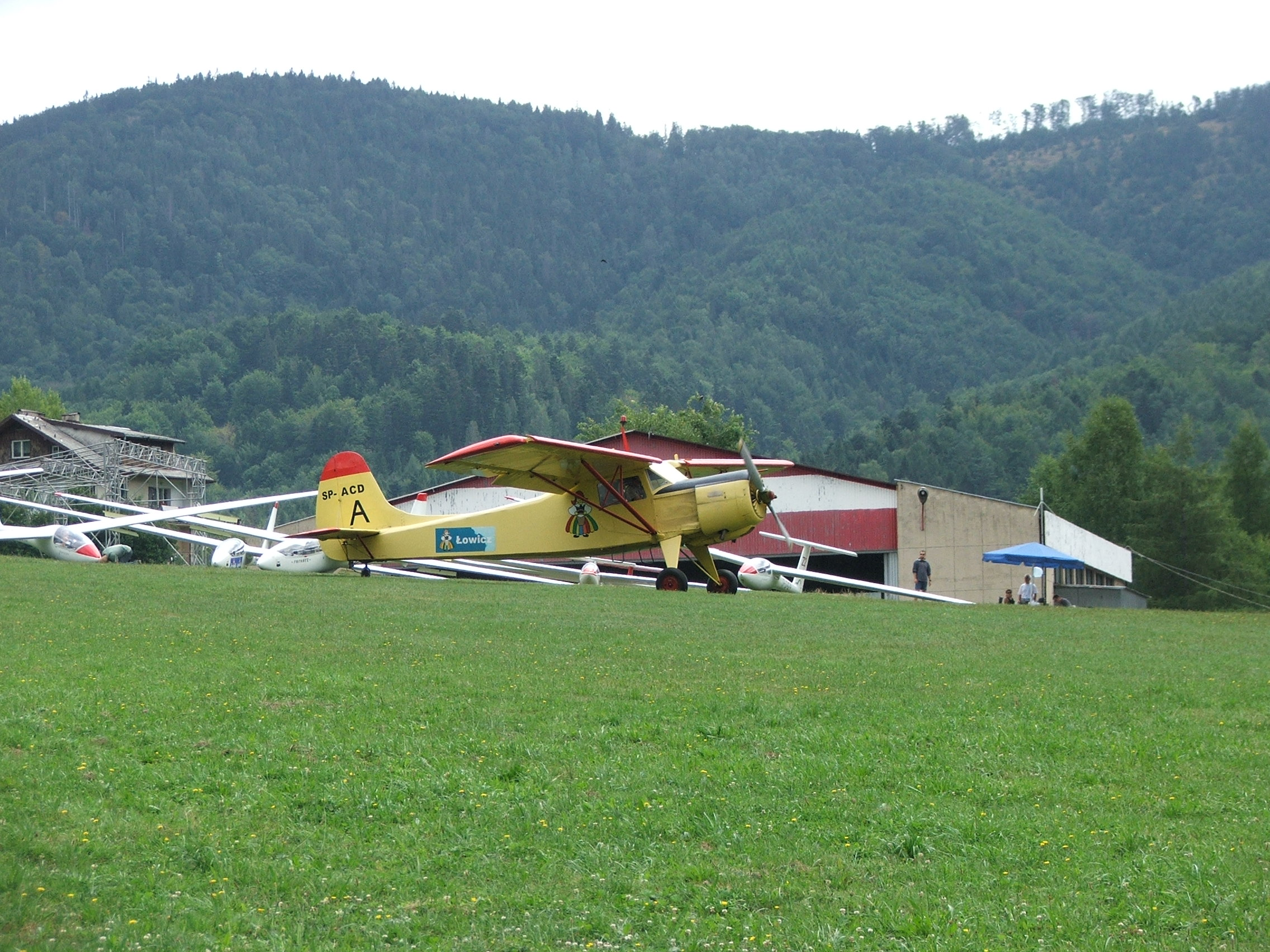
Tug plane and gliders in front of the hangar of the Mountain Gliding School "Żar"

=== Family tradition ===
Sebastian Kawa's parents, both physicians, settled in Międzybrodzie Żywieckie so his father Tomasz could practice gliding (as a competitor and instructor) at the nearby Mountain Gliding School "Żar". The Mountain Gliding School "Żar" is one of the birth places of the sport in Poland. Tomasz Kawa is a longtime top level glider pilot and, among other accomplishments, represented Poland in the World Championships.

=== Sailing ===
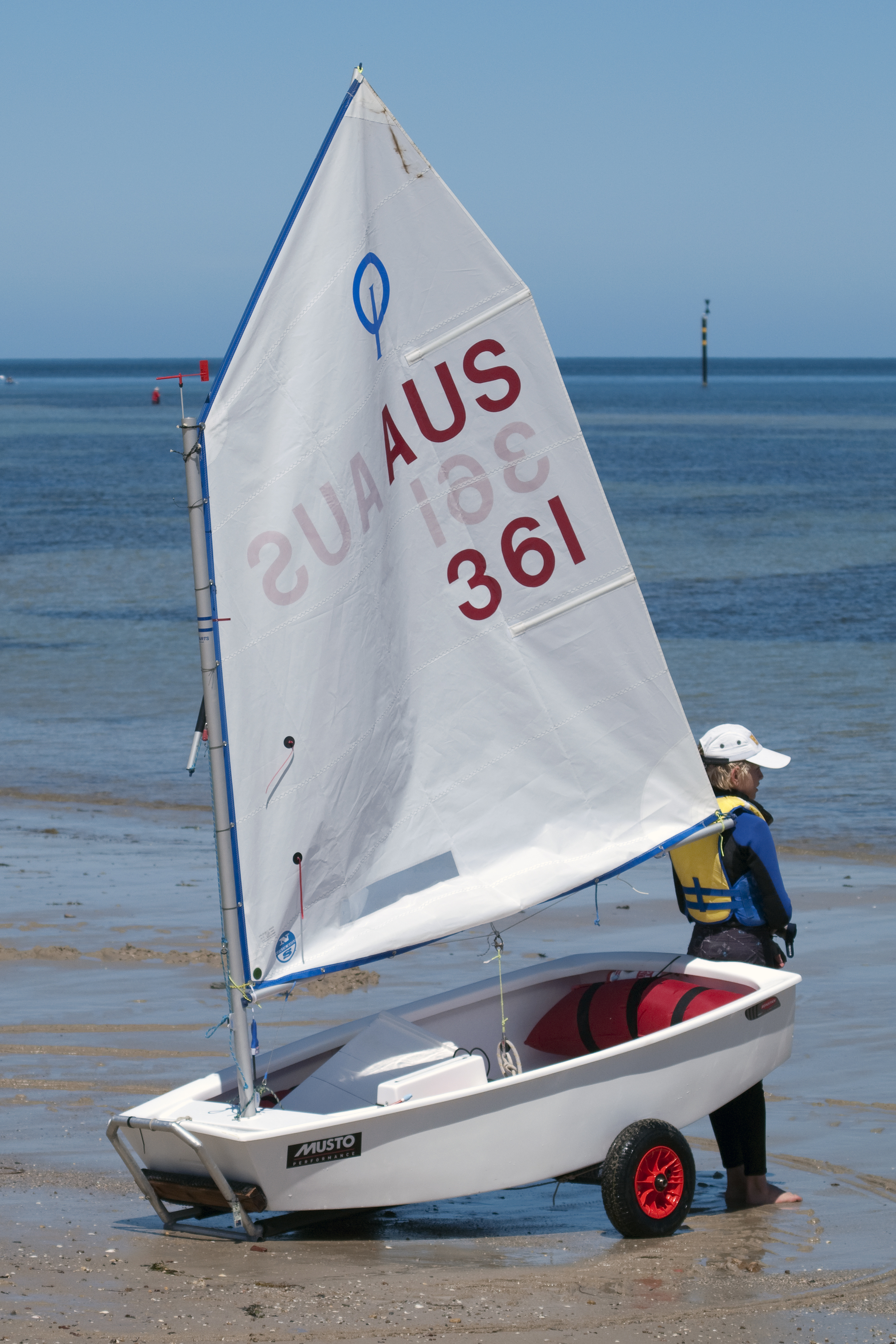
Optimist class boat, where Sebastian Kawa started his competitive sailing career

The "gliding roots" notwithstanding, Sebastian Kawa's first sporting activity was competitive sailing. He was a member of the sailing club "Neptune", sponsored by the local automobile factory (FSM Bielsko). From 8 to 18 years of age he raced in the Cadet, Optimist, and 420 classes. He regularly placed first in National Championships and represented Poland in World Championships. Sebastian Kawa fondly recalls receiving a trophy (2nd place) from Princess Diana after one of the races off the shore of Wales. As his club did not belong to the mainstream of the power structure of the Polish sport establishment (a recurring theme throughout his sporting career), Kawa sometimes had to overcome obstacles caused by bureaucratic favoritism.

At age 18 Sebastian Kawa had to quit competitive sailing. At this age, the sports rules required a transition to the classes of sailboats his club was not equipped with (e.g. 470 class) and could not afford. The transition from the communist rule in Poland and associated changes in industrial ownership caused his club to lose the sponsor. This probably cost Sebastian Kawa his chances for an Olympic sports career in sailing.

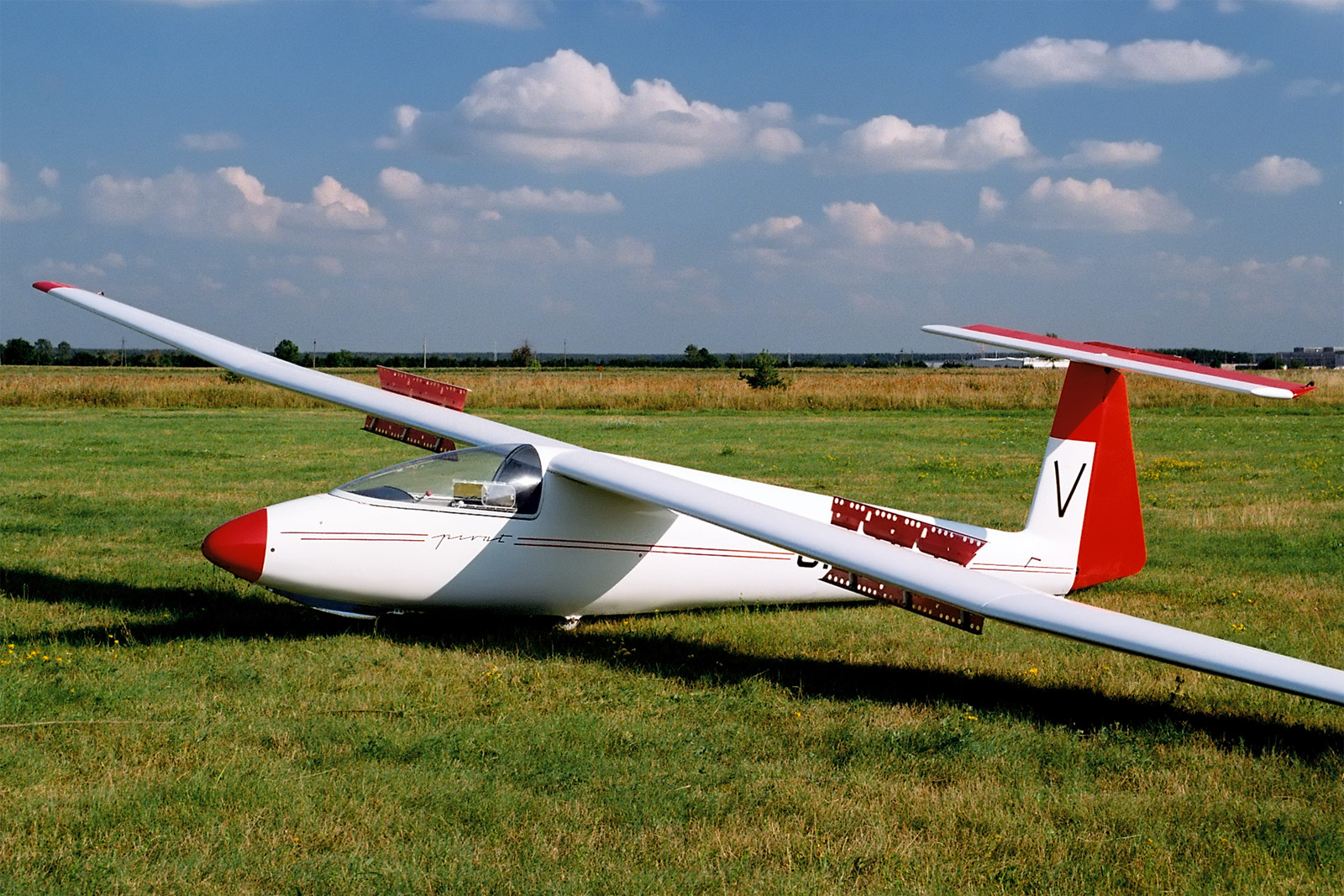
Pirat, type Sebastian Kawa started his cross country flight training in 1989

=== Flight training ===
In the meantime, at the age of 16, Sebastian Kawa completed ab-initio gliding training and became a student pilot in July 1988. For the next 2 years, all while engaged in sailing, he quickly advanced in subsequent stages of glider pilot training, logging over 200 hours. In 1989, he gained his first "diamond" to the gliding badge (declared 300 km closed loop flight) and made the >3 km gain of altitude flight. He trained extensively in Pirat, Junior, Foka and Cobra gliders. He also obtained glider ratings for night and instrument flying. During this time, he also commenced extensive cross country flight training. In his biography, Kawa credits his father for passing him the knowledge and experience necessary to compete effectively in this sport.

=== Competitive gliding ===
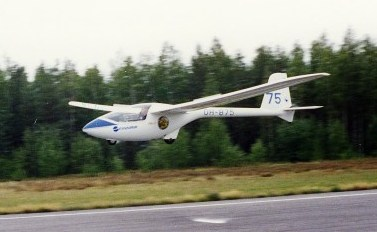
PW-5, first bronze medal World Championship win for Sebastian Kawa (1999)

From 1992, when he won the Polish Junior Nationals in Leszno flying the Junior glider, Sebastian Kawa advanced to progressively more elite gliding competitions, gradually improving his placements up to the 3rd place in the 1999 World Championships in the World (PW-5) class and winning in 2003 in the same class. From then on, he won almost every topmost level competition he started in, accumulating 9 gold medals at the world championship level and becoming the most decorated gliding pilot in history.

In his biography, Sebastian Kawa describes the process of accumulating the experience and knowledge necessary to compete at an elite level. He expresses the opinion that "it takes about 10 years of maximal concentration and effort to get to fly against the masters". In many places, however, he notes the ever-present factor of chance in aviation, referring to, and in the spirit of the cult book "Fate Is the Hunter" by Ernest Gann, the chance which had to be reckoned with, even with detailed and knowledgeable planning.

In November 2024, he was awarded the FAI Gold Air Medal, the highest honour conferred by the Fédération Aéronautique Internationale, becoming the first Pole to receive such recognition. The ceremony took place in Riyadh in the presence of the Saudi Royal Family.

== Personal life ==
Sebastian Kawa graduated (some classes with honors) from the city of Żywiec high school and got his medical degree from Medical University of Silesia (obstetrics and gynaecology). He described his work at the Bielsko-Biała General Hospital by the remark, "...it seems all children choose to be born at midnight". In his free time, Sebastian Kawa actively teaches at Mountain Gliding School "Żar". He is married to Anna, with two children.

== Gliding instructor ==
Sebastian Kawa is very active promoting the sport, and teaching and training gliding enthusiasts at all competence levels (including student pilots). Training with him is often available individually at the Mountain Gliding School "Żar" and during training camps organized jointly by the Mountain Gliding School "Żar" and Karkonosze Gliding Association.

== Current/Recent major competition ==
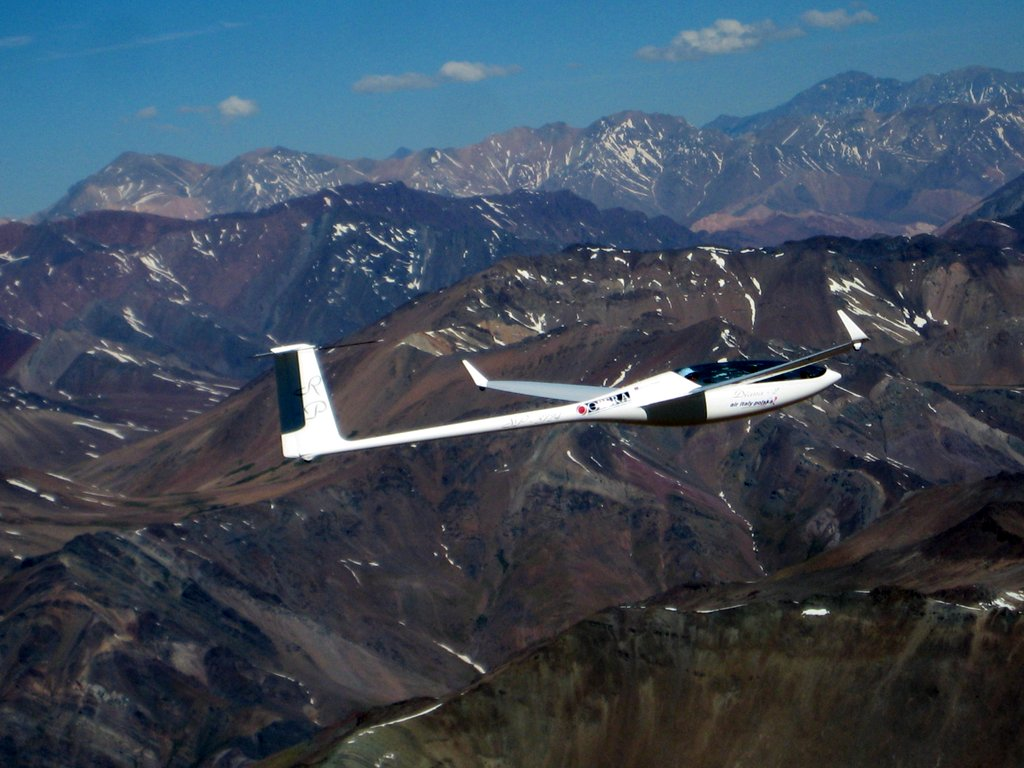
Diana 2, glider Sebastian Kawa flew to his recent gold medal win at 2012 Uvalde 15m WGC competition

Sebastian Kawa won the Champion title in the 18m Class at the 17th European Gliding Championships 2013 at Vinon-sur-Verdon: this was his first major title in the 18m Class. Kawa defended the European Champion title in the Standard Class at the 17th FAI European Gliding Championships in Ostrów Wielkopolski (5–20 July 2013). After two silver medals in Sisteron and Räyskälä in 2014, Sebastian defended the 15m class champion title again in Leszno Wilkopolskie. Since gliding classes have multiplied (with 20m class and 13.5m class added recently), there are two editions of competitions each year: with Sailplane Grand Prix it gives three possibilities to participate in FAI first class events every second year (except if competitions fall at the turn of the year). In 2015, Sebastian Kawa defended his 18m class title from France, winning the competition in Őcsény. He claims the busy season did not give a chance to prepare for SGP finals in Varese, resulting in a bronze medal.

=== Highlights of Vinon-sur-Verdon (18m Class) competition ===
Position after 9th and the last competition day: first, giving the Europe Champion title.

- Day 1: very late and handicapped start (4pm for 400 km, 50 min after main competitors, >600 m lower), from well below allowed altitude due to very weak thermal conditions near airfield. Managed to place 4th flying a good synergy of thermal and ridge lifts on the second half of the course.
- Day 2: tricky conditions at first part of the task (subtle subinversion blue wave). Deep penetration of AAT areas (second mileage of the day) flown to a second place.
- Day 3: decisive win (>10 min ahead of next competitor) flown ahead of the gaggle. Edge over well acquainted with local conditions French competitors possibly partly due to unusual for the season weather (very wet), negating and reversing their advantage of intimacy with the local airflow patterns. Move to the lead in general classification.
- Day 4: a solid win (task done 5 min faster than next competitor) while initially chasing the gaggle. Kawa had problems with getting an adequate start altitude, which allowed main competitors to break away at the start with a 5-minute lead. Keeping the visual contact, Kawa managed to chase them into the upper parts of the Alps, where the combined skills and experience of present pilots assured safe and speedy transit of the whole group. A final breakaway attempt by Kawa failed due to mastery of knowledge of the local wind patterns by French competitors.
- Day 5: a win in time close to minimum allowed. A rather chaotic day caused by weak, unpredictable and rapidly changing weather. Kawa's report suggests that the outcome was decided by both luck and meticulous husbanding of whatever the luck offered. At one point an advantage of a few meters in altitude was what decisively put him ahead of part of competitors, who could not fly the straight route over a particular ridge he could. Didier Hauss used his knowledge of the area to fly (with some companions) deeper into assigned areas, but this turned against him as the conditions deteriorated penalizing those tarrying longer.
- Day 6: task in a rain over the mountains, with Kawa 10th with a dismal speed and as a late last of those who finished the task. In places the decisions to race aggressively had the potential downside of a forced landing in the mountains, depending how the dice lands. Half of the competitors did not finish. Jaroslav Tomana of the Czech team flew the longest route to the win, with French team placing close second. Remarkable accomplishment for a non-local Czech pilot in very hard conditions. Kawa slipped to second position in a general classification.
- Day 7: second place in an unpredictable weather. One of competitors crashed. Last finishing competitor landing close to the sunset almost 2 hours past the winner. Maintaining second position in a general classification.
- June 17: competition for the day cancelled due to a fatal glider crash on the previous day.
- June 18: competition for the day cancelled
- June 19: competition for the day cancelled
- Day 8: third, but Didier who restarted the task over an hour later came eight, so Sebastian regained the lead. Didier Hauss gambled and restarted the task in the middle of the first attempt to take advantage of improving weather, the gamble failed.
- Day 9: 4th, but with Didier Hauss outlanding this was enough to defend the first position in general classification for the Champion title. Both Kawa and Hauss flew individually and aggressively (as opposed to just defend their 1st and 2nd positions flying in a gaggle), which had put both in tight corners.

=== 2013 FAI European Gliding Championships ===
17th FAI European Gliding Championships (2013) in Ostrów Wielkopolski (5–20 July 2013). Sebastian Kawa competed in the Standard Class, flying Schempp-Hirth Discus-2a and defending his 2011 Champion title.

- Day 1: Sebastian Kawa took 1st, Christophe Cousseau of France 2nd. Incidentally it is exactly the same order as final results of 18 metre class Championship competition a month before. Sebastian Kawa mentioned the deteriorating weather as one of the factors allowing him to win – such conditions gave the advantage to pilots flying aggressively to lead.
- Day 2: 1st position again, leading two other team members (Paweł Wojciechowski and Łukasz Wójcik) to 2nd and 3rd place. This was an AAT task, Polish team took the longest route. What is interesting, the team flew together to a win in 2 different types of gliders (Discus2a/ax and LS8).
- Day 3: 1st, for a perfect score of 3000 points for 3 days. Places 2 and 3 taken by Łukasz Wójcik and Paweł Wojciechowski.
- Day 4: 2nd, with 999 points due to a 7-second loss over 438 km course to the winner, Łukasz Wójcik. Again, Polish team took first 3 spots. Remaining at the lead of general Standard Class classification.
- Day 5: 2nd, behind Radek Krejcirik of the Czech Republic. Polish team keeps top three positions in overall classification, with Sebastian Kawa first.
- Day 6: 2nd (behind Peter Millenaar of Netherlands).
- Day 7: first.
- Day 8: 2nd (all 3 pilots of the Polish team took first 3 spots).
- Day 9: 13th. Close shave, Sebastian Kawa nearly outlanded (happened to half of the competitors this day). Remaining as #1 in the general classification.
- Day 10: 15th. Late start due to instrumentation problems, some competitors managed to use the wave lift (rare occurrence in the lowlands competition area). Enough to win first place overall (with 2 other Polish pilots in the Standard class – Łukasz Wójcik and Paweł Wojciechowski – taking silver and bronze medals).

== Himalaya Gliding Project ==
In late 2013, Kawa was engaged in reconnaissance to learn of practical gliding conditions in the high parts of the Himalayas mountain range. The aim was to fly over the highest peaks of Nepal using a Schleicher ASH 25Mi glider.

On 20 July 2024, Kawa and Sebastian Lampart took off in a Schleicher ASH 25 glider from Skardu and soared over K2 and Masherbrum. The flight was the culmination of obtaining many permits and driving the glider overground from Poland to Pakistan. It was the first time a glider has flown over K2.

== Major titles ==
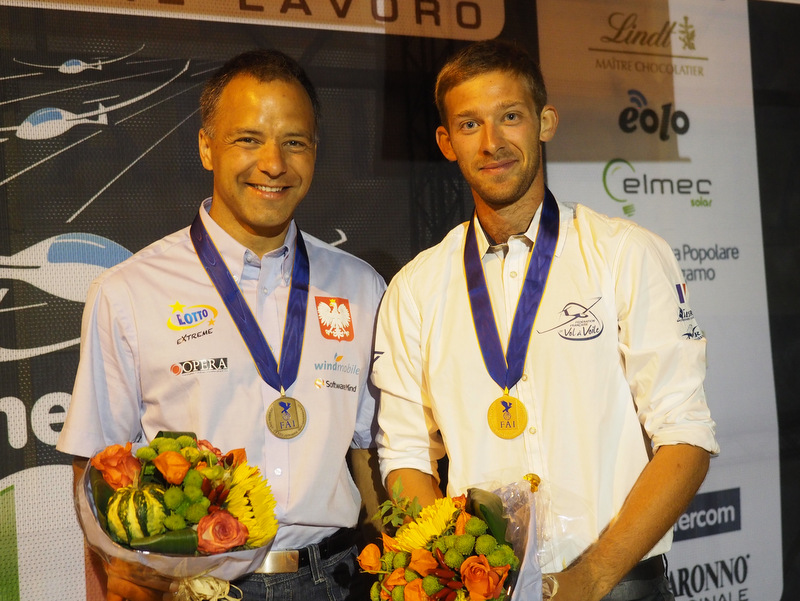
Sebastian Kawa (POL) and Maximilian Seis (FRA), winners of Sailplane Grand Prix 2015 Varese (ITA)

By winning his fifth World Champion title (Grand Prix excluded) in 2012 (Uvalde), Sebastian Kawa became the most successful Championships pilot in history, exceeding the lifelong record of Ingo Renner of Australia, who had four championship titles. Since then, Kawa has won eight more World Championships, at Chavez (2013), Leszno (2014), Benalla (2017), Ostrów Wielkopolski (2018), Hosin (2018), Stalowa Wola (2019), Prievidza (2019), and Montluçon–Guéret (2021).

Sebastian Kawa held a world record for the "Three Turn Points Distance" in World Class in 1999, but this has since been superseded.

Competition	Venue	Year	Category	Result
World Championships	POL Leszno	1999	World Class	Bronze
World Championships	ESP Lillo	2001	World Class	Bronze
World Championships	SVK Nitra	2003	World Class	Gold
World Championships	NOR Elverum	2004	Club Class	Gold
World Championships	FRA Saint-Auban	2005	Grand Prix	Gold
European Championships	SVK Nitra	2005	Club Class	Gold
World Championships	FRA Vinon-sur-Verdon	2006	Club Class	Gold
European Championships	LTU Pociūnai	2007	Club Class	Gold
World Championships	NZL Omarama	2007	Grand Prix	Gold
World Air Games	ITA Turin	2009	Grand Prix	Gold
World Championships	CHL Santiago	2010	Grand Prix	Gold
World Championships	SVK Prievidza	2010	Standard Class	Gold
European Championships	SVK Nitra	2011	Standard Class	Gold
World Championships	USA Uvalde	2012	15m	Gold
World Championships	Argentina Chavez	2013	Standard Class	Gold
European Championships	FRA Vinon-sur-Verdon	2013	18m	Gold
European Championships	POL Ostrów Wielkopolski	2013	Standard Class	Gold
World Championships	FRA Sisteron	2014	Grand Prix	Silver
World Championships	FIN Räyskälä Airfield	2014	Standard Class	Silver
World Championships	POL Leszno	2014	15m	Gold
European Championships	HUN Őcsény	2015	18m	Gold
World Championships	ITA Varese	2015	Grand Prix	Bronze
World Championships	AUS Benalla	2017	15m	Gold
World Championships	CHL Vitacura	2018	Grand Prix	Gold
World Championships	POL Ostrów Wielkopolski	2018	15m	Gold
World Championships	CZE Hosín	2018	20m	Gold
European Championships	POL Stalowa Wola	2019	18m	Gold
World Championships	ESP Cerdanya	2019	Grand Prix	Silver
European Championships	SVK Prievidza	2019	15m	Gold
World Championships	FRA Montluçon–Guéret	2021	15m	Gold
World Championships	AUS Narromine	2023	15m	Gold

== Sponsors ==
A longtime sponsor of Sebastian Kawa is the local government of the city of Bielsko-Biała, along with Lotto Extreme, TFI Opera, and Ailleron.

== Sources ==
- Personal website of Sebastian Kawa (in Polish)
- Everest Gliding project website
- Sebastian Kawa, condorul polonez(in Romanian); Pilot magazin, 24 2010
- 3rd FAI World Sailplane Grand Prix Final; in Gliding International, March 2010
- Kawa, Sebastian (2012). Sky Full of Heat. ELAY & SCG. p. 346. ISBN 978-1481147354.
