= Turin-Aeritalia Airport =

Turin-Aeritalia Airport Aeroporto di Torino-Aeritalia
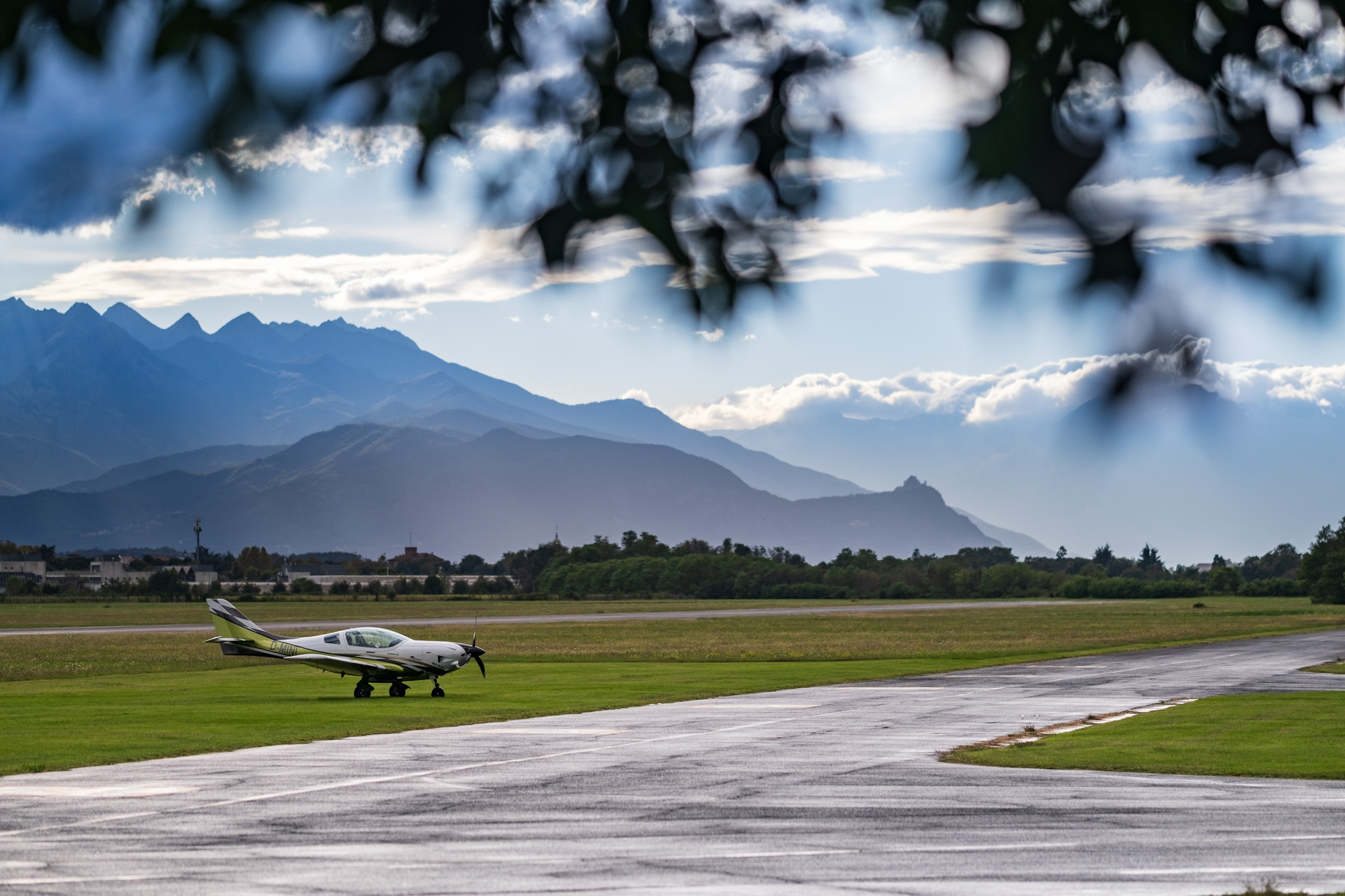
- IATA: none; ICAO: LIMA

Summary
- Airport type: Private
- Operator: Aeroclub Torino
- Location: Turin, Piedmont, Italy
- Elevation AMSL: 943 ft / 288 m
- Coordinates: 45°05′20″N 007°36′20″E
- Website: www.AeroclubTorino.it

Map
- Location of airport in Turin Location of airport in Piedmont Location of Piedmont region in Italy

Runways
Direction	Length		Surface
Direction	m	ft	Surface
28R/10L	1,074	3,524	Paved Asphalt
28L/10R	750	2,461	Grass
28/10	500	1,640	Grass

Turin-Aeritalia Airport (Italian: Aeroporto di Torino-Aeritalia, ICAO: LIMA) also known as Edoardo Agnelli Airport, built in 1916, is the historical airport of Turin in the Piedmont region of northern Italy. It is located off Corso Marche, some 5 km (3 mi) to the west of the city centre.

Commercial flights moved to Turin Caselle Airport in 1953 and today Turin-Aeritalia is used for tourist flights and as a flying school, both for gliding and powered flight. There is also a helipad for the use of air ambulances.

One of the airport's buildings was redesigned in 1958 by the Turinese architect Carlo Mollino.
