= Schleicher ASW 27 =

Single-seat German glider, 1995

ASW 27
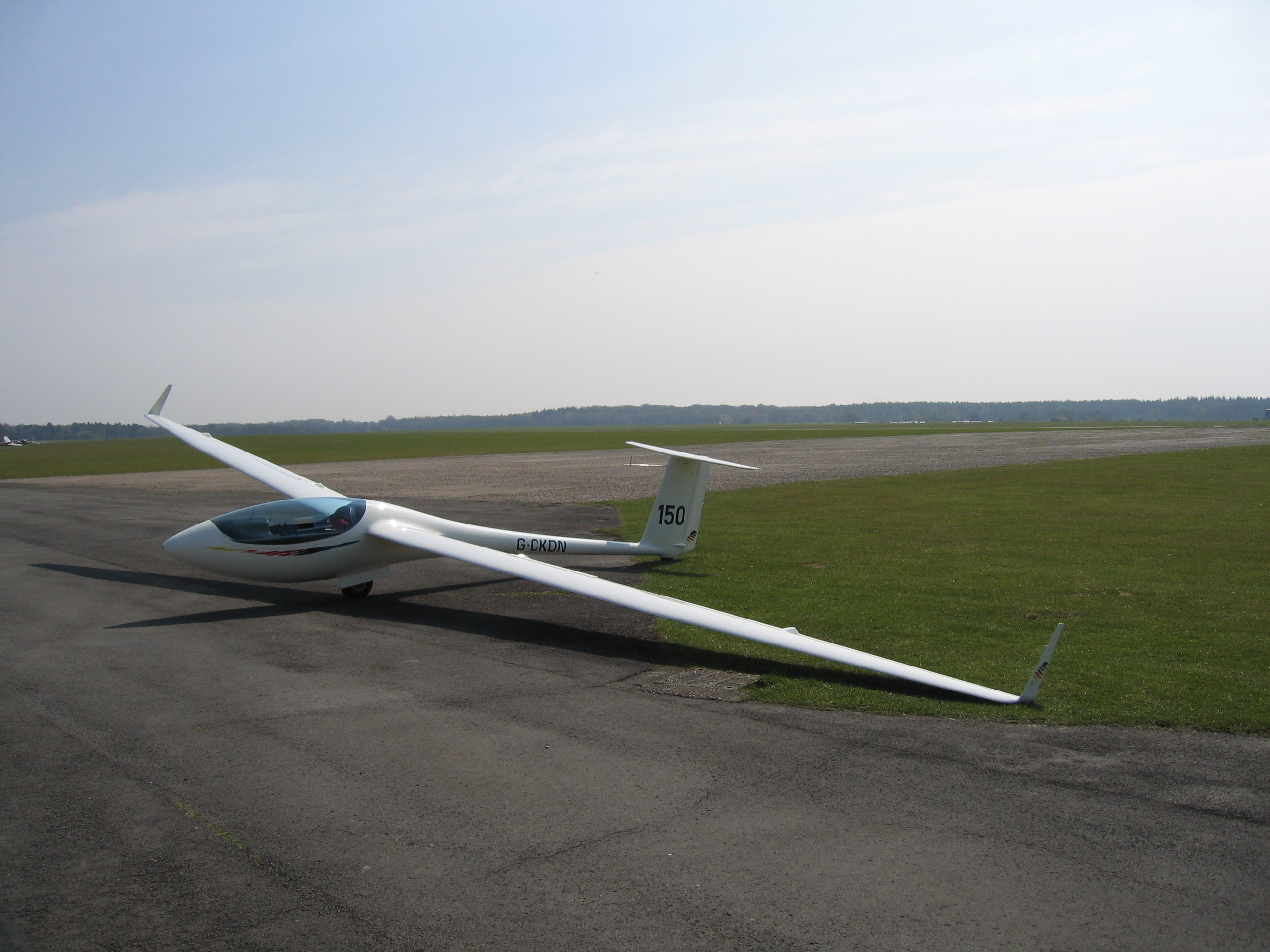

General information
- Type: 15 metre-class sailplane
- National origin: Germany
- Manufacturer: Schleicher
- Designer: Gerhard Waibel
- Number built: 237 by 2009

History
- First flight: 1995

External image
- Schleicher ASW 27 on aerotow

The ASW 27 is a 15 metre Class glider built of modern fibre reinforced composites, which first flew in 1995 and was certified in 1997. The manufacturer of the ASW 27 is Alexander Schleicher GmbH & Co. The "W" indicates this is a design of the influential and prolific German designer Gerhard Waibel.

== Design and development ==
The ASW 27 has plain flaps, winglets, a retractable undercarriage and a water ballast system. The ASW 27 superseded the ASW 20 in the manufacturer's production line.

The structure is a complex composite of carbon, aramid and polyethylene fibre reinforced plastic. This permits a light structure with the strength to carry large amounts of water ballast, thus permitting the widest possible range of wing loadings for weak and strong soaring weather. The strong fuselage was tested for crash protection by dropping one from a crane.

The winglets were standard equipment from the beginning, but were later enlarged in the ASW-27B development. The "B" also has tanks to hold water ballast rather than bags. The ASW 27 does not have a version with wing extensions for 18 metres. This was a design decision to pursue an uncompromised 15 metre racer, as "future engine retrofits or later wingspan increases were specifically ruled out".

The introduction of the ASG 29 gave the ASW 27 a stablemate that can compete in the same class, although the 29 is intended to fly primarily with an 18-metre span and can be motorised. Because of the overlap with the ASG 29, production of the ASW27 has now ceased.

== Specifications ==
Data from flight manual

General characteristics

- Crew: 1
- Length: 6.55 m (21 ft 6 in)
- Wingspan: 15 m (49 ft 3 in)
- Wing area: 9 m^{2} (97 sq ft)
- Aspect ratio: 25
- Airfoil: Root: DU 89-134/14, Tip: DU 94-086 M4
- Empty weight: 245 kg (540 lb)
- Gross weight: 500 kg (1,102 lb)

Performance

- Never exceed speed: 285 km/h (177 mph, 154 kn)
- Rough air speed max: 215 km/h (134 mph; 116 kn)
- Aerotow speed: 170 km/h (110 mph; 92 kn)
- Winch launch speed: 130 km/h (81 mph; 70 kn)
- Minimum control speed: 70 km/h (43 mph, 38 kn) with no ballast and full flaps
- g limits: +5.3 -2.65 at 215 km/h (134 mph; 116 kn)
- Maximum glide ratio: 48
- Rate of sink: 0.58 m/s (114 ft/min) (minimum)

== See also ==
Related lists

- List of gliders
