= Schleicher ASG 29 =

German sailplane, 2006

ASG 29
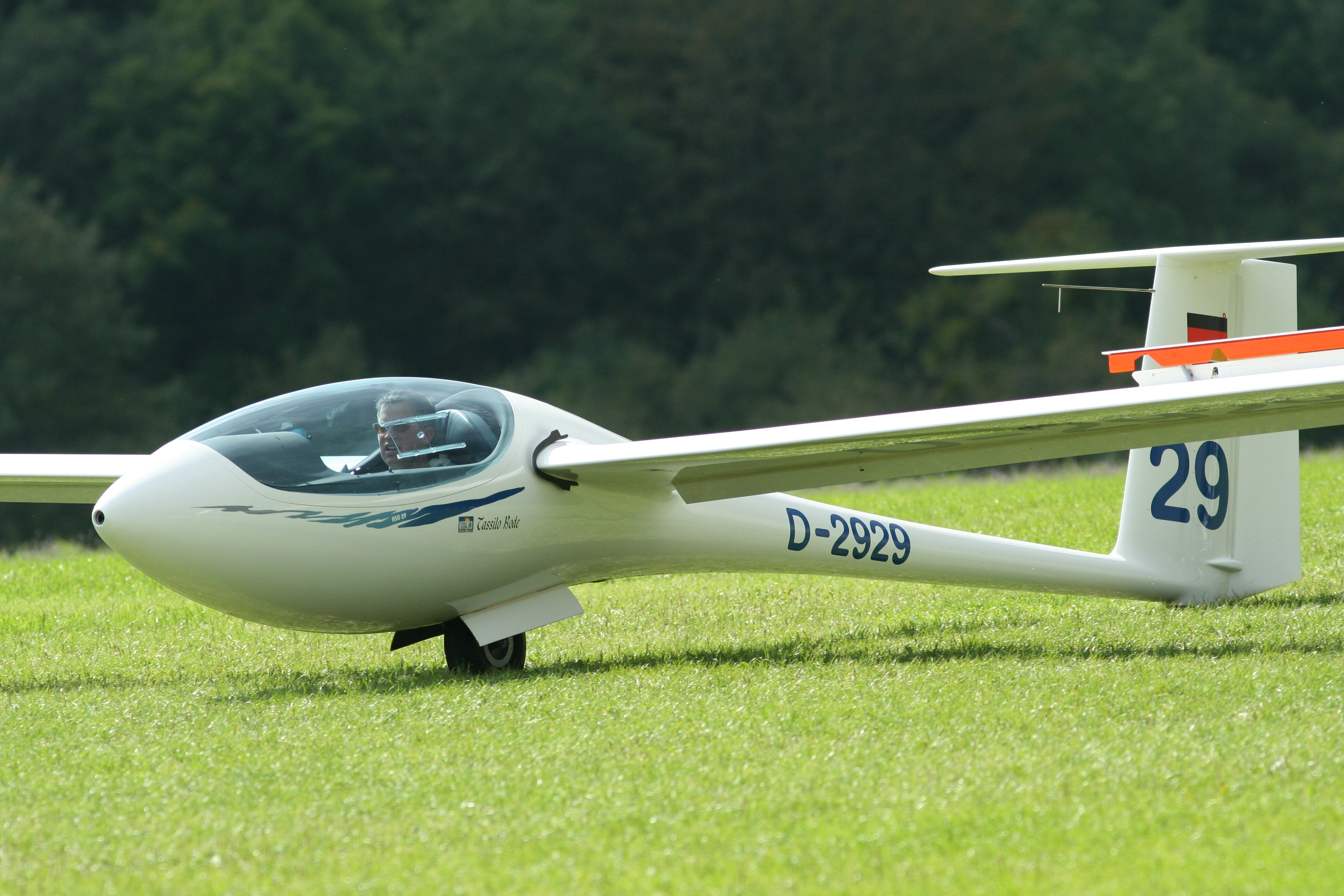

General information
- Type: 15 metre-class and 18 metre-class sailplane
- National origin: Germany
- Manufacturer: Schleicher
- Designer: Michael Greiner
- Status: active
- Number built: 246+

History
- Introduction date: 2006
- First flight: November 2005

The Schleicher ASG 29 is a German sailplane manufactured by Alexander Schleicher GmbH & Co since 2006. It can be flown as an 18 metre Class glider or as a 15 metre Class glider. The 'G' indicates a design by Michael Greiner. It is a refinement of the popular ASW-27 and for certification purposes it is designated the ASW-27-18. It has been replaced by the Schleicher AS 33.

== Development ==
The ASG 29 has plain flaps and winglets. The structure is a complex composite of carbon, aramid and polyethylene fibre reinforced plastic. This permits a light structure with the strength to carry up to 170 liters (322 pounds) of water ballast, thus permitting the widest possible range of wing loadings for weak and strong soaring weather.

The unmotorised version made its first flight on 9 November 2005. The 'E' version has a self-sustaining engine (SOLO 2350, 18 hp 2-stroke) and was certified in February 2008.

By August 2014 the numbers of ASG29 produced had reached 163 turbos and 87 pure gliders.

== Specifications (with 18m wings) ==
General characteristics

- Crew: One
- Capacity: 202 kg (447 lb) water ballast
- Length: 6.59 m (21 ft 7 in)
- Wingspan: 18.00 m (59 ft 1 in)
- Height: 1.30 m (4 ft 3 in)
- Wing area: 10.5 m^{2} (113 sq ft)
- Aspect ratio: 30.4
- Empty weight: 280 kg (617 lb)
- Gross weight: 600 kg (1,323 lb)
- Powerplant: 1 × SOLO 2350 (E)

Performance

- Maximum speed: 270 km/h (168 mph, 146 kn)
- Maximum glide ratio: 50
- Rate of sink: 0.47 m/s (92.5 ft/min)

== See also ==
Related lists

- List of gliders
