= Schempp-Hirth Ventus-2 =

German single-seat glider, 1994

Ventus-2
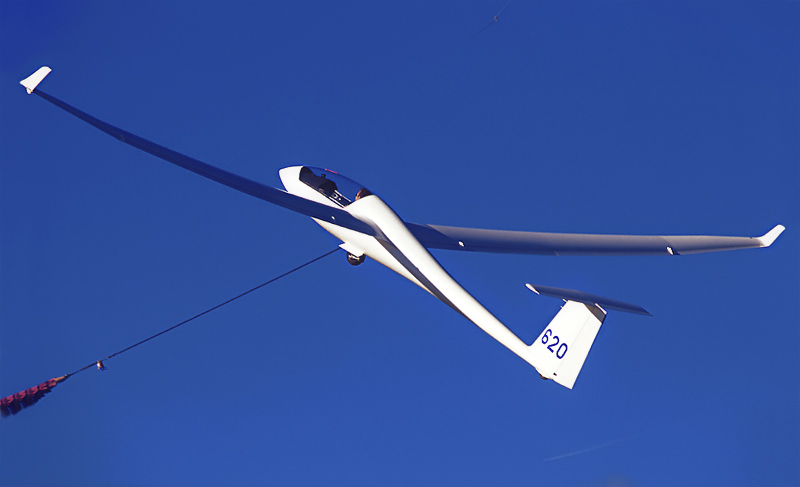
- Ventus 2b being winch-launched at Lasham airfield

General information
- Type: 15 metre-class and 18 metre-class sailplane
- National origin: Germany
- Manufacturer: Schempp-Hirth
- Number built: 627

History
- First flight: 1994

The Schempp-Hirth Ventus-2 is a sailplane produced by Schempp-Hirth since 1994. It replaced the highly successful Schempp-Hirth Ventus.

== Design and development ==
The Ventus-2a and 2b are 15 metre sailplanes. The 'a' version has a narrow fuselage and the wider fuselage version is called the 2b. Winglets are used with these models. The 18 metre span Ventus-2c was introduced in 1995 and was almost an entirely different aircraft with a different fuselage and wings, but it has the option of shorter tips with winglets to fly as a 15-metre sailplane.

From 2003 the Schempp-Hirth Discus-2 fuselage was used for all versions, which now have the designations 2ax, 2bx and 2cx. Flight tests in 1996 showed that the 15 metre version had a glide angle of 46:1 but only after considerable work on sealing gaps and by using turbulators.

The narrow fuselage Ventus-2a has been highly successful in competitions with consecutive World Championship wins from 1995 to 2003. A narrow fuselage version with an 18-metre span, the Ventus 2cxa has also been built.

Some Ventus-2c and 2cx are fitted with small Solo 2350 sustaining engines (turbos) and are designated with a T suffix, while some are self-launching with a more powerful Solo 2625 and have the suffix 'M'. The 2cT climbs at up to 0.9 m/s (177 ft/min) and the 2cM at over 3 m/s (590 ft/min). Ranges for the powered versions in saw-tooth operation are 370 km (230 mi) and 840 km (520 mi) respectively. The 2cxa has been designed to take a jet engine. A small number of Ventus 2 were fitted with the front electric sustainer.

Production of the 2a and 2b has reached 168 aircraft, while the 2c, 2cT, and 2CM have reached 459.

A replacement model, the Ventus 3, first flew on 29 January 2016 and serial production started in April 2016.

== Specifications (Ventus-2cx with 15 metre wings) ==
General characteristics

- Crew: One
- Capacity: 200 kg (440 lb) water ballast
- Length: 6.81 m (22 ft 4 in)
- Wingspan: 15.00 m (50 ft 9 in)
- Height: 1.30 m (4 ft 3 in)
- Wing area: 9.7 m^{2} (104 sq ft)
- Aspect ratio: 23.3
- Empty weight: 290 kg (640 lb)
- Gross weight: 525 kg (1,155 lb)

Performance

- Maximum speed: 285 km/h (180 mph, 160 kn)
- Maximum glide ratio: 46
- Rate of sink: 0.51 m/s (100 ft/min)

== See also ==
Related lists

- List of gliders
