= L40 =

L40 may refer to:

- IBM PS/2 L40 SX, a portable computer
- HMS Westminster (L40), a destroyer of the Royal Navy
- Mitochondrial ribosomal protein L40
- New Flyer L40, a Canadian bus
- Orličan L-40 Meta Sokol, a Czechoslovak sports and touring aircraft
- Pentax Optio L40, a digital camera
- Toyota Paseo (L40), a subcompact car
- Toyota Tercel (L40), a subcompact car
