= LET L-13 Blaník =

Two-seater trainer glider

L-13 Blaník
- Penn State Soaring Club L-13 flying over State College, Pennsylvania, showing forward-swept wing

General information
- Type: Two Seater class sailplane
- National origin: Czechoslovakia
- Manufacturer: Let Kunovice
- Designer: Karel Dlouhý
- Status: flying
- Number built: more than 3000

History
- Manufactured: 1958–1978
- First flight: 1956
- Variant: Blanik TG-10 L-13A L-13AC L-13SW L-13B L-13TJ

The L-13 Blaník is a two-seater trainer glider produced by Let Kunovice since 1956. It is the most numerous and widely used glider in the world. In United States Air Force Academy service, it is designated TG-10C and was used for basic flight training up to 2012.

== Design ==
Flaps deployed for landing - torpedo tips clearly visible, and air brakes partially open

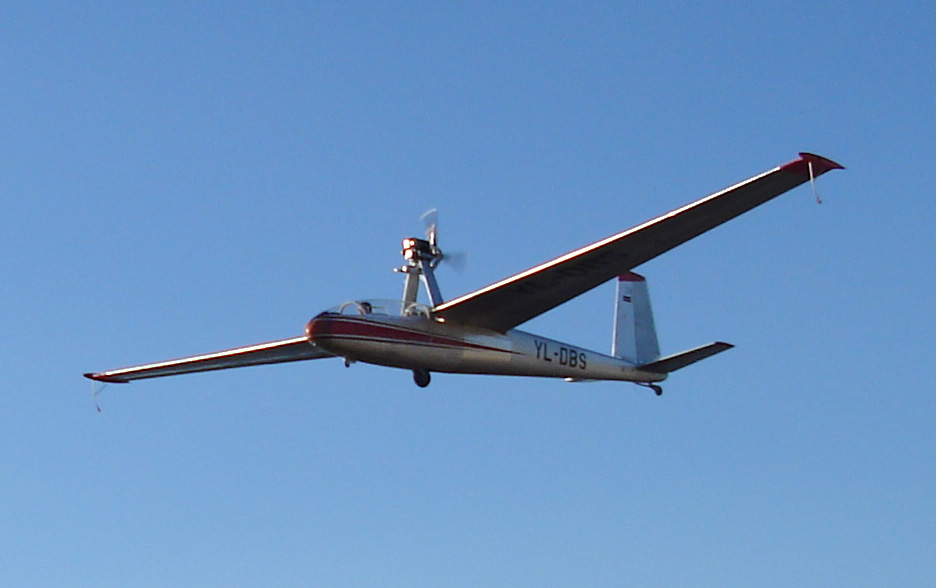
Motorglider LET L-13M Blanik over Vecaki, Riga - Latvia

- Fuselage of semi-monocoque construction employing longerons and bulkheads, with an ovoid cross-section. The cockpit is covered with a two-part acrylic glass canopy.
- Trapezoidal single-taper wings with forward (negative) sweep, single-spar, all-metal construction. Metal ‘salmon’ tips. Flaps and ailerons have a metal frame and are covered in fabric. Metal DFS type spoilers on the upper and lower wing surfaces.
- The horizontal tail surfaces fold up parallel to the fin for transportation and storage.
- The elevator and rudder are metal frames covered in fabric.
- The main single-wheel landing gear is sprung with an oleo-pneumatic shock absorber. When retracted, it still protrudes enough outside so there is little or no damage even if the wheel is accidentally left in the raised position for landing.

== Development ==
The L-13 Blaník was designed by Karel Dlouhý of VZLÚ Letňany c. 1956, building upon the experience gained with the Letov XLF-207 Laminar, the first Czech glider to employ laminar flow wing profiles. The L-13 was developed as a practical glider suitable for basic flight instruction, aerobatic instruction and cross-country training. This design concept was combined with true and tested technology: metal construction, NACA laminar profiles and many standard-issue components of the Soviet aerospace industry.

The Blaník entered production in 1958 and quickly gained popularity as an inexpensive, rugged and durable type, which was easy to fly and operate. It was widely adopted in the Soviet bloc and was exported in large numbers to Western Europe and North America. Total production was in excess of 2650, or more than 3000 if variants are included. More than half a century after its first flight it is still the most common glider in the world.

The Blaník achieved many two-seater world distance records during the 1960s. The Blaník inspired other designs, notably the Démant and L-21 Spartak single-seaters developed to equip the Czechoslovak team in the 1956 and 1958 World Championships.

== Operational history ==
The effectiveness of the Blaník as a primary trainer is due to a blend of characteristics that facilitate progress of ab initio students towards solo flight, namely: slow landing speed, ample control deflections and an effective rudder. These are in effect typical of wood-and-fabric primary trainers such as the ASK 13, which the Blaník resembles in handling, though not in materials and construction.

The Blaník was originally stressed for simple aerobatics, including inverted flight where the aircraft has a single occupant. As a result of this latter requirement, intermediate level aerobatic training in the Blaník was done in solo flight with the instructor on the ground or in another aircraft. A manufacturer airworthiness directive in June 2010 asserted a prohibition against all aerobatic manoeuvres.

=== 2010 main-spar failure ===
A Blaník L-13 (not an L-13AC, which has a different wing and type certificate) was involved in a fatal accident in Austria on 12 June 2010, when a wing spar failed at height, leading to separation of the wing and loss of control of the aircraft. A newspaper reported the cause of the failure as excessive stress during a manoeuvre. However, the preliminary investigation revealed that the fracture may have been due to metal fatigue, and not necessarily from being overstressed. As a precaution, the manufacturer issued an emergency bulletin on 18 June 2010 directing that each aircraft be grounded pending a full inspection of wing spars, and compilation of usage patterns from logbook records. Following inspection, the aircraft would be permitted to fly on a non-aerobatic basis only.

== Variants ==
L-13 AC Blaník
The L-13 AC is primarily intended for aerobatic training with a wider flight envelope enabling dual training up to intermediate-level. It combines the wings and cockpit of the L-23 Super Blaník with the single-piece canopy and conventional empennage of the L-13. This model is considered stronger and different enough from a conventional L-13, L-13/AC uses a shorter L-23 wing and is not affected by 2010 spar issues of the L-13.

L-13 J
An auxiliary-powered Blaník was also developed, with an external Jawa engine permanently mounted on a pylon above the rear fuselage.

Sportinė Aviacija SL-2P
aka Kensgaila VK-7 A twin-fuselage Blaník was developed by Sportinė Aviacija in Lithuania as a flying laboratory for testing of laminar airfoils. The specimen profiles are fixed to a supporting frame erected between the fuselages. This variant is similar in concept to the modified Janus once operated by the DFVLR (today the DLR, or German Aerospace Center) for the same purpose.

L-13 TJ
(OK-3801) single-seat experimental motor glider fitted with a jet engine TJ-100C with take-off thrust 1,0 kN from První brněnská strojírna Velká Bíteš.

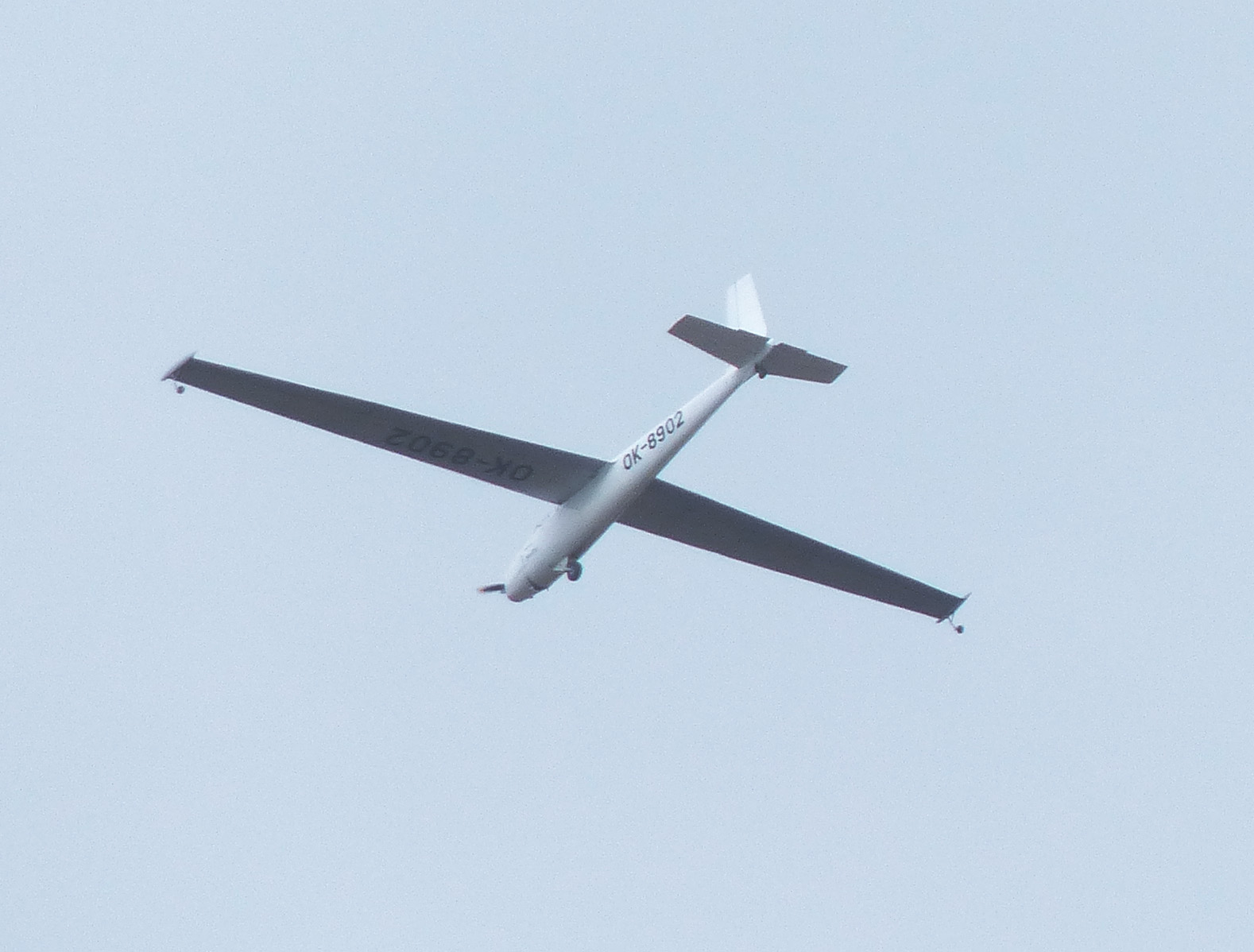
L-13 B "Bačostroj"

L-13 B Bačostroj
(OK-8902) single-seat experimental motor glider with Walter Mikron IIIA, 48 kW

L-13 A1
(Llewellyn Modification) to extend the fatigue life to nominally three times the basic Blanik L-13 life.

TG-10 Blanik
United States Air Force Academy, gliding school.

TZ-13
Brazilian Air Force designation of the L-13.

Aerotechnik L-13 Vivat
Touring motorglider derivative. The wings, fuselage and tail surfaces of the L-13 are mated to a cockpit featuring side-by-side seats and a conventional firewall-forward engine installation with either a Walter Mikron IIIAE four-cylinder inverted inline engine or a Limbach L2000.

Aerotechnik L-13 SE Vivat
Aerotechnik L-13 SW Vivat
Aerotechnik L 13 SEH Vivat
Aerotechnik L-13 SDM Vivat
Aerotechnik L 13 SL Vivat
Aerotechnik L-13 SDL Vivat

== Operators ==
The Blanik has been owned and operated by individuals and gliding schools around the world. Some individuals club together to form syndicates to operate the aircraft. A small number have been operated by the military.

=== Military operators ===
Australia

- Australian Defence Force - Australian Defence Force Cadets 10 operated between 1961 and 2020

Estonia

- Estonian Air Force two operated between 1998 and 2005

Italy
Italian Air Force operated 2 LET L-13 Blaník from 1977 until 1999
Lithuania

- Lithuanian National Defence Volunteer Forces - 14 Blanik's operated in National Defence Volunteer Forces (SKAT) since 1993 up to 1998

Soviet Union

- Soviet Air Force

Spain

- Spanish Air Force

United States
United States Air Force Academy from 2002 until 2012.
Uruguay
Uruguayan Air Force

== Aircraft on display ==
- An L-13 is on display at the Museo del Aire in Madrid.
- An L-13 is on display at the Aviation History and Technology Center in Marietta, Georgia.
- An L-13 is on display at Atomic Motors Classic Cars and Motorcycles in Henderson, NV
- An L-13 is on display at the Propeller Cafe at Chofu Airport in Tokyo, Japan
- An L-13 is on display in Lithuanian Aviation Museum in Kaunas, Lithuania
- Kbely Aviation Museum has L-13 OK-4835 on display and the prototype OK-6201 in storage.

== Specifications (L-13 Blaník) ==
Data from The World's Sailplanes:Die Segelflugzeuge der Welt:Les Planeurs du Monde Volume II

General characteristics

- Crew: 2
- Length: 8.4 m (27 ft 7 in)
- Wingspan: 16.2 m (53 ft 2 in)
- Wing area: 19.15 m^{2} (206.1 sq ft)
- Aspect ratio: 13.7
- Airfoil: Root: NACA 65_{2}A 615, Tip: NACA 65_{2}A 612
- Empty weight: 292 kg (644 lb) equipped
- Gross weight: 500 kg (1,102 lb)

Performance

- Stall speed: 62 km/h (39 mph, 33 kn) (flaps 0°), 56 km/h (35 mph; 30 kn) (flaps 10°)
- Never exceed speed: 240 km/h (150 mph, 130 kn)
- Rough air speed max: 145 km/h (90 mph; 78 kn)
- Aerotow speed: 140 km/h (87 mph; 76 kn)
- Winch launch speed: 100 km/h (62 mph; 54 kn)
- Terminal velocity: with full airbrakes 258 km/h (160 mph; 139 kn)
- g limits: +5 -2.5 at 136 km/h (85 mph; 73 kn)
- Maximum glide ratio: 28 at 93 km/h (58 mph; 50 kn)
- Rate of sink: 0.84 m/s (165 ft/min) at 83 km/h (52 mph; 45 kn)
- Wing loading: 26.1 kg/m^{2} (5.3 lb/sq ft)

== See also ==
Related development

- L-23 Super Blanik
- L-33 Solo
- LET TG-10

Related lists

- List of gliders
- List of military aircraft of the United States
