= LET TG-10 =

TG-10
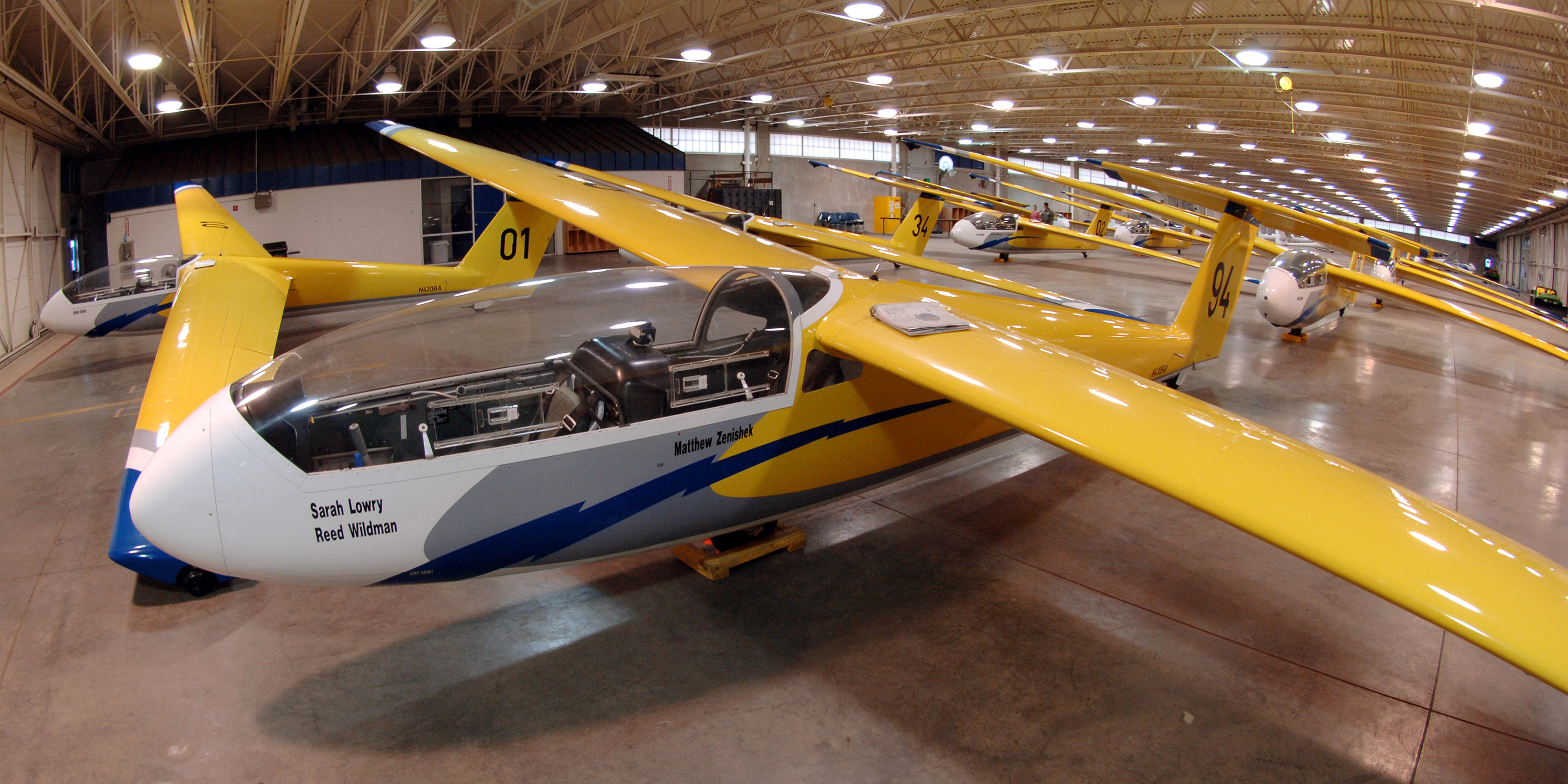
- TG-10B gliders at the U.S. Air Force Academy

General information
- Type: Training glider
- Manufacturer: Let Kunovice
- Designer: Karel Dlouhý
- Primary user: United States Air Force
- Number built: 21

History
- Introduction date: 2002
- Retired: 2012
- Developed from: LET L-13 Blaník

The TG-10 is the military designation for the Blaník, Super Blaník and Blaník L-33 Solo Czechoslovak sailplanes used for basic flight training at the United States Air Force Academy. The academy maintained an inventory of 21 TG-10s, in these three variants, until 2012. The aircraft were flown by cadets and officers of the 94th Flying Training Squadron, 306th Flying Training Group, Nineteenth Air Force, Air Education and Training Command.

== Variants ==
All of the TG-10 models are of aluminium semi-monocoque construction with fabric-covered control surfaces. All are equipped with full soaring instrument panels (altimeter, airspeed indicator, accelerometer, variometer, vertical velocity indicator, magnetic compass) and feature a full avionics suite (VHF radio, GPS, navigation computer, ELT).

TG-10B Merlin: LET L-23 Super Blaník. 12 in inventory. Basic trainer; 2-seat tandem configuration. Used in the academy's Soar For All Program and for training cadets to become glider instructor pilots. Four of them have been configured for high altitude wave soaring.

TG-10C Kestrel/"Saber": LET L-13AC Blaník. 5 in inventory. Advanced trainer; cockpit and controls are identical to the Merlin making transitions between the two aircraft very seamless. Used for aerobatics and spin training. Slightly heavier with shorter wingspan and conventional tail configuration offers slightly faster dynamic response to control inputs.

TG-10D Peregrine/"Thunder": Let L-33 Solo. 4 in inventory. Advanced trainer; single seater. Cockpit and controls are similar to TG-10B. Used for advanced cross country and wave soaring training.

In 2007 the Air Force Academy began retiring the TG-10D sailplanes in favor of the newer high-performance gliders, the Schempp-Hirth Duo Discus and Discus 2b, designated the TG-15A (tandem two-seater) and TG-15B (single seat). In 2011, the Air Force Academy began retiring its remaining TG-10B and TG-10C gliders. Both variants have been replaced by the TG-16A.

== History ==
The academy used the older, very reliable TG-4 gliders (Schweizer SGS 2-33) until 2002, when it replaced them with the newer TG-10. Until 2004, sailplane operations were conducted by the 94th Flying Training Squadron under the 34th Operations Group, a unit of the 34th Training Wing, United States Air Force Academy. In 2004, the 94th as well as other operations units at the academy (98th and 557th) realigned under Air Education and Training Command.

== See also ==
- List of gliders
