= DG Flugzeugbau DG-1000 =

German two-seat motor glider, 2000

DG-1000
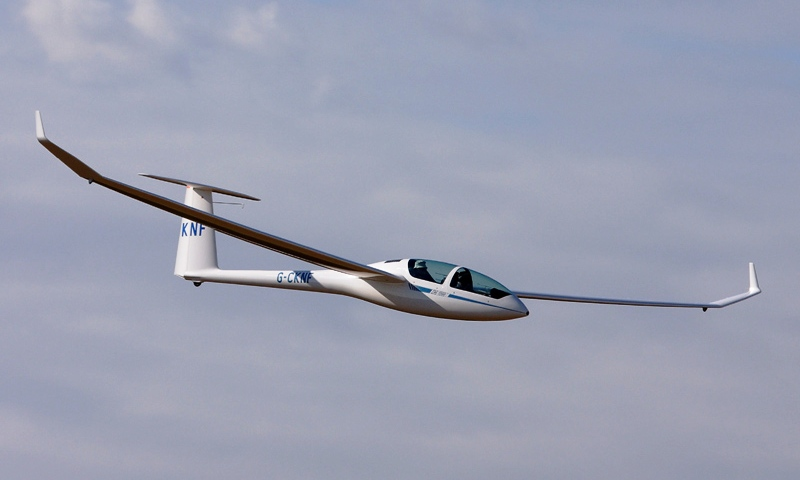
- DG-1000 with 20-metre wingspan.

General information
- Type: Two-Seater Class sailplane
- National origin: Germany
- Manufacturer: DG Flugzeugbau

History
- First flight: July 2000

The DG Flugzeugbau DG-1000 is a two-seater class glider built by DG Flugzeugbau. It first flew in July 2000 at Speyer in Germany. There are four models, with 18- and 20-metre wings of HQK-51 profile. The latest DG-1001 variant replaced the DG-505 in production.

With an 18 m (59 ft) wingspan, it is fully certified for aerobatics (+7 5 g); with a 20 m (66 ft) wingspan, it is certified for limited aerobatics (+5 −2.65 g).

The engine (DG1000T) is mounted on a pylon aft of the double cockpit. There is a reduction gear (2.3:1.0) between the engine and the two-blade carbon-fibre composite propeller. The propeller was designed by and made in the DG factory.

== Operational history ==
In 2011, the DG-1000 was selected by the USAF as a replacement for the Blanik TG-10. It will serve as a basic soaring trainer for cadets at the United States Air Force Academy. It also serves as the primary competition platform for the USAF Academy Aerobatic Demonstration Team. Its USAF designation is TG-16A.

== Variants ==
DG-1000S
Basic unpowered variant, tandem gear configuration, with provisions for a retractable landing gear.
DG-1000T
Retractable pylon-mounted engine, aft of the cockpit, with a 2.3:1 reduction gear driving a two-blade carbon-fibre composite propeller, designed and produced by DG.
DG-1001
Refined version with electric landing gear retraction.
DG-1001e neo
fitted with front electric sustainer – due to fly 2020.
TG-16A
USAF designation. Used to train cadets in soaring at the United States Air Force Academy, replacing the LET TG-10 Blanik.
Akaflieg Karlsruhe AK-9 or
A 0.400 kN (90 lbf) turbojet engine was installed in a two seater DG-1000. In Cooperation with the Institute for Thermal Flowengines at the KIT the behavior of the AMT Titan turbojet, from Dutch producer Draline, was researched, improved and fitted with an exhaust attenuator.
DG-1000J:also known as 'Akaflieg Karlsruhe AK-9', registered D-KAKJ, named "Jet".

== Operators ==
=== Military ===
Australia

- Royal Australian Air Force
  - Australian Air Force Cadets – 8

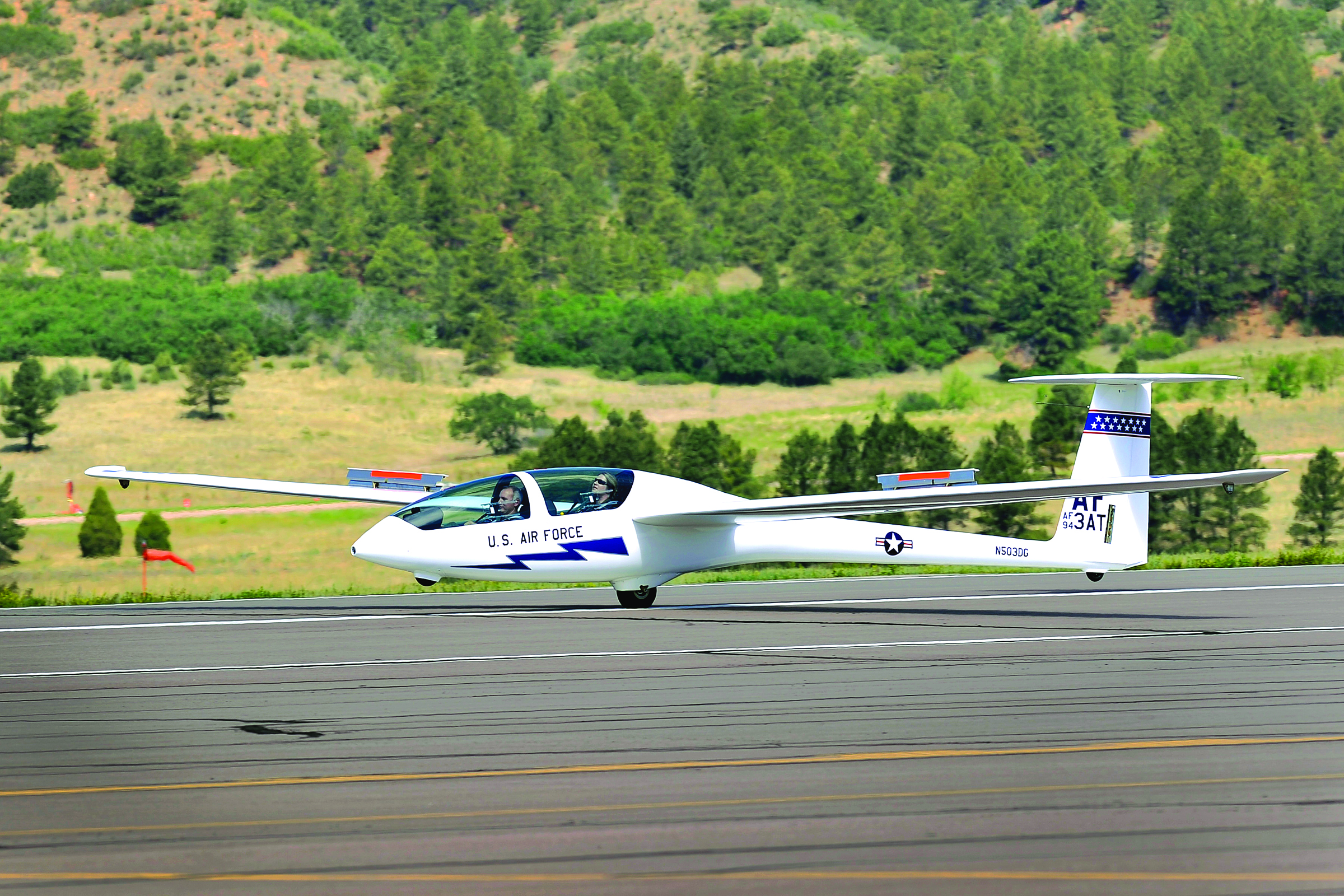
A U.S. Air Force Academy TG-16A

France

- Armée de l'Air et de l'Espace
  - École de l'air et de l'espace - 1

Indonesia

- Indonesian Air Force
  - Indonesian Air Force Academy – 3

United States

- United States Air Force Academy
  - 94th Flying Training Squadron

== Specifications (DG1000T) ==
Data from

General characteristics

- Crew: 2
- Capacity: 160 kg (353 lb) of water ballast
- Length: 8.57 m (28 ft 1 in)
- Wingspan: 18 m (59 ft 1 in) with 20m option available
- Height: 1.6 m (5 ft 3 in)
- Wing area: 17.5 m^{2} (188 sq ft)
- Aspect ratio: 22.8
- Airfoil: HQK-51, designed by DLR Braunschweig
- Empty weight: 461 kg (1,016 lb)
- Max takeoff weight: 750 kg (1,653 lb)
- Propellers: 2-bladed DG fixed-pitch propeller

Performance

- Maximum speed: 270 km/h (170 mph, 150 kn)
- Cruise speed: 111 km/h (69 mph, 60 kn)
- Stall speed: 68 km/h (42 mph, 37 kn) with 20m extension
- Never exceed speed: 270 km/h (170 mph, 150 kn)
- g limits: +7, −5
- Maximum glide ratio: 46.5
- Rate of climb: 1.3 m/s (260 ft/min) (engine on, still air)
- Rate of sink: 0.61 m/s (120 ft/min) (engine off and retracted)
- Wing loading: 32 kg/m^{2} (6.6 lb/sq ft) (with 80kg payload)

== Sources ==
- DG-Flugzeugbau website
- Specification
- DG-1000 The New Two Seater from DG Flugzeugbau
