= Omnipol =

Czech defence and aerospace company

- Industry: Aerospace; Defence; Electronics
- Founded: 1934; 92 years ago
- Headquarters: Prague, Czech Republic
- Revenue: CZK 10.07 billion (2024)
- Operating income: CZK 856.9 million (2024)
- Net income: CZK 1.44 billion (2024)
- Total assets: CZK 13.99 billion (2024)
- Number of employees: c. 4,000 (group)
- Website: www.omnipolgroup.cz/en

Omnipol is a Czech aerospace and defence group based in Prague. Omnipol owns Aircraft Industries, the maker of L-410 transport aircraft. It also owns ERA and MESIT, whose products include surveillance systems, aircraft instruments and communications equipment, and is a minority shareholder in Aero Vodochody.

Škoda Works established Omnipol as a trading company in 1934. Under state ownership, Omnipol exported Czechoslovak aircraft and weapons to the Eastern Bloc and the Middle East. It also imported aircraft for Czechoslovak Airlines. It was privatised in the 1990s and has since acquired several Czech aerospace and defence companies.

== International sales ==
Omnipol supplies aircraft, surveillance systems and communications equipment to overseas customers. Its aircraft sales can also include pilot and ground crew training, spare parts and maintenance support.

In 2021, Omnipol arranged the sale of 12 Aero L-39NG jet trainers to Vietnam’s Ministry of National Defence. The contract also provided for training Vietnamese pilots, instructors and ground crews, as well as spare parts, training equipment and logistics support. Aero Vodochody and Omnipol announced completion of the aircraft deliveries in March 2025.

The group also sells L-410 transport aircraft through its subsidiary Aircraft Industries. In June 2024, Aircraft Industries signed an agreement to supply an L-410 NG to the Chilean airline Aerocardal. By March 2026, Aerocardal had received three aircraft. The following month, the companies signed a memorandum to establish an authorised service centre in Chile, with maintenance, technical training and spare parts support for operators in Latin America.

In 2023, the Netherlands ordered four VERA-NG passive surveillance systems made by Omnipol’s subsidiary ERA for Ukraine, allocating €150 million to the purchase. ERA secured another order in 2024 to supply a VERA-NG system to Moldova. The Estonian Centre for Defence Investments arranged the procurement under the European Peace Facility.

== History ==
=== Origins and state ownership ===
Omnipol was founded in 1934 as a trading company within the Škoda Works group. It arranged barter transactions and developed a network of overseas offices to sell Škoda products. Its pre-war business was interrupted during the German occupation of Czechoslovakia and resumed after the Second World War, when its parent company was nationalised.

In 1953, Omnipol was assigned responsibility for imports and exports of aircraft and sporting weapons. A ministerial decree established Omnipol as a foreign trade enterprise on 1 April 1959, under the Ministry of Foreign Trade. Its remit included exclusive rights to import and export sporting and hunting weapons, ammunition, and sporting and civil aircraft.

Omnipol sold Aero L-39 trainers and Let L-410 transport aircraft abroad during the communist period. Its exports also included spare parts, airport equipment and other military equipment. It bought aircraft from foreign manufacturers for Czechoslovak Airlines. Its customers included countries outside the socialist bloc. In 1973, responsibility for sporting and hunting weapons and their ammunition passed to the foreign trade enterprise Merkuria.

=== Privatisation ===
Omnipol’s monopoly on aircraft imports and exports ended in 1990. Privatisation followed its reorganisation in 1991, with the state selling its last shares to Chemapol Group in 1996. Chemapol held an 87.5% stake by December 1997.

Chemapol sold its stake to C.H.M. in 1998. Renamed Omnyx in January 1999, the buyer came under the control of Richard Háva and other Omnipol managers. Omnyx took over Omnipol’s assets in 2004 and changed its name to Omnipol.

=== Industrial acquisitions and restructuring ===
In November 2011, Omnipol bought ERA from the American company SRA International. Based in Pardubice, ERA develops passive surveillance systems and equipment for air traffic management.

Omnipol became a strategic partner and co-investor in Aero Vodochody’s L-39NG aircraft programme in 2015. In 2018, it acquired control of MESIT, a manufacturer of aircraft instruments, communication systems and other specialised equipment based in Uherské Hradiště.

In September 2021, Omnipol became an indirect minority owner of Aero Vodochody when HSC Aerojet completed its purchase of the aircraft manufacturer from Penta Investments. Contemporary reporting put Omnipol’s interest in HSC Aerojet at 20%.

In 2022, Omnipol bought Aircraft Industries, the Kunovice-based manufacturer of L-410 transport aircraft, from its Russian owner.

In February 2026, Omnipol announced that its manufacturing and trading companies would become part of a new holding company, Omnipol Group. The restructuring was completed in June.

== Group companies ==
Omnipol Group’s principal subsidiaries include:

- Aircraft Industries — manufacturer of L-410 UVP-E20 and L-410 NG transport aircraft
- ERA — developer and manufacturer of passive surveillance systems and equipment for air traffic management
- MESIT — manufacturer of tactical communications equipment, aircraft instruments and specialised castings
- Omnipol Defence — responsible for integrating and exporting defence technologies
- Omnipol Airports — responsible for airport and heliport construction, modernisation and technical equipment

The group also holds a 24% interest in Aero Vodochody, which manufactures L-39 Skyfox jet trainers and L-159 aircraft.

== Semtex exports to Libya ==
Omnipol exported Semtex plastic explosive to Libya during the 1970s and early 1980s. The Libyan government subsequently supplied Semtex to the Provisional Irish Republican Army, which used it in its bombing campaign.

In 2011, iDNES.cz reported finding documents indicating that the last major supply contract with Libya was apparently signed in 1980. According to iDNES.cz, many documents had been destroyed, leaving the total amount exported unclear. A 2012 UN report described a shipment of Semtex seized in Niger the previous year from a convoy coming from Libya. The packaging referred to contracts signed in 1977 and 1980.
