= Avia M 332 =

1950s Czechoslovak piston aircraft engine

M 332
- Walter M 332 on display at the Polish Aviation Museum
- Type: four-cylinder inverted inline piston engine
- National origin: Czechoslovakia
- Manufacturer: Walter Aircraft Engines/Avia/LOM
- Designer: Bohumil Šimůnek
- Major applications: Aero 145; Orličan L-40 Meta Sokol

The Avia M 332 (originally known as the Walter M332) is an air-cooled four-cylinder inverted inline engine. It was designed by Bohumil Šimůnek, of Motorlet Walter Aircraft Engines, as a more powerful replacement for the four-cylinder Walter Minor engine, going into production in 1958. Piston aircraft engine production was transferred from Walter to Avia in 1964, the engine becoming the Avia M 332.

== Applications ==
- Aero 145
- Carlson Criquet
- Frontier MD-II
- Fry Esprit VFII
- Kharkov KhAI-24
- Orličan L-40 Meta Sokol
- Rolandas Kalinauskas RK-5 Ruth

== Specifications ==
Data from Jane's All The World's Aircraft 1971-72

=== General characteristics ===
- Type: 4-cylinder inverted air-cooled supercharged inline engine
- Bore: 105 mm (4.13 in)
- Stroke: 115 mm (4.53 in)
- Displacement: 3.98 L (247.9 in³)
- Length: 1,102 mm (43.4 in)
- Width: 425 mm (16.7 in)
- Height: 628 mm (24.7in)
- Dry weight: 102 kg (225 lb)

=== Components ===
- Valvetrain: two camshaft operated valves per cylinder, sodium filled exhaust valve
- Supercharger: Centrifugal
- Fuel system: Low pressure fuel injection
- Fuel type: Min 72 octane unleaded or 80 octane leaded
- Oil system: Dry sump pressure feed
- Cooling system: Air-cooling

=== Performance ===
- Power output: 104 kW (140 hp) at 2,700 rpm (take-off)

== See also ==
Related lists

- List of aircraft engines
