= LET L-23 Super Blaník =

Training glider

L-23 Super Blaník
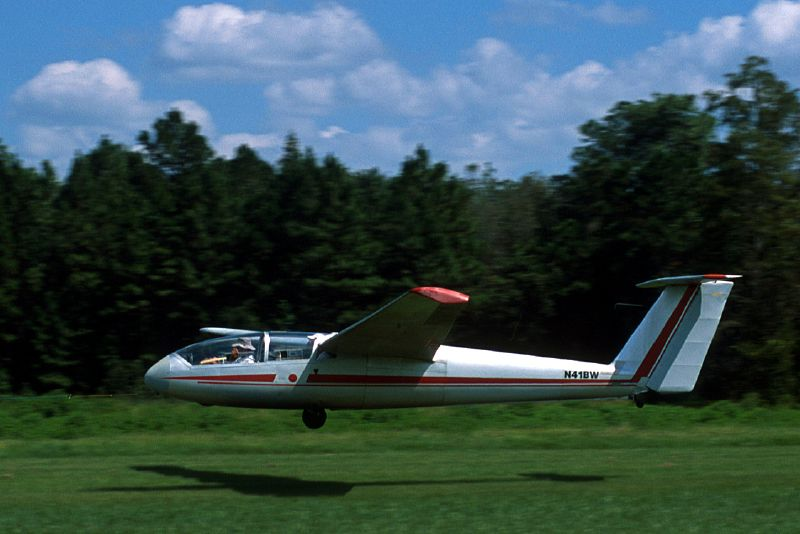

General information
- Type: Two-seat sailplane
- National origin: Czechoslovakia
- Manufacturer: Let Kunovice

History
- First flight: 1988
- Developed from: LET L-13 Blanik

The LET L-23 Super Blaník is a two-seat, all-metal structure glider with fabric covered control surfaces. The aircraft is primarily used for flight training; its single-seat sister model is the Let L-33 Solo.

== Design and development ==
The Super Blaník is an improved version of the original LET L-13 Blanik. The cockpit is somewhat roomier in the L-23, and some differences are a swept fin and a T-tail, and on the L-23 flaps were deleted to save weight since they were rarely used on the LET L-13. The airbrakes were retained however, and these open on both the top and the bottom of each wing. LET also moved the tailplane to the top of the vertical stabilizer for better protection in case of an outlanding. It also has a new instrument suite.

The aircraft has a two-piece canopy, where the front part opens to the right, and the rear part opens upwards and to the rear. This was done to improve vision compared to the L-13. From serial No. 968401 it was delivered with a one-piece canopy, that opens to the right only (with a very small canopy section opening to the rear at the wing root). The maximum number of occupants is two. If it is to be flown solo, the pilot must be sitting in the front seat and his weight (including parachute and ballast) must be at least 70 kg (154 lb). If the pilot's weight is less than 70 kg (154 lb), it is necessary to use ballast to bring the total weight in the front above the required limits. A weighted seat weighing 15 kg (33 lb) is available to replace the soft seat cushion bottom in the front seat.

The United States Air Force Auxiliary Civil Air Patrol uses the L-23 as a trainer for cadets.

Blanik Aircraft CZ s.r.o. plans a new version of the L-23, the L23NG (New Generation), with winglets and slightly higher performance (L/D ratio: 31). It will have an improved fuselage and one-piece canopy.

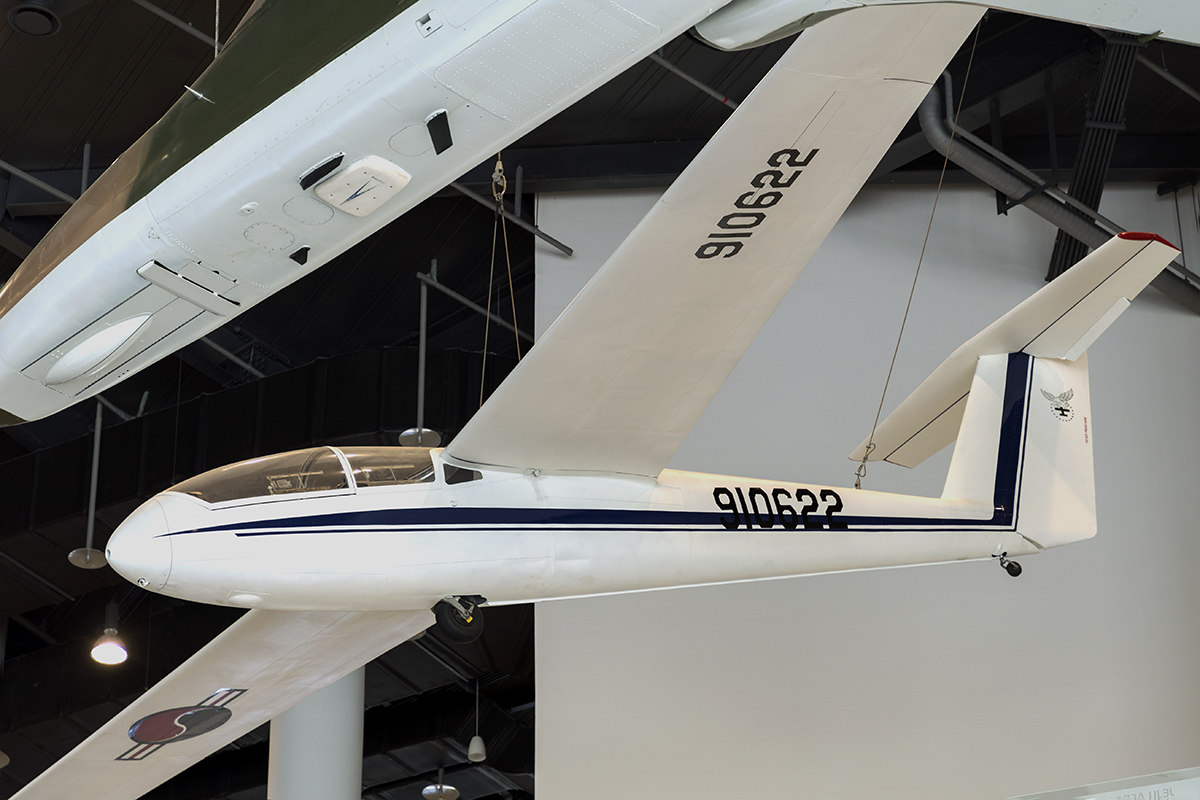
Super Blanik on display at Jeju Aerospace Museum

== Variants ==
L-23 Super Blaník
Original variant
L23NG
"New Generation" variant with winglets, an improved fuselage, and a one-piece canopy.
TZ-23
Brazilian Air Force designation of the L-23.

== Specifications ==
Data from Jane's All The World's Aircraft 1988–89

General characteristics

- Crew: 2
- Length: 8.5 m (27 ft 11 in)
- Wingspan: 16.2 m (53 ft 2 in)
- Height: 1.9 m (6 ft 3 in)
- Wing area: 19.15 m^{2} (206.1 sq ft)
- Airfoil: root: NACA 63_{2}A-615; tip:NACA 63_{2}A-612
- Empty weight: 310 kg (683 lb)
- Max takeoff weight: 510 kg (1,124 lb) dual

Performance

- Stall speed: 56 km/h (35 mph, 30 kn) at max t/o weight dual
- Never exceed speed: 256 km/h (159 mph, 138 kn) in smooth air at max t/o weight dual

160 km/h (86 kn; 99 mph) in rough air
150 km/h (81 kn; 93 mph) on aero-tow
120 km/h (65 kn; 75 mph) on winch launch
130 km/h (70 kn; 81 mph) flaps extended

- g limits: +5.3 -1.5 at max t/o weight dual, +6 -3 at max t/o weight solo
- Maximum glide ratio: 28 at 90 km/h (49 kn; 56 mph) at max t/o weight dual
- Rate of sink: 0.82 m/s (161 ft/min) at 80 km/h (43 kn; 50 mph) at max t/o weight dual
- Wing loading: 26.63 kg/m^{2} (5.45 lb/sq ft) max dual

== See also ==
Related development

- LET L-13 Blaník
- L-33 Solo
- LET TG-10

Related lists

- List of gliders
