= Fry Esprit VFII =

Swiss homebuilt aircraft

Esprit VFII
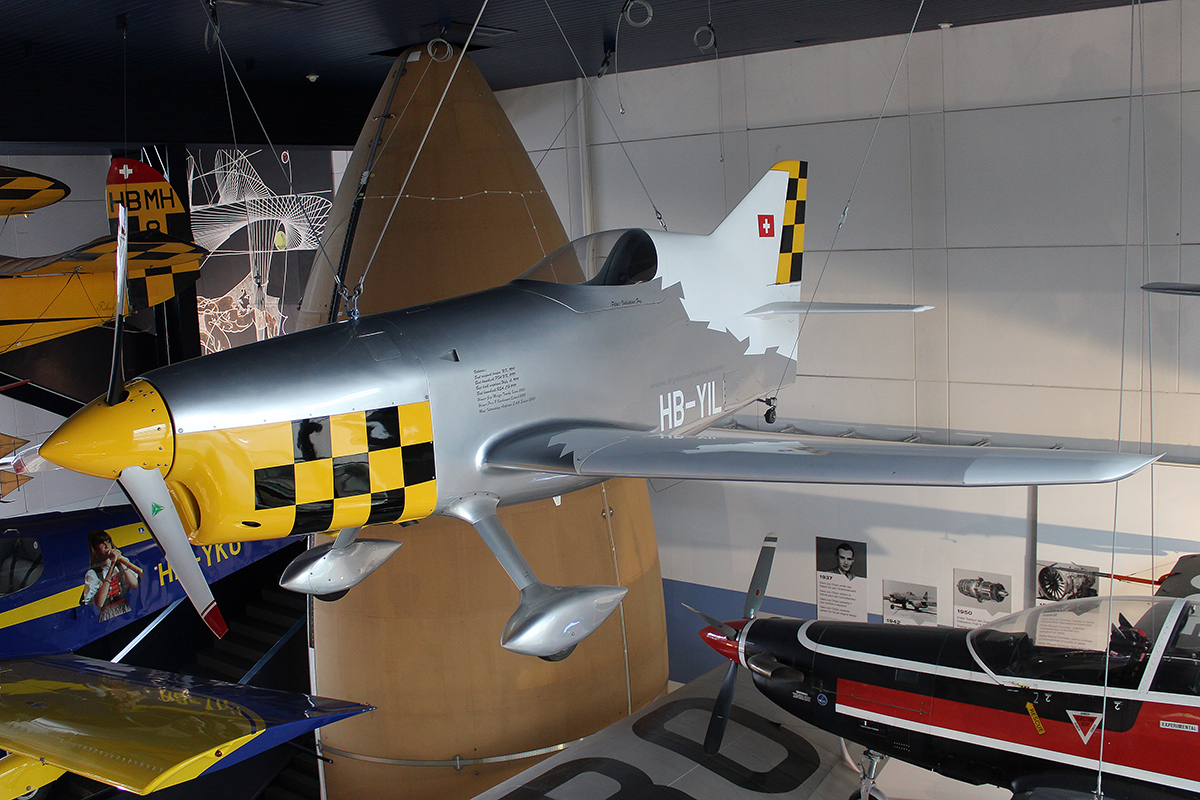
- Fry Esprit VFII at the Swiss Museum of Transport

General information
- Type: Amateur-built aircraft
- National origin: Switzerland
- Manufacturer: Fry Aircraft Design
- Designer: Valentino Fry
- Status: Plans available (2015)

The Fry Esprit VFII is a Swiss amateur-built aircraft, designed by Valentino Fry and produced by Fry Aircraft Design of Wilen bei Wollerau. The aircraft is supplied as plans for amateur construction.

== Design and development ==
The Esprit VFII features a cantilever low-wing, a single-seat enclosed cockpit under a bubble canopy, fixed conventional landing gear with wheel pants and a single engine in tractor configuration.

The aircraft is of carbon fibre composite construction. Its 6.09 m (20.0 ft) span Burt Rutan-designed wing has an area of 6.07 m^{2} (65.3 sq ft) and unidirectional carbon-fibre spars. The recommended engines are the 140 hp (104 kW) Walter Minor and the turbocharged 140 hp (104 kW) Lom Praha four-stroke powerplants. The Esprit has a cruise speed of 343 km/h (213 mph).

== Specifications (Esprit VFII) ==
Data from Bayerl and Tacke

General characteristics

- Crew: one
- Wingspan: 6.09 m (20 ft 0 in)
- Wing area: 6.07 m^{2} (65.3 sq ft)
- Empty weight: 358 kg (789 lb)
- Gross weight: 490 kg (1,080 lb)
- Fuel capacity: 65 litres (14 imp gal; 17 US gal)
- Powerplant: 1 × Walter Minor six cylinder, inline air-cooled, four stroke aircraft engine, 100 kW (140 hp)
- Propellers: 3-bladed composite

Performance

- Maximum speed: 389 km/h (242 mph, 210 kn)
- Cruise speed: 343 km/h (213 mph, 185 kn)
- Stall speed: 100 km/h (62 mph, 54 kn)
- Rate of climb: 9 m/s (1,800 ft/min)
- Wing loading: 80.7 kg/m^{2} (16.5 lb/sq ft)
