= Aircraft Industries =

Czech civil aircraft manufacturer

Let
- Type: Privately held company
- Industry: Aerospace
- Founded: 1936
- Headquarters: Kunovice, Czech Republic
- Products: Light aircraft, gliders, airliners
- Revenue: 2,266,417,000 Czech koruna (2020)
- Operating income: 340,900,000 Czech koruna (2020)
- Net income: 271,024,000 Czech koruna (2020)
- Total assets: 3,068,497,000 Czech koruna (2020)
- Owner: Omnipol
- Number of employees: 1,085 (2020)
- Parent: Ayres Corporation (1998–2001); Moravan (2001–2005); Aircraft Industries (2005–2008); UGMK (2008–2022); Omnipol (2022–present)
- Website: www.let.cz

Aircraft Industries, a.s., operating as Let, is a Czech (before December 1992 Czechoslovak) civil aircraft manufacturer. Its most successful design has been the L-410 Turbolet, of which more than 1300 units have been built. Its head office is in Kunovice, Zlín Region. Let was owned by the Russian company UGMK from 2008 to 2022, when it was acquired by Czech-based Omnipol Group.

The company operates the sixth largest Czech airport and a private secondary school.

== History ==
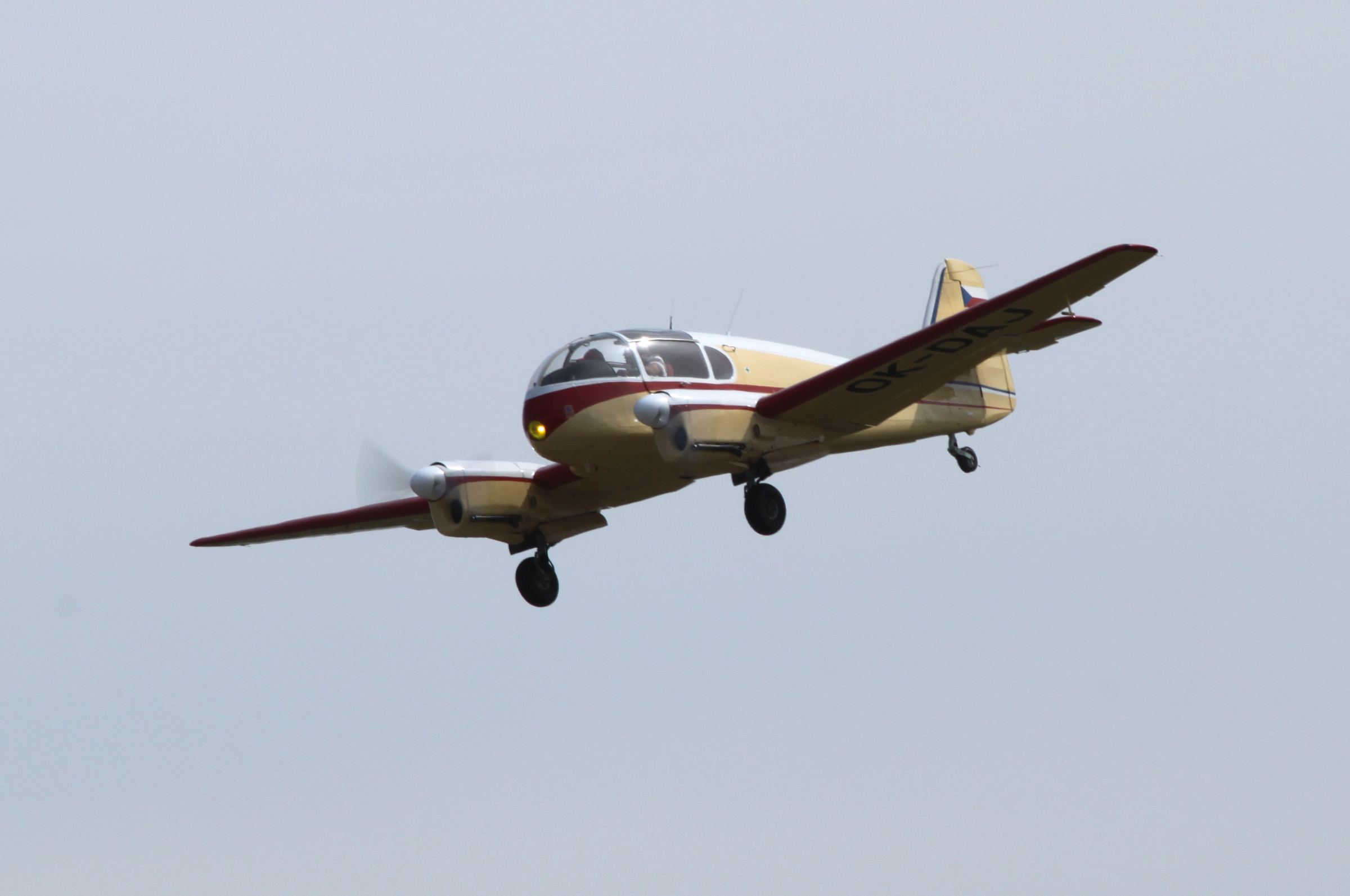
Aero 145 at CIAF airshow in Hradec Králové

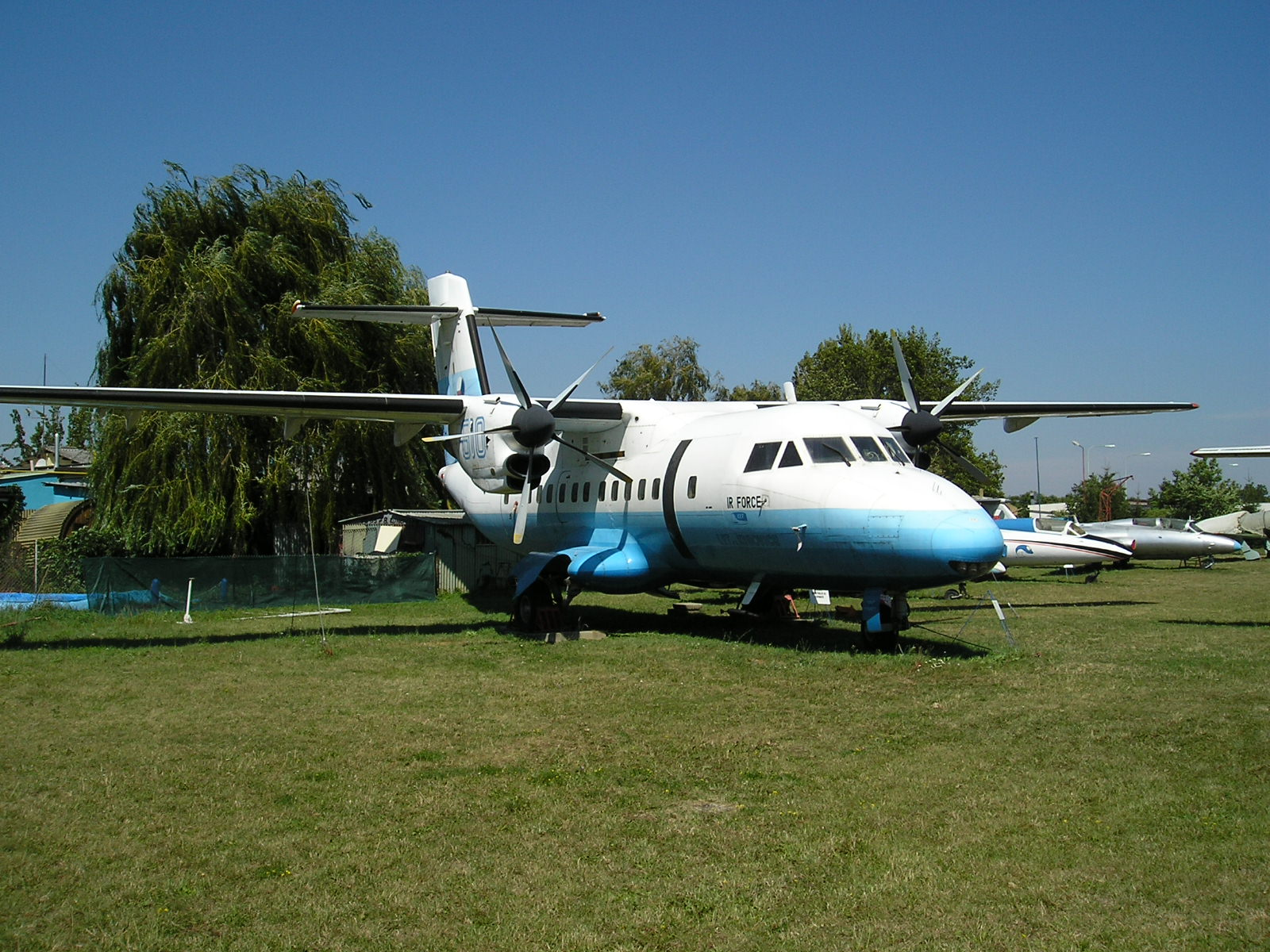
Let L-610 in Kunovice museum

Building of an aircraft factory in Kunovice started in 1936, as a part of the Škoda Works industrial concern. Before and during World War II the unfinished plant served only as a repair works. After the end of the war the factory was nationalized and in 1950–53 a new plant was built. In 1957–1967 it was named SPP (Strojírny první pětiletky – "Works of the First Five-year Plan"), and in 1967 it returned to the name LET. The works produced under licence were the Soviet trainers Yakovlev Yak-11 (under a designation C-11) and the Aero Ae 45 and Aero Ae 145 utility aircraft.

In 1957 the company began to develop the L-200 Morava light utility aircraft and four years later the Z-37 Cmelak agricultural aircraft, which were both a commercial success.

Over the years Let developed and produced gliders: Zlín 22, Z-124 Galánka, LF-109 Pionýr, and Z-425 Šohaj. However the most popular gliders produced by LET are the Blaníks: L-13 Blaník, L-23 Super Blaník and L-33 Solo.

During the 1960s Let's engineers developed a 19-seat commuter turboprop, the L-410 Turbolet, of which more than 1200 were produced. This popular aircraft went through a number of improvements and modernisations and the latest types, the L 410 UVP-E20 and L 420 are EASA and FAA certified respectively.

The largest Czech transport aircraft, the Let L-610, was produced in 1988 in prototype form and displayed at the Paris Airshow. Production was cancelled due to lack of funding. There were eight prototypes made in the factory.

The all-metal Blaník sailplane was produced in the largest quantities of any sailplane, with over 3,000 manufactured since the first rolled off the production line in 1958. In 2005 it was still in production as the L23 Super Blaník variant.

The company explored the possibility of a joint venture with Fairchild Aircraft in the 1990s, but eventually decided against it. However, it was later purchased by Ayres Corporation in 1998. In 2001, it merged with Moravan Aeroplanes. Following bankruptcy, it was purchased by Aircraft Industries in 2005.

The Ural Mining and Metallurgical Company (UGMK) purchased 51% of the company's shares in 2008; UAC had shown interest in acquiring the control of the company as well. UGMK purchased the remaining shares in 2013.

In April 2022, Aircraft Industries was acquired by the Prague-based company, Omnipol Group.

== Products ==
=== Powered aircraft ===
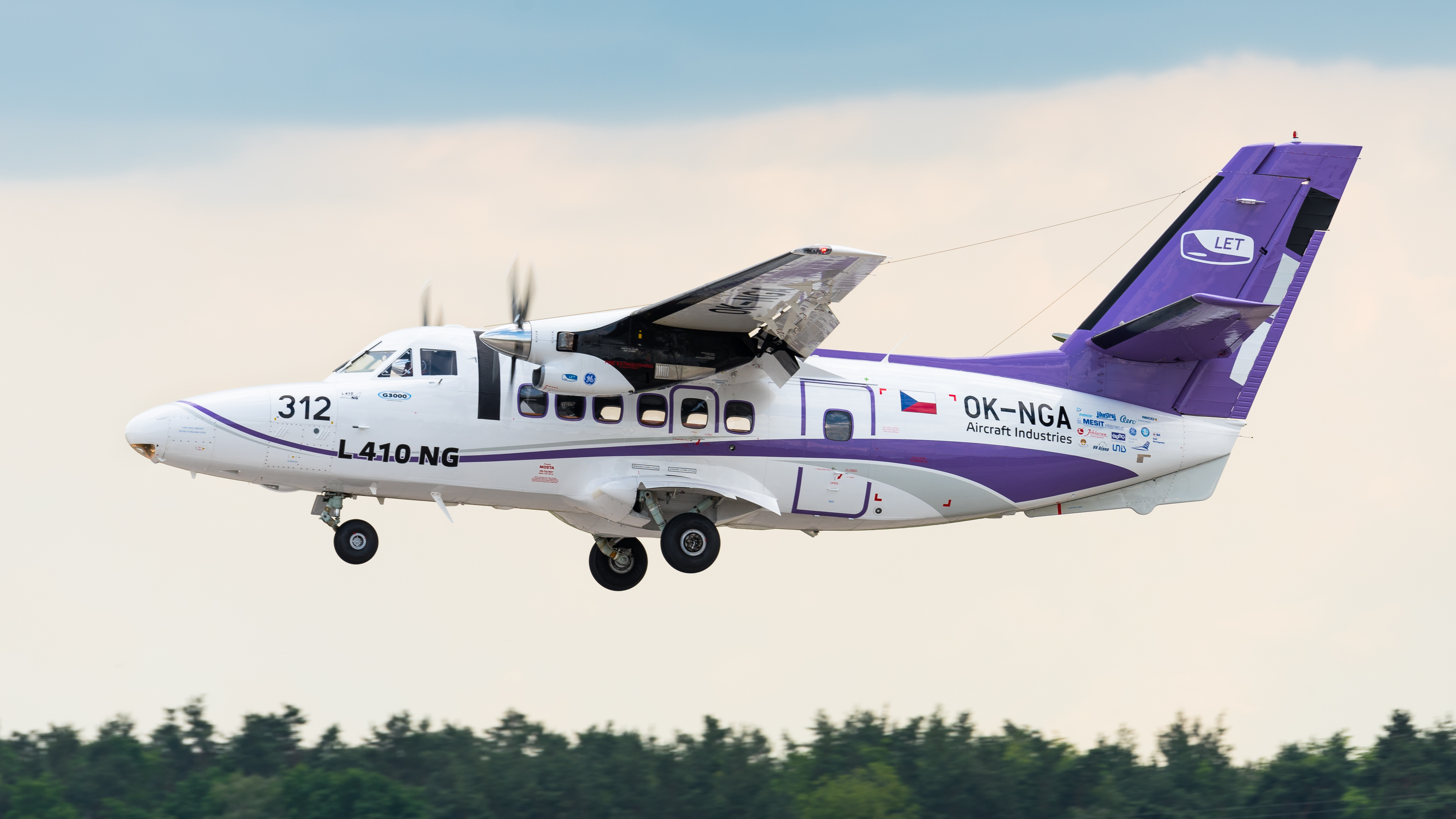
Let L-410 NG

Model name	First flight	Number built	Type
Let Ae-45S		228	Twin engine utility airplane; Aero Ae-45S built under license
Let Ae-145		162	Twin engine utility airplane; Aero Ae-145 built under license
Let C-11		707	Single engine trainer; Yakovlev Yak-11 built under license
Let E-33			An L-200 converted into a testbed for tails and boundary layer control
Let L-18			1955 twin-boom light-transport aircraft project
Let L-36			Low-wing agricultural aircraft project; abandoned for Zlin Z-37
Let L-110			1995 four-seat, all-metal low-wing light/touring monoplane project
Let L-145			Original designation for Ae-45S
Let L-200 Morava	1957	361	Twin engine utility airplane
Let L-210	1966	1	Six seat version of L-200 with M338 engines
Let L-300			Enlarged air taxi version of L-200 with 9-11 seats; only a project (1958)
Let L-400			1960s turboprop feederliner project; resembled a scaled-down An-24
Let L-410 Turbolet	1969	1,200+	Twin engine regional airliner
Aircraft Industries L 410 NG	2015		Upgraded version of the L-410UVP-E20
Let L-420 (I)			1960s commuterliner project; predecessor of L-410
Let L-420 (II)			1980s projected cargo freighter version of L-410
Let L-420			Westernized variant of L-410; upgraded L-410UVP-E
Let L-430			1990s projected stretched L-410 development
Let L-450			1990s projected L-410 replacement; redesignated L-510
Let L-500			1962 light aircraft studies
Let L-510 (I)			1965 low-wing two-seat trainer project
Let L-510 (II)	1966	1	1992 twin turboprop commuterliner project; intended as L-410 replacement
Let L-520			1960s low-wing four-seat tourer project; higher performance version of L-510
Let L-539			Single-engine business jet project; based on Aero L-39
Let L-540			1965 low-wing four-seat tourer project
Let L-542			1960s twin-engine light aircraft project
Let L-550			1965 low-wing four-seat tourer; economy model of L-540
Let L-600			1964 twinjet feederliner project; intended as Li-2 replacement
Let L-610	1988	6	Prototype twin engine transport airplane
Let L-614			1982 projected four-engine version of L-610
Let L-710			1993 "Boxplane" freighter based on L-610G parts
Let L-1000			1963 Smaragd (Emerald) jetliner project

=== Gliders ===
Model name	First flight	Number built	Type
Let L-13 Blaník	1956	3,000+	Two-seat, high-wing all-metal glider
Let L-21 Spartak	1958		High-wing, single-seat sailplane
Let L-23 Super Blaník	1988		L-13 derivative with two-piece canopy and T-tail
Let L-33 Solo	1992	94	Single-seat sailplane
Let L-113			1957 projected simplified version of L-13
Let L-213			1957 projected long-span version of L-13
Let LF-106			1940s single-seat training glider project; redesignated as LF-109
Let LF-109 Pionýr	1950	~470	Single-seat training glider
Let LF-110			1950s two-seat high-wing sailplane project; mixed construction counterpart to L-13
Let LF-113			two-seat high-wing sailplane project
Let LF-114 Standard	1956		Single-seat training glider
Let LF-209			1952 two-seat high-wing sailplane project
Let LF-309			Two-seat high-wing sailplane; as LF-209 but with longer span
Let LF-409			Two-seat training glider; LF-109 fuselage with a new wing
Let LF-509			Two-seat high-wing sailplane; as LF-209 but with trapezoidal wings
Let LP-110			1953 two-seat high-wing glider project; all-metal counterpart to L-13
Let TG-10	2002	21	US military designation for L-13, L-23 and L-33 gliders

== See also ==
- Aero Vodochody
- Avia
- Beneš-Mráz
- Letov Kbely
- Zlin Aircraft
