= Rolandas Kalinauskas RK-5 Ruth =

Lithuanian light aircraft

RK-5 Ruth

General information
- Type: Light aircraft
- National origin: Lithuania
- Manufacturer: Rolandas Kalinauskas
- Status: In production (2015)
- Number built: at least one

The Rolandas Kalinauskas RK-5 Ruth, also called the Viltis (English: hope), is a Lithuanian light aircraft, designed and produced by Rolandas Kalinauskas, of Prienai. The aircraft is supplied as a complete ready-to-fly-aircraft.

== Design and development ==
The RK-5 is derived from the Rolandas Kalinauskas RK-3 Wind. The RK-5 features a strut-braced high wing, a four-seat enclosed cabin accessed via doors, fixed tricycle landing gear and a single engine in tractor configuration.

The aircraft fuselage is made from welded steel tubing supplemented by wooden stringers, while the wing is of wooden structure, all covered in doped aircraft fabric. The 11 m (36.1 ft) span wing has an area of 15.2 m^{2} (164 sq ft) and mounts flaps. The wing is supported by a single strut on each side with a single jury strut. The standard engine employed is the 140 hp (104 kW) Avia M 332 four-cylinder, inverted, air-cooled, supercharged, inline, four-stroke powerplant.

The aircraft has an empty weight of 450 kg (990 lb) and a gross weight of 900 kg (2,000 lb), giving a useful load of 450 kg (990 lb). It is supplied with a wide range of standard equipment, including leather seats and tinted windows.

== Specifications (RK-5) ==
Data from Bayerl and Tacke

General characteristics

- Crew: one
- Capacity: three passengers
- Wingspan: 11 m (36 ft 1 in)
- Wing area: 15.2 m^{2} (164 sq ft)
- Empty weight: 450 kg (992 lb)
- Gross weight: 900 kg (1,984 lb)
- Fuel capacity: 130 litres (29 imp gal; 34 US gal)
- Powerplant: 1 × Avia M 332 four cylinder, inverted, air-cooled, supercharged, inline four-stroke aircraft engine, 100 kW (140 hp)
- Propellers: 2-bladed wooden, electrically adjustable, 1.8 m (5 ft 11 in) diameter

Performance

- Maximum speed: 230 km/h (140 mph, 120 kn)
- Cruise speed: 195 km/h (121 mph, 105 kn)
- Stall speed: 62 km/h (39 mph, 33 kn)
- Rate of climb: 4 m/s (790 ft/min)
- Wing loading: 59.2 kg/m^{2} (12.1 lb/sq ft)
