= Kharkiv KhAI-24 =

KhAI-24

General information
- Type: Autogyro
- National origin: Soviet Union
- Designer: Kharkiv Aviation Institute
- Number built: 1

The Kharkov KhAI-24 was a 1960s Soviet two-seat autogyro designed by the Kharkiv Aviation Institute.

== Design and development ==
The KhAI-24 was designed by students of the Kharkiv Aviation Institute for an Estonian Ministry for the Energy Industry competition for a light autogyro for power cable inspection. The two-seat autogyro had an enclosed cabin and a tricycle landing gear, it was powered by a 115 hp (86 kW) Walter M332 aircraft engine driving a tractor configuration two-bladed propeller. A three-bladed rotor was fitted above the cabin. A full-scale model was displayed in 1966 in Moscow and the autogyro was tested in 1967 but nothing else is known.

== Specifications ==
Data from The History of Soviet Aircraft from 1918

General characteristics

- Crew: 2
- Length: 7.8 m (25 ft 7 in)
- Max takeoff weight: 800 kg (1,764 lb)
- Powerplant: 1 × Walter M332 air-cooled four-cylinder inverted inline engine, 86 kW (115 hp)
- Main rotor diameter: 9.96 m (32 ft 8 in)
- Propellers: 2-bladed

Performance

- Maximum speed: 150 km/h (93 mph, 81 kn)
- Minimum control speed: 40 km/h (25 mph, 22 kn)
- Service ceiling: 2,200 m (7,200 ft)

== See also ==
Related lists

- List of rotorcraft
