= Aero Ae-45 =

Utility aircraft

Ae 45
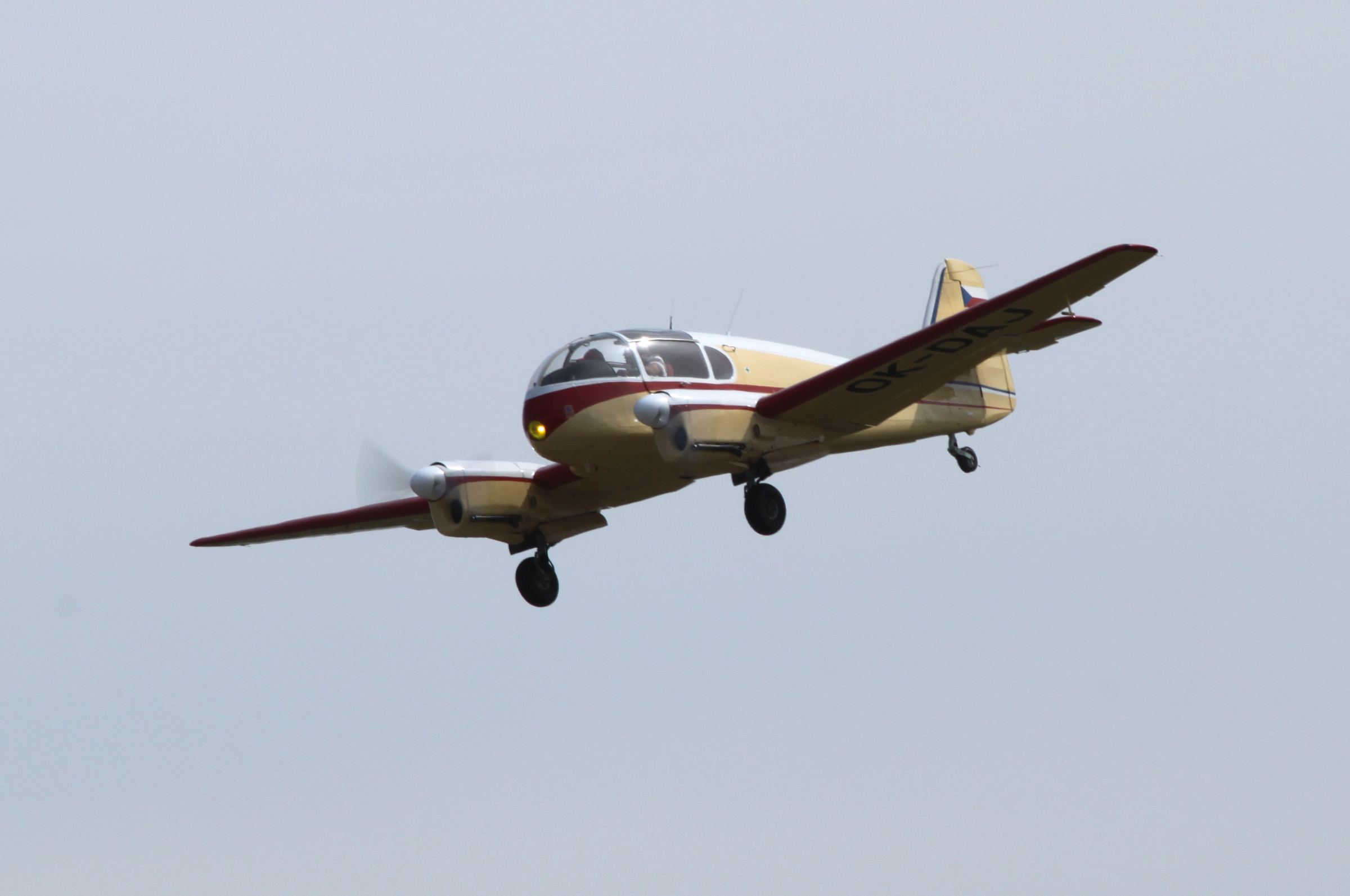
- Let Aero Ae 145

General information
- Type: Utility aircraft
- Manufacturer: Aero Vodochody, Let Kunovice
- Primary users: Czechoslovakia China, East Germany, France, Hungary, Italy, Poland, Romania, USSR and Switzerland
- Number built: 590

History
- Manufactured: 1947–1961
- First flight: 21 July 1947

The Aero 45 was a twin piston-engined civil utility aircraft produced in Czechoslovakia after World War II. Aero Vodochody produced the aircraft in 1947–1951, after which the Let Kunovice rolled out these planes until 1961. In 1958 the Ae-45S became the first Czechoslovak plane to cross the Atlantic Ocean. It was the first product of the nation's postwar aviation industry and proved a great success, with many of the 590 produced being exported.

The aircraft was developed into other variants, including the "Super Aero" and Ae 145.

== Design and development ==
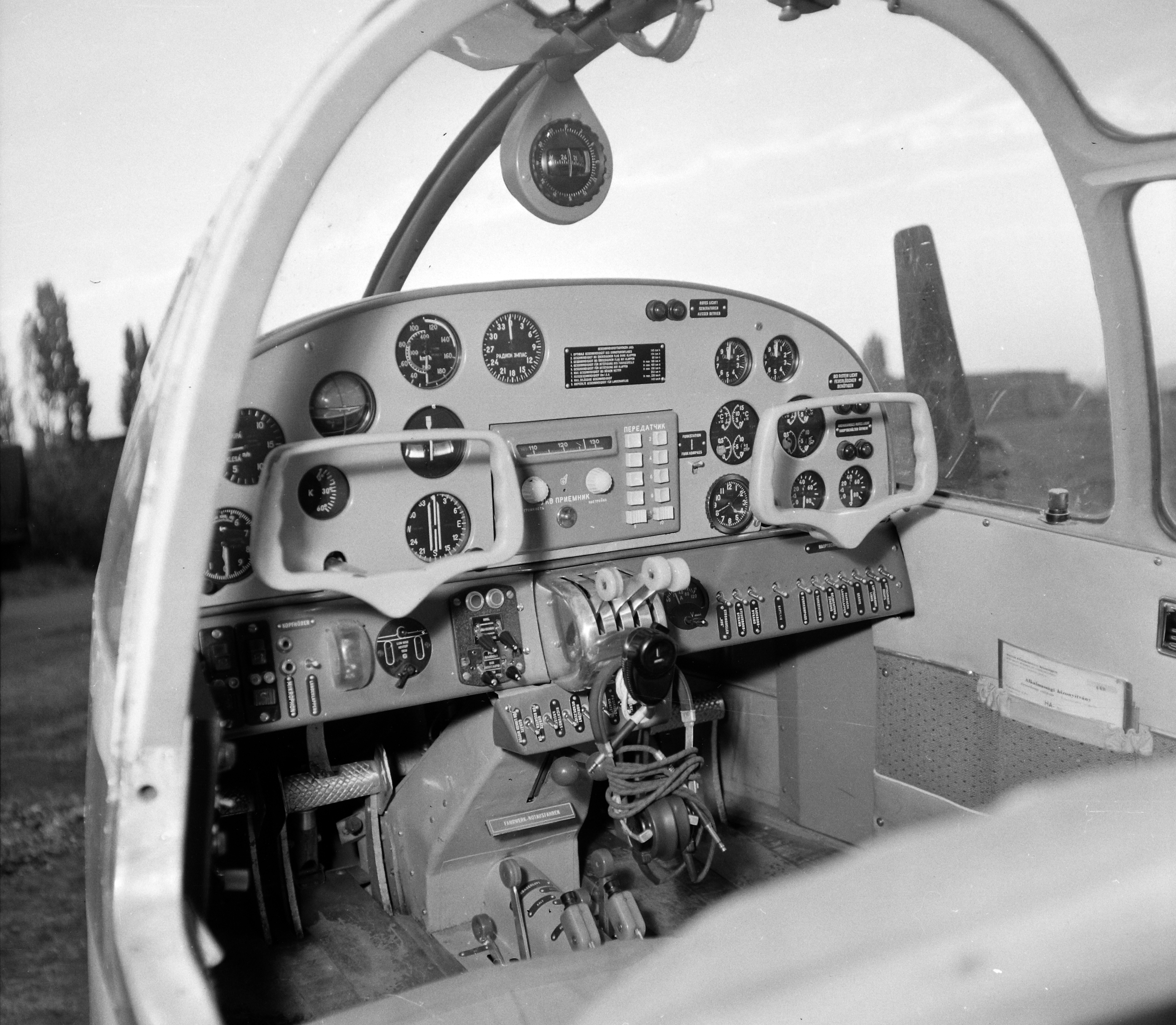
Cockpit of a Hungarian Ae-45

Following the end of the Second World War, Aero continued production of the German Siebel Si 204 transport and Bücker Bü 131 Jungmann to keep the factory occupied, while the factory's management showed little interest in developing new designs and planned to diversify into production of non-aviation products like toys and kitchen utensils. In 1945, a team of engineers led by Ondřej Němec and František Vik began work on a design of a four-seat twin-engined light aircraft suitable for use as a business aircraft, and as an air taxi, which was hoped would be attractive to both domestic and export customers. Work was done without permission of the company management, with the team working in their own time. A reorganisation of the company brought a new technical director at the Aero factory, who authorised production of a prototype, although higher management were still not informed. The prototype construction was well under way when the management finally found out about the Aero 45 and launched an investigation of the authorisation of the prototype, and demanded that the design calculations be rechecked. The prototype (registered OK-BCA) flew for the first time on 21 July 1947, with the second, registered OK-CCA, flying on 12 March 1948. After a successful programme of flight testing and a series of foreign demonstration tours by the two prototypes, the Aero 45 entered production, with the first production aircraft flying on 16 April 1949. The model number of "45" was not a continuation of Aero's pre-war numeration scheme, but a reference to the 4/5 seats in the aircraft.

=== Description ===
The design bears a superficial resemblance, when viewed nose-on, to the much larger German Siebel Si 204 which, among other German aircraft, was produced in Czechoslovakia under German occupation. The Aero 45 had a sleek, teardrop-shaped fuselage, with a rounded, extensively-glazed nose affording excellent visibility. It had a low wing on which the engine nacelles were mounted, and a conventional tail. The main undercarriage was retractable but the tailwheel was fixed.

== Operational history ==
Ae-45 prototypes were widely advertised abroad. In August 1949 Jan Anderle won the Norton Griffiths Race in Great Britain (Ae-45 registration OK-DCL). They also set several international records. As a result, apart from Eastern Bloc countries, the plane was also bought by Italy and Switzerland. On 10–11 August 1958 Dr. Pier Paolo Brielli flew an Italian Ae-45 3000 kilometers from South America to Dakar across the southern Atlantic (as the first Czechoslovak-built aircraft). In 1981 Jon Svensen flew Ae-45S from Europe to the USA.

This type was used in Czechoslovakia and was exported to the People's Republic of China, East Germany, France, Hungary, Italy, Poland, Romania, Soviet Union and Switzerland. Hungary was a major customer, where the aircraft was known as the Kócsag (Hungarian: "Egret").

== Variants ==
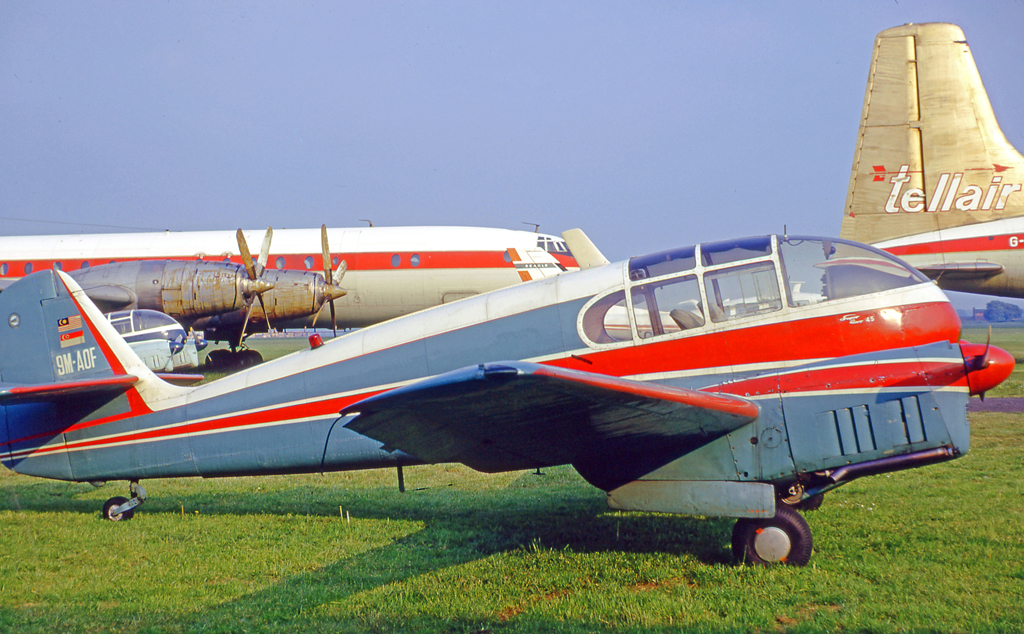
1957-built Aero 45S series II registered in Malaya

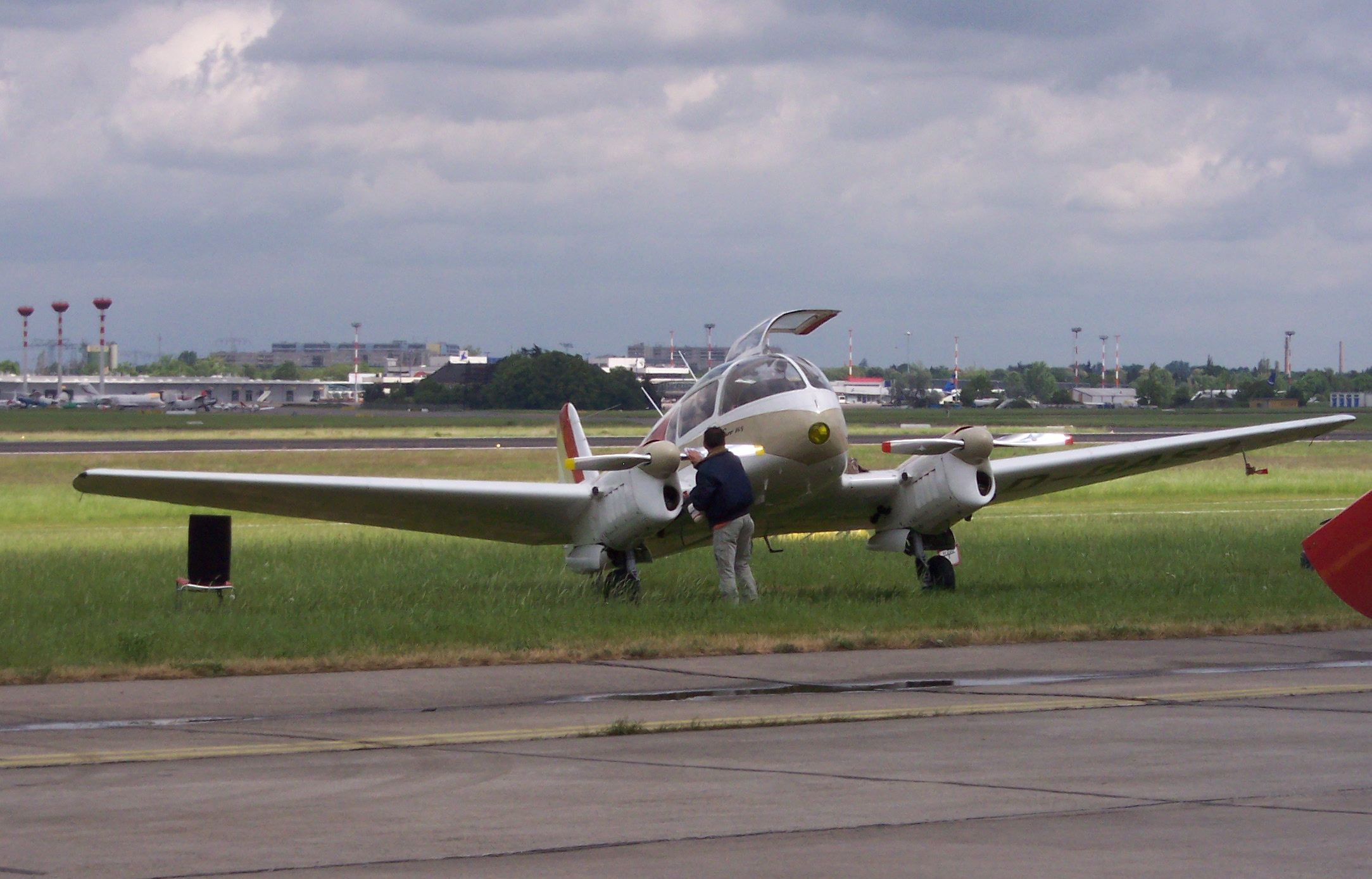
Let Aero Ae 145

Aero 45
First production version built in Aero factory. Powered by Walter Minor 4-III engines. 200 built between 1948 and 1951.
Aero 45S "Super Aero"
Improved variant produced by Let in Kunovice factory, among others with better navigational equipment. 228 aircraft built between 1954 and 1959.
Aero 145 (I)
Larger five-seat derivative of Ae-45 powered by Walter Minor 6-III engines and tricycle landing gear, not built.
Aero 145 (II)
Version with engines changed to supercharged Motorlet (Walter) M332, produced later as Avia M 332s. This version was developed and built by Let, 142 aircraft built.
Aero 245
Similar to 145, but with a tailwheel, not built.
Aero 345
Aero 45 airframe powered by Walter Minor 6-III engines, not built.
Sungari-1
Chinese unlicensed copy of the Aero Ae 45S, produced from 1958.

== Operators ==
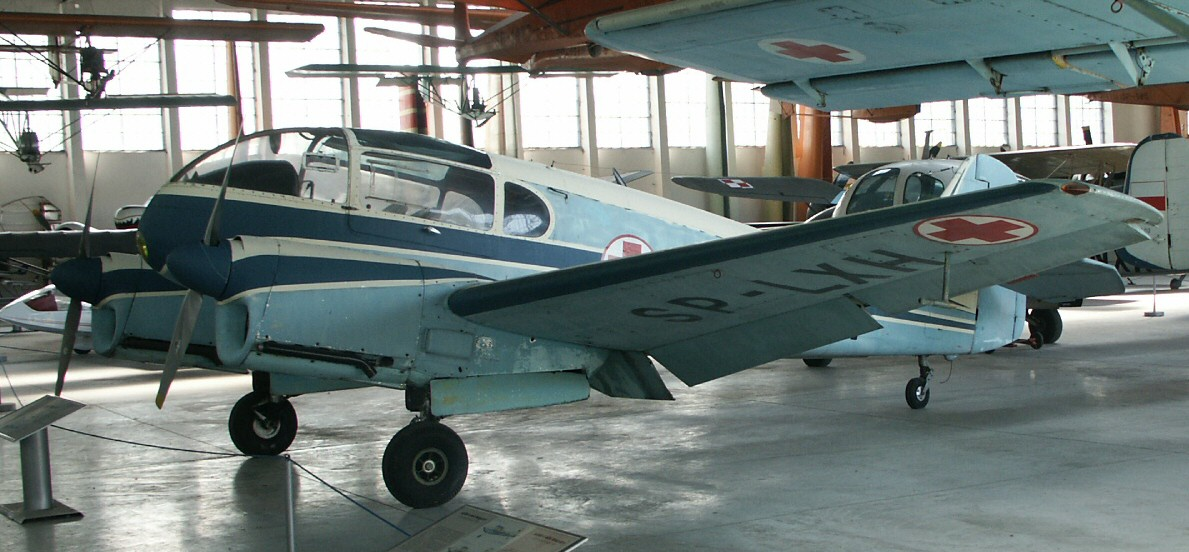
Aero Ae 145 used in Poland as an air ambulance, Polish Aviation Museum

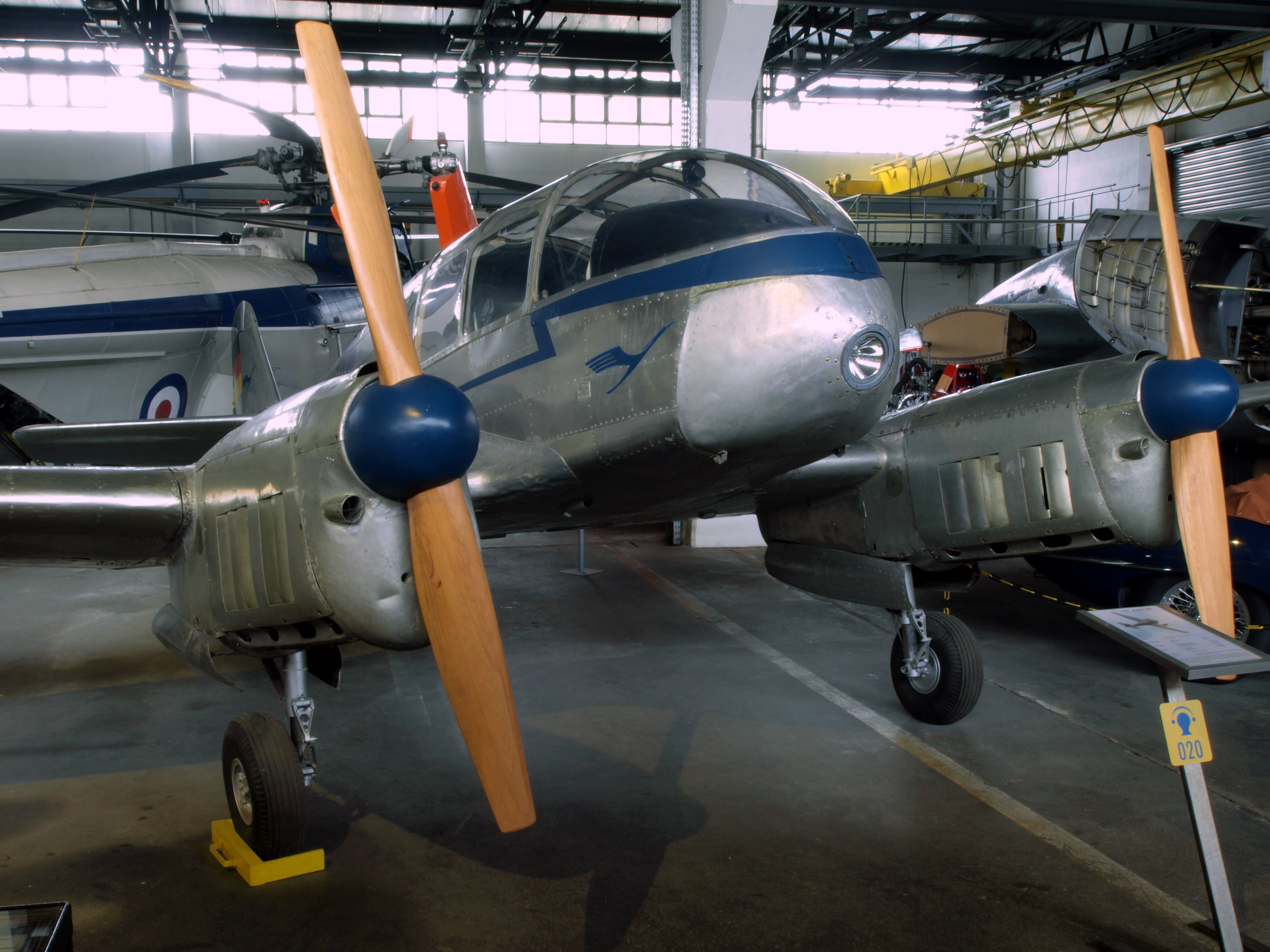
1948 Lufthansa LET Aero 45

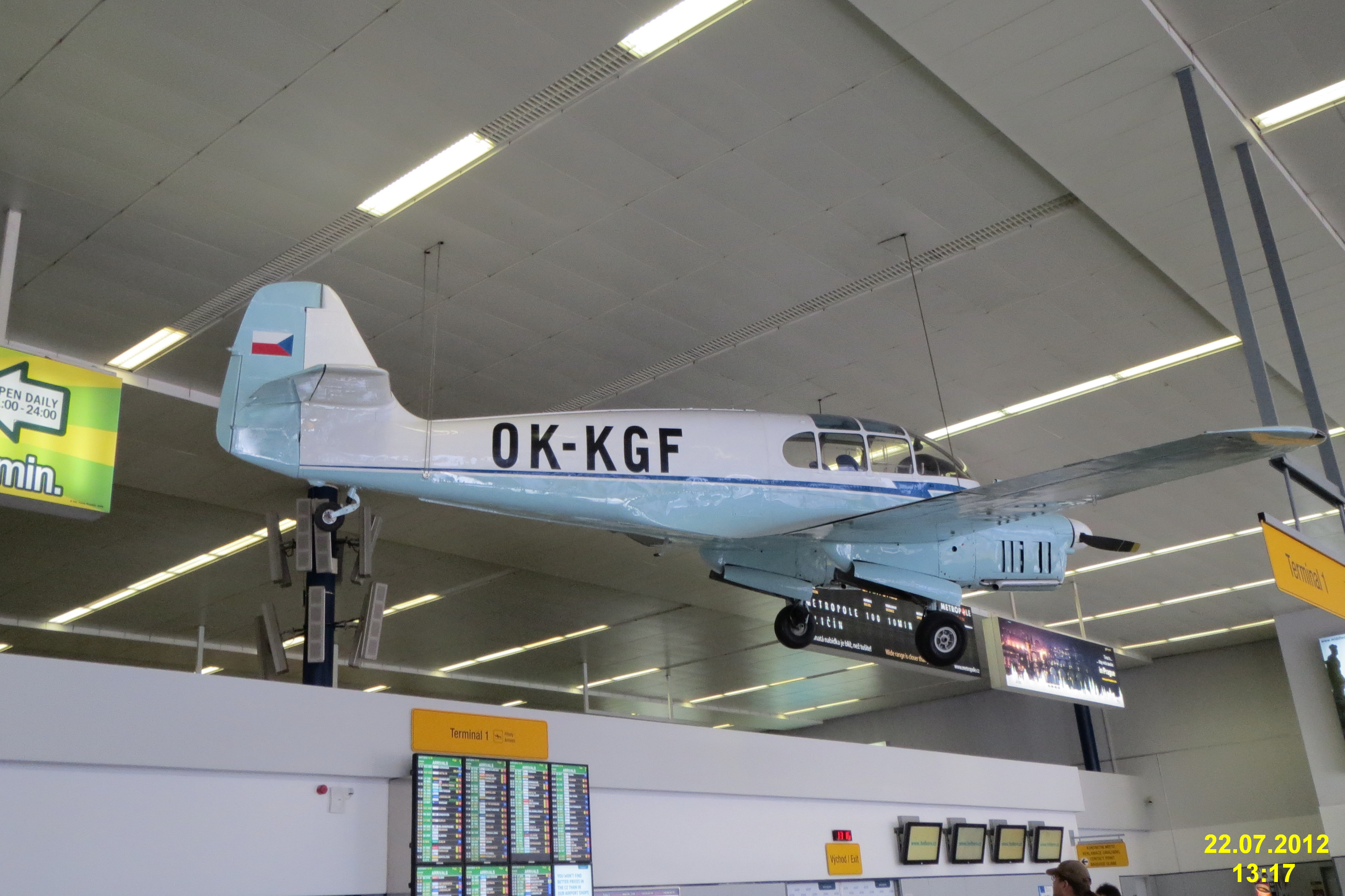
Preserved Aero 45 in Prague Airport, Terminal 1

=== Civil operators ===
Australia

- Commodore Aviation

Czechoslovakia
East Germany

- Interflug

Hungary

- Hungarian Police
- Hungarian Air Ambulance Service

Italy
Malaya
Poland

- LOT Polish Airlines operated three Ae-45 in 1952–1957
- Polish Air Ambulance Service operated Ae-45 and Ae-145

Romania

- Aviasan

Soviet Union

- Aeroflot

Switzerland
Slovenia

- Aeroclub Ajdovščina

Vietnam

- Vietnam Civil Aviation Department – later as Vietnam Civil Aviation (now Vietnam Airlines)

=== Military operators ===
China

- People's Liberation Army Air Force operated license-built Suingari-1 variant.

Czechoslovakia

- Czechoslovak Air Force operated aircraft under designation K-75, for liaison purpose.
- Czechoslovak National Security Guard

East Germany

- East German Air Force

Hungary

- Hungarian Air Force

India

- Indian Air Force operated a single aircraft gifted by the Czech government

Katanga

- Katangese Air Force

Romania

- Romanian Air Force

Vietnam

- Vietnam People's Air Force – three Ae-45 from 1956 (acquired from China)

== Specifications (Aero 145) ==
Data from Jane's All The World's Aircraft 1961–62

General characteristics

- Crew: 1
- Capacity: 3-4 passengers
- Length: 7.77 m (25 ft 6 in)
- Wingspan: 12.25 m (40 ft 2 in)
- Height: 2.3 m (7 ft 7 in)
- Wing area: 17.1 m^{2} (184 sq ft)
- Airfoil: Aero No.58-64
- Empty weight: 960 kg (2,116 lb)
- Gross weight: 1,500 kg (3,307 lb)
- Max takeoff weight: 1,600 kg (3,527 lb) (full fuel)
- Fuel capacity: 324 L (86 US gal; 71 imp gal)
- Powerplant: 2 × Avia M 332-III 4-cylinder air-cooled inverted in-line piston engines, 100 kW (140 hp) each
- Propellers: 2-bladed Type V410, 1.9 m (6 ft 3 in) diameter electrically-operated metal 4-position variable-pitch propellers

Performance

- Maximum speed: 282 km/h (175 mph, 152 kn) at 1,600 kg (3,500 lb) AUW
- Cruise speed: 250 km/h (160 mph, 130 kn) at 1,600 kg (3,500 lb) AUW
- Range: 1,700 km (1,100 mi, 920 nmi)
- Service ceiling: 5,900 m (19,400 ft)
- Service ceiling one engine out: 2,200 m (7,200 ft)
- Rate of climb: 5 m/s (980 ft/min)
- Wing loading: 87.8 kg/m^{2} (18.0 lb/sq ft)
- Power/mass: 9.5 kg/kW (15.7 lb/hp)
- Take-off run to 15 m (49 ft): 460 m (1,510 ft)

== See also ==
Aircraft of comparable role, configuration, and era

- Akaflieg Berlin B9
- Beechcraft Twin Bonanza
- Ikarus 451
- Miles Gemini
- Reid and Sigrist R.S.3
