= Frontier MD-II =

American homebuilt aircraft

MD-II

General information
- Type: Homebuilt aircraft
- National origin: United States
- Manufacturer: Frontier Aircraft Inc
- Status: Production completed
- Number built: 2

History
- Introduction date: 1990s

The Frontier MD-II was an American homebuilt aircraft that was designed and supplied as a kit by Frontier Aircraft Inc of Vail, Colorado, introduced in the 1990s.

== Design and development ==
The MD-II featured a strut-braced high-wing, a two-seats-in-side-by-side configuration enclosed cockpit accessed via doors, fixed conventional landing gear with wheel pants and a single tractor engine.

The aircraft was fabricated from 2024-T3 aluminum sheet. Its 29.50 ft (9.0 m) span wing employed a USA 35B airfoil, mounted flaps and had an area of 177.0 sq ft (16.44 m^{2}). The cabin width was 41 in (100 cm). The acceptable power range was 65 to 200 hp (48 to 149 kW) and the standard powerplant used was the 140 hp (104 kW) Avia M 332 (LOM) four cylinder, inverted, air-cooled, supercharged, inline aircraft engine.

With the Avia engine the MD-II had a typical empty weight of 1,150 lb (520 kg) and a gross weight of 2,000 lb (910 kg), giving a useful load of 850 lb (390 kg). With full fuel of 43 U.S. gallons (160 L; 36 imp gal) the payload for pilot, passenger and baggage was 592 lb (269 kg).

The manufacturer estimated the construction time from the supplied kit at 1500 hours.

== Operational history ==
By 1998, the company reported two kits had been sold with two aircraft complete and flying.

In December 2013, no examples were registered with the US Federal Aviation Administration.

== Specifications (MD-II) ==
Data from AeroCrafter

General characteristics

- Crew: one
- Capacity: one passenger
- Length: 27 ft 6 in (8.38 m)
- Wingspan: 29 ft 6 in (8.99 m)
- Wing area: 177.0 sq ft (16.44 m^{2})
- Airfoil: USA 35B
- Empty weight: 1,150 lb (522 kg)
- Gross weight: 2,000 lb (907 kg)
- Fuel capacity: 43 U.S. gallons (160 L; 36 imp gal)
- Powerplant: 1 × Avia M 332 four cylinder, inverted, air-cooled, supercharged, inline aircraft engine, 140 hp (100 kW)
- Propellers: single blade metal

Performance

- Maximum speed: 184 mph (296 km/h, 160 kn)
- Cruise speed: 140 mph (230 km/h, 120 kn)
- Stall speed: 30 mph (48 km/h, 26 kn) flaps down
- Range: 690 mi (1,110 km, 600 nmi)
- Service ceiling: 16,000 ft (4,900 m)
- Rate of climb: 1,200 ft/min (6.1 m/s)
- Wing loading: 11.3 lb/sq ft (55 kg/m^{2})
