= National Aerospace University – Kharkiv Aviation Institute =

Public university in Kharkiv, Ukraine

Coordinates: 49°59′33″N 36°13′52″E

National Aerospace University "Kharkiv Aviation Institute", KhAI
- Type: National
- Established: 1930
- Affiliations: Ministry of Education and Science of Ukraine
- Rector: Mykola Nechyporuk
- Students: 6 876
- Location: 17, Chkalova str., Kharkiv, Ukraine, 61070, Kharkiv, Ukraine
- Website: khai.edu
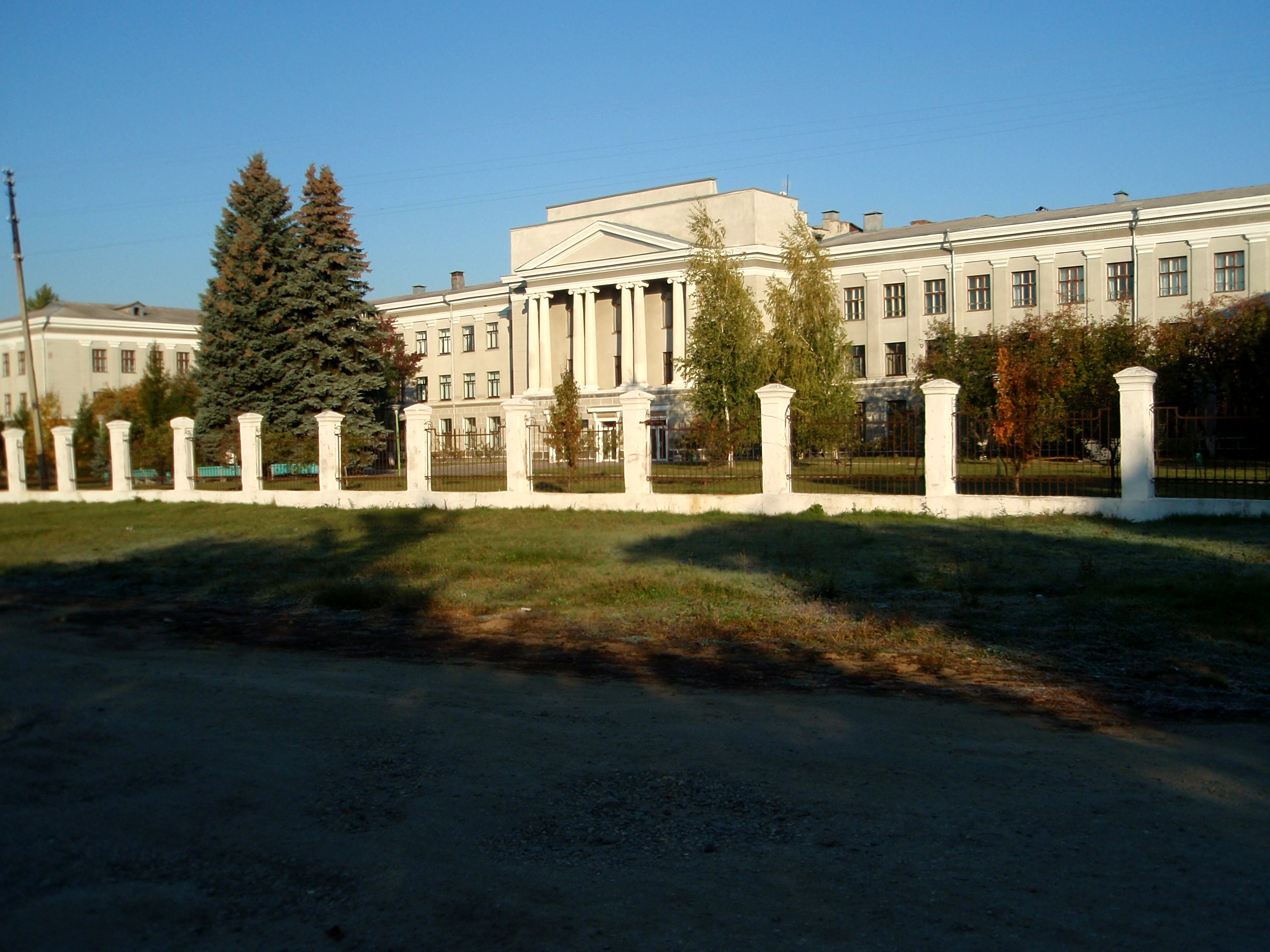

Immovable Monument of Local Significance of Ukraine
- Official name: Будівля авіаційного інституту (Building of the aviation institute)
- Type: History
- Reference no.: 3315-Ха

University rankings

Regional – Overall
- QS Emerging Europe and Central Asia: 251-300 (2022)

The National Aerospace University "Kharkiv Aviation Institute" (abbr. KhAI, Ukrainian: Національний аерокосмічний університет «Харківський авіаційний інститут», romanized: Natsionalnyi aerokosmichnyi universytet «Kharkivskyi aviatsiinyi instytut», abbr. ХАІ) is a state-sponsored research university in Kharkiv, Ukraine which specializes in aviation and space engineering. The KhAI was founded in 1930.

== History ==
The KhAI was founded in 1930 on the basis of aviation division of the Kharkiv Polytechnic Institute. In 1941-44 it was evacuated to Kazan.

Its history is closely connected with the development of aircraft engineering and science in the Soviet Union. The university is famous for its creation of the first in Europe high-speed airplane with a retractable landing gear and the creation of the design of the turbojet engine developed by teacher of the KhAI A. M. Liulka who afterwards became the academician and designer of many structures of aircraft engines including the engine of the aircraft Su-27.

The KhAI is a higher educational institution where the airplanes developed by the Institute Design Bureau under the supervision of professor I. G. Neman were produced serially at the aircraft plants and run on passenger airlines.

From 1977 to 1984 the Designer General O.K. Antonov ran the department of airplane structure at the KhAI.

In 1978 the KhAI was given the name of N. Ye. Zhukovskiy. In 1980 the institute was awarded with the order of Lenin. In 1998 the N. Ye. Zhukovskiy State Aerospace University “Kharkiv Aviation Institute” was founded on the basis of the KhAI and in 2000 the University got a status of the National higher education institution and was renamed the National Aerospace University ″Kharkiv Aviation Institute″.

== Students ==
The university has trained about 53 000 engineers. More than 80% of the specialists with higher education who work in Ukrainian aerospace area are the graduates of the KhAI.

At present about 7000 students and 160 post-graduate students are trained at the university; 700 teachers and 2000 employers work here. Among them there are 95 professors and doctors of science, more than 400 associate professors and candidates of sciences. Among the teachers of the university there is 1 USSR State Lenin Prize winner, 3 USSR State Prize winners, 25 Ukraine State Prize winners, 11 USSR Council of Ministers Prize winners.

In 1992 the KhAI resumed the training of foreign students. Over 1000 foreign citizens from 40 countries of Asia, Africa and America are trained annually at the university.

== Faculties ==
- Faculty of Aircraft Engineering
- Faculty of Aircraft Engines'
- Faculty of Aircraft Control Systems
- Faculty of Rocket and Space Engineering
- Faculty of Aircraft Radio electronic Systems
- Faculty of Economics and Management
- Faculty of Humanities
- Faculty for International Students

== Programmes ==
- Bachelor's degree – 4 years
- Specialist Degree – 1/1.5 years (depends on the specific training programme) after B.Sc.
- Master's degree – 1.5/2 years (depends on the specific training programme) after B.Sc.
- Candidate of Science (Ph.D.) – 3 years after M.Sc. or Specialist Degree
- Doctor of Science – 3 years after Ph.D.

== Languages ==
The majority of KhAI Training Programmes are provided in Ukrainian. But KHAI also have a set of International Oriented Studies (IOS) Bachelor's and Master's of Science Programmes in English (full list you can find on Official website). For international students KhAI has 1-month Training Programme at the Preparatory Department for further study at University in Russian.

== Memberships and programs ==
1. European and Global International Associations and Communities (International Association of Universities (IAU/UNESCO), European Group of Aeronautics and Space Universities (PEGASUS), The Magna Charta of the European Universities, International Association of Technical Universities from CIS Countries, Academic Association of CIS Countries Higher Education, European Aeronautic Science Network (EASN))
2. Bilateral cooperation (Technion Research and Development Foundation LTD (Israel)
3. EU Framework Programmes
4. TEMPUS Programme
5. Dual Degree Programmes with other universities
6. Working and Training Abroad for KhAI Students and Staff
7. Educational Programmes for Foreign Citizens

== Aircraft designs ==
From:

- Kharkiv KhAI-1
- Kharkiv KhAI-2 (1932)
- Kharkiv KhAI-2 (1934)
- Kharkiv KhAI-2 (1937)
- Kharkiv KhAI-4 Iskra
- Kharkiv KhAI-5 (R-10/PS-5)
- Kharkiv KhAI-6
- Kharkiv KhAI-8
- Kharkiv KhAI-11
- Kharkiv KhAI-12 Start
- Kharkiv KhAI-13 Gymnast
- Kharkiv KhAI-14 Orlyonok
- Kharkiv KhAI-17
- Kharkiv KhAI-18
- Kharkiv KhAI-19
- Kharkiv KhAI-20
- Kharkiv KhAI-21
- Kharkiv KhAI-22
- Kharkiv KhAI-23
- Kharkiv KhAI-24
- Kharkiv KhAI-25
- Kharkiv KhAI-25
- Kharkiv KhAI-26
- Kharkiv KhAI-27 Kharkovchanin
- Kharkiv KhAI-28
- Kharkiv KhAI-29 Korshun
- Kharkiv KhAI-30 Professor Nyeman
- Kharkiv KhAI-31
- Kharkiv KhAI-32
- Kharkiv KhAI-33
- Kharkiv KhAI-34
- Kharkiv KhAI-35 Entuziast
- Kharkiv KhAI-36
- Kharkiv KhAI-37 Mikhail Efimov
- Kharkiv KhAI-38
- Kharkiv KhAI-39
- Kharkiv KhAI-40
- Kharkiv KhAI-41
- Kharkiv KhAI-42
- Kharkiv KhAI-43
- Kharkiv KhAI-44
- Kharkiv KhAI-45
- Kharkiv KhAI-46
- Kharkiv KhAI-47
- Kharkiv KhAI-48
- Kharkiv KhAI-49
- Kharkiv KhAI-51
- Kharkiv KhAI-52
- Kharkiv KhAI-60 (60 let KhAI)
- Kharkiv KhAI-70
- Kharkiv KhAI-80
- Kharkiv KhAI-90
- Kharkiv KhAI-92
- Kharkiv KhAI-112
- Kharkiv KhAI-150

== See also ==
List of universities in Ukraine
