= Let LF-109 Pionýr =

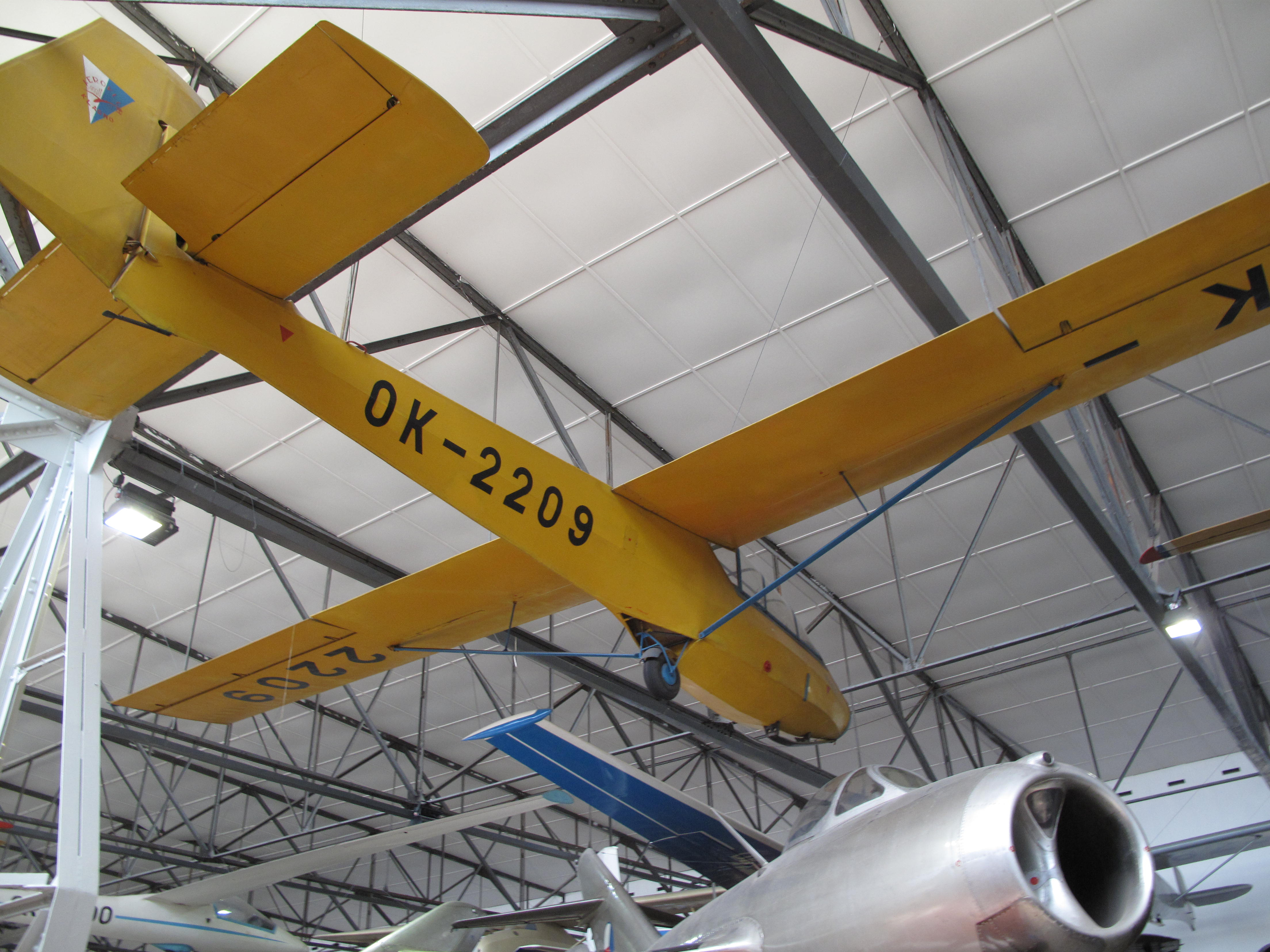

General information
- Type: Glider
- National origin: Czechoslovakia
- Manufacturer: Let Kunovice
- Number built: ca. 470

History
- First flight: 1950

The Let LF-109 Pionýr is a glider aircraft developed by Czechoslovak manufacturer Let Kunovice. It was designed as a two-seater training aircraft and the first flight was performed in March 1950. The plane features a simple and robust design of a fabric-covered steel tube fuselage and has good flight characteristics. In total, about 470 aircraft were built.

== Specifications ==
General characteristics

- Crew: one
- Capacity: one passenger
- Length: 7.770 m (25 ft 5.90 in)
- Wingspan: 13.470 m (44 ft 2.32 in)
- Wing area: 20.200 m^{2} (217.431 sq ft)
- Aspect ratio: 8.98
- Airfoil: 9% maximum thickness
- Empty weight: 250 kg (551.2 lb)
- Gross weight: 440 kg (970.0 lb)

Performance
