= Pentax Optio L40 =

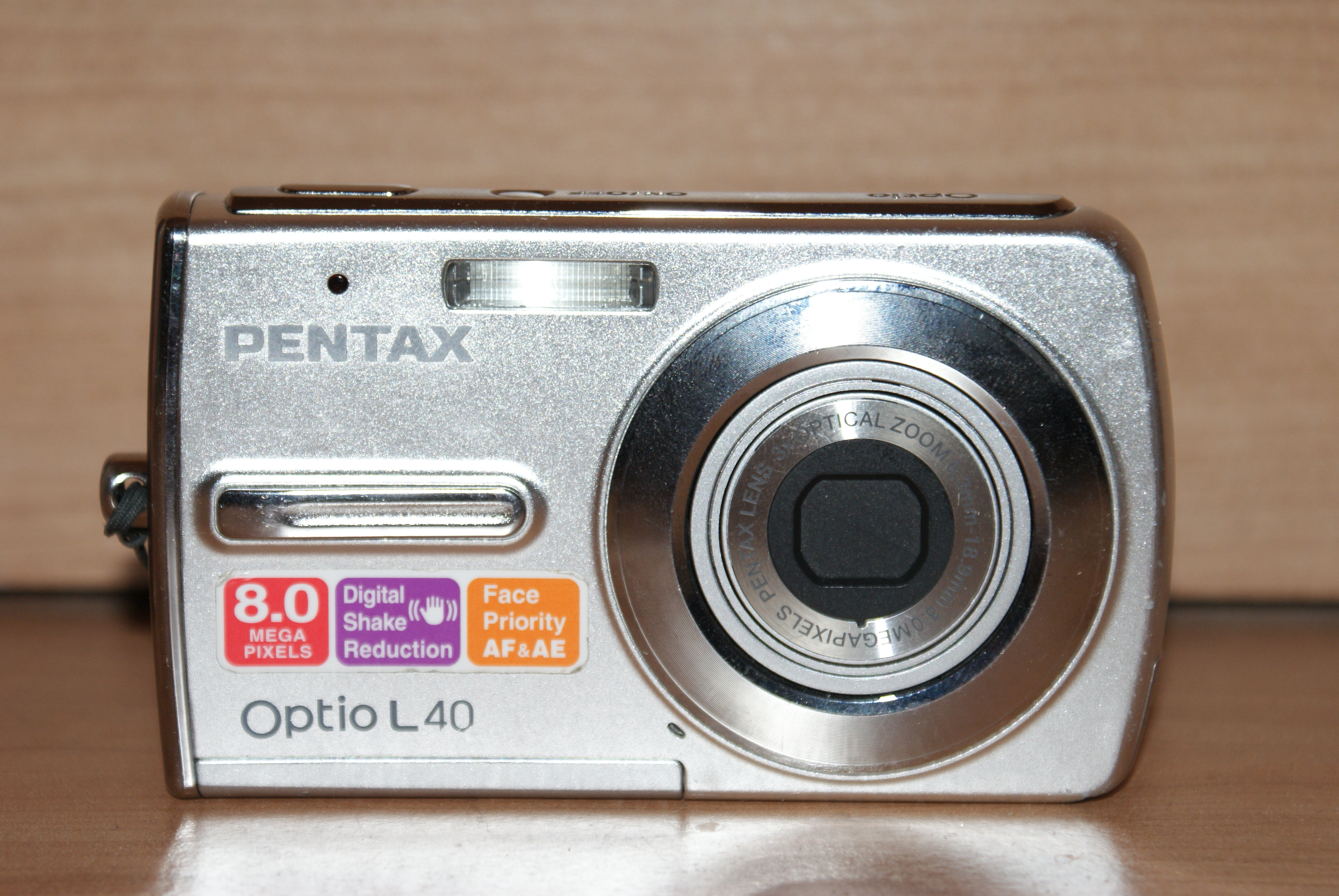
A picture of the Pentax (Optio) L40 camera.

The Pentax Optio L40 is a digital compact camera by Pentax which was released in October 2007. The digital camera has 8.0 megapixels, 22MB internal memory, 3x Optical zoom and a 4x Digital zoom.
