= Orličan L-40 Meta Sokol =

Czechoslovak sports and touring aircraft

L-40 Meta Sokol
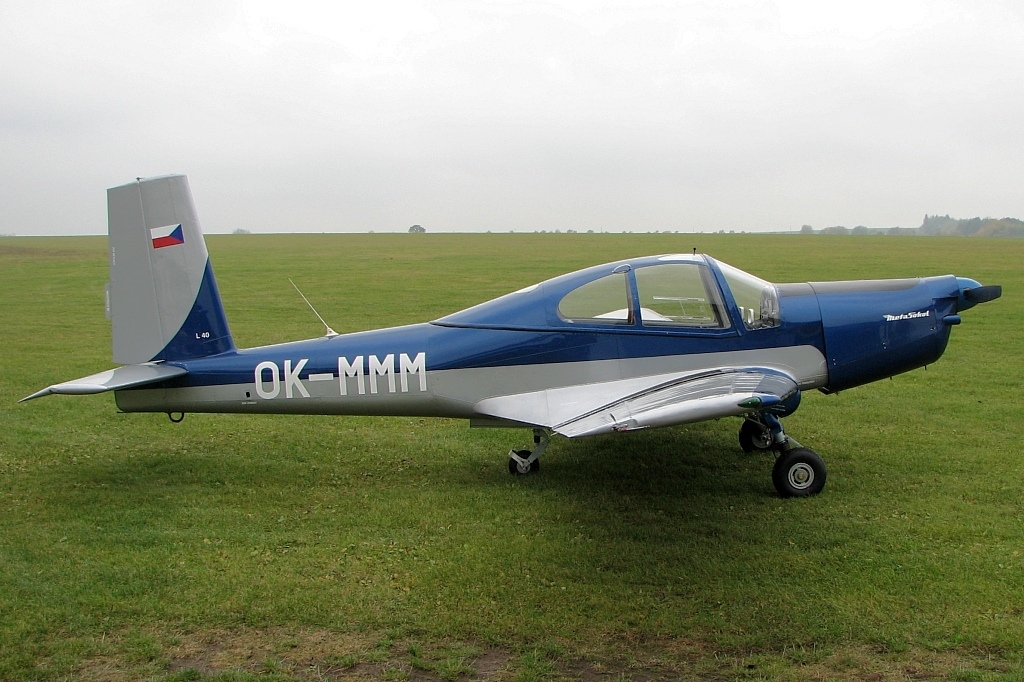

General information
- Type: Touring aircraft
- Manufacturer: Orličan
- Status: in use
- Primary user: Czechoslovak aviation
- Number built: 106

History
- Manufactured: 1957–1959
- First flight: 29 March 1956

The L-40 Meta Sokol was a Czechoslovak sports and touring four-seat single-engine low-wing aircraft of the late 1950s.

== Development ==
A predecessor of the L-40 was a sports and touring plane M-1 Sokol of wooden construction. Next there was a sports plane with V-tail LD-40, designed by Zdenek Rublič. Its prototype XLD-40 was flown on 30 July 1950, however, it did not meet required performance and was abandoned. In 1954 the design of a further improved variant, the LD-40 started again, with the tail changed to a conventional one. The plane had a number of shortcomings, and further work continued. Eventually the aircraft was redesigned as a four-seater touring aircraft, under the designation L-40 Meta Sokol.

The prototype of the L-40, the XL-40, flew first on 29 March 1956. Another prototype flew in August 1956, introducing some simplification of construction. In 1957 the aircraft entered production, and by 1959, 106 were built. The first series of 10 aircraft had 77 kW (103 hp) Walter Minor III-4 engine, with the remainder powered by more powerful (103 kW (138 hp)) Walter M-332 engines. Four persons sat in two rows, with dual controls. An unusual feature is the reversed tricycle gear, with main gear near the wing's leading edge and relatively big rear wheel near the wing's rear edge, which resulted in the fuselage being almost horizontal on the ground.

== Use ==
The primary user was the Czechoslovak civilian aviation. Over half of production was exported to 16 countries, among others to Germany, Great Britain, Switzerland and Australia. Several FAI world records were set on the L-40.

== Description ==
The L-40 Meta Sokol is a single-engine low-wing cantilever monoplane of metal construction. It features a fuselage built of a frame in the front part, of semi-monocoque in rear part, and is duralumin covered. Additionally, it features a duralumin covered trapezoid three-part wing, fitted with split flaps. It has a conventional tail, with its steering surfaces covered with canvas. The tail fin is high and trapezoidal. The plane has four seats in two rows, with twin controls in front. All are placed under a slim, partly glazed, rearwards-sliding canopy. At the rear, there is some luggage space. It has an inline engine in front, with a two-blade V-410 tractor propeller of a variable pitch. An unusual feature is its retractable reversed tricycle gear. The main gear's wheels are only half hidden in wings, making emergency landings safer. The aircraft's fuel tanks are in the wings, and small, teardrop-shaped tanks could be fitted to the wingtips.

== Specifications ==
Data from

General characteristics

- Crew: 1
- Capacity: 3 passengers
- Length: 7.56 m (24 ft 10 in)
- Wingspan: 10.3 m (33 ft 10 in)
- Height: 2.46 m (8 ft 1 in)
- Wing area: 14.56 m^{2} (156.7 sq ft)
- Airfoil: root: Be-1120 (15%); tip: Be-1120 (10%)
- Empty weight: 534 kg (1,177 lb)
- Gross weight: 934 kg (2,059 lb)
- Max takeoff weight: 950 kg (2,094 lb)
- Powerplant: 1 × Avia M332 4-cylinder air-cooled inverted in-line piston engine, 103 kW (138 hp)
- Propellers: 2-bladed

Performance

- Maximum speed: 237 km/h (147 mph, 128 kn)
- Cruise speed: 204 km/h (127 mph, 110 kn)
- Range: 1,100 km (680 mi, 590 nmi)
- Service ceiling: 5,050 m (16,570 ft)
- Rate of climb: 4.5 m/s (890 ft/min)

== See also ==
Related development

- Mráz Sokol

Aircraft of comparable role, configuration, and era

- Piaggio P.149
- Ryan Navion
- Socata Rallye
