= Let L-33 Solo =

L-33 Solo
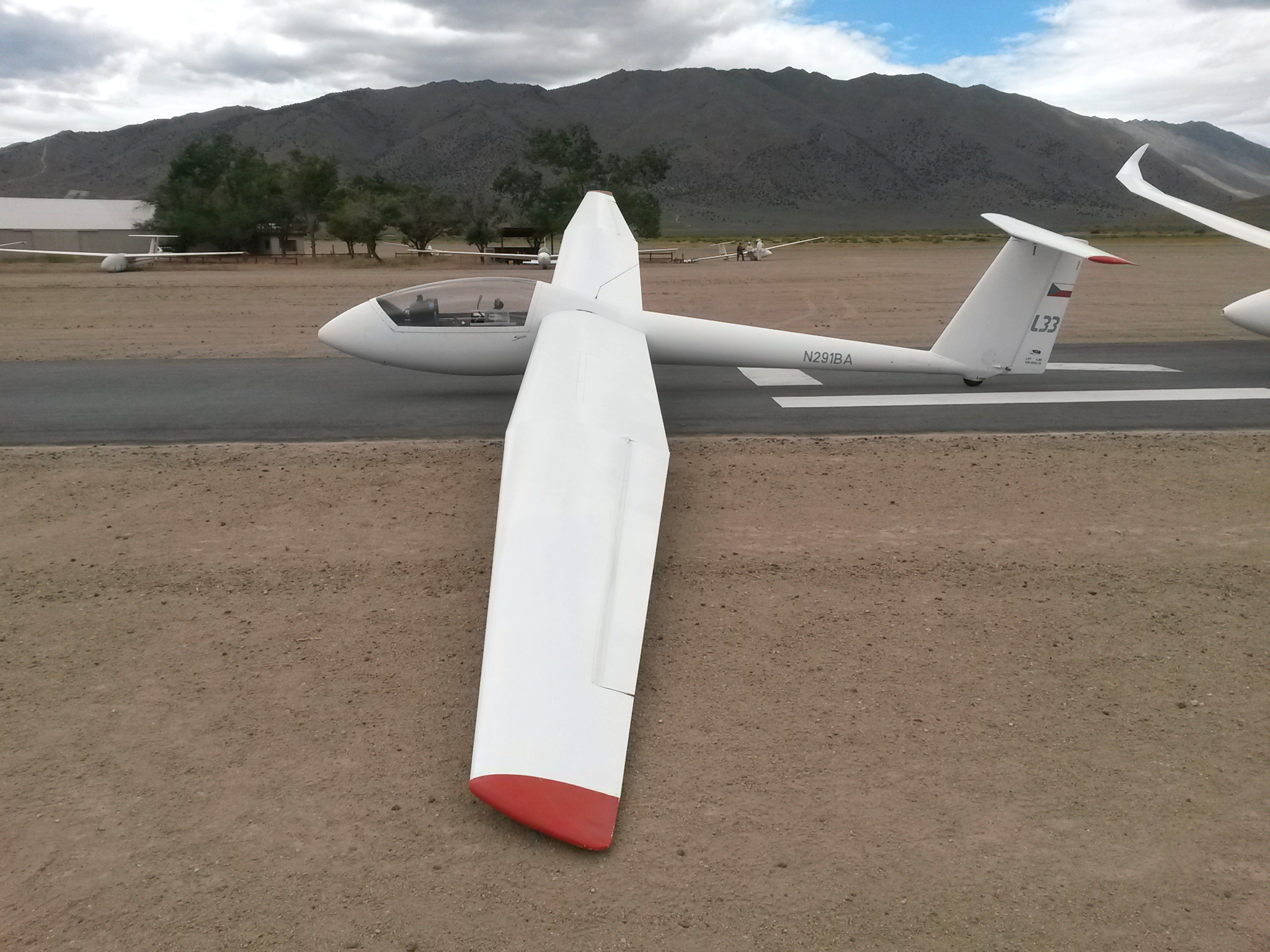

General information
- Type: Glider
- National origin: Czech Republic
- Manufacturer: Let Kunovice
- Designer: Marian Meciar and Vaclav Zajic
- Status: In production (2012)
- Number built: 94 (2011)

History
- Manufactured: 1992–present
- Introduction date: 1992
- First flight: 1992

The Let L-33 Solo is a Czech shoulder-wing, single-seat, glider, designed by Marian Meciar and Vaclav Zajic, and produced by Let Kunovice. The L-33 first flew in 1992 and remained in production through 2012, supplied as a ready-to-fly aircraft.

== Design and development ==
The L-33 was a developed as the single-seat "natural step" for early solo students to fly after dual training on the two-seat LET L-23 Super Blaník. The L-33 features a cantilever wing, a T-tail, a single-seat enclosed cockpit under a bubble canopy and fixed monowheel gear.

The semi-monocoque design is made from flush riveted aluminum sheet. The rudder is covered with doped aircraft fabric. Its 14.12 m (46.3 ft) span, semi-tapered wing employs a Wortmann FX-60-17A11-182 airfoil at the wing root, transitioning to an FX-60-126 at the wing tip. The wing has an area of 11 m^{2} (120 sq ft) and mounts top surface Schempp-Hirth-style air brakes.

The L-33 was a competitor in the IGC World Class sailplane design competition, but lost to the Polish Politechnika Warszawska PW-5. The design is type certified to JAR 22 in Argentina, Canada, the Czech Republic, Germany, Hungary, Japan, the United Kingdom and the United States.

== Operational history ==
By November 2012, 92 examples had been produced. In March 2025, 42 examples are registered with the Federal Aviation Administration in the United States, 4 with Transport Canada and one with the British Civil Aviation Authority.

== Specifications (L-33 Solo) ==
Data from Bayerl and the Sailplane Directory

General characteristics

- Crew: one
- Wingspan: 14.12 m (46 ft 4 in)
- Wing area: 11 m^{2} (120 sq ft)
- Aspect ratio: 18.12:1
- Empty weight: 210 kg (463 lb)
- Gross weight: 340 kg (750 lb)

Performance

- Stall speed: 65 km/h (40 mph, 35 kn)
- Never exceed speed: 248 km/h (154 mph, 134 kn)
- Maximum glide ratio: 33:1 at 83 km/h (52 mph)
- Rate of sink: 0.66 m/s (130 ft/min)
- Wing loading: 30.9 kg/m^{2} (6.3 lb/sq ft)

== See also ==
Related lists

- List of gliders
