= N700 Series Shinkansen =

Japanese high speed train type

N700 series
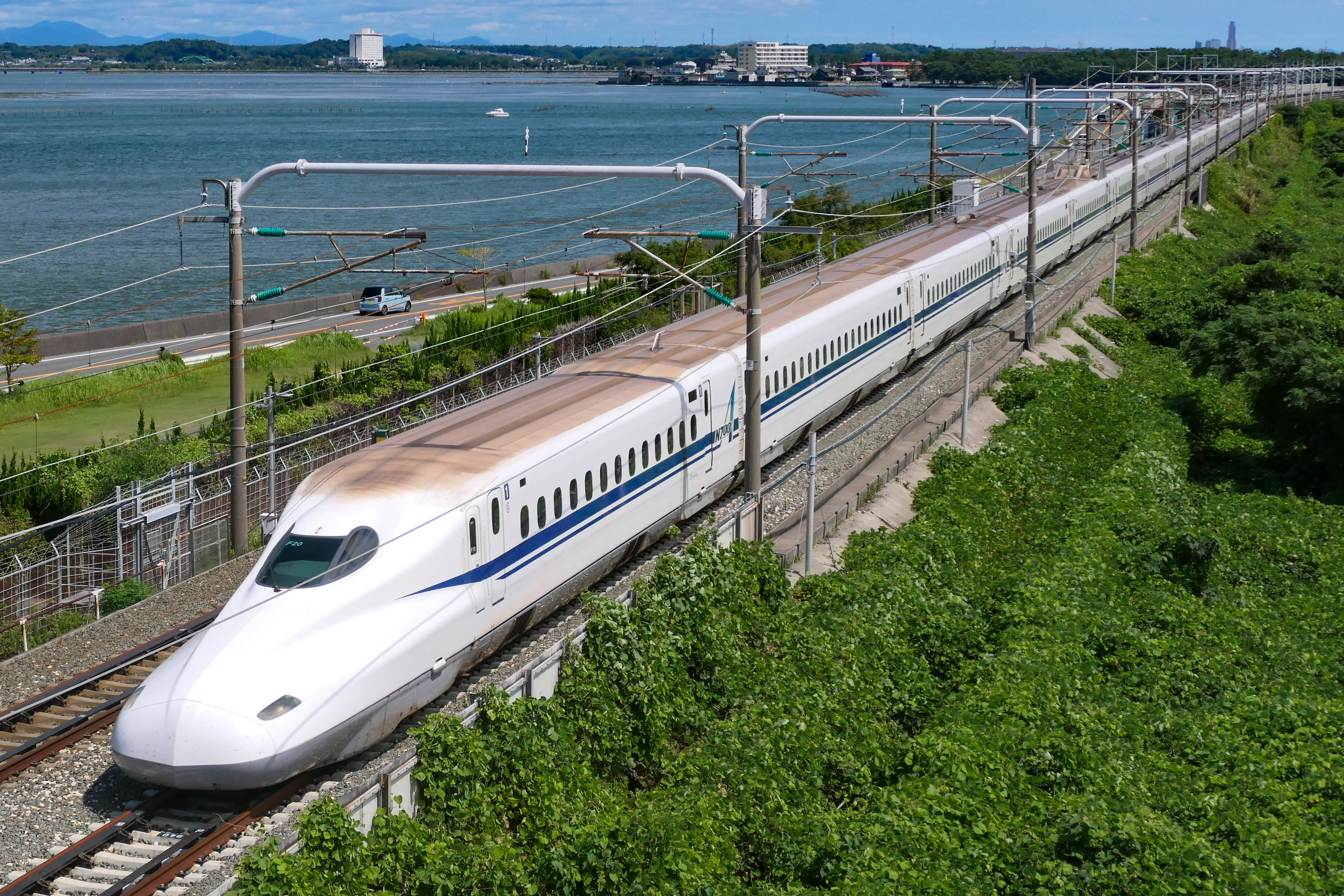
- N700A series train on the Tokaido Shinkansen
- Stock type: Electric multiple unit
- In service: 1 July 2007 – present
- Manufacturers: Hitachi, Kawasaki Heavy Industries, Kinki Sharyo, Nippon Sharyo
- Replaced: 300, 500, and 700 series
- Constructed: 2005–2020
- Scrapped: 2019–
- Number in service: 2,624 vehicles (179 sets, as of 1 April 2022)
- Number preserved: 3 vehicles
- Number scrapped: 365 vehicles
- Successor: N700S series
- Formation: 8 or 16 cars per trainset
- Capacity: 16-car set: 1,323 (200 Green + 1,123 ordinary); 8-car (S&R) set: 546 (24 Green + 522 ordinary); 8-car Kodama (P) set: 588 (200 Reserved + 388 Non-Reserved)
- Operators: JR Central; JR West; JR Kyushu
- Depots: Tokyo, Osaka (JR Central); Hakata (JR West); Kumamoto (JR Kyushu)
- Lines served: Tōkaidō, San'yō, Kyūshū, Hakataminami

Specifications
- Car body construction: Aluminium
- Car length: End cars: 25.35 m (83.2 ft); Intermediate cars: 25 m (82 ft)
- Width: 3.36 m (11 ft)
- Height: 3.5 m (11 ft 6 in) without rooftop equipment
- Maximum speed: Tōkaidō: 285 km/h (177 mph); San'yō: 300 km/h (190 mph); Kyushu: 260 km/h (160 mph); Design: 330 km/h (210 mph)
- Weight: 16-car set: 715 t (1,576,000 lb)
- Traction motors: 56 × 305 kW (409 hp) AC
- Power output: 17,080 kW (22,900 hp)
- Acceleration: 2.6 km/(h⋅s) (0.72 m/s^{2}; 1.6 mph/s)
- Electric system: Overhead line, 25 kV 60 Hz AC
- Current collection: Pantograph
- UIC classification: N, Z and G sets: 2′2′+14 × Bo′Bo′+2′2′; R and S sets: 8 × Bo′Bo′
- Braking systems: Regenerative, pneumatic
- Safety systems: ATC-NS, KS-ATC (R and S sets)
- Track gauge: 1,435 mm (4 ft 8 1/2 in) standard gauge

Notes/references
- This train won the 51st Blue Ribbon Award in 2008.

The N700 series (Japanese: N700系, Hepburn: Enu nana-hyaku-kei) is a Japanese Shinkansen high-speed train with tilting capability developed jointly by JR Central and JR West for use on the Tōkaidō and San'yō Shinkansen lines. Constructed between 2005 and 2020, the type entered revenue service on 1 July 2007, replacing the earlier 300, 500, and 700 series. The N700 series is also operated by JR Kyushu on the Kyushu Shinkansen.

A total of 172 16-car sets (2,752 cars) and 30 8-car sets (240 cars) were built. N700 series trains have a maximum operating speed of 300km/h (190 mph), and their tilting mechanism—up to one degree—allows sustained operation at 270 km/h (168 mph) on 2,500-metre (8,202 ft) radius curves, which were previously limited to 255 km/h (158 mph). Compared with the 700 series, the N700 also features faster acceleration, with a maximum rate of 2.6 km/(h⋅s) (0.72 m/s^{2}; 1.6 mph/s), enabling it to reach 270 km/h (168 mph) in approximately three minutes.

Further refinements led to the development of the N700A, an incremental evolution that permits operation at 285 km/h (177 mph) on 3,000-metre (9,843 ft) radius curves, raising the maximum operating speed on the Tōkaidō Shinkansen to 285 km/h (177 mph). All N700 series sets were subsequently retrofitted with most N700A improvements.

These enhancements reduced end-to-end travel times, enabling the fastest Nozomi services between Tokyo and Osaka to complete the journey in as little as 2 hours and 22 minutes.

A successor design with additional refinements, the N700S, entered service in 2020 and is planned to gradually replace the N700 series; the first four sets began operation on 1 July 2020.

== Operations ==
Video Documentary: Shinkansen N700 Tokyo to Kyoto

N700 series trains gradually replaced 300, 500 and 700 series sets on Nozomi services, and by the end of February 2009, the N700 series were responsible for 74 Nozomi services per day. All Nozomi through runs (over the full route between Tokyo and Hakata) were scheduled to use the N700 series exclusively by 2009. From the start of the revised timetable on 17 March 2012, all regularly scheduled Nozomi services, including runs limited only to the Tokaido Shinkansen, were operated by N700 series sets.

Since 4 March 2017, the N700 is also used on regularly scheduled Hikari services during the day, as well as all Kodama trains on the Tokaido Shinkansen, since March 2020.

Since March 2009, the N700 series trains have been equipped with wireless internet available for use between Tokyo and Shin-Osaka.

Since September 2025, JR West started operation of the modified 8-car N700A sets on the Kodama service on the San'yō Shinkansen between Shin-Osaka and Hakata with a maximum operating speed of 285km/h (177 mph) with other Kodama Trains, the 500 and 700 series and is to be replacing the remaining 500 series sets.

=== Future plans ===
In an announcement by JR Central, JR West, and JR Kyushu made on 17 October 2023, the companies stated that all onboard smoking rooms on the Tokaido, San'yo, and Kyushu Shinkansen trains would be abolished by Q2 2024.

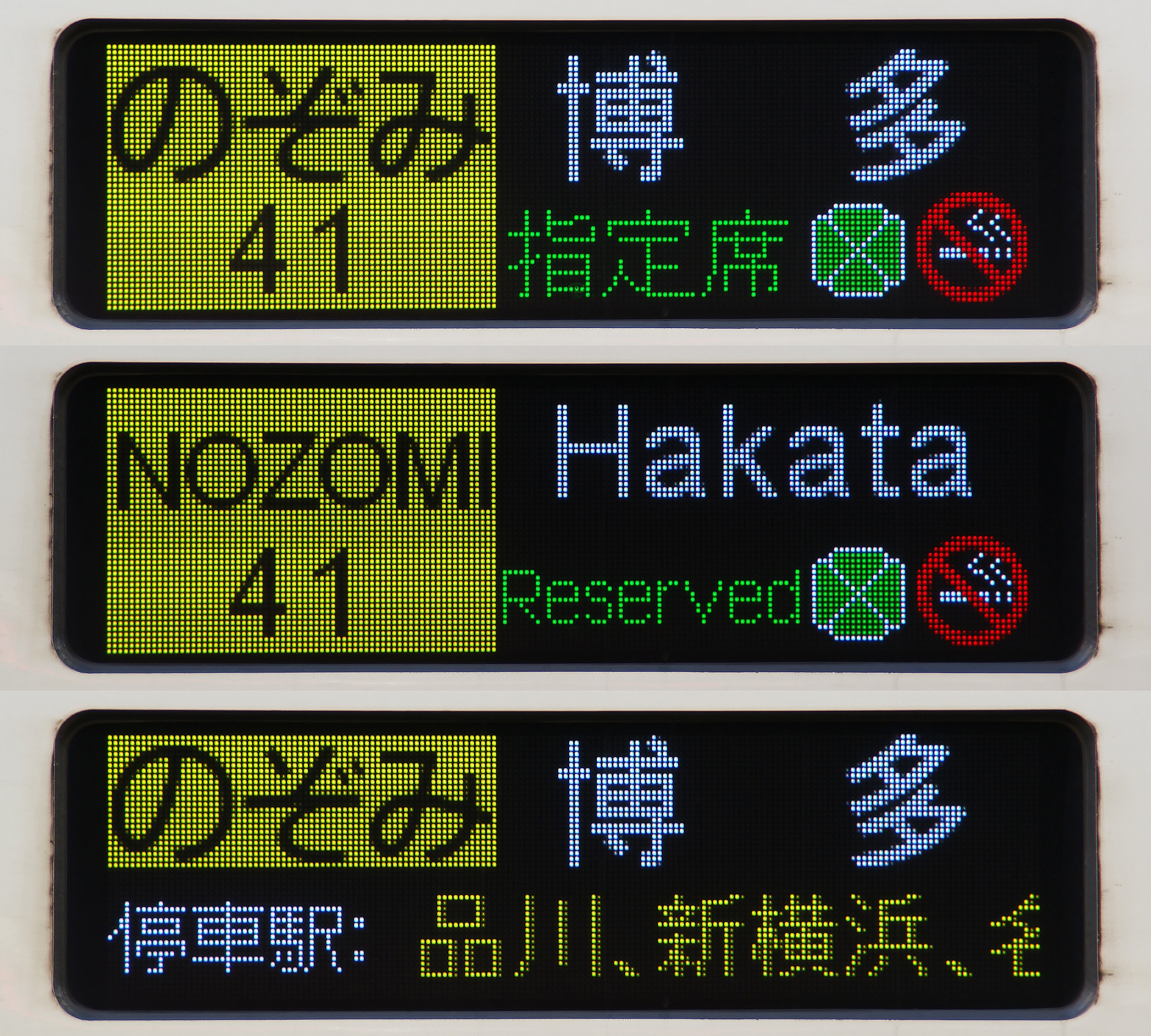
N700-3000 LED display

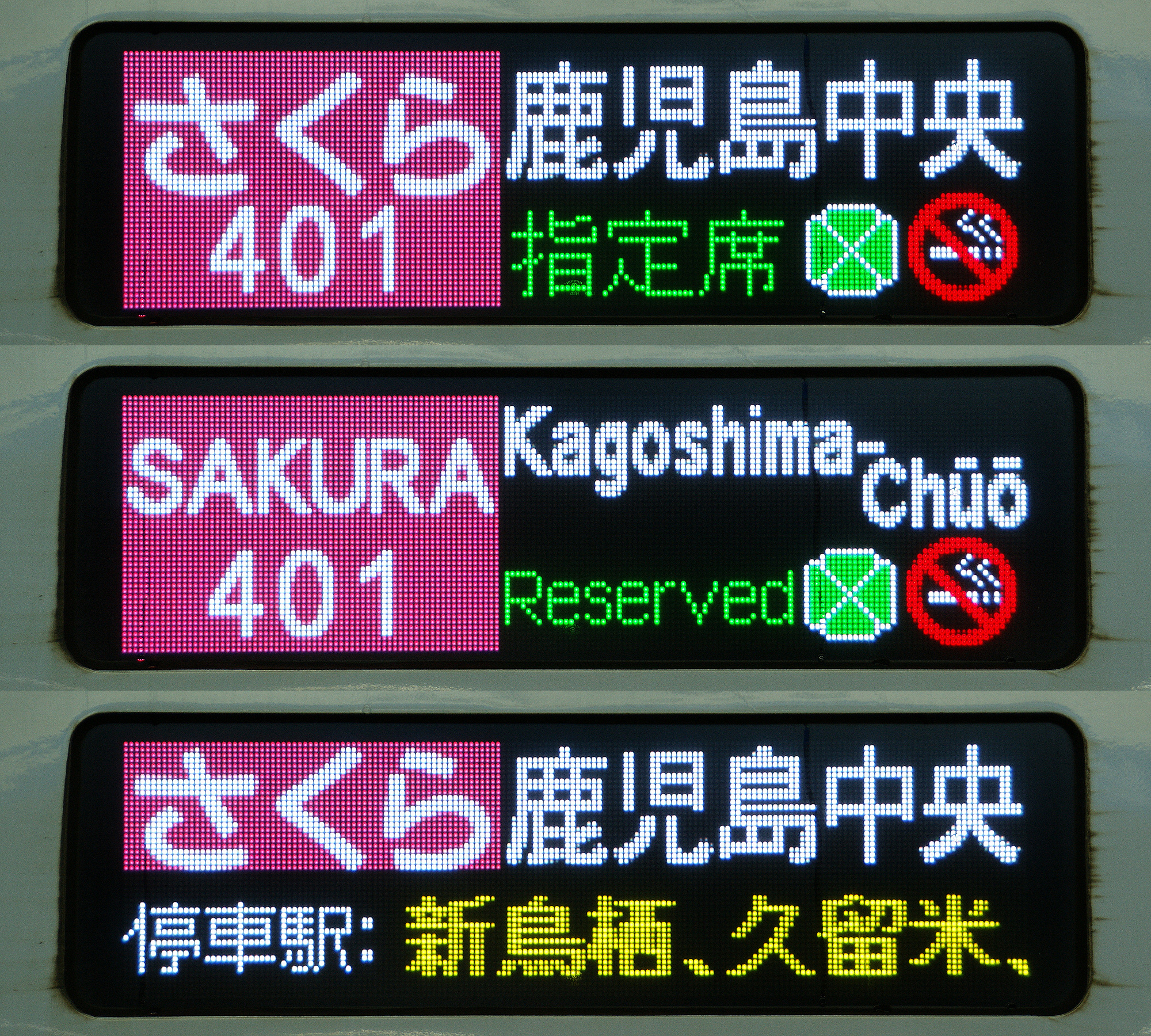
N700-8000 LED display

== Variants ==
Series	Version	Prefix	Owner	Cars	Sets	Introduced	Notes
0	N700	Z	JR Central	16	80	1 July 2007	All converted to N700A 2000 series (X sets) by August 2015
1000	N700A	G	JR Central	16	51	8 February 2013	New-build N700A sets
2000	N700A	X	JR Central	16	80	2013–2015	Converted from 0 series (Z sets)
3000	N700	N	JR West	16	16	1 July 2007	All converted to N700A 5000 series (K sets) by March 2016
4000	N700A	F	JR West	16	24	December 2013	New-build N700A sets
5000	N700A	K	JR West	16	16	October 2013	Converted from 3000 series (N sets); some later converted to 6000 series (P sets)
6000	N700A	P	JR West	8	14	September 2025	Converted from 16-car 5000 series (K sets)
7000	N700	S	JR West	8	19	12 March 2011	Operated on the Kyushu Shinkansen
8000	N700	R	JR Kyushu	8	11	12 March 2011	Operated on the Kyushu Shinkansen
9000	N700	Z0 / X0	JR Central	16	1		Prototype set. Later converted to N700A and redesignated X0. Retired 2019.

== 16-car G sets (N700-1000 series "N700A") ==
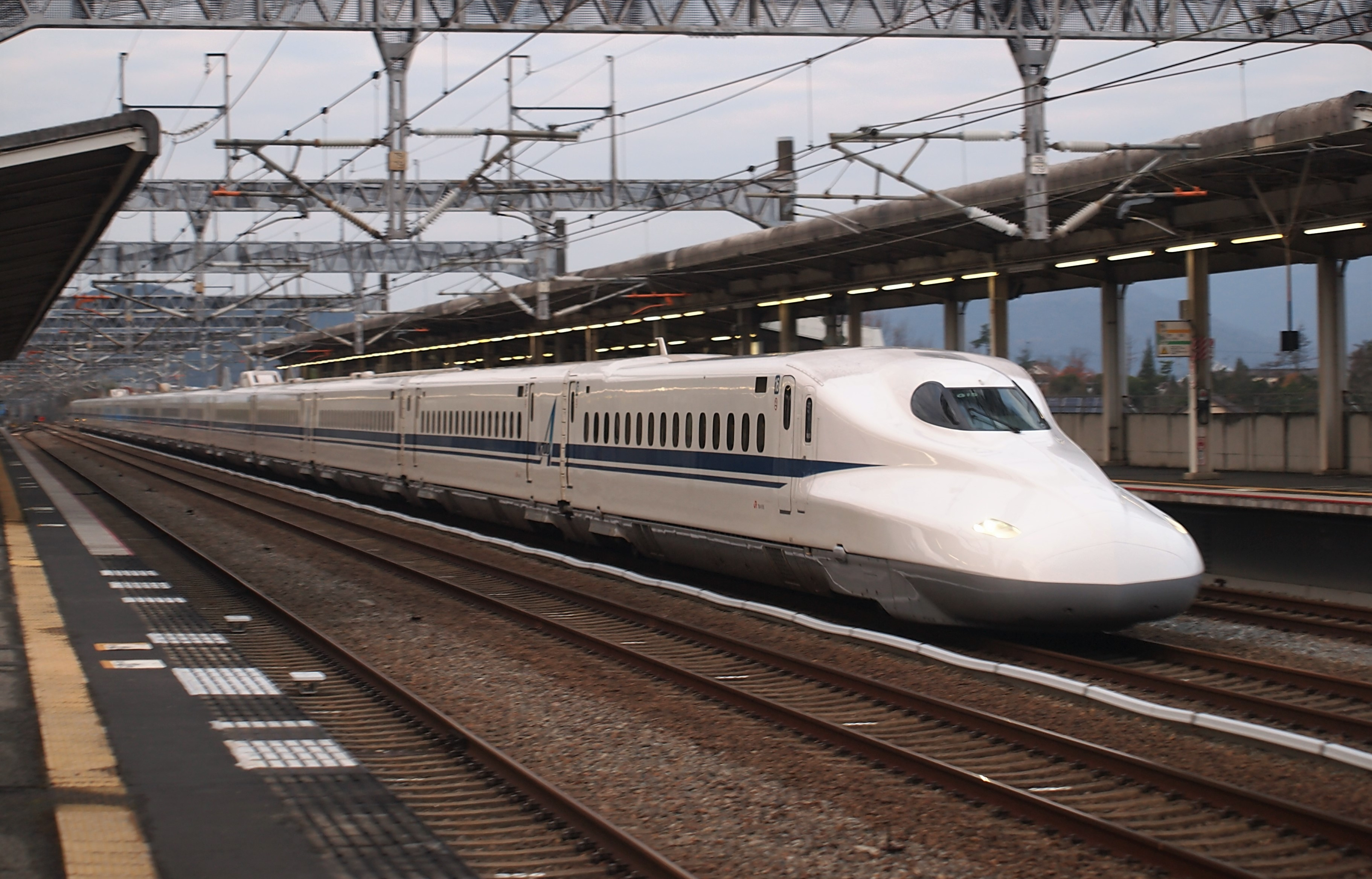
Set G15, December 2015

The N700-1000 series, or "N700A" (with "A" standing for "Advanced"), is a new version of the N700 series design delivered from August 2012, and entering revenue service from 8 February 2013.

The new version is externally identical to the existing N700 series sets, with the addition of new "N700A" logos on each odd-numbered car. The new trains include modified brake discs, bogie vibration detection, and ATC improvements.

Six "G" sets were scheduled to be introduced during fiscal 2012, replacing older 700 series sets, with seven more sets introduced during fiscal 2013. A further 18 sets are on order by JR Central, to be delivered six sets per year between fiscal 2014 and 2016 at a cost of 88 billion yen. In October 2015, JR Central announced that it had ordered a further 20 N700A series sets to be delivered between fiscal 2016 and 2019, replacing all of the remaining 700 series trains sets on Tokaido Shinkansen services.

The first set, G1, was delivered to Hamamatsu in August 2012, with test running commencing on the Tokaido Shinkansen the following month.

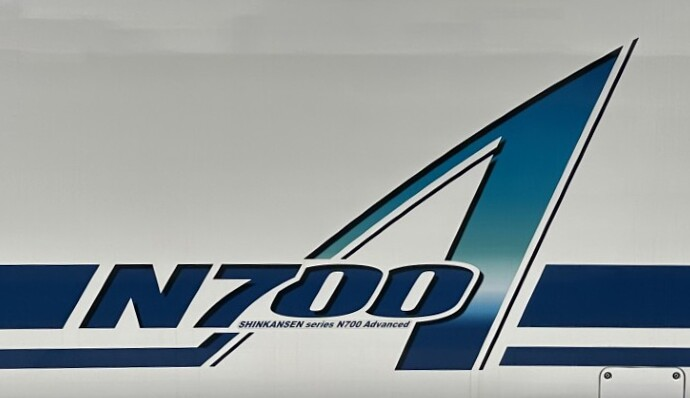
N700A logo on the side of car 15, December 2025

=== Formation ===
The 16-car G sets are formed as follows, with car 1 at the Shin-Osaka (western) end and car 16 at the Tokyo (eastern) end.

Car No.	1	2	3	4	5	6	7	8	9	10	11	12	13	14	15	16
Designation	Tc	M2	M'w	M1	M1w	M'	M2k	M1s	M1sw	M2s	M'h	M1	M1w	M'	M2w	T'c
Numbering	783-1000	787-1000	786-1500	785-1000	785-1300	786-1000	787-1400	775-1000	776-1000	777-1000	786-1700	785-1600	785-1500	786-1200	787-1500	784-1000
Seating capacity	65	100	85	100	90	100	75	68	64	68	63	100	90	100	80	75
Facilities	Toilets		Toilets, smoking room	Telephone	Toilets		Toilets, smoking room	Conductor's office	Toilets, telephone	Smoking room	Toilets, wheelchair space, multi-purpose room	Telephone	Toilets		Toilets, smoking room, telephone	

Cars 5 and 12 each have one single-arm pantograph.

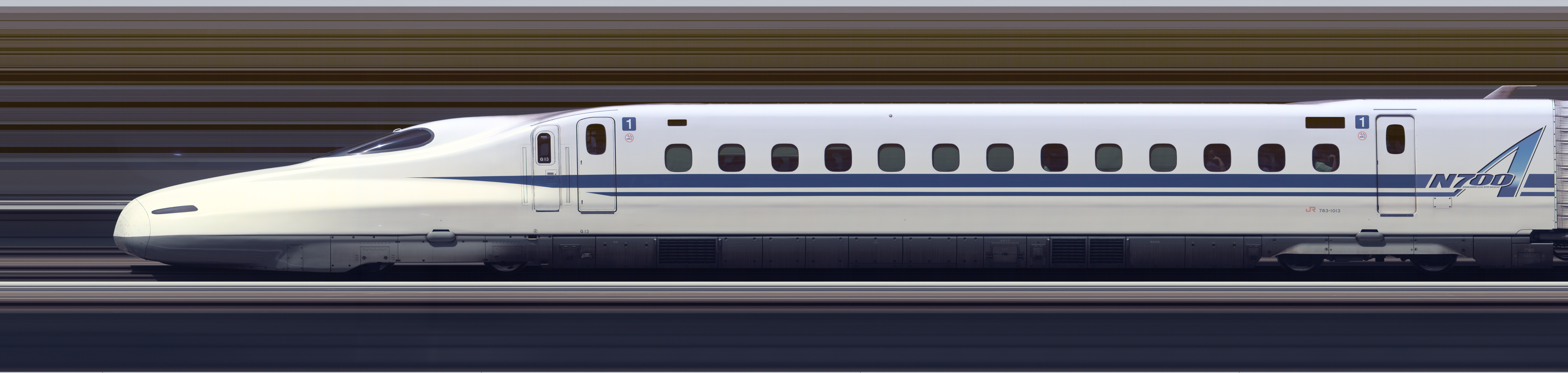
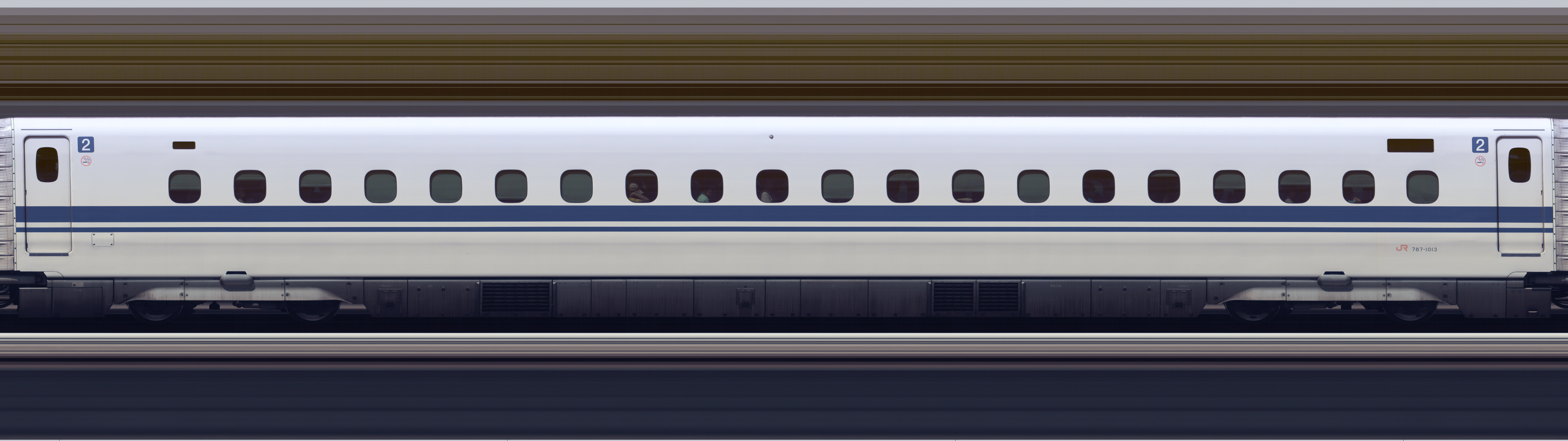
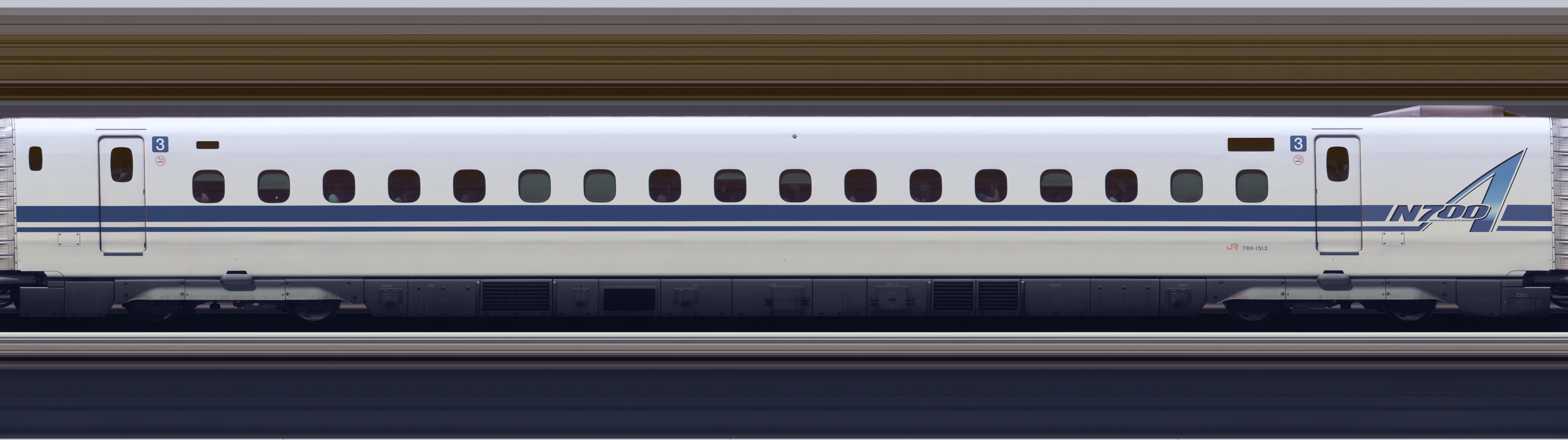
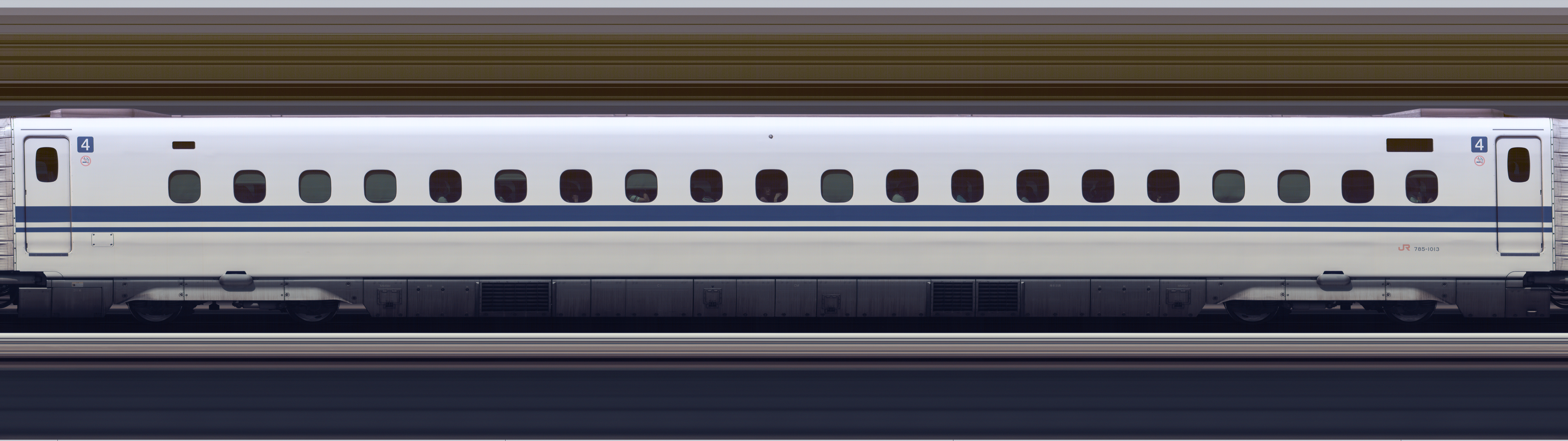
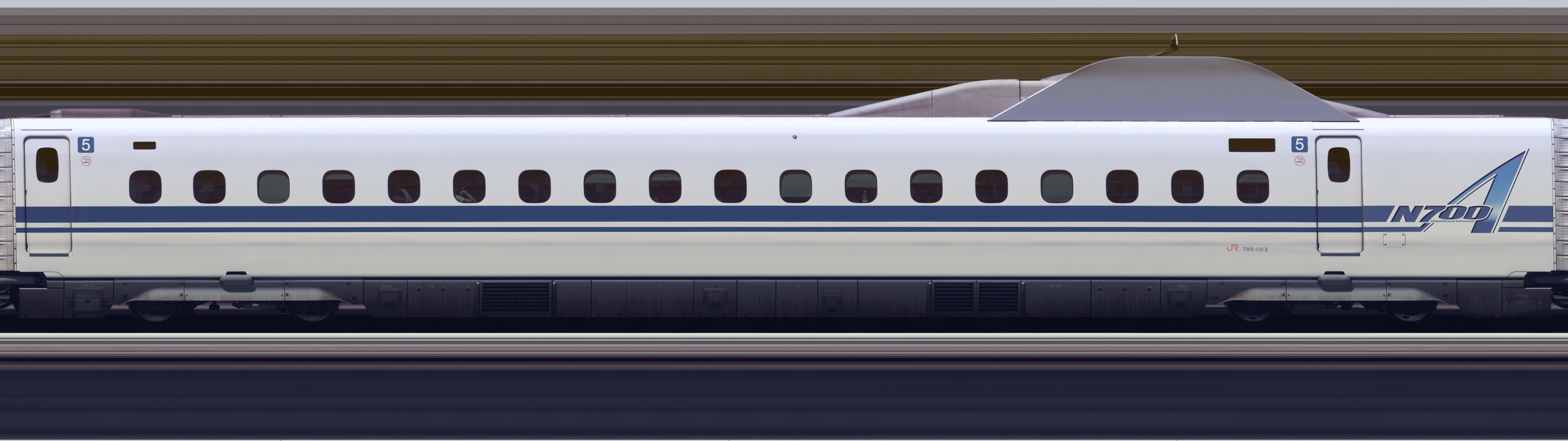
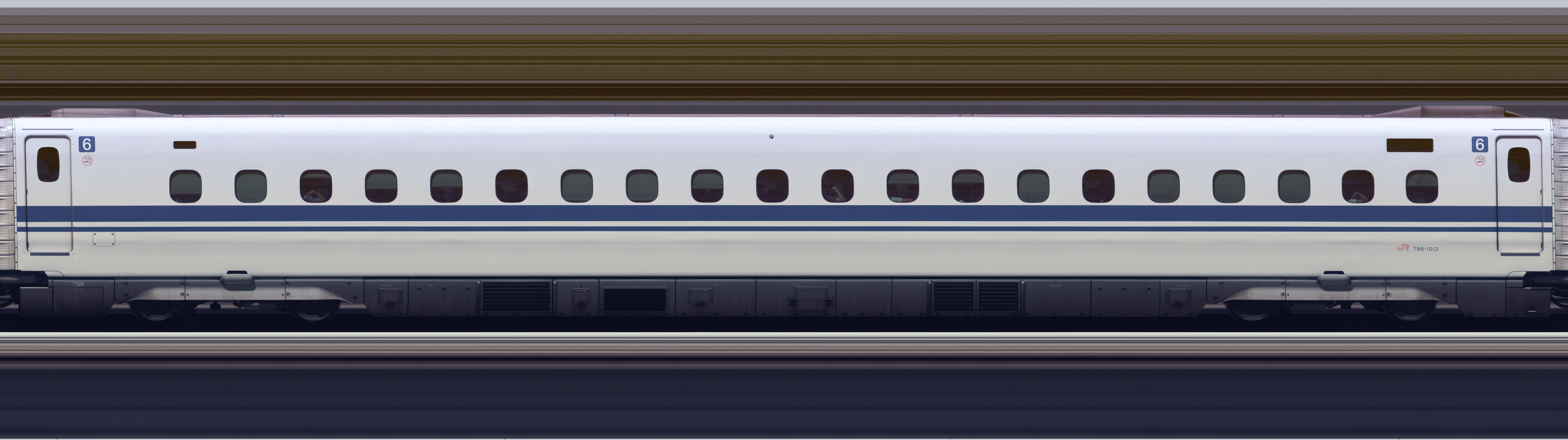
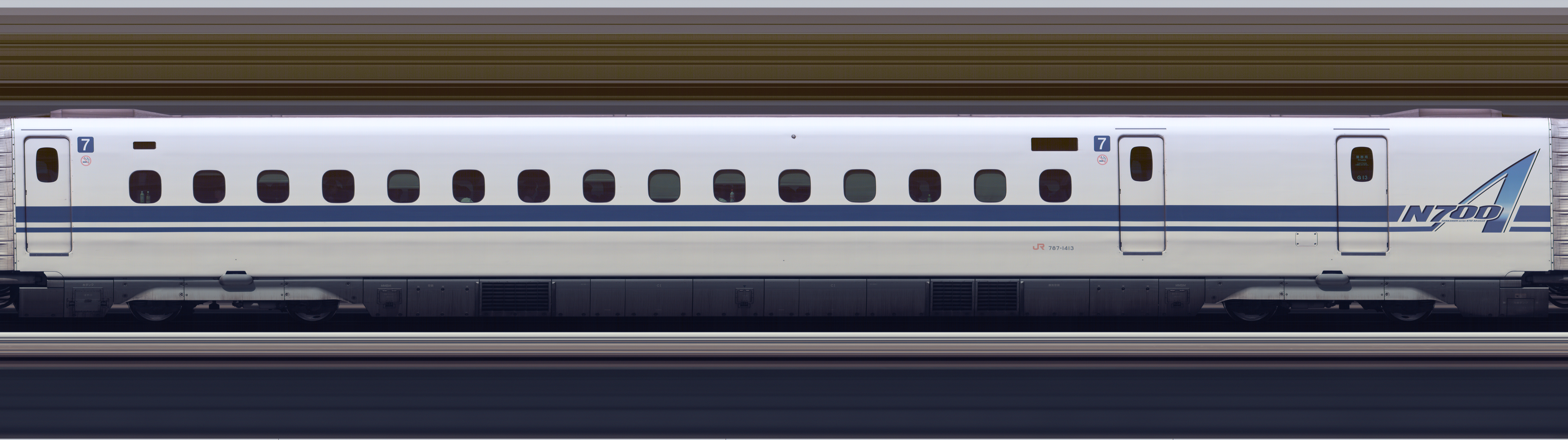
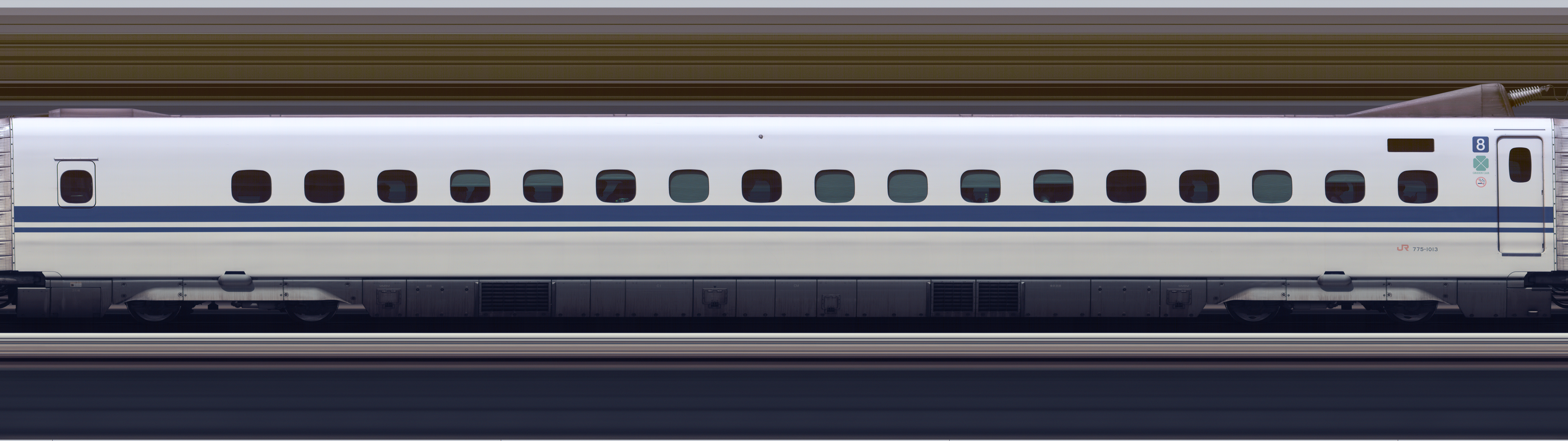
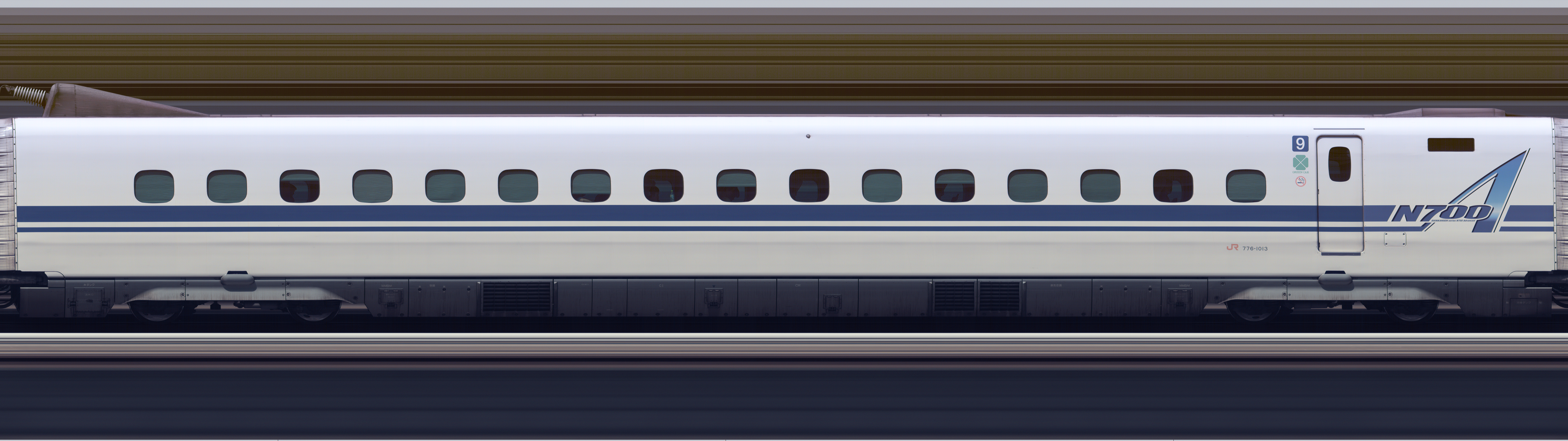
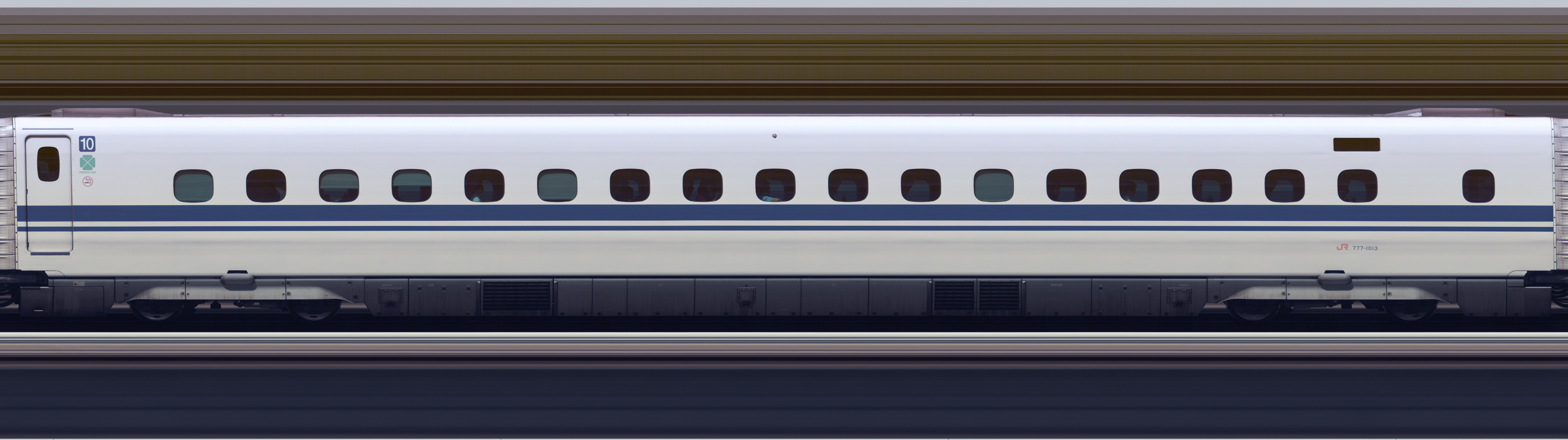
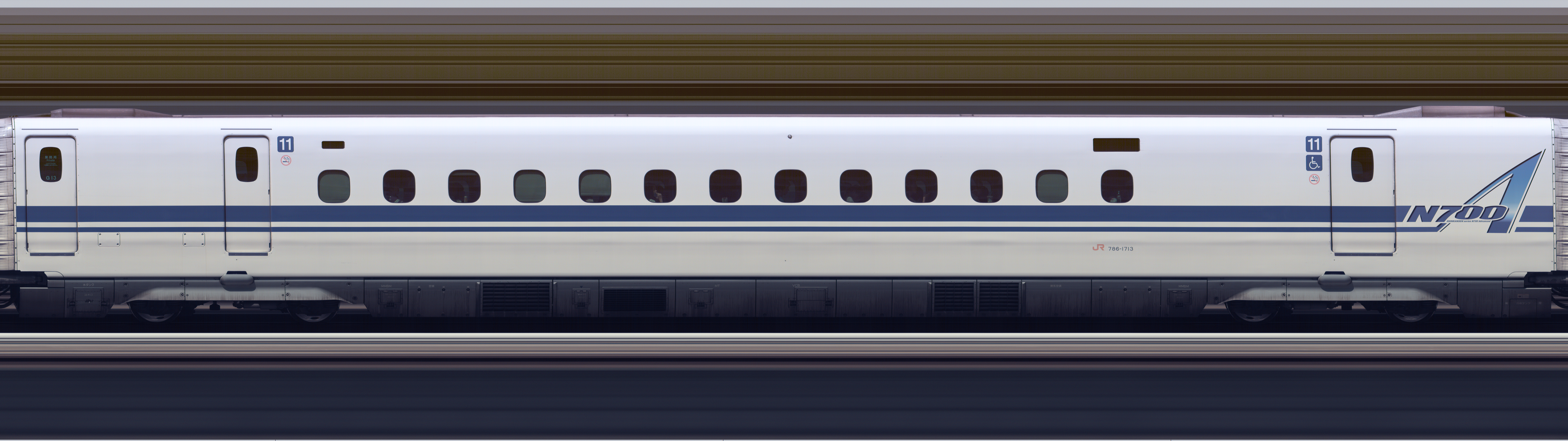
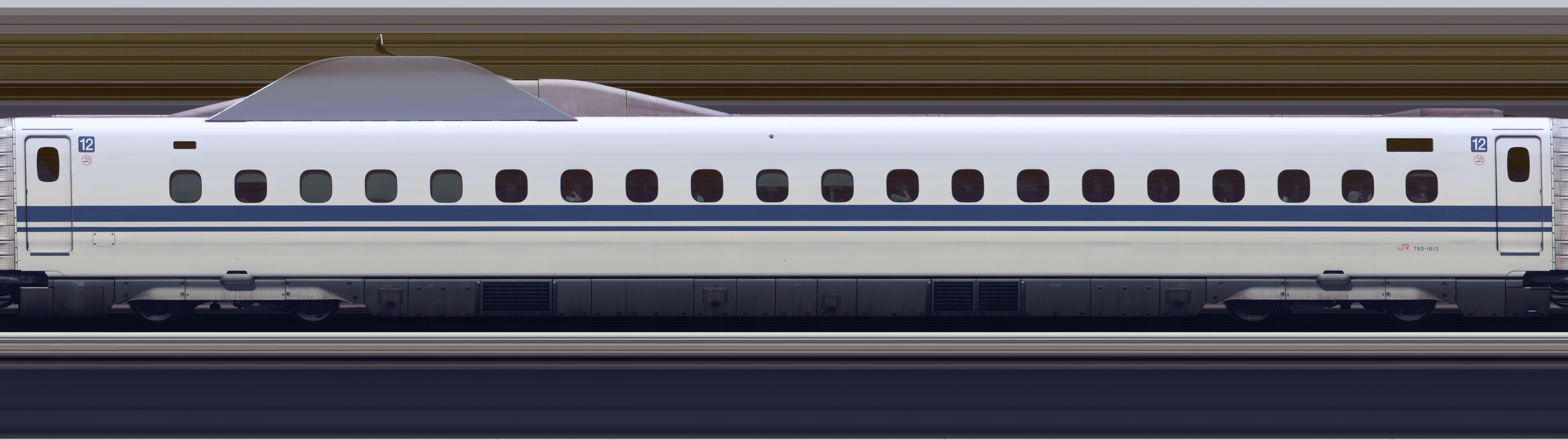
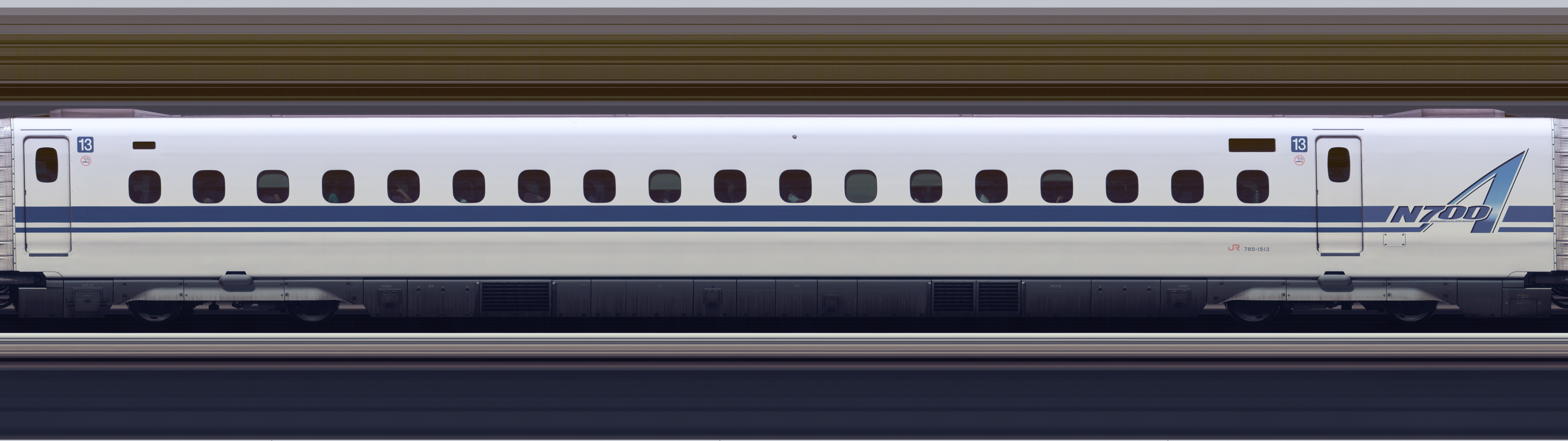
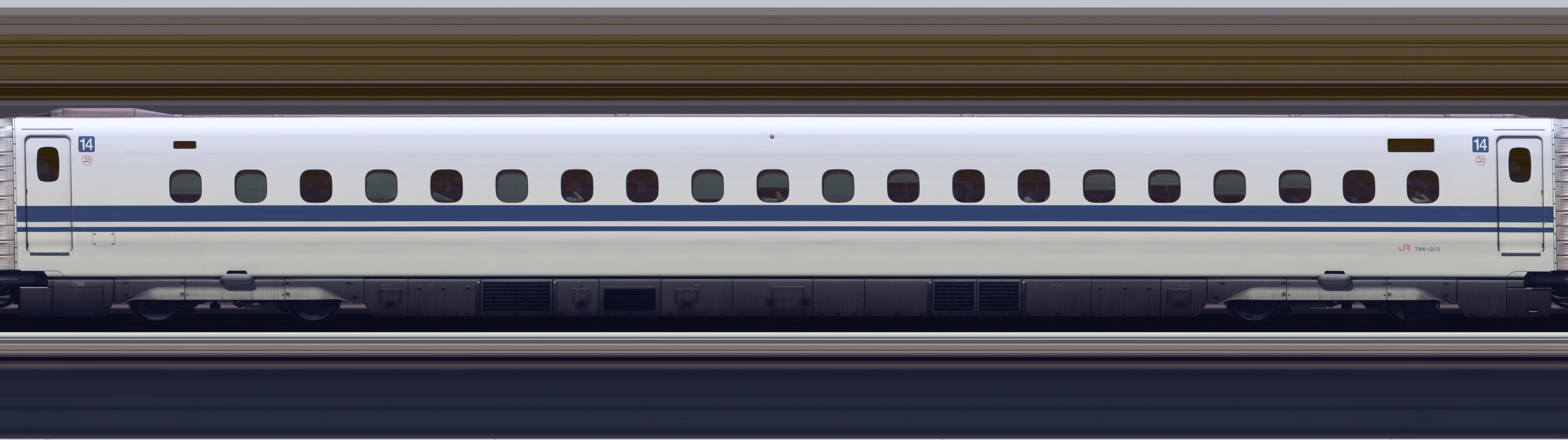
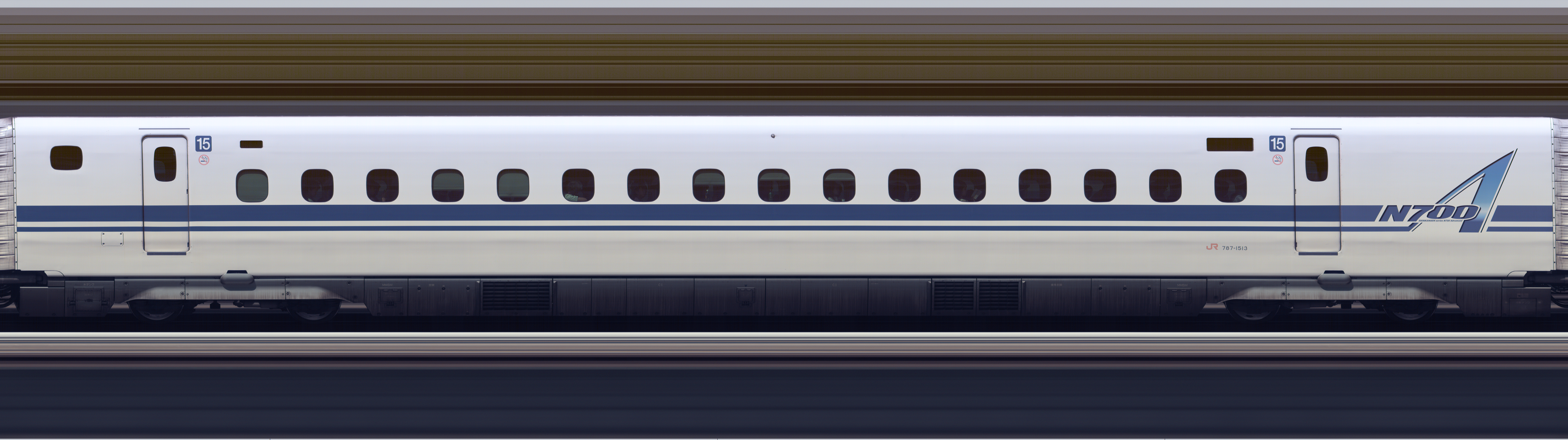
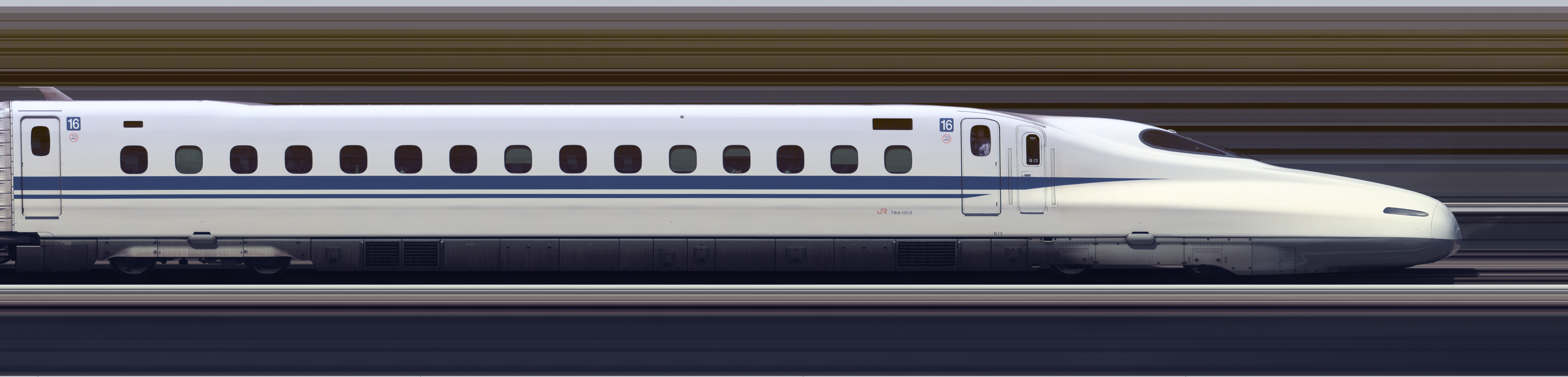

=== Interior ===
Internally, seats have new moquette seat covers, and LED lighting is used in toilets and washing areas.

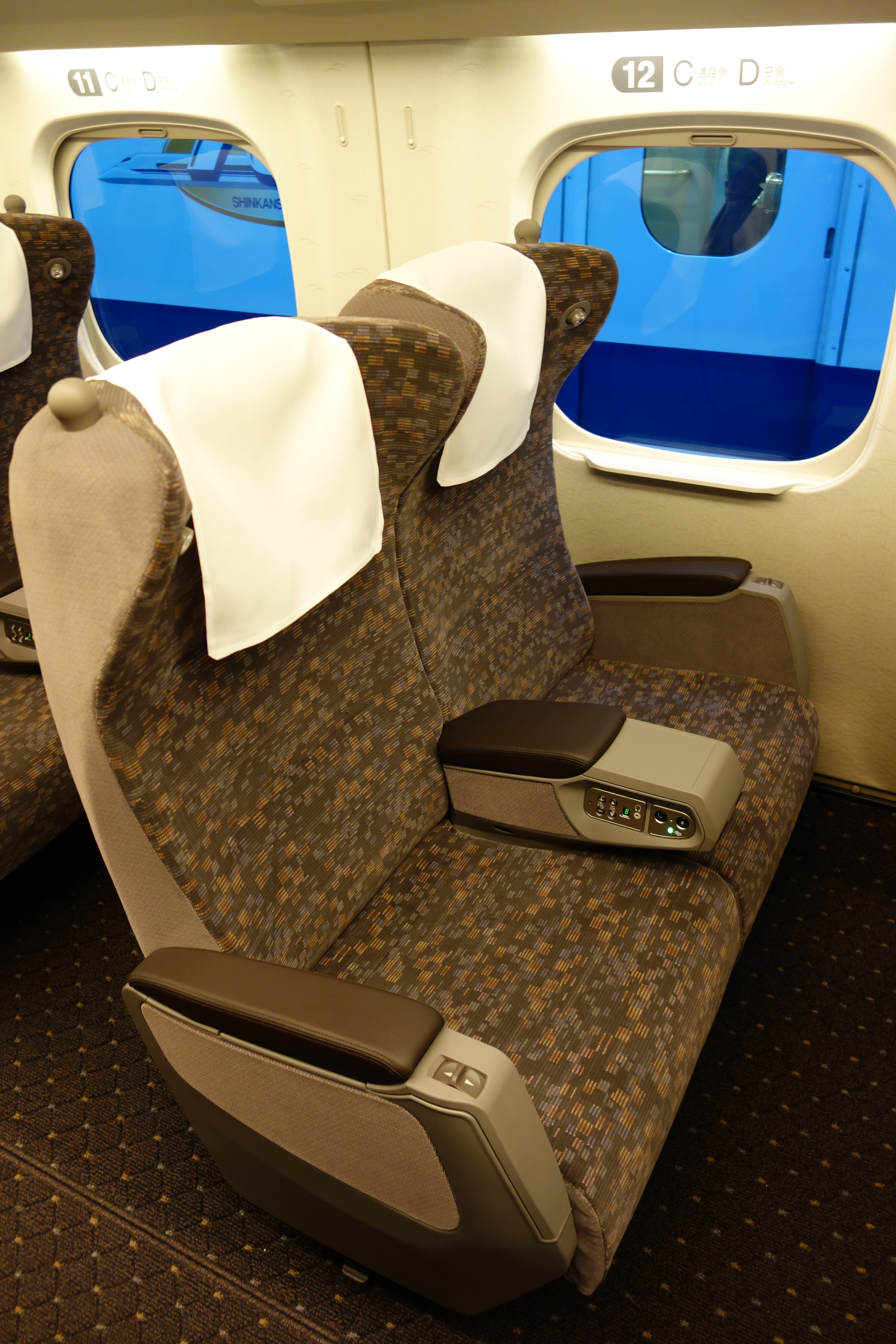
Green car seating (car 10), February 2012

=== Fleet list ===
As of 1 April 2020, the N700A series G set fleet is as follows.

Set No.	Manufacturer	Date delivered	Remarks
G1	Nippon Sharyo	25 August 2012	Fiscal 2012 batch
G2	Hitachi	7 November 2012	Fiscal 2012 batch
G3	Nippon Sharyo	16 November 2012	Fiscal 2012 batch
G4	Nippon Sharyo	22 January 2013	Fiscal 2012 batch
G5	Hitachi	30 January 2013	Fiscal 2012 batch
G6	Nippon Sharyo	22 February 2013	Fiscal 2012 batch
G7	Hitachi	17 April 2013	Fiscal 2013 batch
G8	Nippon Sharyo	11 July 2013	Fiscal 2013 batch
G9	Nippon Sharyo	20 September 2013	Fiscal 2013 batch
G10	Nippon Sharyo	29 October 2013	Fiscal 2013 batch
G11	Nippon Sharyo	11 December 2013	Fiscal 2013 batch
G12	Nippon Sharyo	21 January 2014	Fiscal 2013 batch
G13	Nippon Sharyo	21 February 2014	Fiscal 2013 batch
G14	Nippon Sharyo	4 July 2014	Fiscal 2014 batch
G15	Hitachi	31 July 2014	Fiscal 2014 batch
G16	Nippon Sharyo	22 August 2014	Fiscal 2014 batch
G17	Nippon Sharyo	21 October 2014	Fiscal 2014 batch
G18	Hitachi	3 December 2014	Fiscal 2014 batch
G19	Nippon Sharyo	17 February 2015	Fiscal 2014 batch
G20	Nippon Sharyo	14 April 2015	Fiscal 2015 batch
G21	Hitachi	11 June 2015	Fiscal 2015 batch
G22	Nippon Sharyo	28 August 2015	Fiscal 2015 batch
G23	Nippon Sharyo	20 October 2015	Fiscal 2015 batch
G24	Hitachi	16 December 2015	Fiscal 2015 batch
G25	Nippon Sharyo	16 February 2016	Fiscal 2015 batch
G26	Hitachi	6 April 2016	Fiscal 2016 batch
G27	Nippon Sharyo	10 June 2016	Fiscal 2016 batch
G28	Nippon Sharyo	30 August 2016	Fiscal 2016 batch
G29	Hitachi	19 October 2016	Fiscal 2016 batch
G30	Nippon Sharyo	1 November 2016	Fiscal 2016 batch
G31	Nippon Sharyo	13 December 2016	Fiscal 2016 batch
G32	Nippon Sharyo	7 March 2017	Fiscal 2016 batch
G33	Nippon Sharyo	21 April 2017	Fiscal 2017 batch
G34	Nippon Sharyo	13 June 2017	Fiscal 2017 batch
G35	Nippon Sharyo	19 July 2017	Fiscal 2017 batch
G36	Hitachi	5 September 2017	Fiscal 2017 batch
G37	Nippon Sharyo	17 October 2017	Fiscal 2017 batch
G38	Nippon Sharyo	5 December 2017	Fiscal 2017 batch
G39	Nippon Sharyo	16 January 2018	Fiscal 2017 batch
G40	Nippon Sharyo	8 June 2018	Fiscal 2018 batch
G41	Nippon Sharyo	13 October 2018	Fiscal 2018 batch
G42	Hitachi	20 July 2018	Fiscal 2018 batch
G43	Hitachi	18 September 2018	Fiscal 2018 batch
G44	Nippon Sharyo	8 January 2019	Fiscal 2018 batch
G45	Nippon Sharyo	15 February 2019	Fiscal 2018 batch
G46	Nippon Sharyo	23 March 2019	Fiscal 2018 batch
G47	Hitachi	19 April 2019	Fiscal 2019 batch
G48	Nippon Sharyo	7 June 2019	Fiscal 2019 batch
G49	Hitachi	16 July 2019	Fiscal 2019 batch
G50	Nippon Sharyo	17 September 2019	Fiscal 2019 batch
G51	Hitachi	21 February 2020	Fiscal 2019 batch

== 16-car X sets (N700-2000 series "N700A") ==
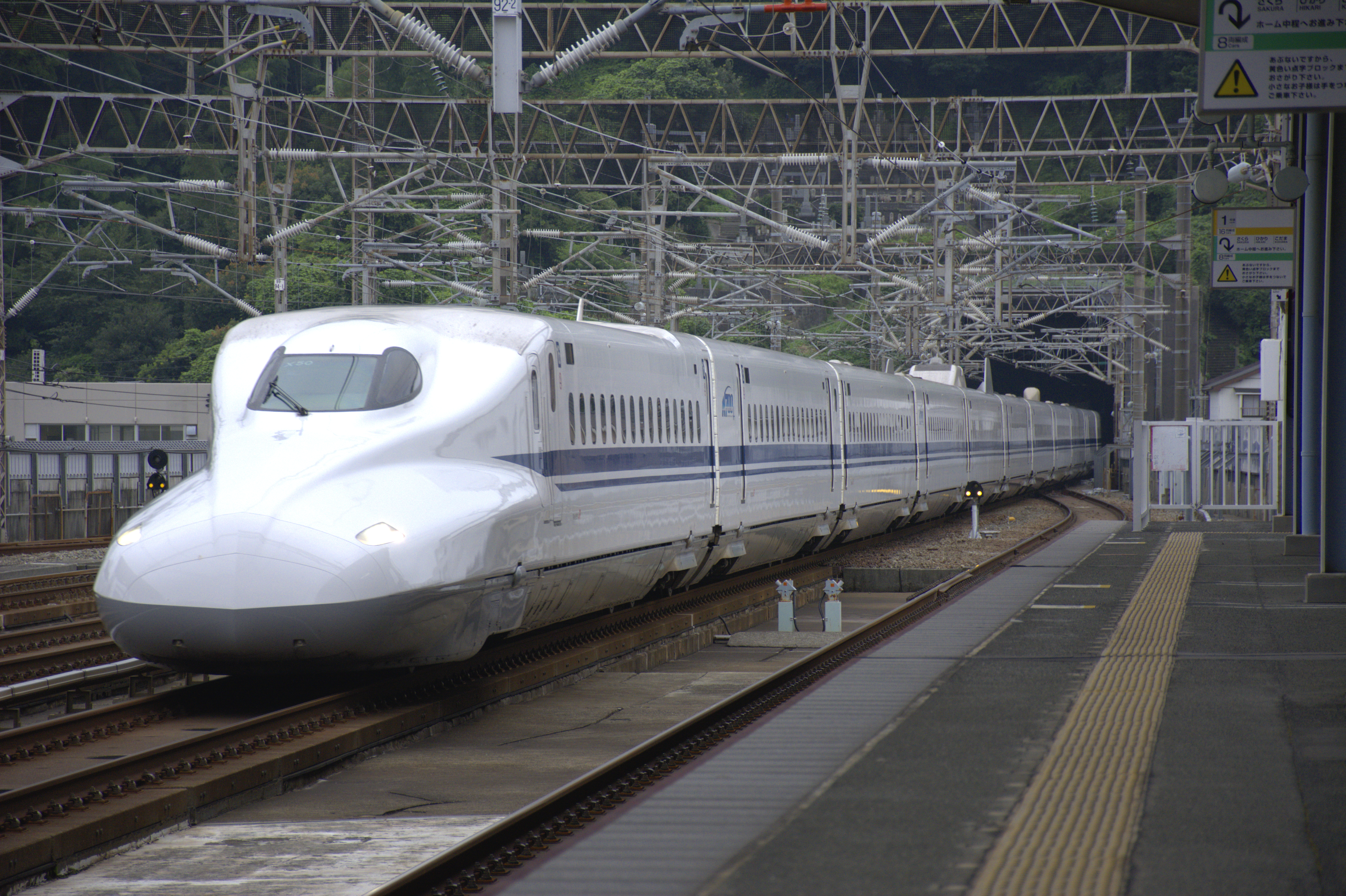
JR Central N700-2000 series set X50, September 2014

- 81 x 16-car sets, X0–X80 (converted from N700-0 series)

These are former N700 series Z sets modified between 2013 and August 2015 to incorporate some of the design improvements featured in the later N700A series sets. Cars are renumbered in the -2000 subseries, with the exception of set X0, which is still numbered in the -9000 subseries. The sets are also identified by the addition of a small "A" added to the right of the bodyside "N700" logos. The prototype 16-car train (Z0) was delivered in March 2005 for extensive testing and endurance running. Cars 1 to 4 were built by Hitachi, cars 5 to 14 were built by Nippon Sharyo, and cars 15 and 16 were built by Kawasaki Heavy Industries. It was initially fitted with two auxiliary headlights located below the nose.

The first full-production Z set (Z1) was delivered to JR Central in April 2007, and trains entered revenue service on 1 July 2007, with eight daily Nozomi service runs. The final Z set, Z80, was delivered from Kawasaki Heavy Industries in February 2012.

From fiscal 2013, the fleet of Z sets underwent modifications to incorporate some of the improvements featured in the later N700A series sets. Modified sets were re-designated "X" sets, with cars renumbered in the -2000 subseries. The modified sets are also identified by the addition of a small "A" added to the right of the bodyside "N700" logos. The first original "Z" set, set Z65, was modified to become set X65 in May 2013, with the last original "Z" set, set Z4, modified to become set X4 in August 2015.

The prototype set Z0 was used as a JR Central test train with cars numbered in the -9000 series, and was not used in revenue service. It was renumbered set X0 in 2014, but the car numbers remained in the -9000 subseries. The set was officially withdrawn from service in February 2019.

Withdrawals of N700 series X sets commenced in July 2020, beginning with set X12.

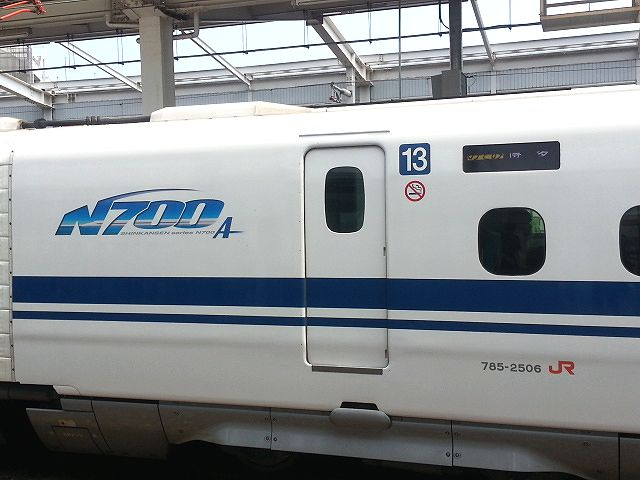
The modified logo on the side of set X6, August 2013

=== Former Z sets ===
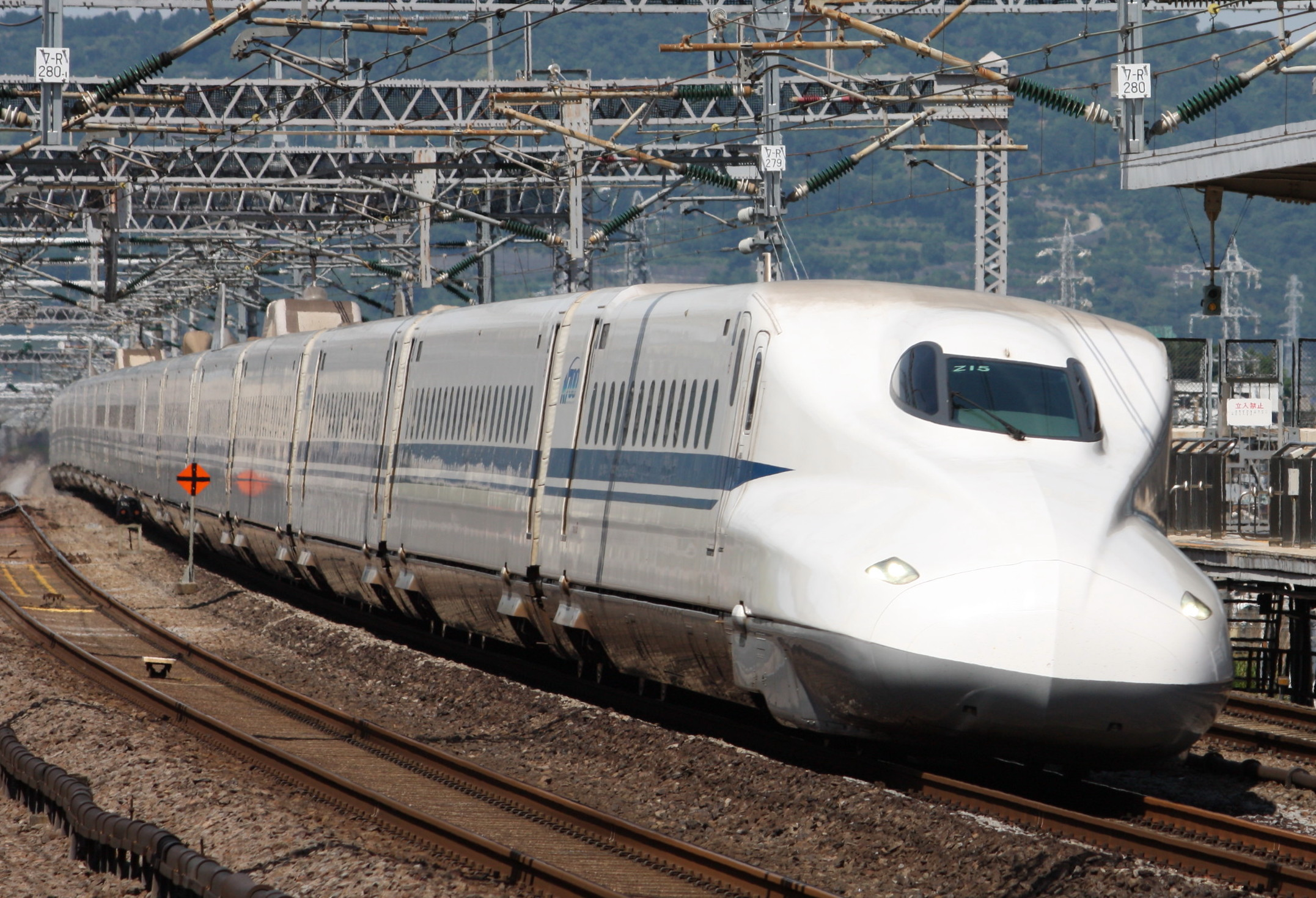
Set Z15, June 2008

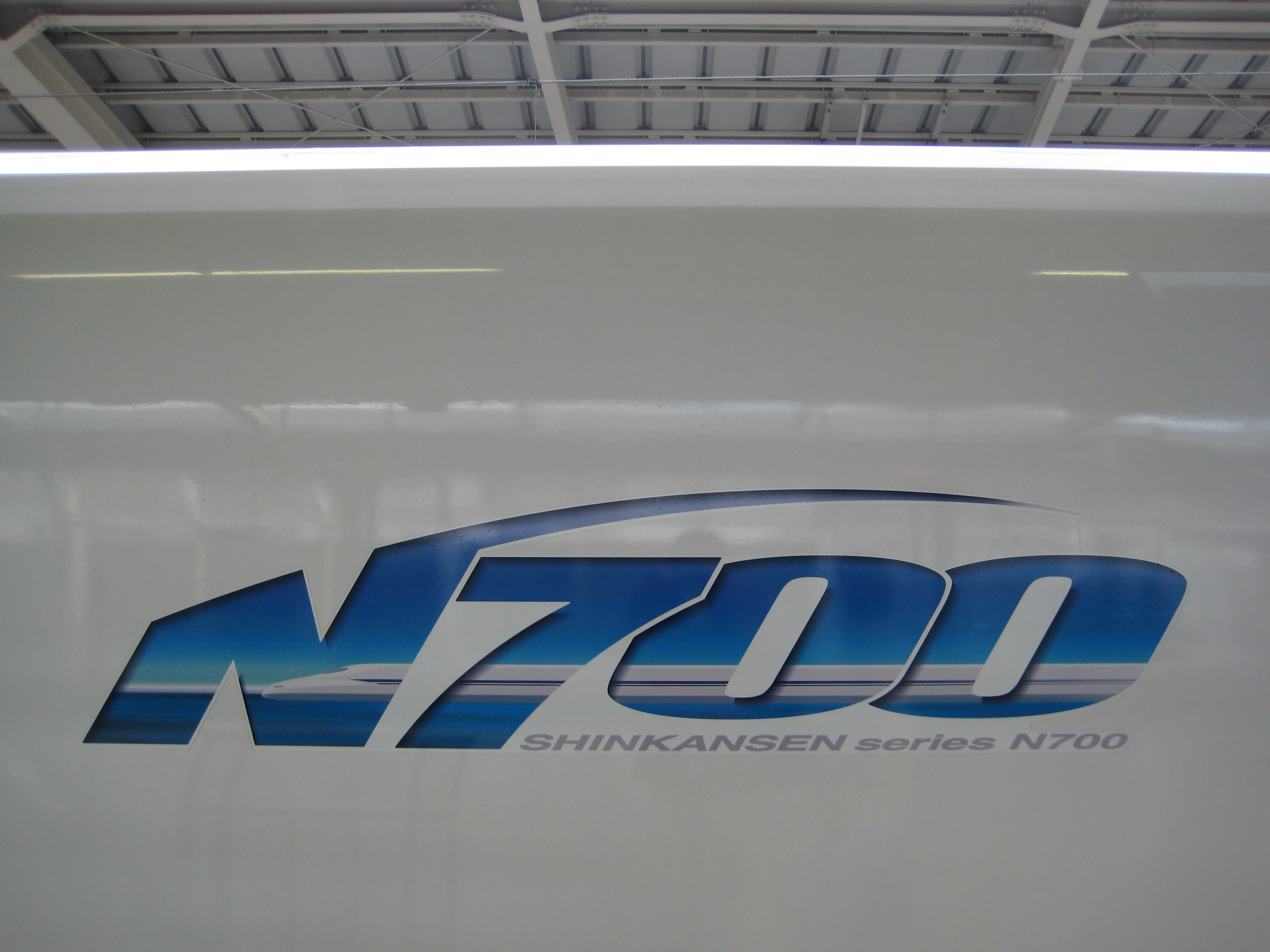
The original "N700" logo, February 2011

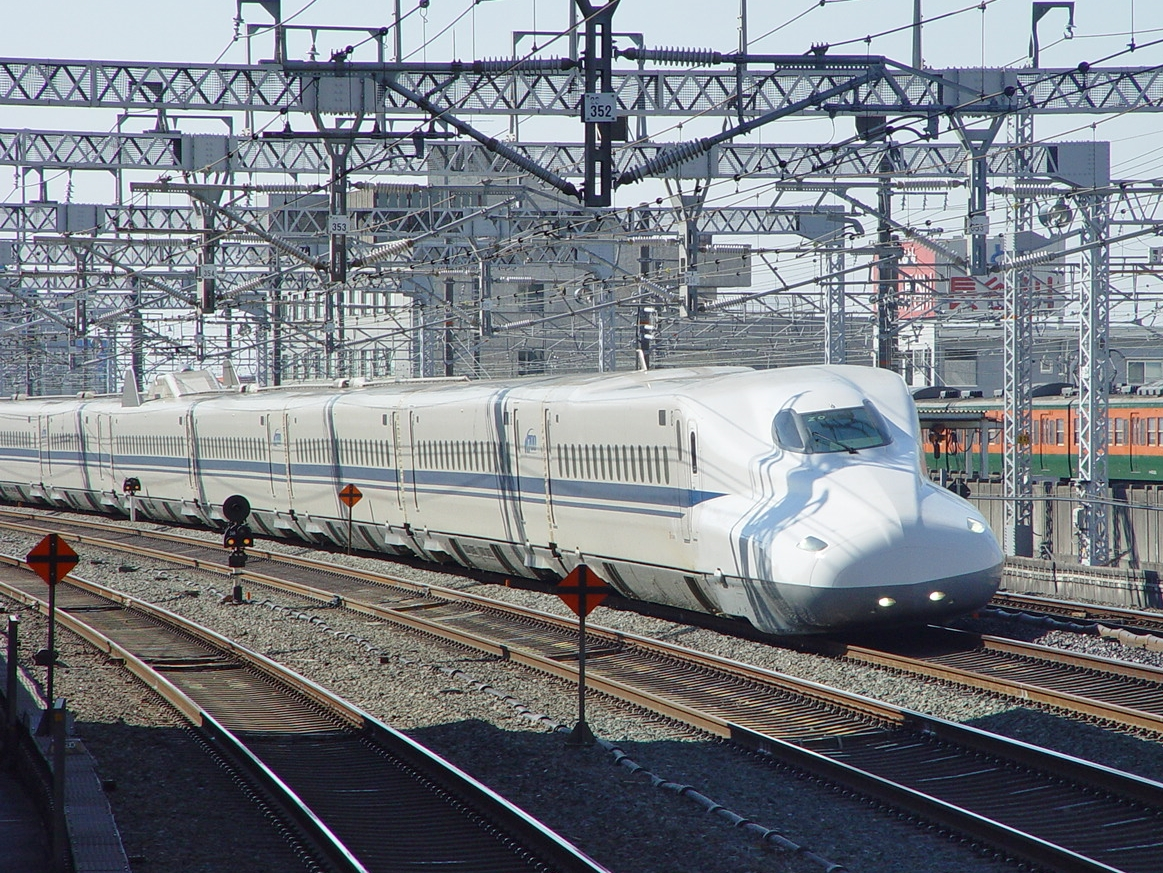
N700 series prototype set Z0 on a test run at Hamamatsu, January 2006

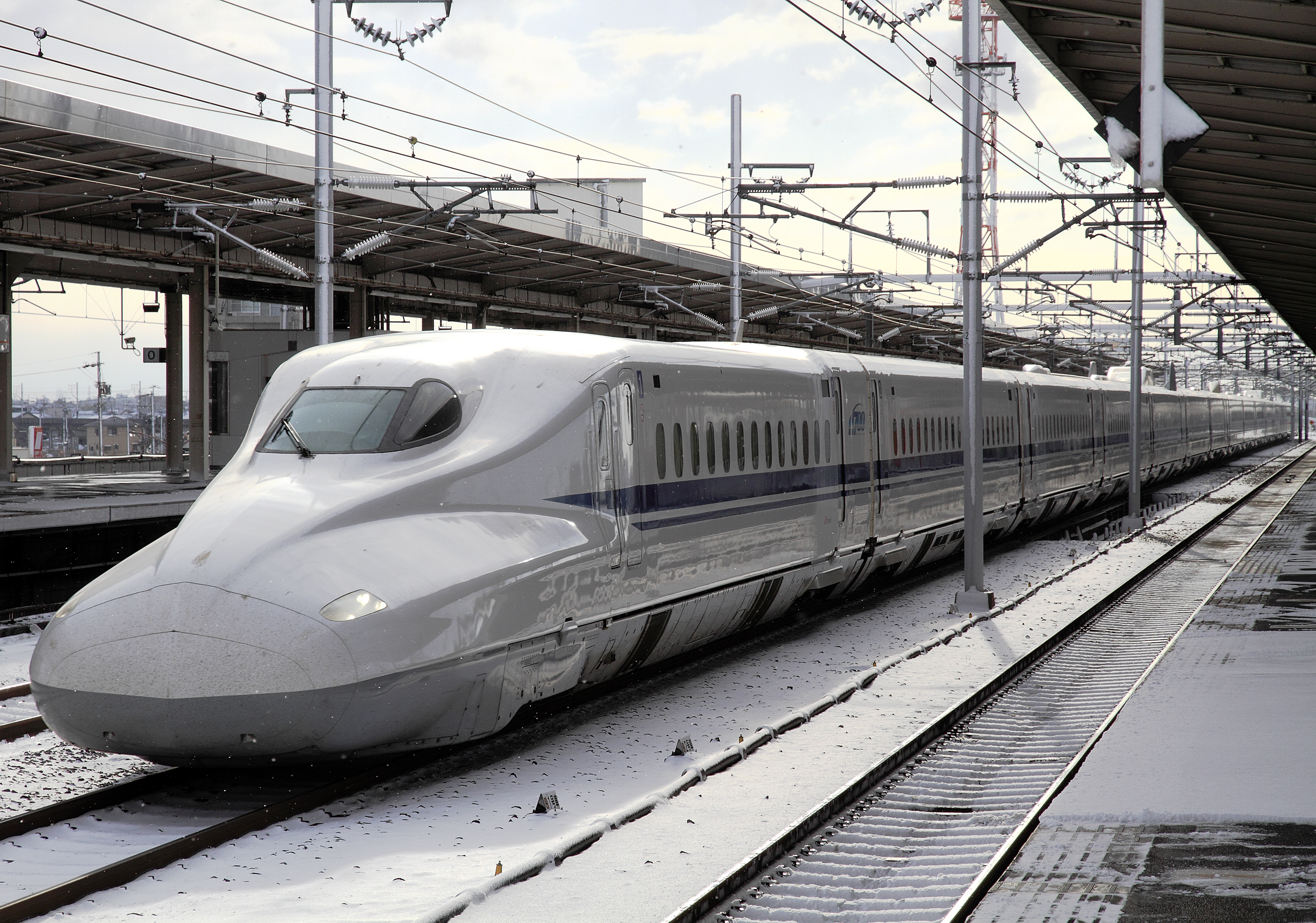
Set Z0, January 2011

=== Formation ===
The 16-car X sets are formed as follows.

Car No.	1	2	3	4	5	6	7	8	9	10	11	12	13	14	15	16
Designation	Tc	M2	M'w	M1	M1w	M'	M2k	M1s	M's	M2s	M'h	M1	M1w	M'	M2w	T'c
Numbering	783-2000	787-2000	786-2500	785-2000	785-2300	786-2000	787-2400	775-2000	776-2000	777-2000	786-2700	785-2600	785-2500	786-2200	787-2500	784-2000
Seating capacity	65	100	85	100	90	100	75	68	64	68	63	100	90	100	80	75
Facilities	Toilets		Toilets, smoking room	Telephone	Toilets		Toilets, smoking room	Conductor's office	Toilets, telephone	Smoking room	Toilets, wheelchair space, multi-purpose room	Telephone	Toilets		Toilets, smoking room, telephone	

==== Former Z set formation ====
Car No.	1	2	3	4	5	6	7	8	9	10	11	12	13	14	15	16
Designation	Tc	M2	M'w	M1	M1w	M'	M2k	M1s	M's	M2s	M'h	M1	M1w	M'	M2w	T'c
Numbering	783	787	786-500	785	785-300	786	787-400	775	776	777	786-700	785-600	785-500	786-200	787-500	784
Seating capacity	65	100	85	100	90	100	75	68	64	68	63	100	90	100	80	75
Facilities	Toilets		Toilets, smoking room	Telephone	Toilets		Toilets, smoking room	Conductor's office	Toilets, telephone	Smoking room	Toilets, wheelchair space, multi-purpose room	Telephone	Toilets		Toilets, smoking room, telephone	

Cars 5 and 12 each have one single-arm pantograph.

=== Interior ===
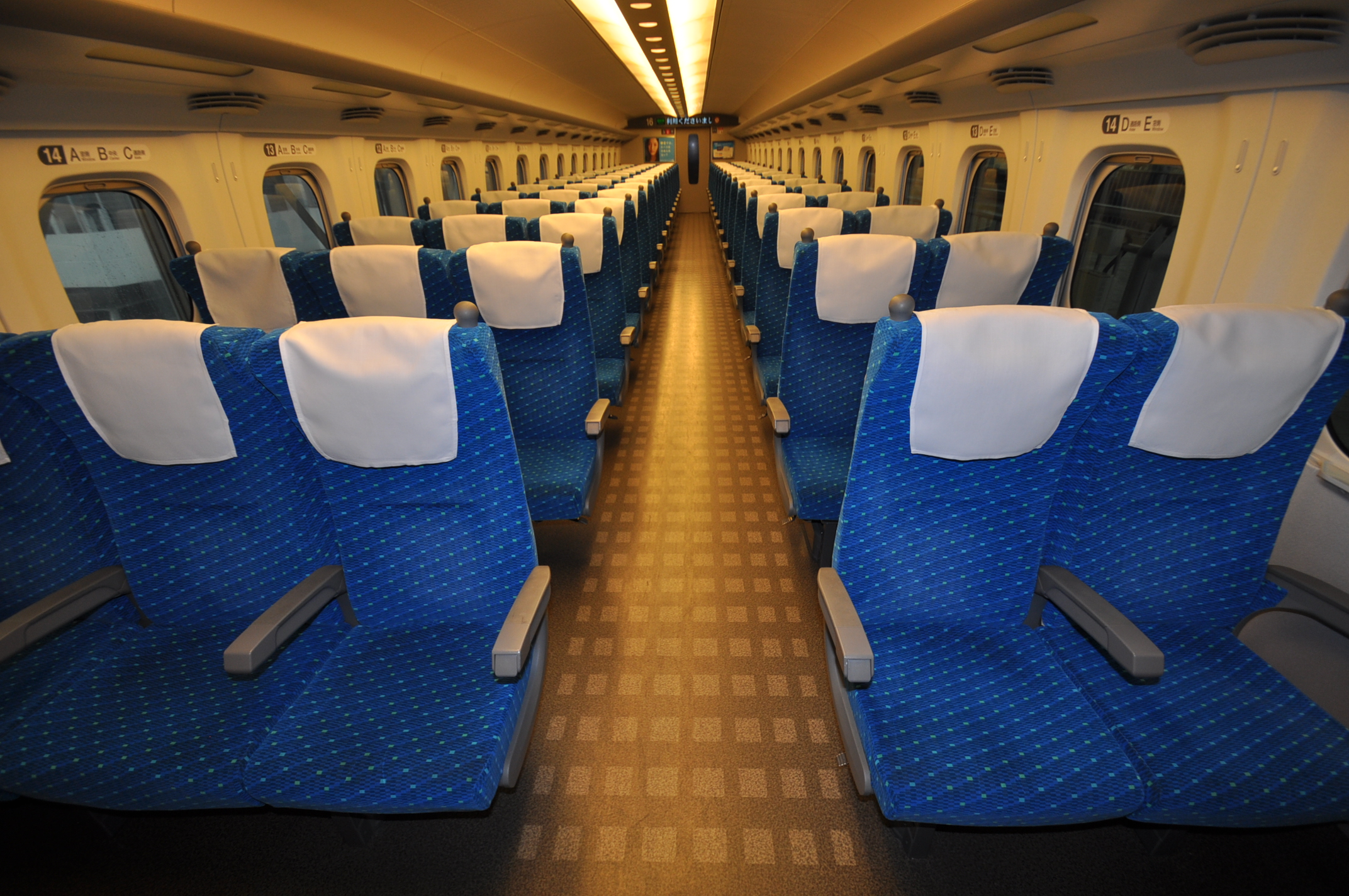
Standard-class car seating

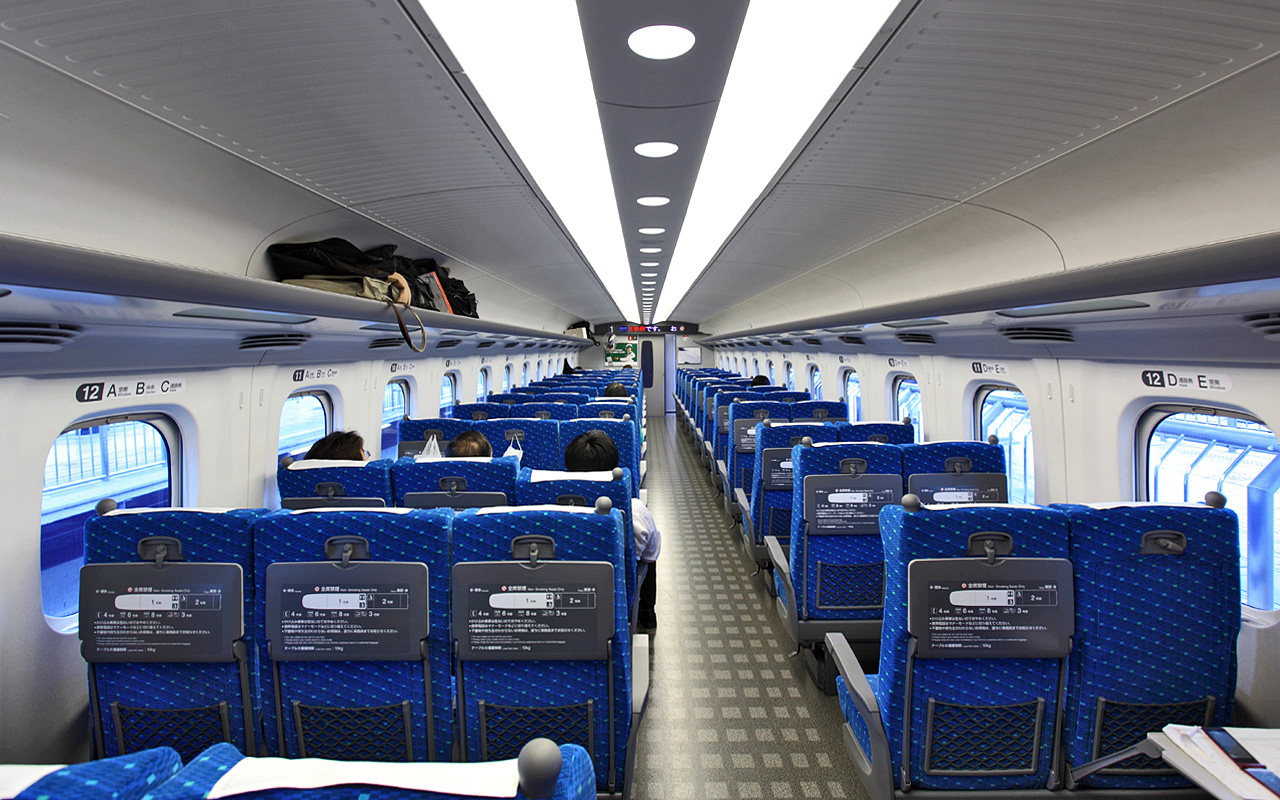
Z set standard-class car interior

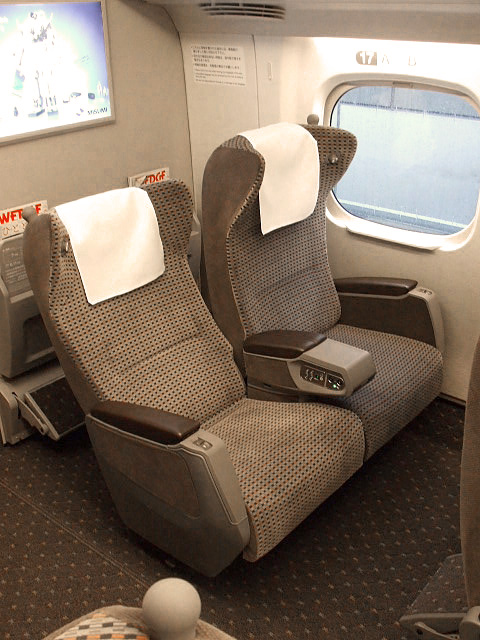
Z set Green car (first class) seating

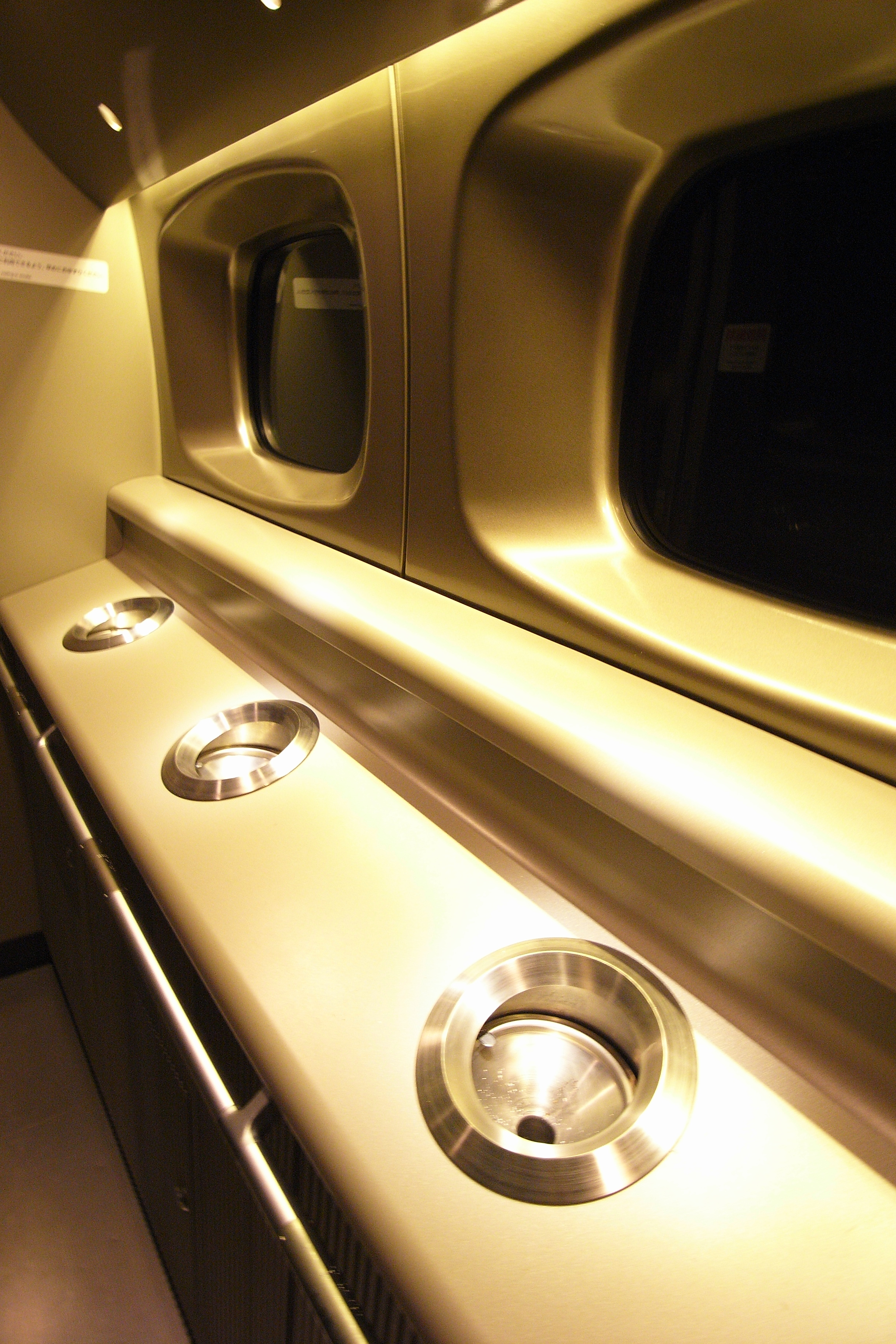
Interior of a smoking room

=== Fleet list ===
As of 28 January 2023, the JR Central N700A series fleet is as follows.

Set No.	Manufacturer	Date delivered	Date converted to N700A	Date withdrawn	Remarks
X0	Hitachi/Kawasaki HI/Nippon Sharyo	12 March 2005	12 May 2014	25 February 2019	Pre-series set
X1	Nippon Sharyo	17 April 2007	18 May 2015	4 October 2021	Full-production sets
X2	Hitachi	9 May 2007	9 June 2015	2 November 2021	Full-production sets
X3	Nippon Sharyo	21 May 2007	15 June 2015	2 December 2021	Full-production sets
X4	Hitachi	16 June 2007	5 August 2015	4 January 2022	Full-production sets
X5	Nippon Sharyo	23 June 2007	7 July 2015	7 February 2022	Full-production sets
X6	Hitachi	5 September 2007	16 July 2013	2 March 2022	Full-production sets
X7	Nippon Sharyo	12 September 2007	12 August 2013	19 April 2022	Full-production sets
X8	Hitachi	31 October 2007	28 August 2013	13 May 2022	Full-production sets
X9	Nippon Sharyo	22 October 2007	21 October 2013	13 July 2022	Full-production sets
X10	Hitachi	6 December 2007	25 October 2013	16 August 2022	Full-production sets
X11	Nippon Sharyo	29 November 2007	11 December 2013	12 September 2022	Full-production sets
X12	Kawasaki HI	9 January 2008	21 January 2014	2 July 2020	Full-production sets
X13	Nippon Sharyo	16 January 2008	31 January 2014	1 September 2020	Full-production sets
X14	Hitachi	6 February 2008	27 February 2014	26 September 2020	Full-production sets
X15	Nippon Sharyo	21 February 2008	16 May 2014	21 October 2020	Full-production sets
X16	Hitachi	5 March 2008	22 May 2014	18 November 2020	Full-production sets
X17	Nippon Sharyo	8 May 2008	3 June 2014	14 December 2020	Full-production sets
X18	Hitachi	15 May 2008	19 June 2014	25 April 2023	Full-production sets
X19	Nippon Sharyo	12 June 2008	1 July 2014	14 January 2021	Full-production sets
X20	Hitachi	2 July 2008	7 July 2014	24 May 2023	Full-production sets
X21	Nippon Sharyo	17 July 2008	24 July 2014	21 May 2021	Full-production sets
X22	Hitachi	6 August 2008	7 August 2014	12 February 2021	Full-production sets
X23	Nippon Sharyo	27 August 2008	8 September 2014	16 March 2021	Full-production sets
X24	Hitachi	17 September 2008	12 September 2014	16 April 2021	Full-production sets
X25	Nippon Sharyo	3 October 2008	21 October 2014	7 June 2021	Full-production sets
X26	Kawasaki HI	16 November 2008	29 November 2014	5 August 2021	Full-production sets
X27	Nippon Sharyo	9 November 2008	27 October 2014	14 May 2021	Full-production sets
X28	Hitachi	21 December 2008	4 December 2014	8 July 2021	Full-production sets
X29	Nippon Sharyo	14 December 2008	28 January 2015	7 September 2021	Full-production sets
X30	Kawasaki HI	11 February 2009	22 December 2014	12 October 2023	Full-production sets
X31	Nippon Sharyo	24 January 2009	16 December 2014	5 January 2025	Full-production sets
X32	Nippon Sharyo	1 March 2009	9 February 2015	27 March 2024	Full-production sets
X33	Hitachi	15 April 2009	22 May 2015	6 June 2024	Full-production sets
X34	Nippon Sharyo	3 April 2009	3 February 2015	8 March 2024	Full-production sets
X35	Nippon Sharyo	13 May 2009	3 June 2015	1 October 2024	Full-production sets
X36	Kawasaki HI	26 August 2009	22 July 2013	24 July 2024	Full-production sets
X37	Nippon Sharyo	18 June 2009	19 June 2015	2 September 2024	Full-production sets
X38	Nippon Sharyo	24 July 2009	9 July 2013	9 January 2025	Full-production sets
X39	Nippon Sharyo	3 September 2009	27 July 2013	30 March 2022	Full-production sets
X40	Hitachi	8 July 2009	19 June 2013	29 November 2024	Full-production sets
X41	Nippon Sharyo	11 October 2009	27 September 2013	3 June 2022	Full-production sets
X42	Nippon Sharyo	14 November 2009	13 November 2013	10 March 2025	Full-production sets
X43	Hitachi	1 December 2009	21 December 2013	11 October 2022	Full-production sets
X44	Nippon Sharyo	17 December 2009	27 January 2014	11 November 2022	Full-production sets
X45	Hitachi	13 January 2010	5 March 2014	13 December 2022	Full-production sets
X46	Nippon Sharyo	27 January 2010	15 March 2014	15 December 2023	Full-production sets
X47	Hitachi	17 February 2010	20 March 2014	12 January 2023	Full-production sets
X48	Nippon Sharyo	1 March 2010	9 April 2014	25 February 2023	Full-production sets
X49	Nippon Sharyo	2 April 2010	28 May 2014	23 March 2023	Full-production sets
X50	Nippon Sharyo	9 May 2010	25 June 2014	3 July 2025	Full-production sets
X51	Nippon Sharyo	9 June 2010	18 July 2014	19 August 2025	Full-production sets
X52	Nippon Sharyo	10 July 2010	31 July 2014		Full-production sets
X53	Hitachi	21 July 2010	22 August 2014		Full-production sets
X54	Nippon Sharyo	18 August 2010	27 September 2014		Full-production sets
X55	Nippon Sharyo	18 September 2010	19 September 2014		Full-production sets
X56	Hitachi	1 October 2010	15 October 2014		Full-production sets
X57	Nippon Sharyo	21 October 2010	31 October 2014		Full-production sets
X58	Hitachi	10 November 2010	18 November 2014		Full-production sets
X59	Nippon Sharyo	21 November 2010	12 December 2014		Full-production sets
X60	Nippon Sharyo	22 December 2010	25 November 2014		Full-production sets
X61	Hitachi	19 January 2011	22 January 2015		Full-production sets
X62	Nippon Sharyo	28 January 2011	19 March 2015		Full-production sets
X63	Hitachi	23 February 2011	25 March 2015		Full-production sets
X64	Nippon Sharyo	3 March 2011	25 April 2015		Full-production sets
X65	Nippon Sharyo	6 April 2011	7 May 2013		Full-production sets
X66	Hitachi	20 April 2011	14 July 2015		Full-production sets
X67	Nippon Sharyo	13 May 2011	1 July 2015		Full-production sets
X68	Nippon Sharyo	15 June 2011	27 June 2013		Full-production sets
X69	Nippon Sharyo	16 July 2011	23 August 2013		Full-production sets
X70	Hitachi	3 August 2011	12 September 2013		Full-production sets
X71	Nippon Sharyo	20 August 2011	19 September 2013		Full-production sets
X72	Hitachi	7 September 2011	15 October 2013		Full-production sets
X73	Nippon Sharyo	22 September 2011	29 November 2013		Full-production sets
X74	Nippon Sharyo	24 October 2011	5 December 2013		Full-production sets
X75	Hitachi	3 November 2011	17 December 2013		Full-production sets
X76	Nippon Sharyo	23 November 2011	27 December 2013		Full-production sets
X77	Nippon Sharyo	22 December 2011	21 February 2014		Full-production sets
X78	Nippon Sharyo	29 January 2012	11 March 2014		Full-production sets
X79	Hitachi	22 February 2012	15 April 2014		Full-production sets
X80	Nippon Sharyo	1 March 2012	21 April 2014		Full-production sets

== 16-car F sets (N700-4000 series "N700A") ==
These are N700A series sets owned by JR West and classified N700-4000 series, with one set (set F1) delivered in November 2013 and entering revenue service from 8 February 2014. A further four sets were delivered each in fiscal 2015 (sets F2 to F5) and fiscal 2016 (sets F6 to F9), followed by three in fiscal 2017 (sets F10 to F12), five in fiscal 2018 (sets F13 to F17), and seven in fiscal 2019 (sets F18 to F24).

=== Formation ===
The 16-car F sets are formed as follows.

Car No.	1	2	3	4	5	6	7	8	9	10	11	12	13	14	15	16
Designation	Tc	M2	M'w	M1	M1w	M'	M2k	M1s	M's	M2s	M'h	M1	M1w	M'	M2w	T'c
Numbering	783-4000	787-4000	786-4500	785-4000	785-4300	786-4000	787-4400	775-4000	776-4000	777-4000	786-4700	785-4600	785-4500	786-4200	787-4500	784-4000
Seating capacity	65	100	85	100	90	100	75	68	64	68	63	100	90	100	80	75
Facilities	Toilets		Toilets, smoking room	Telephone	Toilets		Toilets, smoking room	Conductor's office	Toilets, telephone	Smoking room	Toilets, wheelchair space, multi-purpose room	Telephone	Toilets		Toilets, smoking room, telephone	

=== Fleet list ===
As of 1 April 2020, the JR West N700A series fleet is as follows.

Set No.	Manufacturer	Date delivered	Remarks
F1	Hitachi	27 November 2013	Fiscal 2013 batch
F2	Nippon Sharyo	1 August 2015	Fiscal 2015 batch
F3	Hitachi	3 September 2015	Fiscal 2015 batch
F4	Hitachi	3 November 2015	Fiscal 2015 batch
F5	Nippon Sharyo	17 February 2016	Fiscal 2015 batch
F6	Nippon Sharyo	15 April 2016	Fiscal 2016 batch
F7	Hitachi	29 May 2016	Fiscal 2016 batch
F8	Hitachi	7 September 2016	Fiscal 2016 batch
F9	Nippon Sharyo	11 October 2016	Fiscal 2016 batch
F10	Nippon Sharyo	22 August 2017	Fiscal 2017 batch
F11	Nippon Sharyo	3 October 2017	Fiscal 2017 batch
F12	Hitachi	16 January 2018	Fiscal 2017 batch
F13	Hitachi	17 April 2018	Fiscal 2018 batch
F14	Hitachi	15 October 2018	Fiscal 2018 batch
F15	Nippon Sharyo	21 August 2018	Fiscal 2018 batch
F16	Hitachi	21 February 2019	Fiscal 2018 batch
F17	Nippon Sharyo	26 November 2018	Fiscal 2018 batch
F18	Hitachi	19 June 2019	Fiscal 2019 batch
F19	Nippon Sharyo	12 July 2019	Fiscal 2019 batch
F20	Hitachi	16 October 2019	Fiscal 2019 batch
F21	Nippon Sharyo	13 November 2019	Fiscal 2019 batch
F22	Hitachi	11 December 2019	Fiscal 2019 batch
F23	Hitachi	18 March 2020	Fiscal 2019 batch
F24	Nippon Sharyo	19 February 2020	Fiscal 2019 batch

== 16-car K sets (N700-5000 series "N700A") ==
- 16 x 16-car sets, K1–K16 (Converted from N700-3000 series)

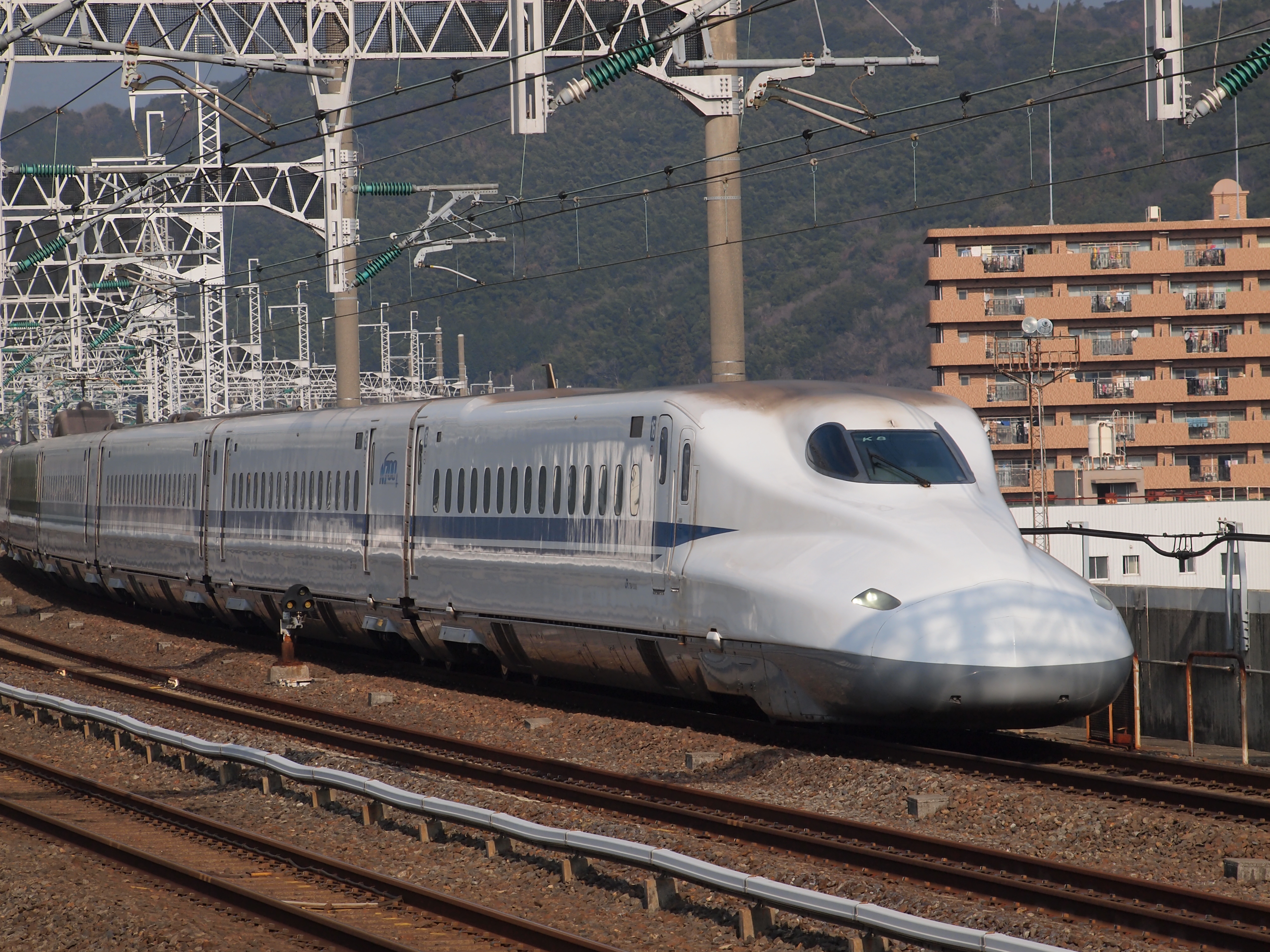
JR West N700-5000 series set K6, January 2016

These are JR West trainsets modified from October 2013 from former N700 series N sets to incorporate some of the design improvements featured in the later N700A series sets.

=== Former N sets ===
The 16-car N sets were operated by JR West on Tokaido and Sanyo Shinkansen services. The first set, N1, was delivered in June 2007, entering service on 1 July 2007. 16 sets were in service by April 2014.

The fleet of 16 "N" sets subsequently underwent modifications at Hakata Depot between fiscal 2013 and fiscal 2015 to add improved braking systems and other features incorporated in the later N700A series sets. Modified sets were re-designated "K" sets, with cars renumbered in the -5000 subseries.

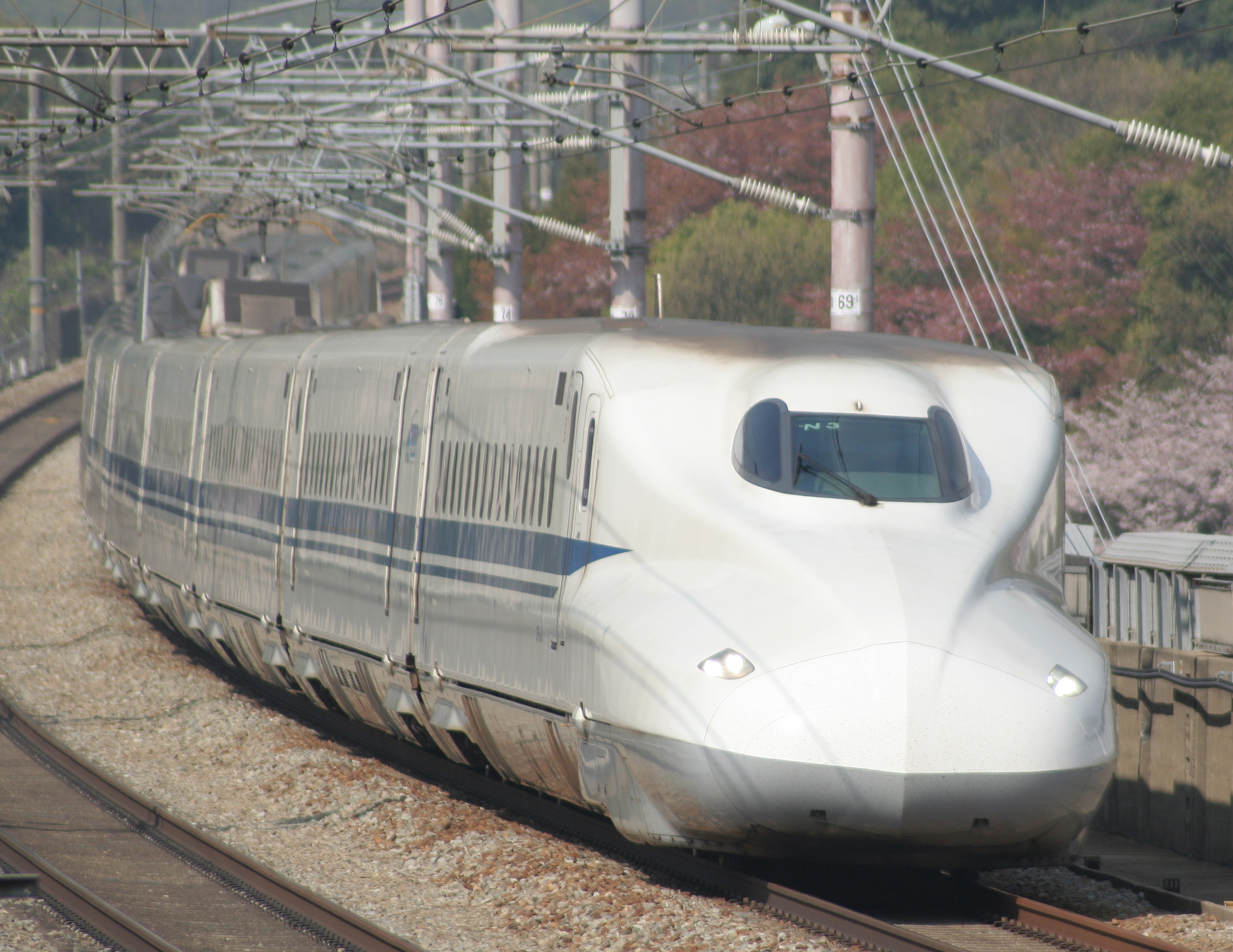
JR West N700 series set N3 (now K3) on the Sanyo Shinkansen, April 2009

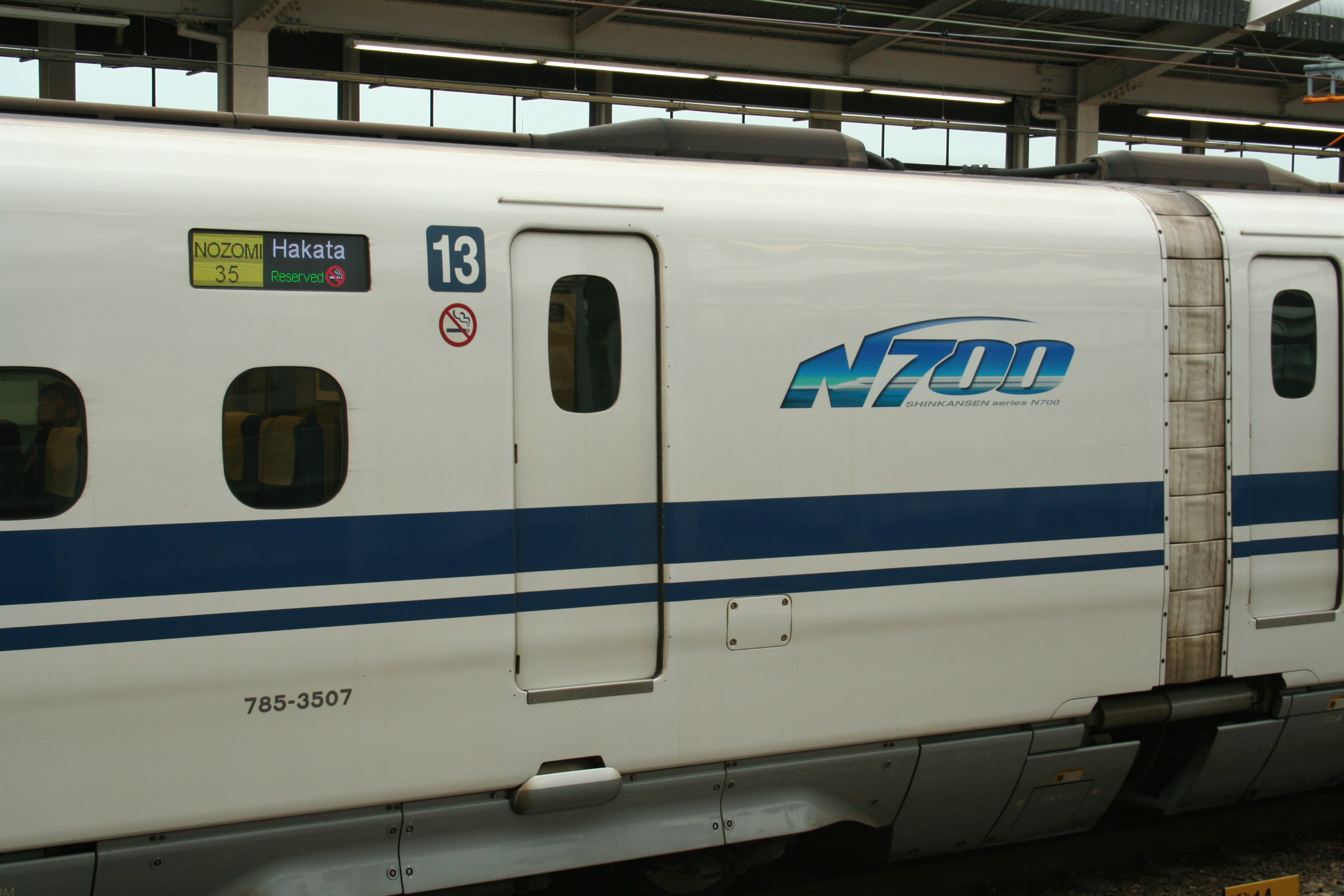
The logo on the side of car 13 of N700-3000 series set N7 (now K7), May 2009

=== Formation ===
The 16-car K sets are formed as follows.

Car No.	1	2	3	4	5	6	7	8	9	10	11	12	13	14	15	16
Designation	Tc	M2	M'w	M1	M1w	M'	M2k	M1s	M's	M2s	M'h	M1	M1w	M'	M2w	T'c
Numbering	783-5000	787-5000	786-5500	785-5000	785-5300	786-5000	787-5400	775-5000	776-5000	777-5000	786-5700	785-5600	785-5500	786-5200	787-5500	784-5000
Seating capacity	65	100	85	100	90	100	75	68	64	68	63	100	90	100	80	75
Facilities	Toilets		Toilets, smoking room	Telephone	Toilets		Toilets, smoking room	Conductor's office	Toilets, telephone	Smoking room	Toilets, wheelchair space, multi-purpose room	Telephone	Toilets		Toilets, smoking room, telephone	

==== Former N set formation ====
The 16-car N sets were formed as follows.

Car No.	1	2	3	4	5	6	7	8	9	10	11	12	13	14	15	16
Designation	Tc	M2	M'w	M1	M1w	M'	M2k	M1s	M's	M2s	M'h	M1	M1w	M'	M2w	T'c
Numbering	783-3000	787-3000	786-3500	785-3000	785-3300	786-3000	787-3400	775-3000	776-3000	777-3000	786-3700	785-3600	785-3500	786-3200	787-3500	784-3000
Seating capacity	65	100	85	100	90	100	75	68	64	68	63	100	90	100	80	75
Facilities	Toilets		Toilets, smoking room	Telephone	Toilets		Toilets, smoking room	Conductor's office	Toilets, telephone	Smoking room	Toilets, wheelchair space, multi-purpose room	Telephone	Toilets		Toilets, smoking room, telephone	

Cars 5 and 12 each have one single-arm pantograph.

=== Fleet list ===
As of 1 April 2016, the JR West N700A series fleet is as follows.

Set No.	Manufacturer	Date delivered	Date converted to N700A
K1	Kawasaki Heavy Industries	1 June 2007	19 December 2014
K2	Kawasaki Heavy Industries	10 July 2007	18 February 2015
K3	Nippon Sharyo	6 August 2007	13 March 2015
K4	Nippon Sharyo	9 October 2007	25 October 2013
K5	Kawasaki Heavy Industries	10 November 2007	18 December 2013
K6	Kawasaki Heavy Industries	13 September 2007	22 June 2015
K7	Kawasaki Heavy Industries	12 September 2007	4 September 2015
K8	Kinki Sharyo	31 January 2008	7 August 2014
K9	Kawasaki Heavy Industries	20 May 2008	7 March 2016
K10	Kawasaki Heavy Industries	17 November 2009	24 April 2014
K11	Kawasaki Heavy Industries	18 December 2009	11 December 2015
K12	Kinki Sharyo	28 January 2010	6 October 2014
K13	Kawasaki Heavy Industries	15 October 2009	12 March 2014
K14	Kawasaki Heavy Industries	28 February 2010	21 October 2014
K15	Hitachi	23 May 2010	19 November 2014
K16	Hitachi	14 December 2010	9 April 2015

== 8-car P sets (N700-6000 series "N700A") ==
- 14 x 8 car sets (planned)

These are 8-car sets owned by JR West and converted from the original 16-car N700-5000 series K sets from fiscal 2025.

In an announcement made on 14 February 2024, JR West revealed plans to convert four existing 16-car N700 series sets into 8-car sets. This move is to be made in a bid to retire four of the remaining 500 series sets on the San'yo Shinkansen. The conversions of the first four sets are set to take place between 2024 and the end of 2026. JR West later announced on 24 July 2024 that ten more 16-car N700 series sets are also scheduled to be converted to 8-car sets from 2026 to 2029.

Cars 1 to 3, 8 to 11 and 16 of the original 16-car sets will be retained and renumbered in the -6000 sub-series. The first set, K4, was converted from December 2024 to March 2025 and re-designated as P4. The first of these sets was originally to begin service on 1 October 2025. However, set P4 began service on 12 September, more than two weeks before the planned start of service.

=== Formation ===
The 8-car P sets are formed as follows.

Car No.	1	2	3	4	5	6	7	8
Designation	Tc	M2	M'w	M1s	M's	M2s	M'h	T'c
Numbering	783-6000	787-6000	786-6000	785-6000	785-6500	787-6500	786-6700	784-6000
Formerly	783-5000 (car 1)	787-5000 (car 2)	786-5500 (car 3)	775-5000 (car 8)	776-5000 (car 9)	777-5000 (car 10)	786-5700 (car 11)	784-5000 (car 16)
Seating Capacity	65	100	85	68	64	68	63	75
Facilities	Toilets		Toilets	Conductor's Office	Toilets, Telephone		Toilets, wheelchair space, multi- purpose room	

Cars 2 and 7 each have one single-arm pantograph.

Cars 4, 5 and 6 are former Green Cars.

=== Fleet list ===
Set No.	Manufacturer	Date delivered	Date converted to N700A	Date converted to 8 cars
P1	Kawasaki Heavy Industries	1 June 2007	19 December 2014	27 August 2026
P4	Nippon Sharyo	9 October 2007	25 October 2013	25 March 2025
P8	Kinki Sharyo	31 January 2008	7 August 2014	7 April 2026

== 8-car S sets (N700-7000 series) ==
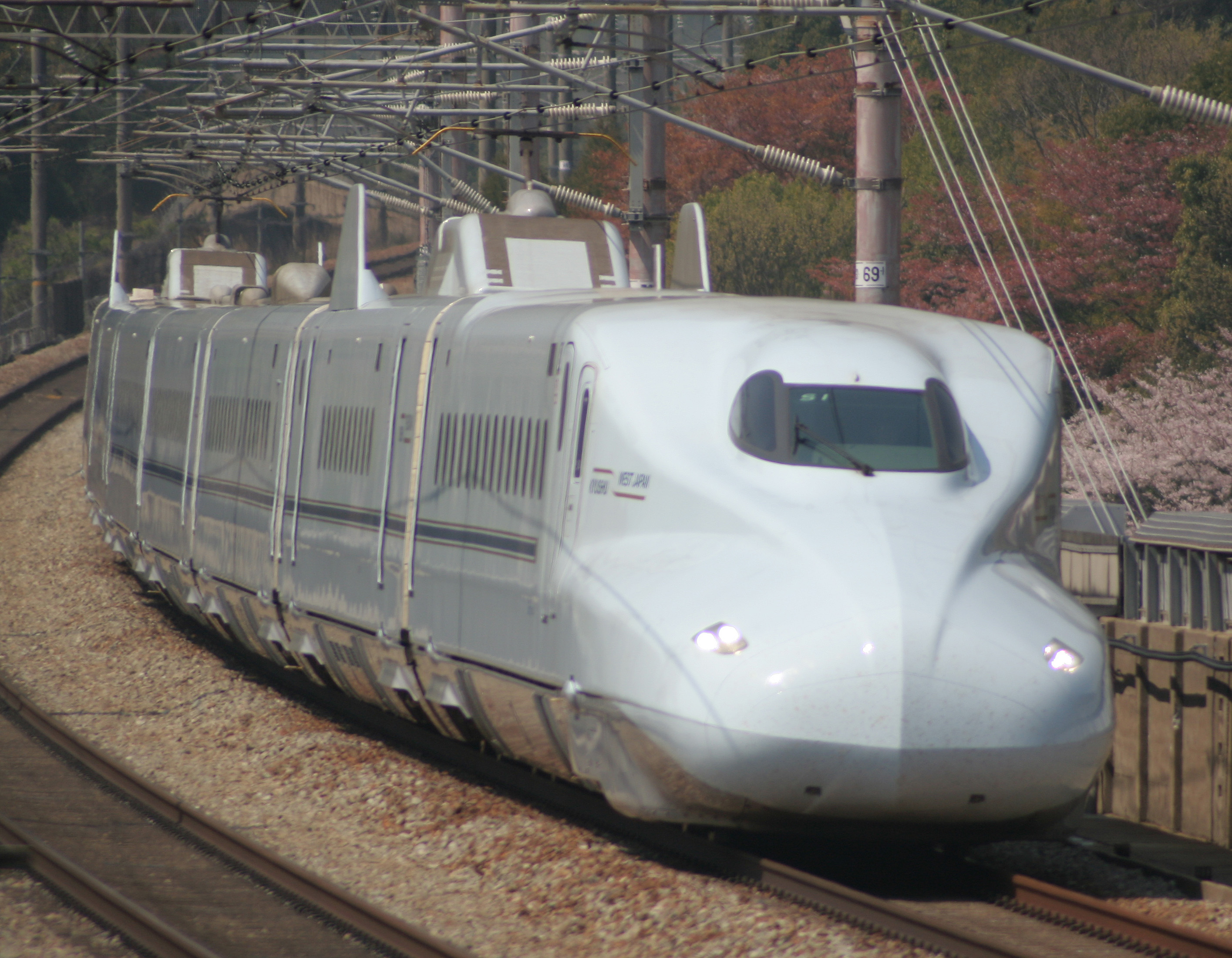
First N700-7000 series set, S1, on a test run on the Sanyo Shinkansen, April 2009

- 19 x 8-car sets, S1–S19

The N700-7000 series variant are 8-car sets operated by JR West on through-running Sakura and Mizuho services between Shin-Ōsaka and Kagoshima-Chūō on the Kyushu Shinkansen since 12 March 2011. The pre-series set (S1) was delivered to Hakata Depot in October 2008. These trains do not feature the tilting mechanism of the earlier N700 trains, as they do not run on the Tokaido Shinkansen.

External livery is shiraai (白藍) pale blue intended to evoke the color of traditional porcelain with indigo and gold body side lining.

Full-production JR West sets were delivered to Hakata Depot from early April 2010. The final S set, S19, was delivered to Hakata Depot in February 2012.

=== Formation ===
The 8-car S sets, S1–S19, are formed as follows.

Car No.	1	2	3	4	5	6	7	8
Designation	Mc	M1	M'	M2	M2w	M's	M1h	M'c
Numbering	781-7000	788-7000	786-7000	787-7000	787-7500	766-7000	788-7700	782-7000
Seating capacity	60	100	80		72	36+24	38	56

Cars 2 and 7 each have one single-arm pantograph.

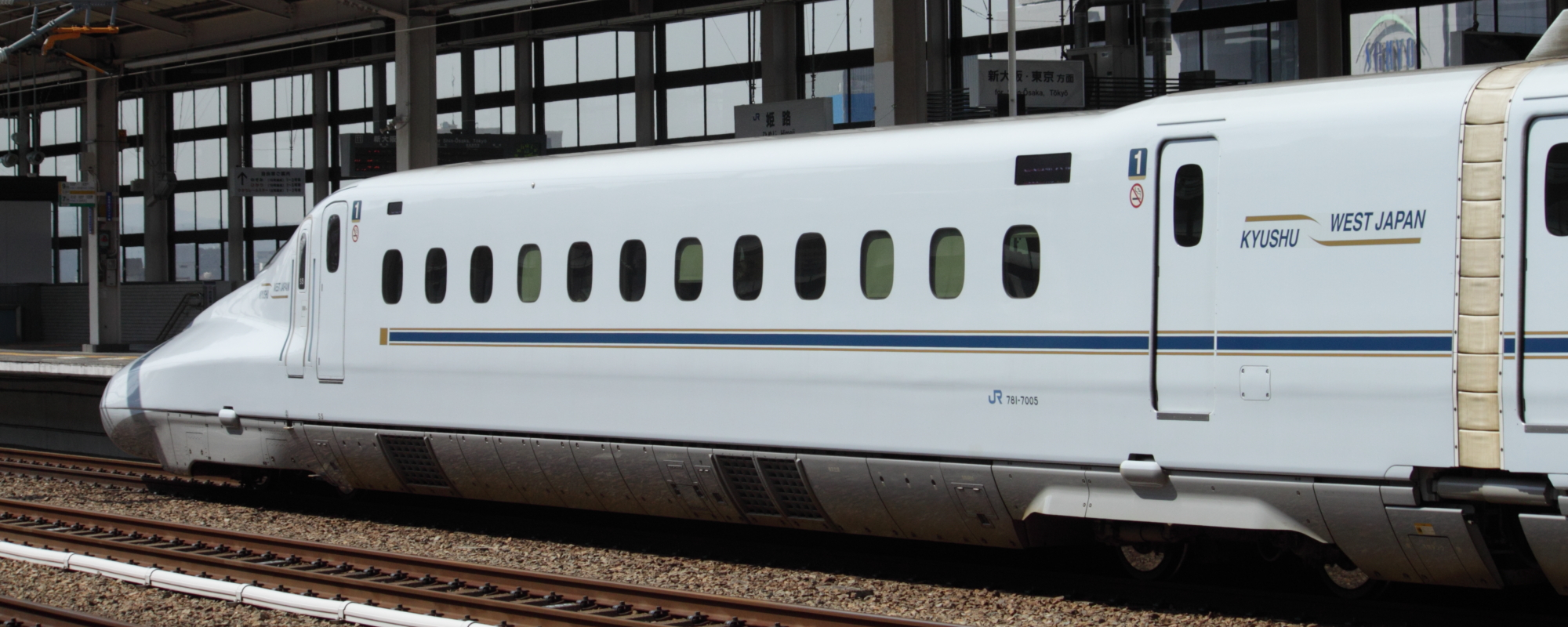
781-7000 (Car 1)

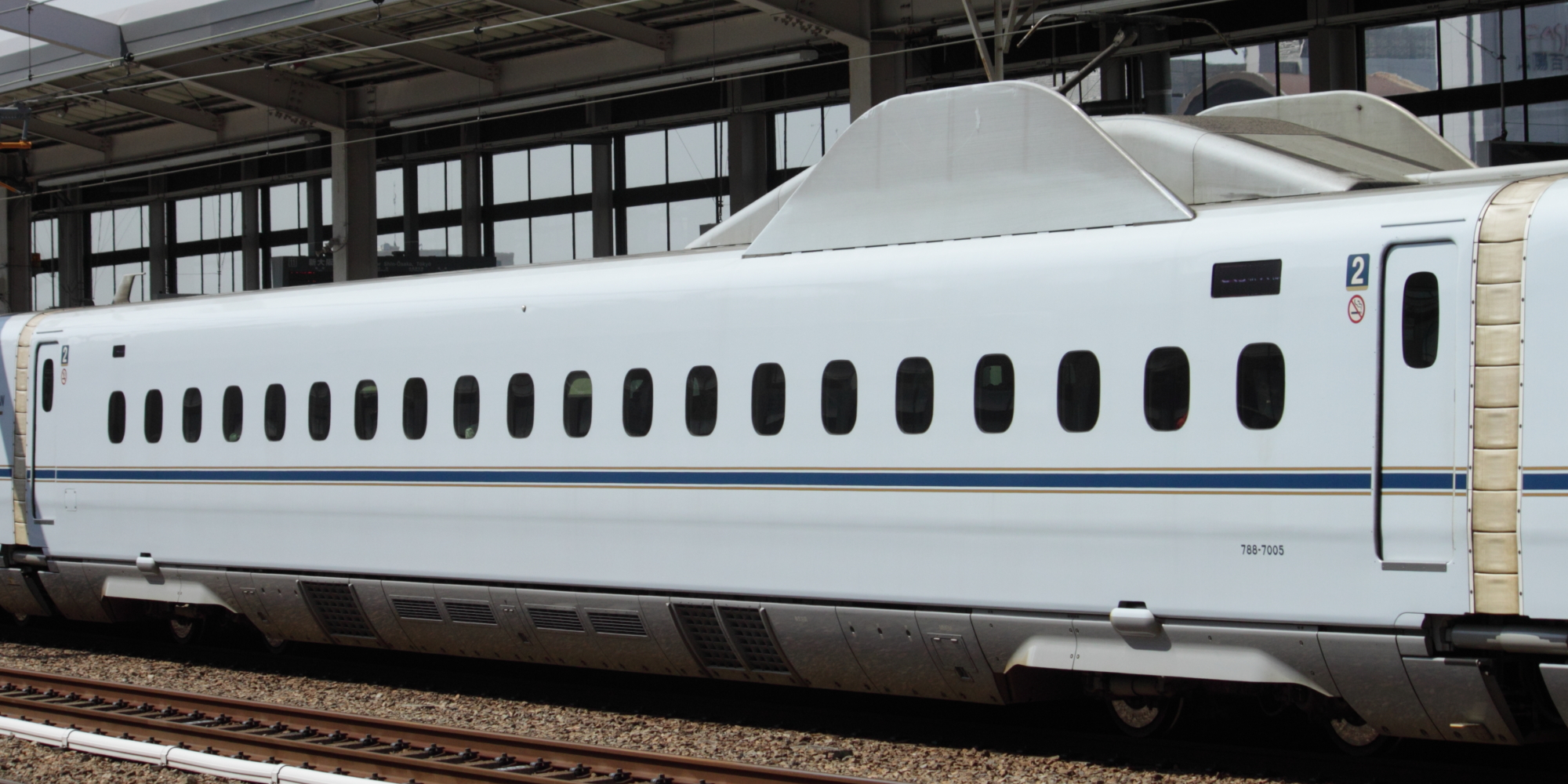
788-7000 (Car 2)

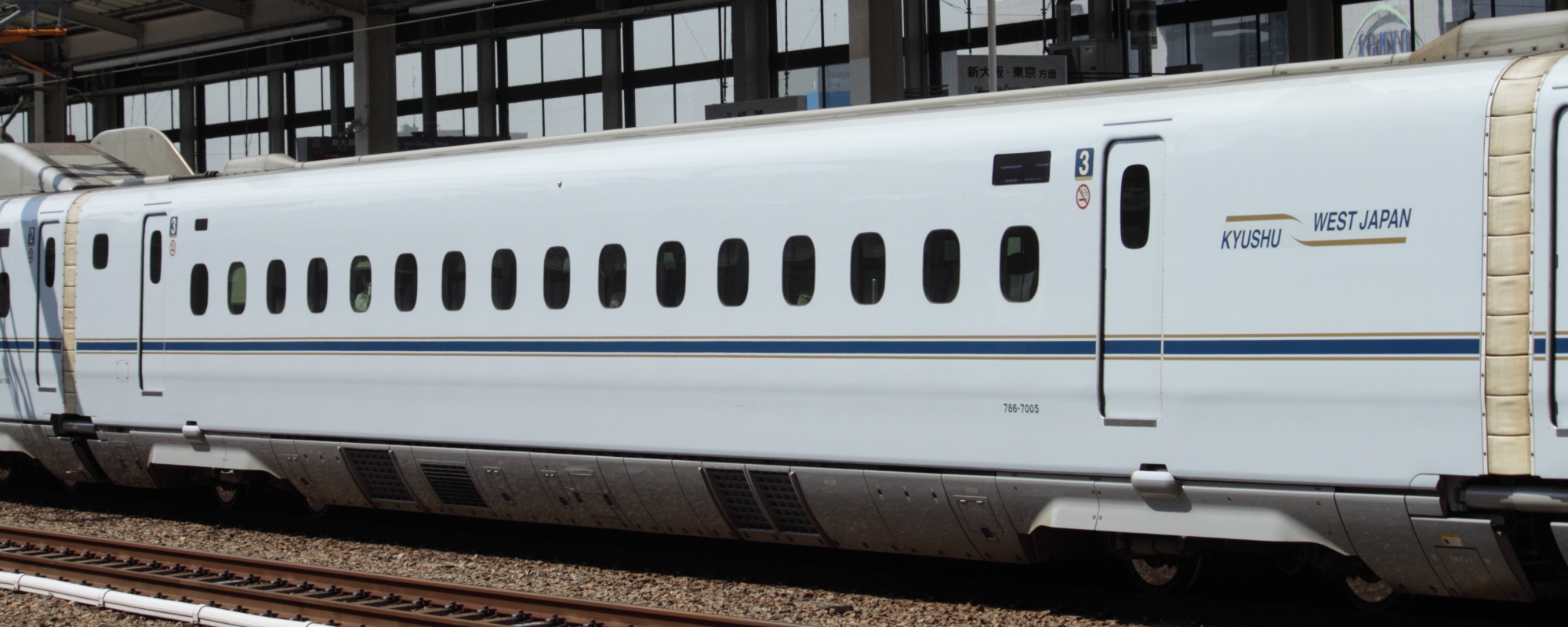
786-7000 (Car 3)

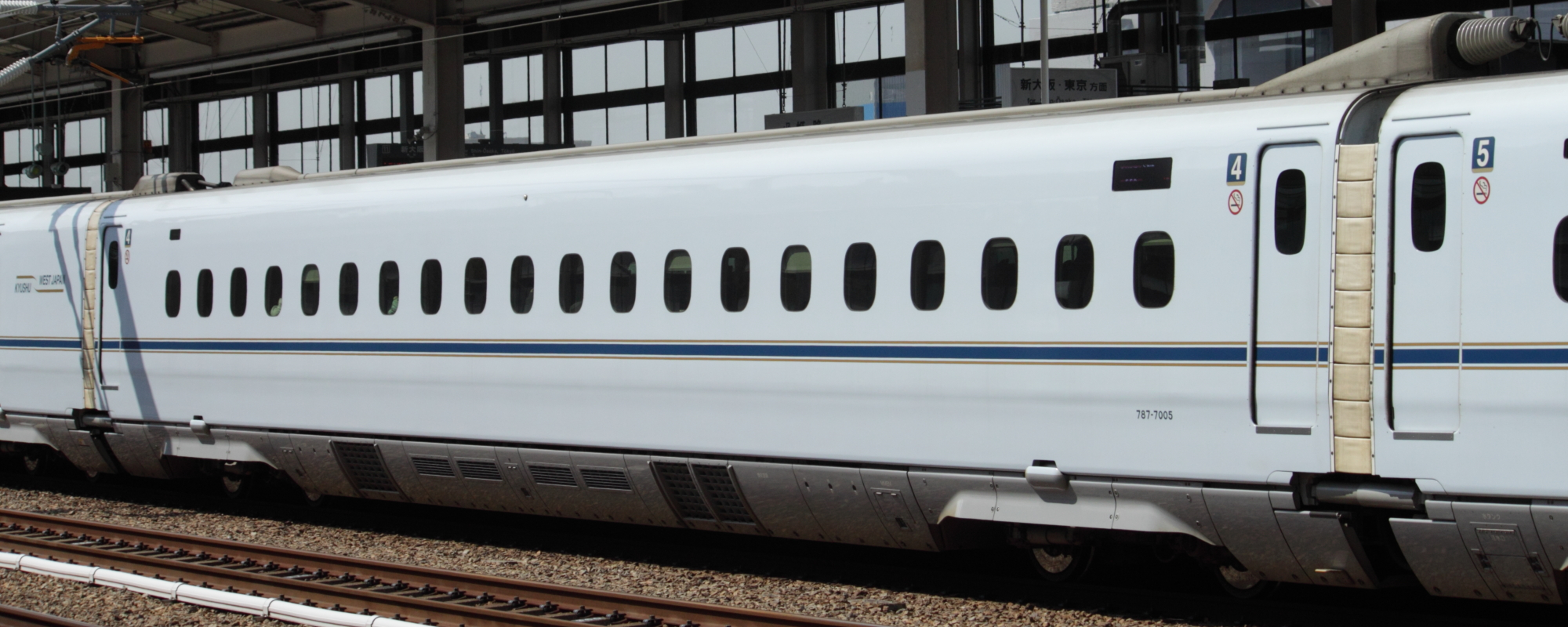
787-7000 (Car 4)

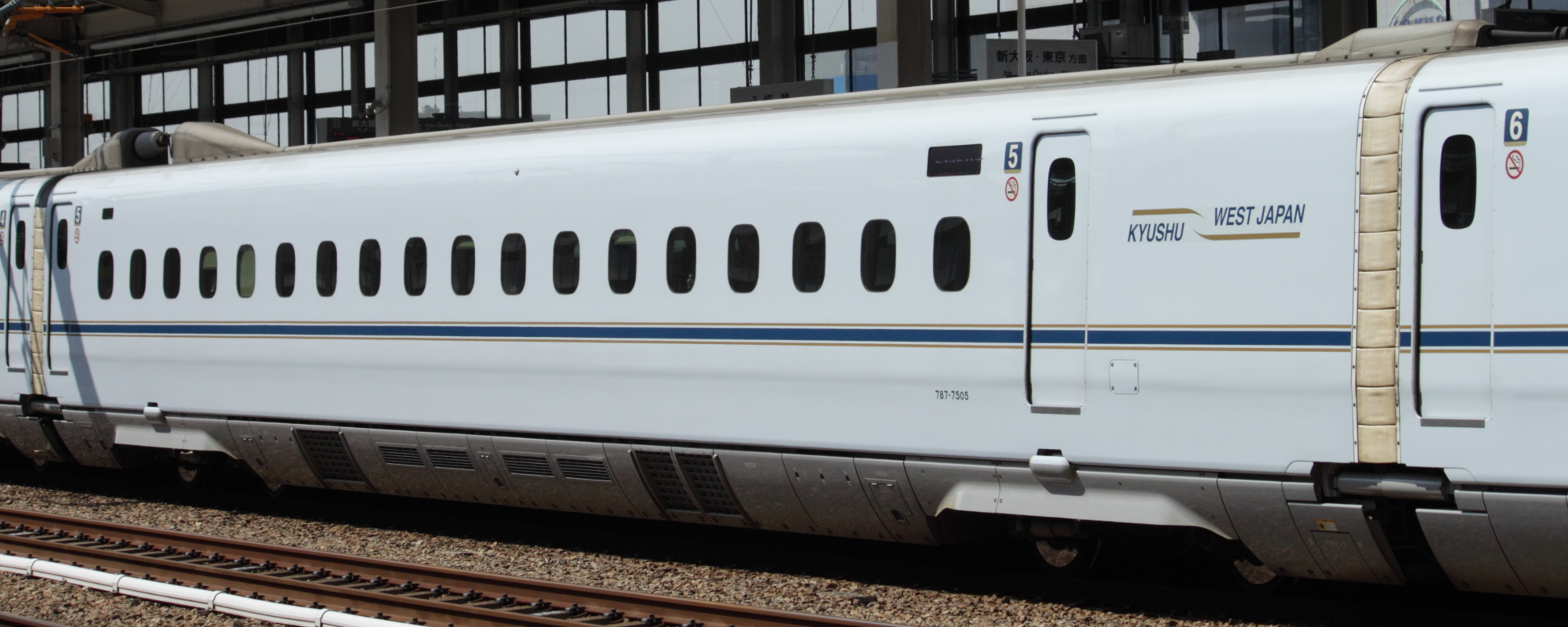
787-7500 (Car 5)

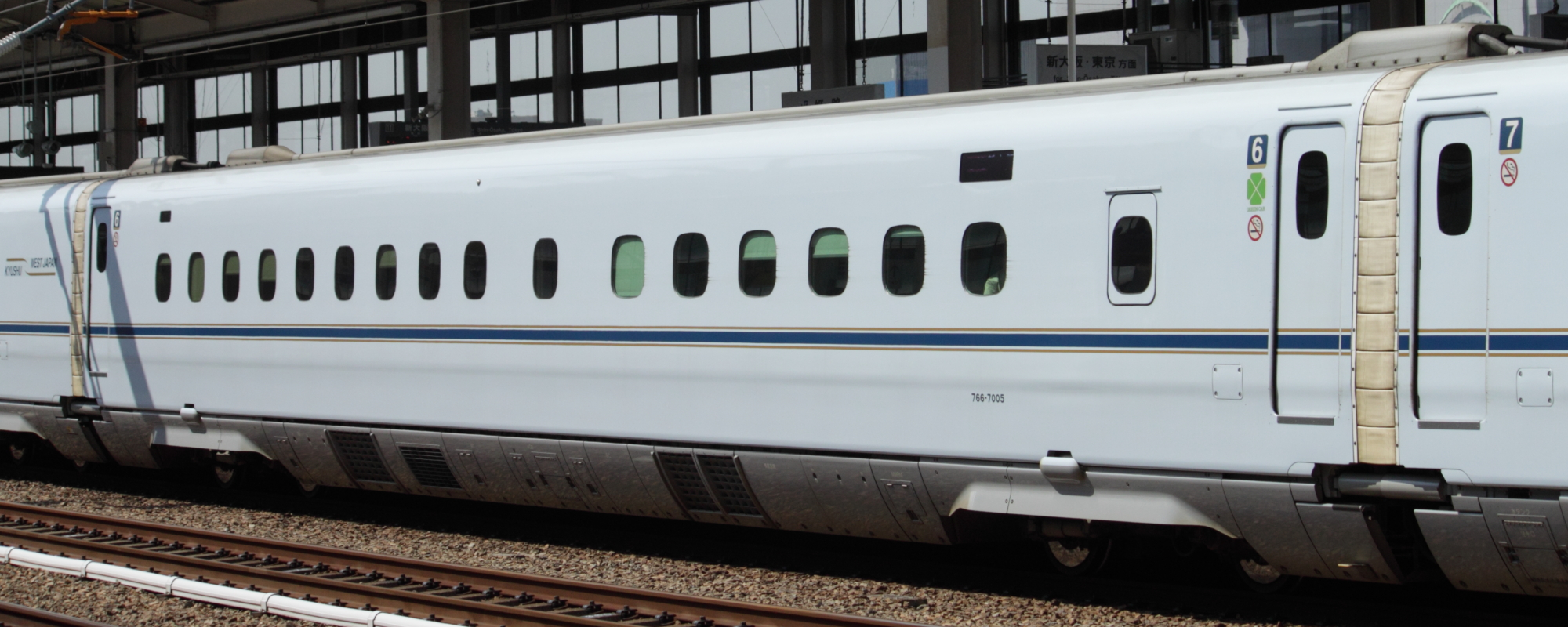
766-7000 (Car 6)

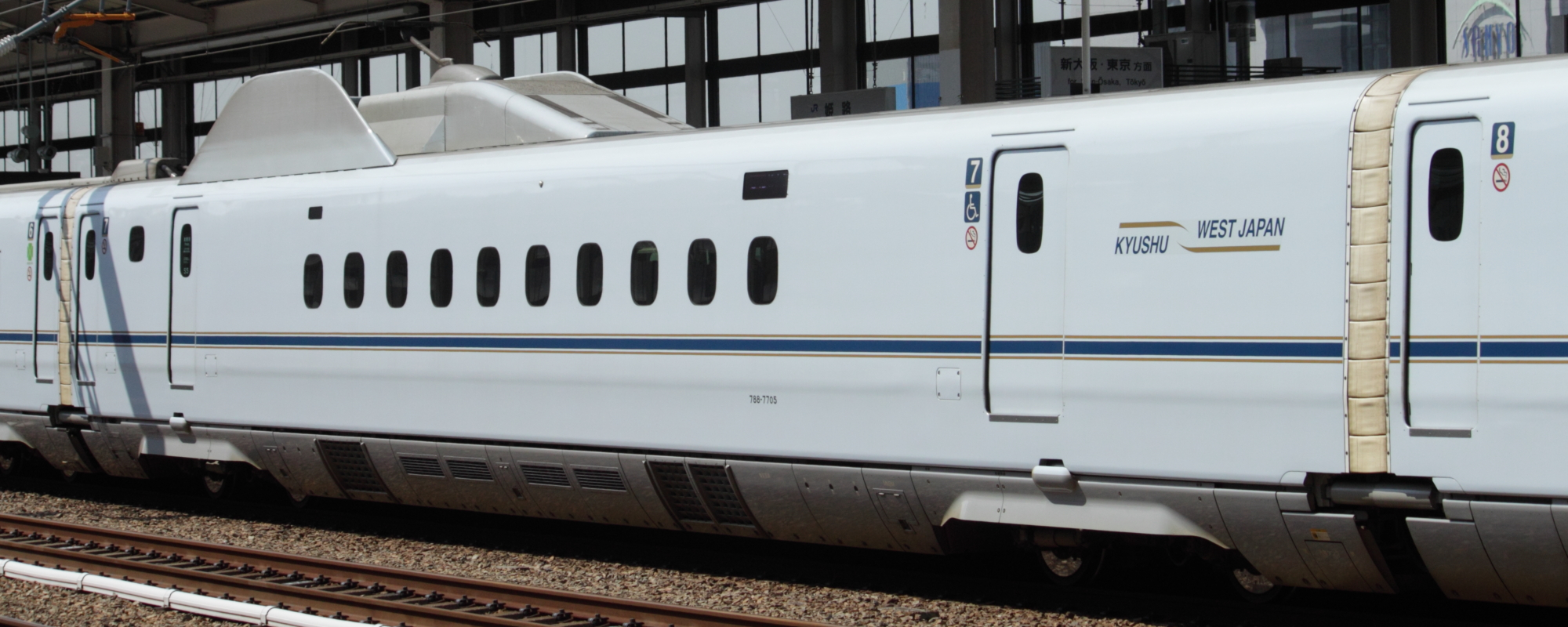
788-7700 (Car 7)

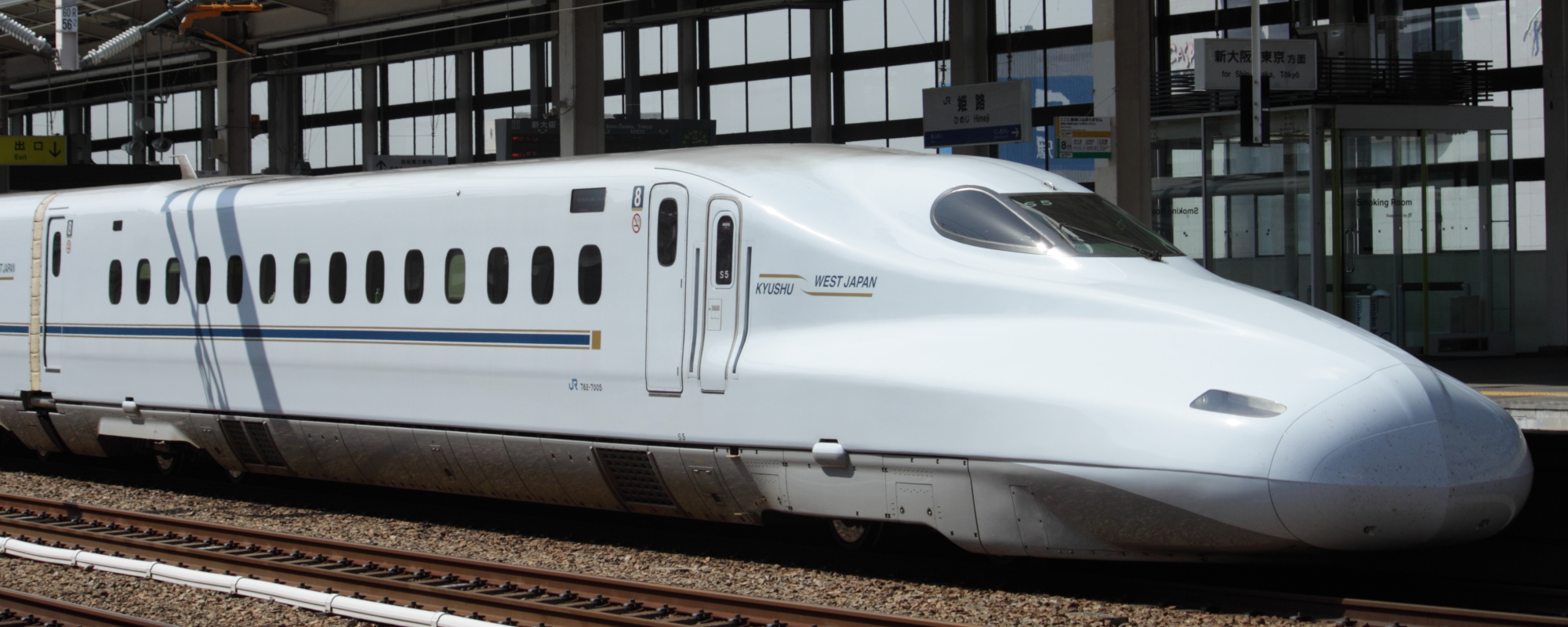
782-7000 (Car 8)

=== Interior ===
These sets feature a Green car saloon in half of one car (car 6) consisting of 24 seats (6 rows) arranged in 2+2 abreast configuration with 480 mm (19 in) wide seats and a seat pitch of 1,160 mm (46 in). Cars 4 to 8 (including half of car 6) are designated as "reserved seating" cars with 2+2 abreast configuration, 465 mm wide seats and a seat pitch of 1,040 mm. Cars 1 to 3 are "non-reserved seating" cars with 2+3 abreast configuration, 440 mm wide seats (460 mm in middle of 3-seat row) and a seat pitch of 1,040 mm.

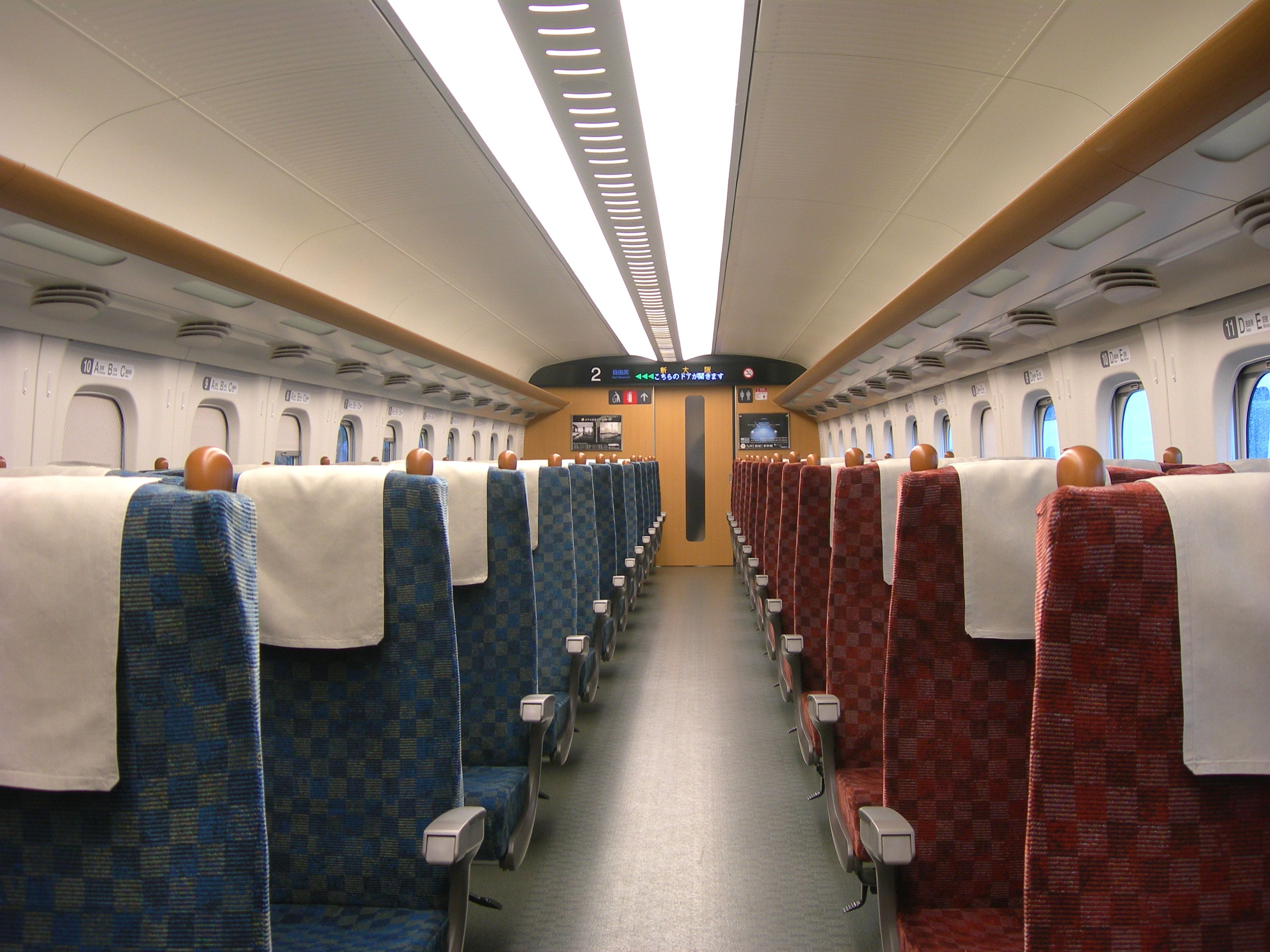
N700-7000 series standard-class non-reserved car seating, April 2011

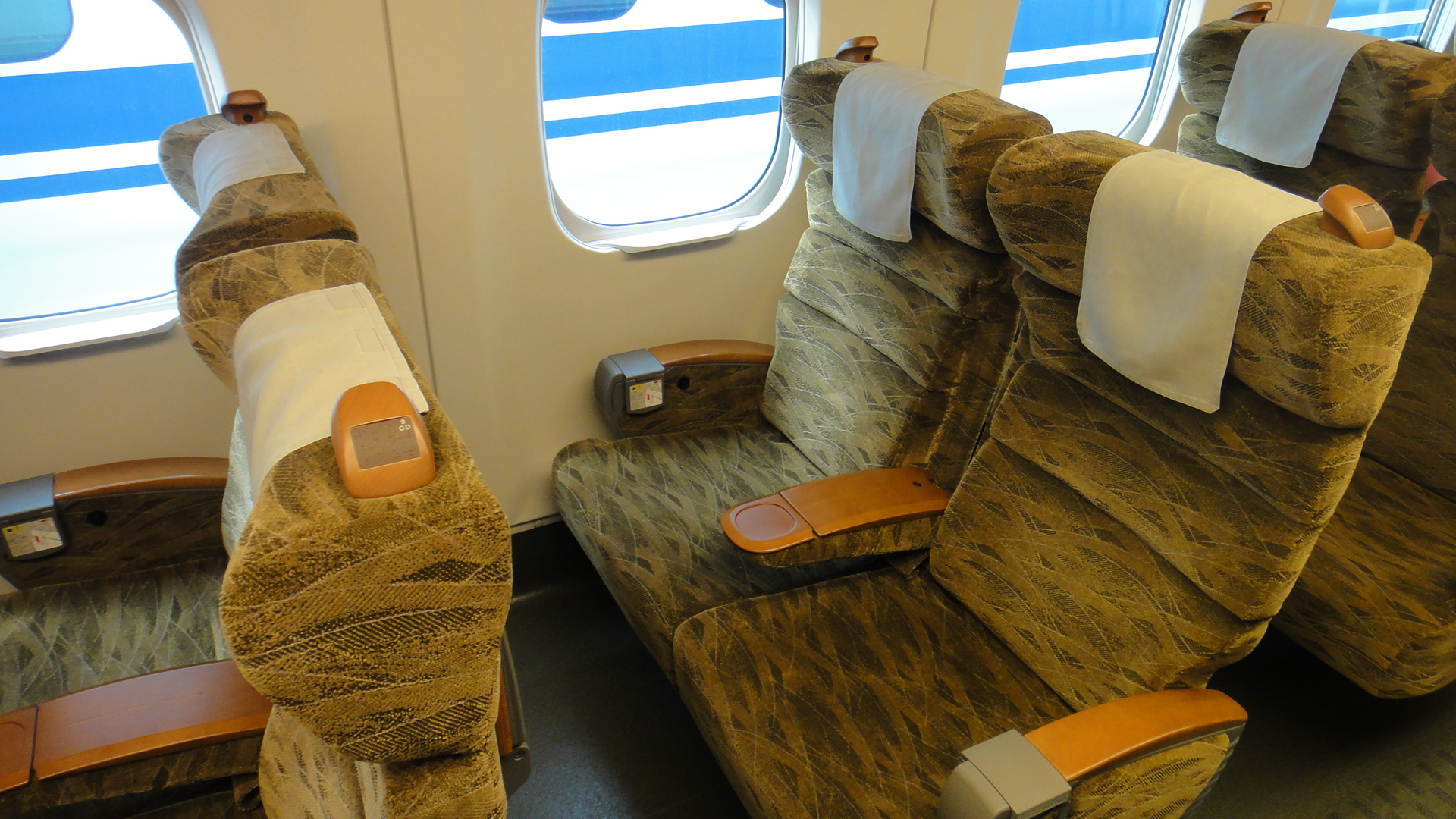
N700-7000 series standard-class reserved car seating, August 2011

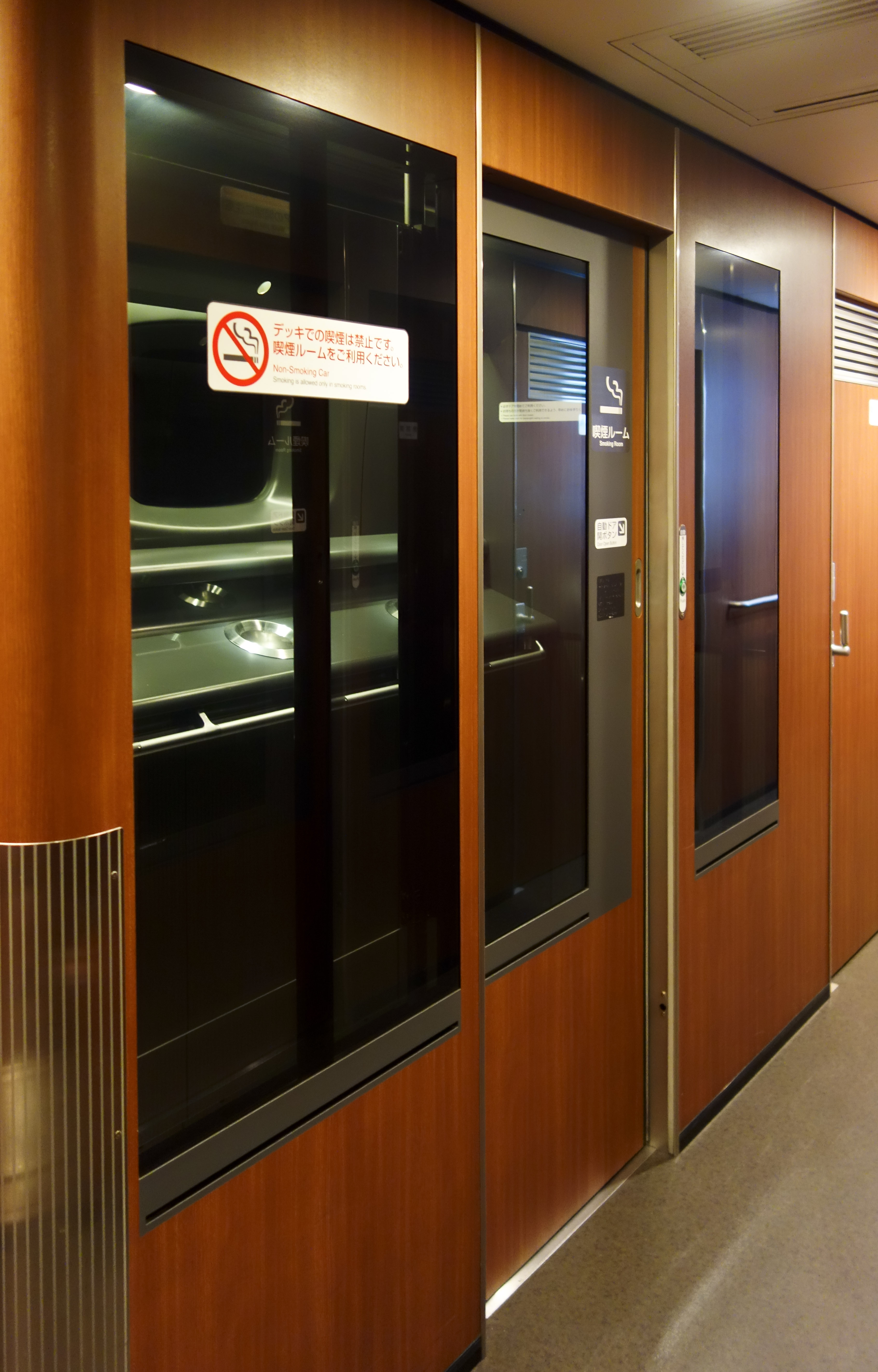
A smoking room

=== Fleet list ===
As of 1 April 2016, the fleet consists of 19 sets, all based at Hakata Shinkansen Depot.

Set No.	Manufacturer	Date delivered
S1	Kawasaki/Kinki Sharyo/Nippon Sharyo	24 October 2008
S2	Kawasaki Heavy Industries	20 April 2010
S3	Nippon Sharyo	12 July 2010
S4	Kawasaki Heavy Industries	22 June 2010
S5	Kawasaki Heavy Industries	4 August 2010
S6	Kawasaki Heavy Industries	14 September 2010
S7	Kinki Sharyo	17 November 2010
S8	Kinki Sharyo	14 January 2011
S9	Nippon Sharyo	16 February 2011
S10	Nippon Sharyo	12 April 2011
S11	Kawasaki Heavy Industries	30 May 2011
S12	Kawasaki Heavy Industries	24 June 2011
S13	Kawasaki Heavy Industries	11 July 2011
S14	Kawasaki Heavy Industries	1 August 2011
S15	Kawasaki Heavy Industries	3 October 2011
S16	Kawasaki Heavy Industries	23 October 2011
S17	Nippon Sharyo	15 November 2011
S18	Kawasaki Heavy Industries	23 January 2012
S19	Hitachi	27 February 2012

== 8-car R sets (N700-8000 series) ==
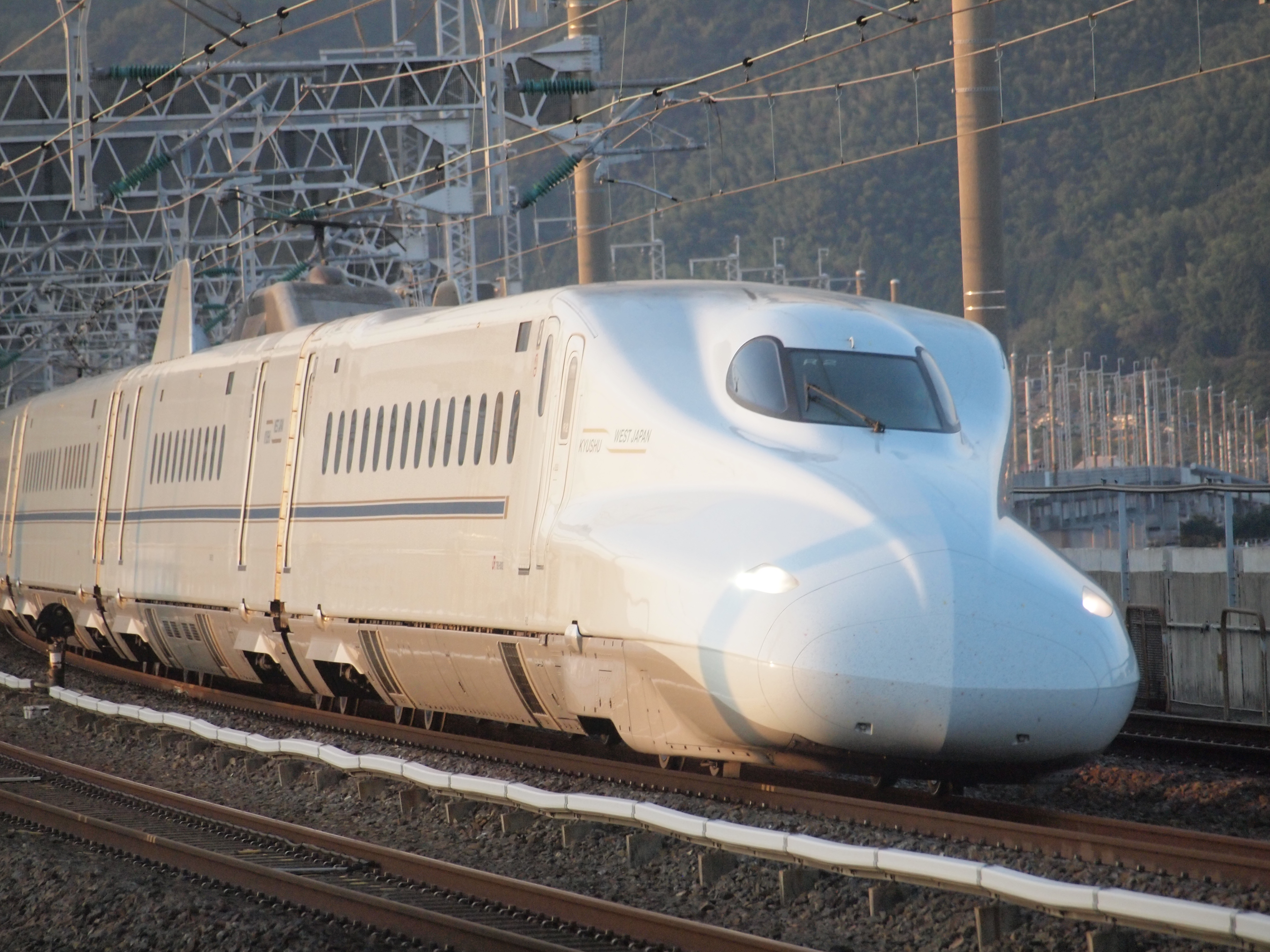
JR Kyushu N700-8000 series set R2, October 2015

- 11 x 8-car sets, R1–R11

These are eleven 8-car N700 series sets operated by JR Kyushu alongside JR West N700-7000 series "S" sets on through-running Sakura and Mizuho services between Shin-Osaka and Kagoshima-Chūō on the Kyushu Shinkansen since 12 March 2011. External livery is identical to the N700-7000 series "S" sets.

The first set, R1, was delivered to Kumamoto Depot in July 2010. Test running on the unopened section of the Kyushu Shinkansen began on 31 August 2010.

=== Formation ===
The 8-car R sets are formed as follows.

Car No.	1	2	3	4	5	6	7	8
Designation	Mc	M1	M'	M2	M2w	M's	M1h	M'c
Numbering	781-8000	788-8000	786-8000	787-8000	787-8500	766-8000	788-8700	782-8000
Seating capacity	60	100	80		72	36+24	38	56

Cars 2 and 7 each have one single-arm pantograph.

=== Interior ===
As with the JR West N700-7000 series sets, the R sets feature a Green car saloon in half of one car (car 6) consisting of 24 seats (6 rows) arranged in 2+2 abreast configuration. Cars 4 to 8 (including half of car 6) are designated as "reserved seating" cars with 2+2 abreast configuration. Cars 1 to 3 are "non-reserved seating" cars with 2+3 abreast configuration.

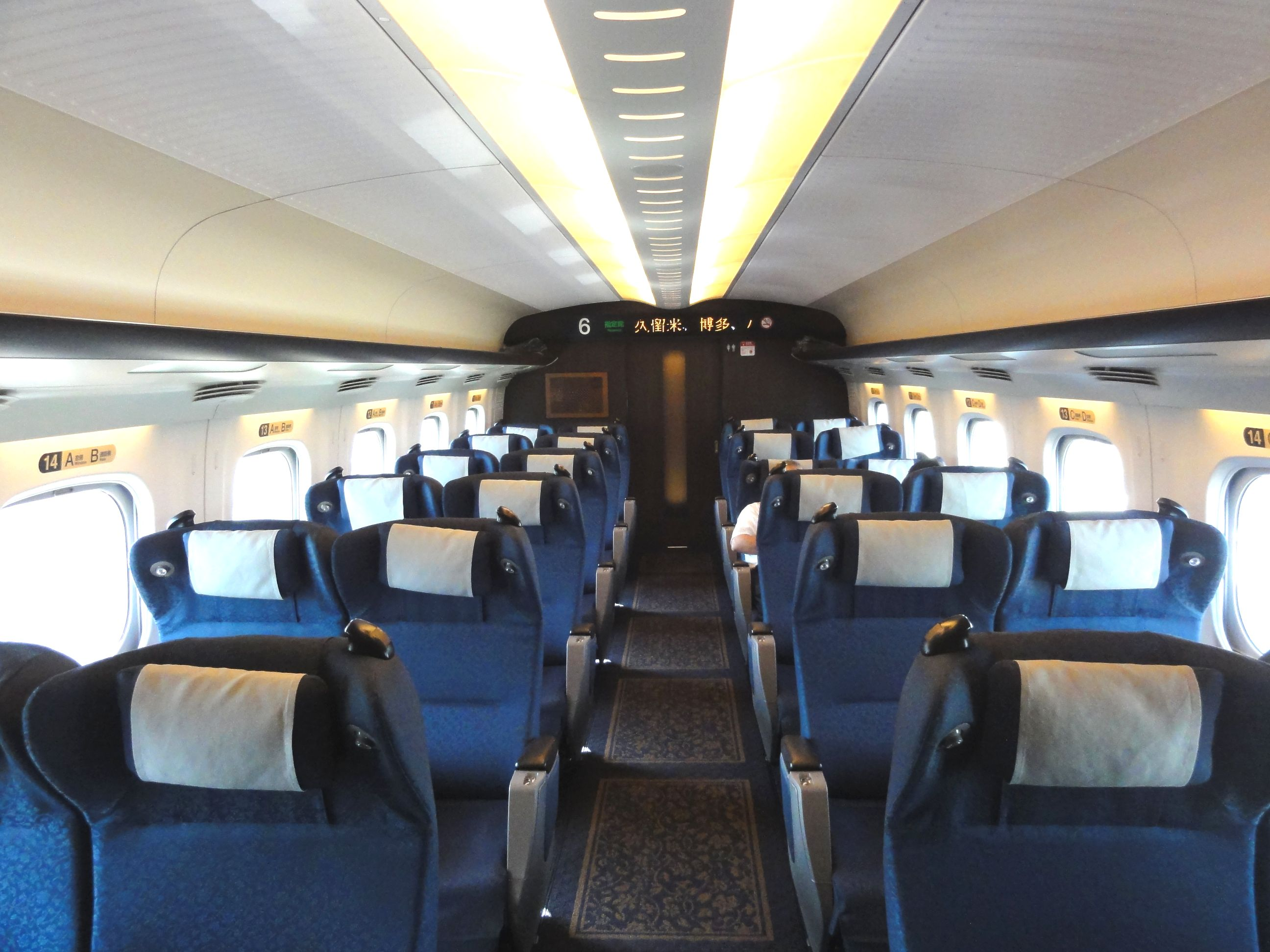
Green class seating saloon, September 2011

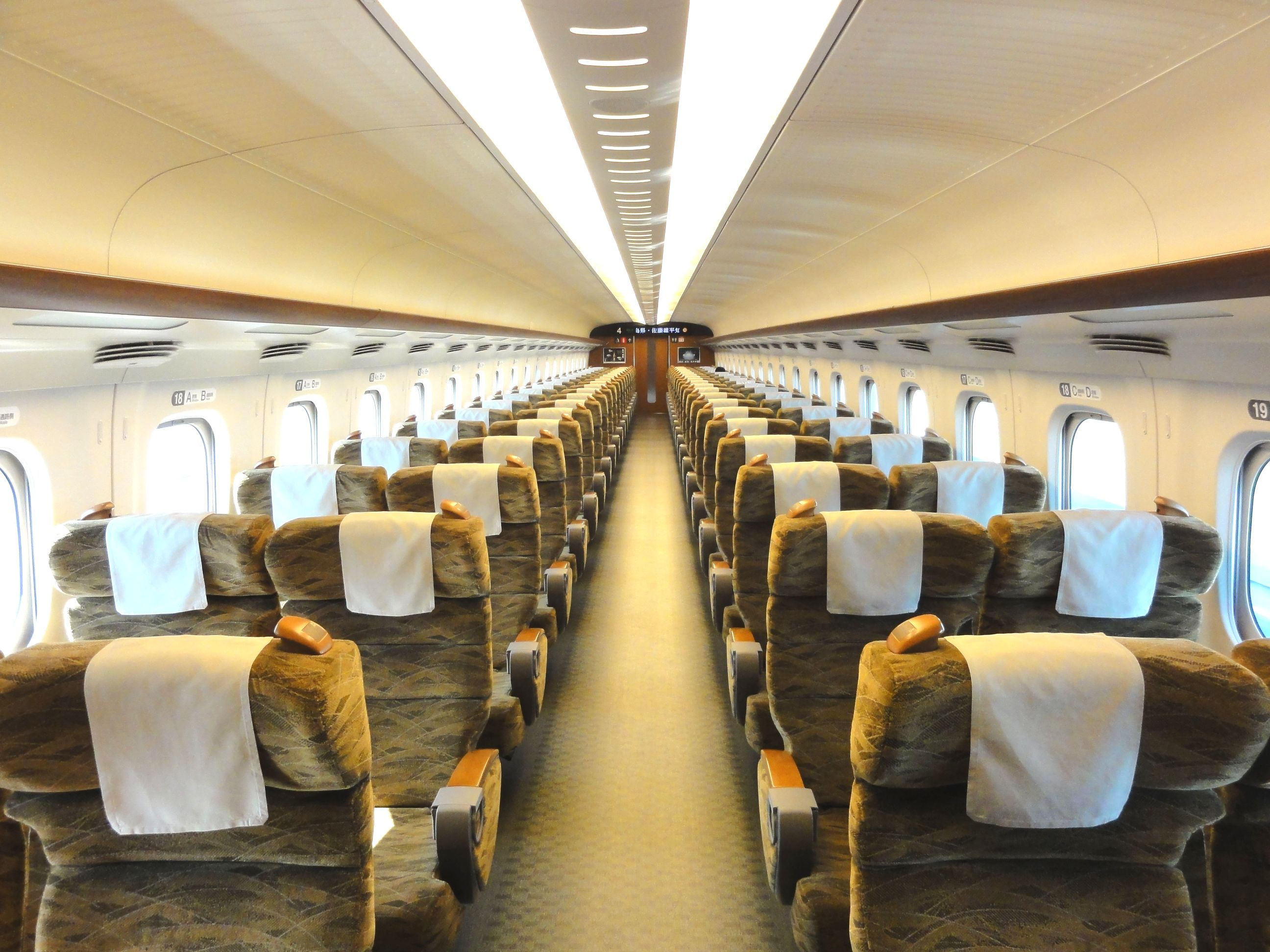
Reserved car with 2+2 abreast seating, September 2011

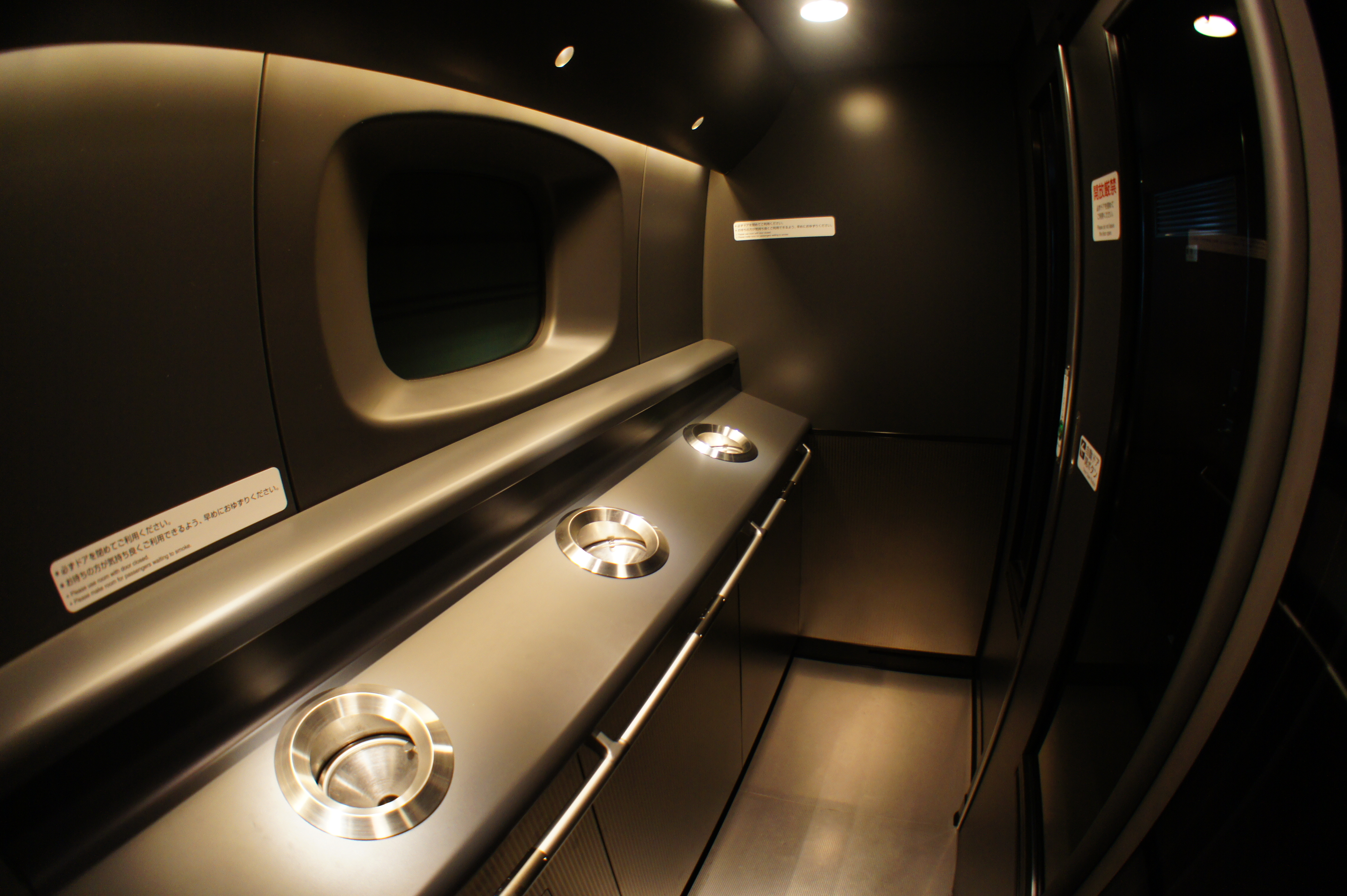
Interior of a smoking room

=== Fleet list ===
As of 1 April 2016, the fleet consists of 11 sets, all based at Kumamoto Shinkansen Depot.

Set No.	Manufacturer	Date delivered
R1	Hitachi	11 December 2010
R2	Hitachi	23 November 2010
R3	Hitachi	6 December 2010
R4	Kawasaki Heavy Industries	27 November 2010
R5	Kawasaki Heavy Industries	18 December 2010
R6	Hitachi	31 January 2011
R7	Kawasaki Heavy Industries	12 January 2011
R8	Kawasaki Heavy Industries	4 February 2011
R9	Kawasaki Heavy Industries	18 February 2011
R10	Kinki Sharyo	11 February 2011
R11	Kinki Sharyo	6 July 2012

== N700-I Bullet ==
This was a proposed export version of the N700 series design announced by JR Central Chairman Yoshiyuki Kasai at an international high-speed railway symposium held in Nagoya on 16 November 2009. Nominally specified as an 8-car set with a maximum operating speed of 330 km/h (205 mph), the train can be configured in lengths from 6 to 16 cars to suit customer requirements.

The same model was being considered in the developing Houston–Dallas Texas Central Railway, before focus shifted to the N700S due to its inherently modular construction, and higher top speed.

== High-speed trials ==
On 16 November 2009, JR Central conducted a late-night high-speed demonstration run using N700 series trainset Z0, recording a maximum speed of 332 km/h (206 mph) on the Tokaido Shinkansen between Maibara and Kyōto. The high-speed run was conducted as a demonstration for approximately 160 international guests attending a high-speed railway symposium in Nagoya.

== Incidents ==
=== Fire damage and replacement ===
Car 783-2059 (car 1) of JR Central set X59 was scrapped due to fire damage sustained in an arson attack occurring on 30 June 2015. A replacement car with the same running number was built by Nippon Sharyo in 2016.

=== Discovery of cracked bogie ===
On 11 December 2017, Car 785-5505 (car 13) of JR West set K5 (a 16-car N700A built by Kawasaki Heavy Industries) was taken out of service at Nagoya Station after engineers confirmed an unusual burning smell. The smell was detected at Kokura Station, but was ordered by the operational centre to continue service until Nagoya which JR West later admitted was a "big danger". An on-site inspection revealed that the outer frame of the carriage had cracked and its underfloor carriage was leaking oil. It was the first "serious incident" involving any Shinkansen, and Ministry of Land, Infrastructure, Transport and Tourism reported that the train could have derailed had it continued on service and the carriage frame broke. An investigation by JR West implicated companies involved in the construction of the trainset, which included Kawasaki Heavy Industries, Nippon Steel and Mitsubishi Electric. The investigation revealed that at least 100 out of the 303 Kawasaki-made bogies were substandard due to improper welding preparations, which caused the base material of the bogies to become 4.7 mm (0.19 in) in thickness, instead of the required 7 mm (0.28 in) or more. Following the events JR West is planning to gradually replace all the bogies that were provided by Kawasaki.

== Overall fleet history ==
The annual totals for the fleet sizes (number of vehicles as of 1 April each year) owned by JR Central, JR West, and JR Kyushu are as follows.

Year	■ JR Central	■ JR West	■ JR Kyushu	Total
2005	16	0	0	16
2006	16	0	0	16
2007	16	0	0	16
2008	272	128	0	400
2009	528	152	0	680
2010	1,040	232	0	1,272
2011	1,040	328	80	1,448
2012	1,296	368	80	1,744
2013	1,392	408	88	1,888
2014	1,504	424	88	2,016
2015	1,600	424	88	2,112
2016	1,696	488	88	2,272
2017	1,808	552	88	2,448
2018	1,920	616	88	2,624
2019	2,016	680	88	2,784
2020	2,096	792	88	2,976
2021	1,952	792	88	2,832
2022	1,744	792	88	2,624

View chart definition.

== Preserved examples ==
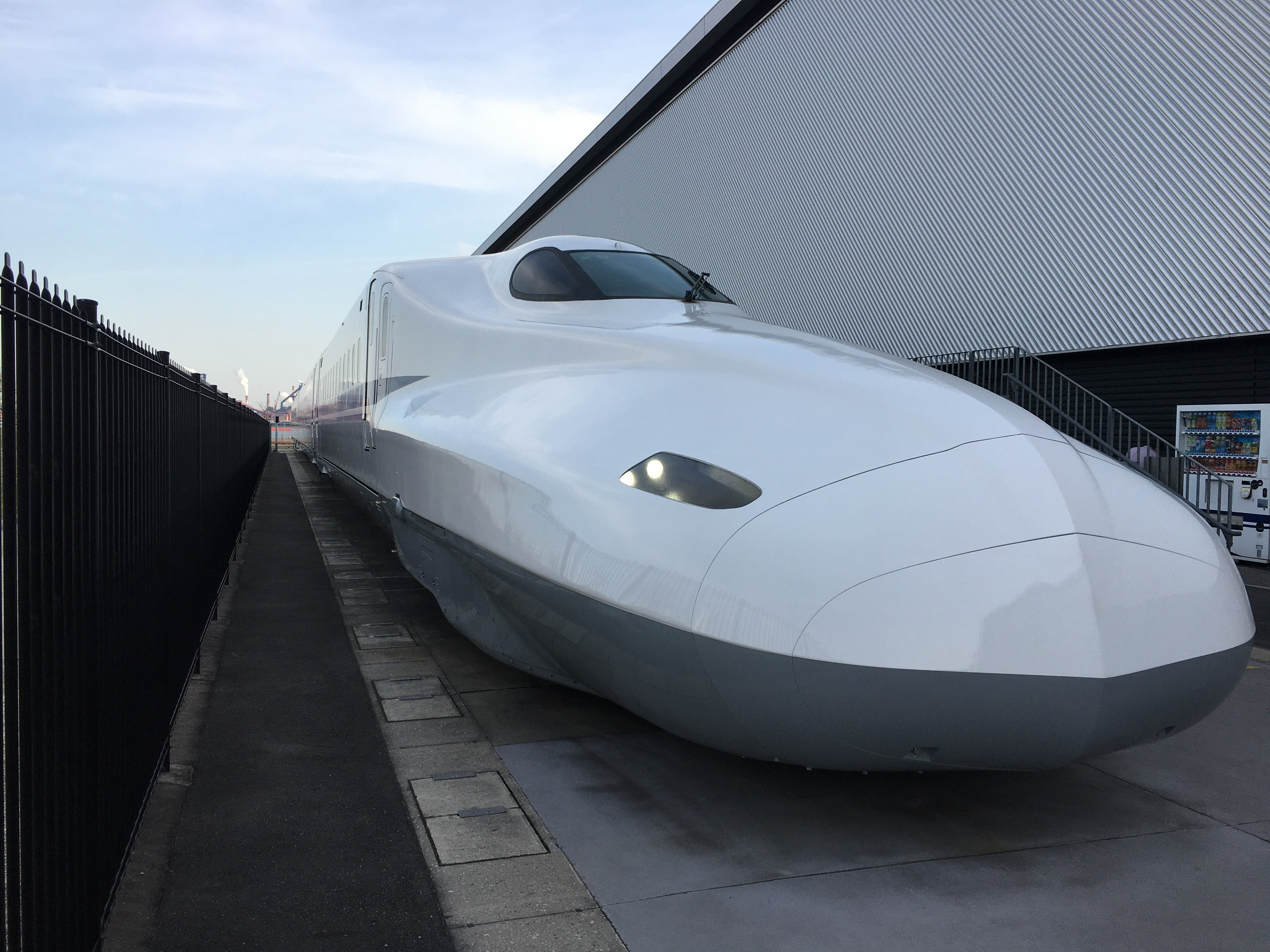
Preserved N700 unit X0, February 2020

On display at the SCMaglev and Railway Park, Nagoya, from 17 July 2019:

- 783-9001 (ex-prototype set X0, built 2005 by Hitachi)
- 775-9001 (ex-prototype set X0, built 2005 by Nippon Sharyo)
- 786-9201 (ex-prototype set X0, built 2005 by Nippon Sharyo)

== See also ==
- List of high-speed trains
