= Lange EA 42 =

Electric aero engine

- Type: Electric aero-engine
- National origin: Germany
- Manufacturer: Lange Aviation
- First run: 1995
- Major applications: Lange Antares 20E

The Lange EA 42 is an electric aero engine designed for self launching gliders. It is produced in Germany by Lange Aviation for their Antares 20E glider.

== Development ==
The EA 42 combines an EM 42 brushless 42 kW electric external rotor motor with a related engine control system and power electronics. The motor drives a two-bladed composite fixed pitch propeller with a diameter of 2 m (7 ft). It is powered by a battery pack.

== Applications ==
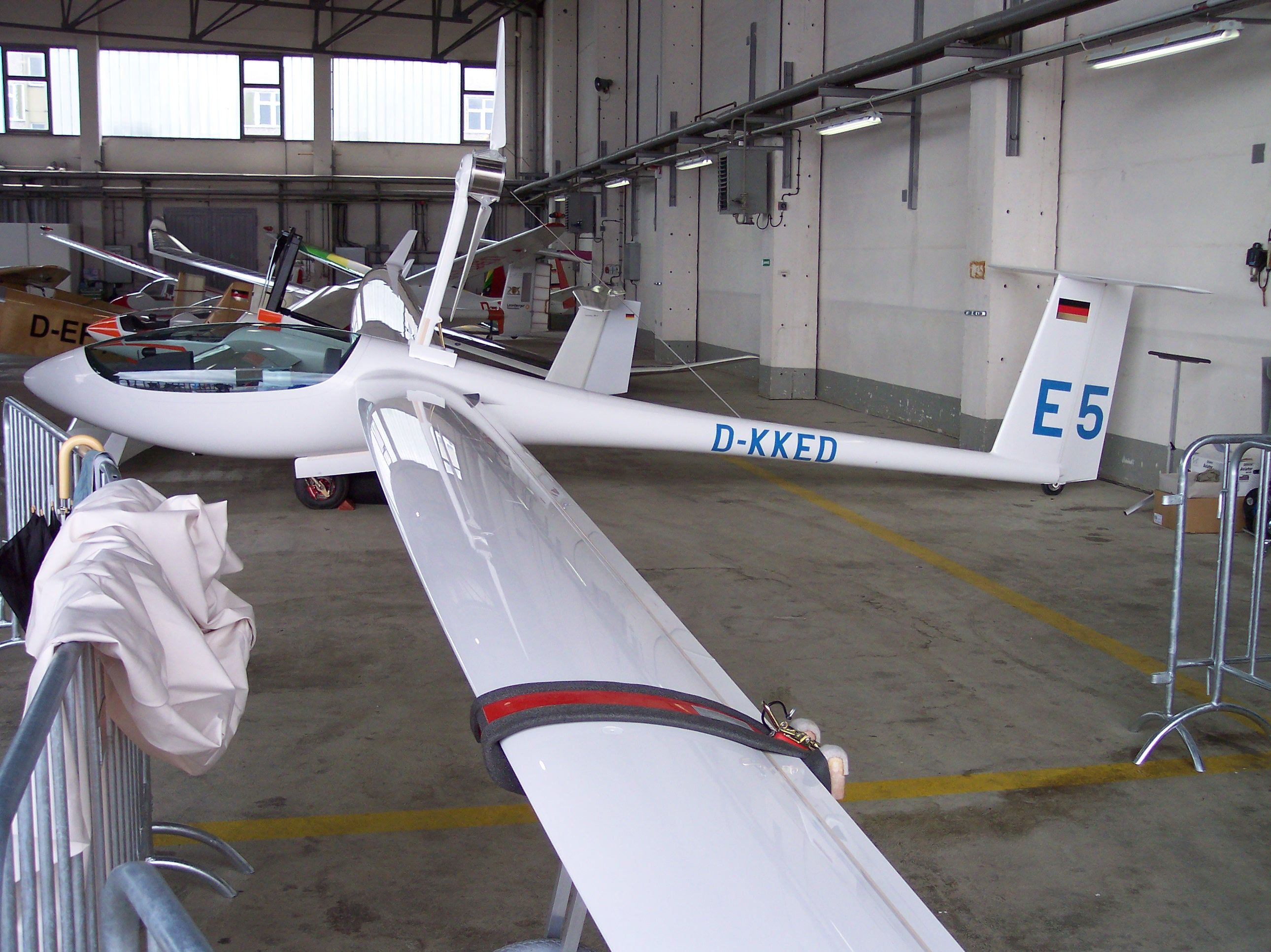
Antares 20E

- Lange Antares 20E
- Lange Antares 23E
- Schempp-Hirth Arcus E

== Specifications (EA 42) ==
=== EM42 electrical engine ===
Data from TCDS

=== General characteristics ===
- Type: Brushless electric aircraft engine
- Length: 272 mm (10.7 in)
- Diameter: 250 mm (9.8 in)
- Dry weight: 29.12 kg (64.2 lb)

=== Components ===
- Coil type: Outrunner
- Cooling system: air
- Reduction gear: none

=== Performance ===
- Power output: 38.5 kW (52 hp)
- Voltage: V nominal
- Power-to-weight ratio: 1.3 kW/kg

=== LE 42 power electronics ===
- Length: 422 mm (16.6 in)
- Width: 169 mm (6.7 in)
- Height: 208 mm (8.2 in)
- Mass: 9.58 kg (21.12 lb)
