= Schempp-Hirth Arcus =

German two-seat glider, 2009

Arcus
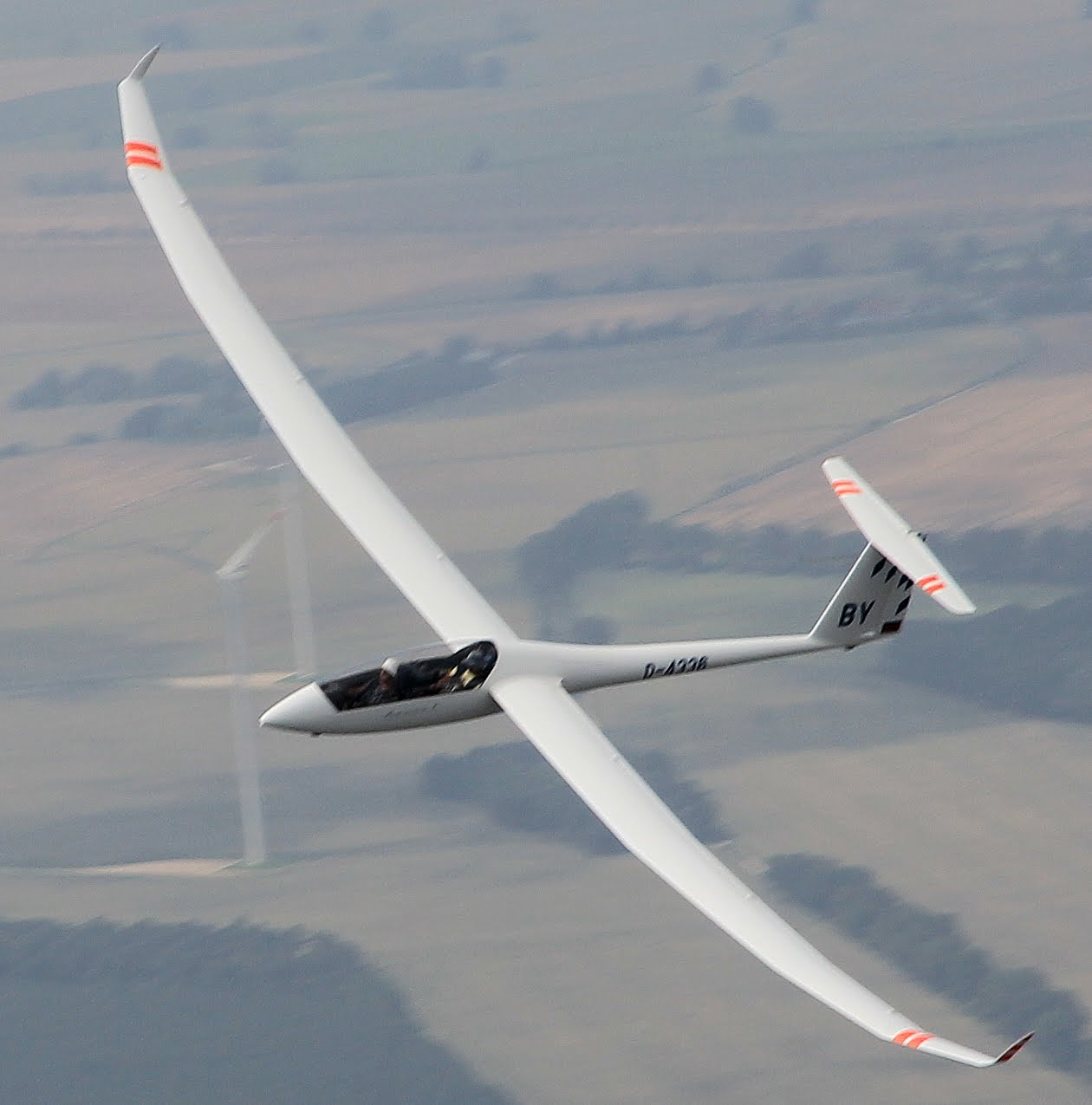

General information
- Type: Two Seater Class glider
- National origin: Germany
- Manufacturer: Schempp-Hirth
- Number built: 400 as of Dec 2023

History
- First flight: 2009

The Schempp-Hirth Arcus is a flapped Two Seater Class glider in production by Schempp-Hirth. It first flew 7 April 2009. It is offered in addition to the Duo Discus which is an unflapped 20 metre two-seater, whose fuselage it shares. The wings have flaperons integrated along the whole span.

It is available as a pure glider, a turbo using the Solo 2350-engine, and as a self-launching glider using the Solo 2625-02i. An electric power unit based on Antares 20E equipment was produced until end 2016 when cooperation with Lange stopped.

== Variants ==
Arcus
Production variant with a 20 m wingspan.
Arcus T
Production variant with self-sustaining capabilities, using the Solo 2350 engine.
Arcus M
Production variant with self-launching capabilities, using the Solo 2625-02i engine.
Arcus E
Production variant with self-launching capabilities, using the EM42 electric motor.

== Specifications ==
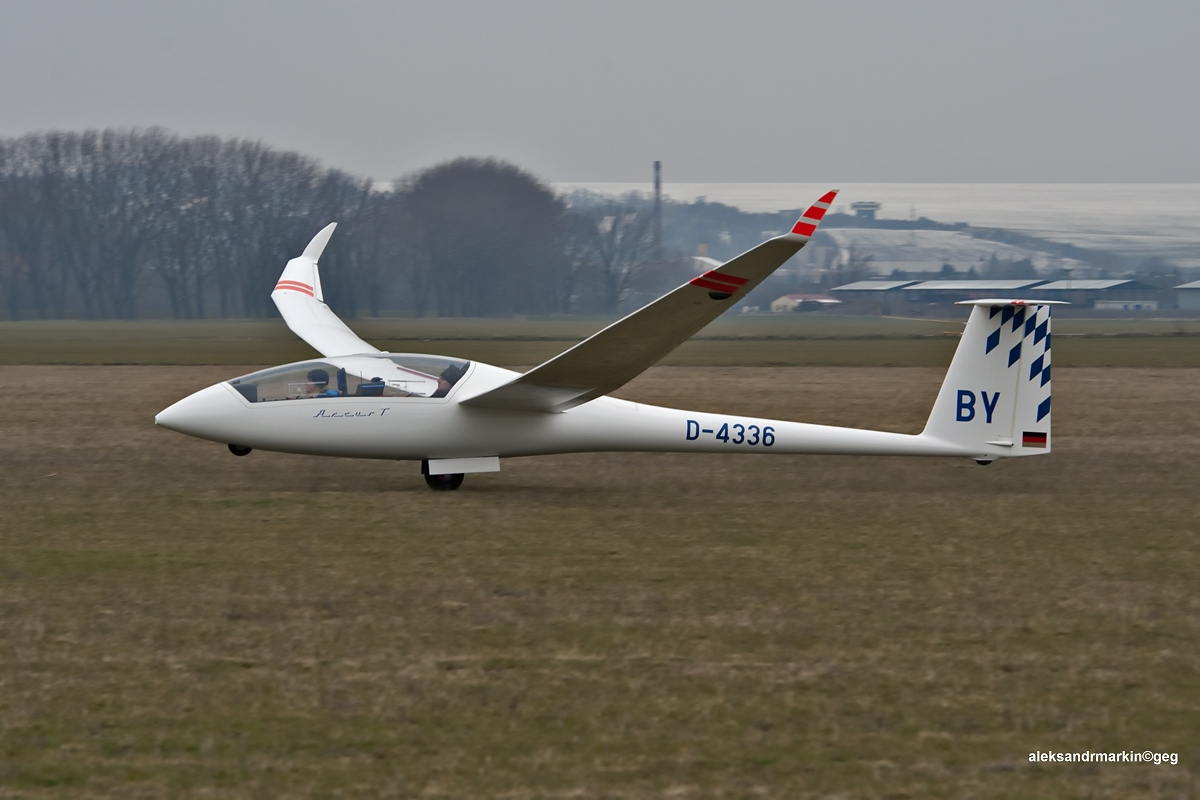
Arcus T

Data from Schempp-Hirth.

General characteristics

- Crew: Two
- Capacity: 185 kg (407) water ballast
- Length: 8.73 m (28 ft 7.7 in)
- Wingspan: 20.00 m (65 ft 7.4 in)
- Wing area: 15.6 m^{2} (167.9 sq ft)
- Aspect ratio: 25.7
- Empty weight: 430 kg (948 lb)
- Gross weight: 800 kg (1,764 lb)

Performance

- Maximum speed: 280 km/h (174 mph, 151 kn)
- Maximum glide ratio: 50
- Rate of sink: 0.56 m/s (110 ft/min)

== See also ==
Related lists

- List of gliders
