= PHB =

PHB may refer to:

== Science and technology ==
- Per-hop behaviour, in the DiffServ world
- Polyhydroxybutyrate, a biopolymer
- Prohibitin, a human gene

== Transportation ==
- Pedestrian hybrid beacon, a type of traffic signal
- Parnaíba-Prefeito Dr. João Silva Filho International Airport (IATA code), Brazil
- Phoebus Apollo Aviation (ICAO code), a small airline in South Africa

== Organisations ==
- Peterhouse Boys' School, a private boys' high school in Zimbabwe
- Platinum Habib Bank (Bank PHB), a commercial bank in Nigeria, a member of the Bank PHB Group

== Other uses ==
- Personal health budgets, a stated funded healthcare package
- Bachelor of Philosophy (PhB), a degree
- Pointy-haired boss, a character from the Dilbert cartoons
- Player's Handbook, a rulebook for role-playing game Dungeons & Dragons
- PHB (bicycle), a hydrogen bicycle
- Pig Heart Boy, a children's book by Malorie Blackman, made into a television show
- Proton Holdings Berhad, a Malaysian automotive company
