= Hydrogen vehicle =

Vehicle that uses hydrogen fuel for motive power

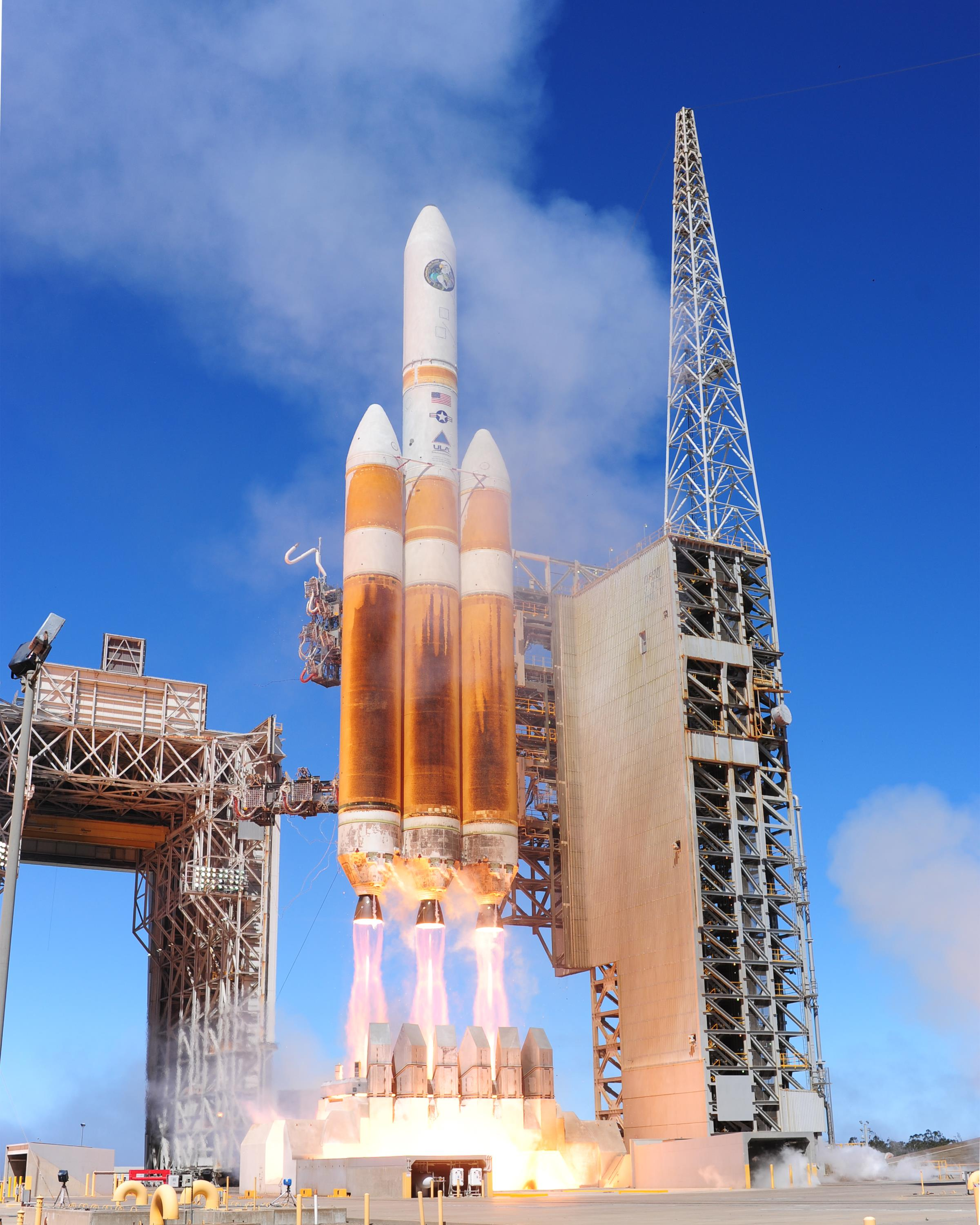
Hydrogen fuelled rockets include the Delta IV Heavy.

A hydrogen vehicle is a vehicle that uses hydrogen to move. Hydrogen vehicles include some road vehicles, rail vehicles, space rockets, forklifts, ships and aircraft. Motive power is generated by converting the chemical energy of hydrogen to mechanical energy, either by reacting hydrogen with oxygen in a fuel cell to power electric motors or, less commonly, by hydrogen internal combustion.

Hydrogen burns cleaner than fuels such as gasoline or methane but is more difficult to store and transport because of the small size of the molecule. As of the 2020s hydrogen light duty vehicles, including passenger cars, have been sold in small numbers due to competition with battery electric vehicles. As of 2021, there were two models of hydrogen cars publicly available in select markets: the Toyota Mirai (2014–), the first commercially produced dedicated fuel cell electric vehicle (FCEV), and the Hyundai Nexo (2018–). The Honda CR-V e:FCEV became available, for lease only, in very limited quantities in 2024.

As of 2019, 98% of hydrogen is produced by steam methane reforming, which emits carbon dioxide. It can be produced by electrolysis of water, or by thermochemical or pyrolytic means using renewable feedstocks, but the processes are currently expensive. Various technologies are being developed that aim to deliver costs low enough, and quantities great enough, to compete with hydrogen production using natural gas.

Vehicles running on hydrogen technology benefit from a long range on a single refuelling, but are subject to several drawbacks including high carbon emissions when hydrogen is produced from natural gas, capital cost burden, high energy inputs in production and transportation, low energy content per unit volume at ambient conditions, production and compression of hydrogen, and the investment required to build refuelling infrastructure around the world to dispense hydrogen. In addition, leaked hydrogen is an invisible, highly flammable gas and has a global warming potential 11.6 times stronger than CO_{2}.

== Vehicles ==
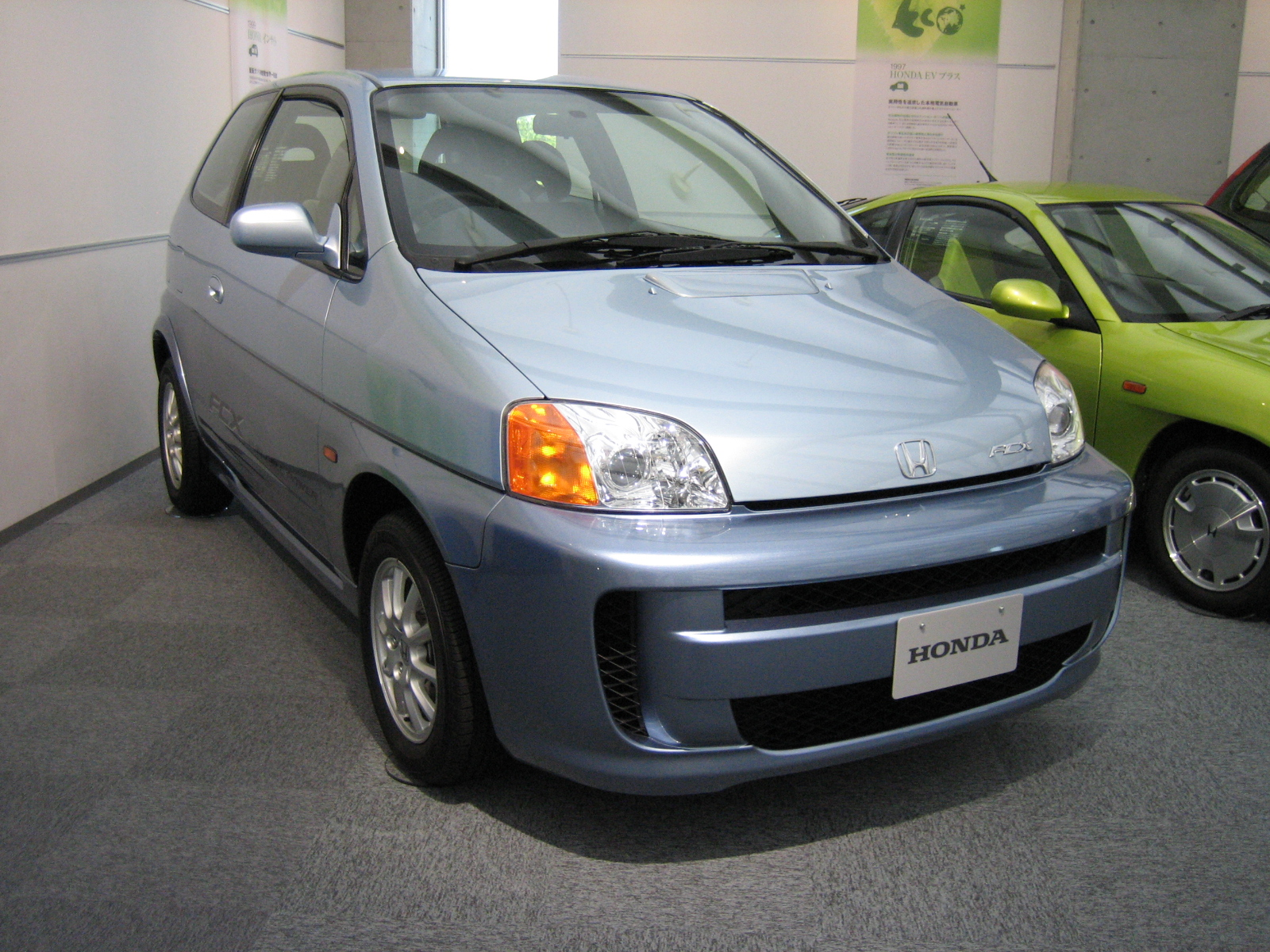
Honda FCX and Toyota FCHV, the world's first government-certified commercial fuel cell vehicles.

=== Rationale and context ===
The rationale for hydrogen vehicles lies in their potential to reduce reliance on fossil fuels, associated greenhouse gas emissions and localised air pollution from transportation. This would require hydrogen to be produced cleanly, for use in sectors and applications where cheaper and more energy efficient mitigation alternatives are limited.

=== Rockets ===
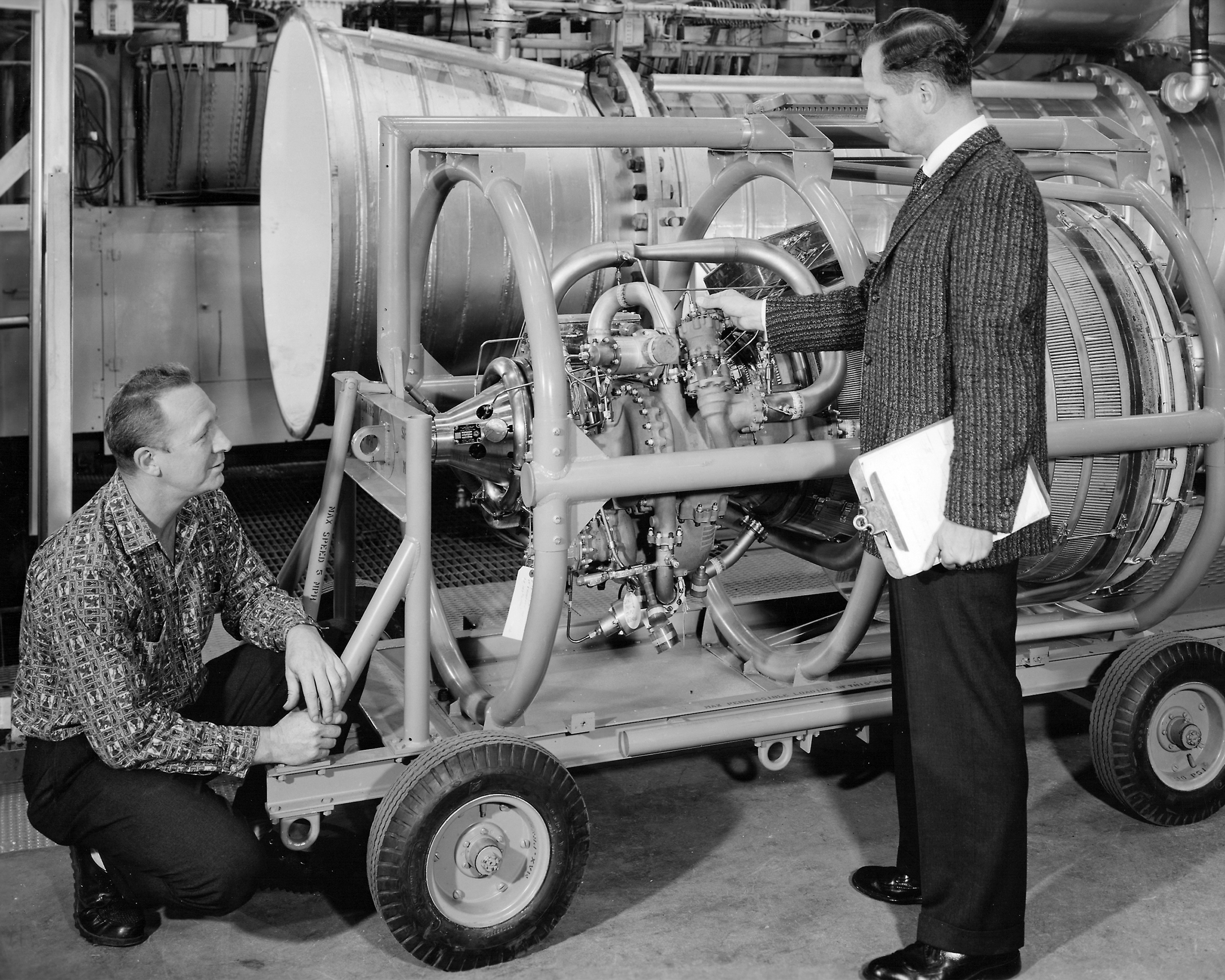
Centaur (rocket stage) was the first to use liquid hydrogen

Many large rockets use liquid hydrogen as fuel, with liquid oxygen as an oxidizer (LH2/LOX). An advantage of hydrogen rocket fuel is the high effective exhaust velocity compared to kerosene/LOX or UDMH/NTO engines. According to the Tsiolkovsky rocket equation, a rocket with higher exhaust velocity uses less propellant to accelerate. Also the energy density of hydrogen is greater than any other fuel. LH2/LOX also yields the greatest efficiency in relation to the amount of propellant consumed, of any known rocket propellant.

A disadvantage of LH2/LOX engines is the low density and low cryogenic temperature required to maintain hydrogen as a liquid, which means bigger, insulated, and thus heavier, fuel tanks are needed compared to methane, although methane is more polluting. Another disadvantage is the poor storability of LH2/LOX-powered rockets: Due to the constant hydrogen boil-off, the rocket must be fueled shortly before launch, which makes cryogenic engines unsuitable for ICBMs and other rocket applications with the need for short launch preparations. For first stages, dense fuelled rockets in studies may show a small advantage, due to the smaller vehicle size and lower air drag.

LH2/LOX were also used in the Space Shuttle to run the fuel cells that power the electrical systems. The byproduct of the fuel cell is water, which is used for drinking and other applications that require water in space.

=== Automobiles ===
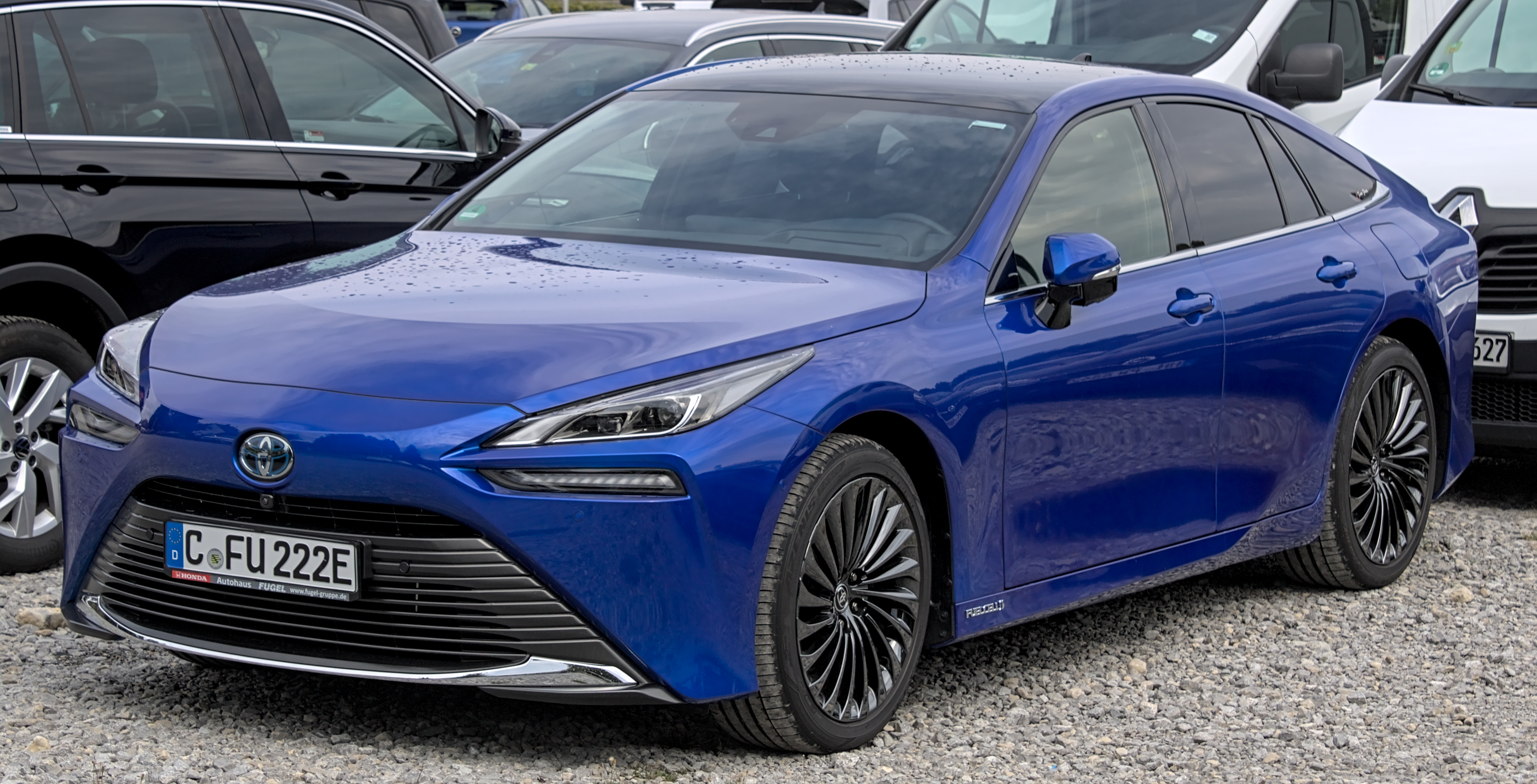
The Toyota Mirai

As of 2021, there were two hydrogen cars publicly available in select markets: the Toyota Mirai and the Hyundai Nexo. The Honda Clarity was produced from 2016 to 2021. Hydrogen combustion cars are not commercially available. In the light road vehicle segment, by the end of 2022, 70,200 fuel cell electric vehicles had been sold worldwide, compared with 26 million plug-in electric vehicles. In 2023, 3,143 hydrogen cars were sold in the US compared with 380,000 battery electric vehicles. With the rapid rise of electric vehicles and associated battery technology and infrastructure, the global scope for hydrogen's role in cars is shrinking relative to earlier expectations. John Max of Hydrogen Fuel News believes that hydrogen may, however, be used directly, or as a feedstock for efuel, to keep classic cars on the road.

The first road vehicle powered by a hydrogen fuel cell was the Chevrolet Electrovan, introduced by General Motors in 1966. The Toyota FCHV and Honda FCX, which began leasing on December 2, 2002, became the world's first government-certified commercial hydrogen fuel cell vehicles, and the Honda FCX Clarity, which began leasing in 2008, was the world's first hydrogen fuel cell vehicle designed for mass production rather than adapting an existing model. Honda established the world's first fuel cell vehicle dealer network in 2008, and at the time was the only company able to lease hydrogen fuel cell vehicles to private customers.

The 2013 Hyundai Tucson FCEV, a modified Tucson, was introduced to the market as a lease-only vehicle, and Hyundai Motors claimed it was the world's first mass-produced hydrogen fuel cell vehicle. However, due to high prices and a lack of charging infrastructure, sales fell far short of initial plans, with only 273 units sold by the end of May 2015. Hyundai Nexo, which succeeded the Tucson in 2018, was selected as the "safest SUV" by the Euro NCAP in 2018, but In October 2024, Hyundai recalled all 1,600 Nexo vehicles sold in the US to that time due to a risk of fuel leaks and fire from a faulty "pressure relief device".

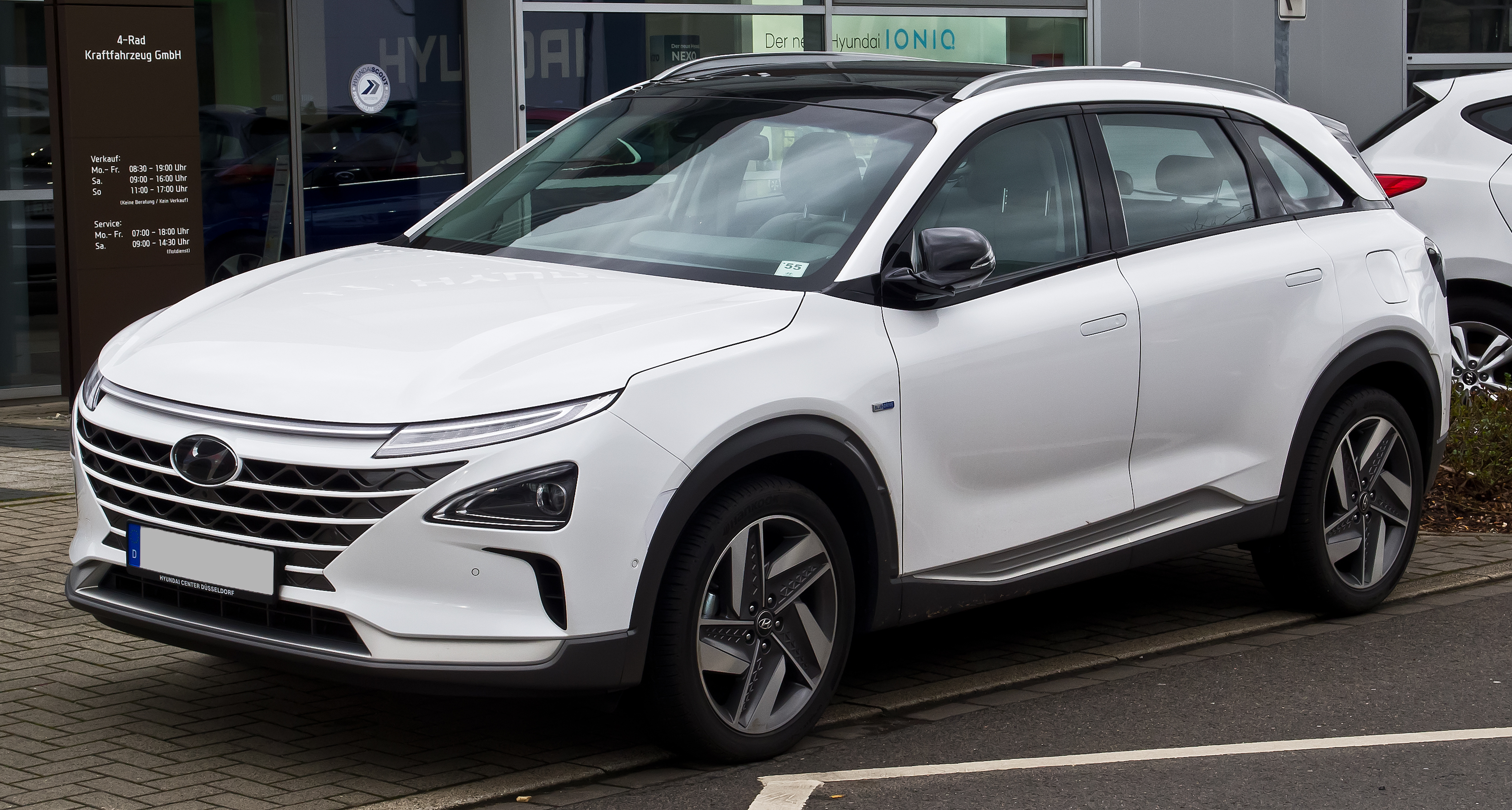
The Hyundai Nexo

Toyota launched the world's first dedicated mass-produced fuel cell vehicle (FCV), the Mirai, in Japan at the end of 2014 and began sales in California, mainly the Los Angeles area and also in selected markets in Europe, the UK, Germany and Denmark later in 2015. The car has a range of 312 mi (502 km) and takes about five minutes to refill its hydrogen tank. The initial sale price in Japan was about 7 million yen ($69,000). Former European Parliament President Pat Cox estimated that Toyota would initially lose about $100,000 on each Mirai sold. At the end of 2019, Toyota had sold over 10,000 Mirais, but in 2024 (through November), Toyota's worldwide sales fell to 1,702 hydrogen fuel cell vehicles. Many automobile companies introduced demonstration models in limited numbers (see List of fuel cell vehicles and List of hydrogen internal combustion engine vehicles).

In 2013 BMW leased hydrogen technology from Toyota, and a group formed by Ford Motor Company, Daimler AG, and Nissan announced a collaboration on hydrogen technology development. In 2015, Toyota announced that it would offer all 5,680 patents related to hydrogen fuel cell vehicles and hydrogen fuel cell charging station technology, which it has been researching for over 20 years, to its competitors free of charge to stimulate the market for hydrogen-powered vehicles. By 2017, however, Daimler had abandoned hydrogen vehicle development, and most of the automobile companies developing hydrogen cars had switched their focus to battery electric vehicles. By 2020, all but three automobile companies had abandoned plans to manufacture hydrogen cars. The Honda CR-V e:FCEV became available, for lease only, in very limited quantities in 2024.

A significant number of the public hydrogen fuel stations in California are not able to dispense hydrogen. In 2024, Mirai owners filed a class action lawsuit in California over the lack of availability of hydrogen available for fuel cell electric cars, alleging, among other things, fraudulent concealment and misrepresentation as well as violations of California’s false advertising law and breaches of implied warranty.

=== Heavy trucks ===
The International Energy Agency's 2022 net-zero emissions scenario sees hydrogen meeting approximately 30% of heavy truck energy demand in 2050, mainly for long-distance heavy freight (with battery electric power accounting for around 60%).

United Parcel Service began testing of a hydrogen powered delivery vehicle in 2017. In 2020, Hyundai began commercial production of its Xcient fuel cell trucks and shipped ten of them to Switzerland.

In 2022 in Australia, five hydrogen fuel cell class 8 trucks were placed into use to transport zinc from Sun Metals' Townsville mine to the Port of Townsville, Queensland, to be shipped around the world.

=== Aeroplanes ===
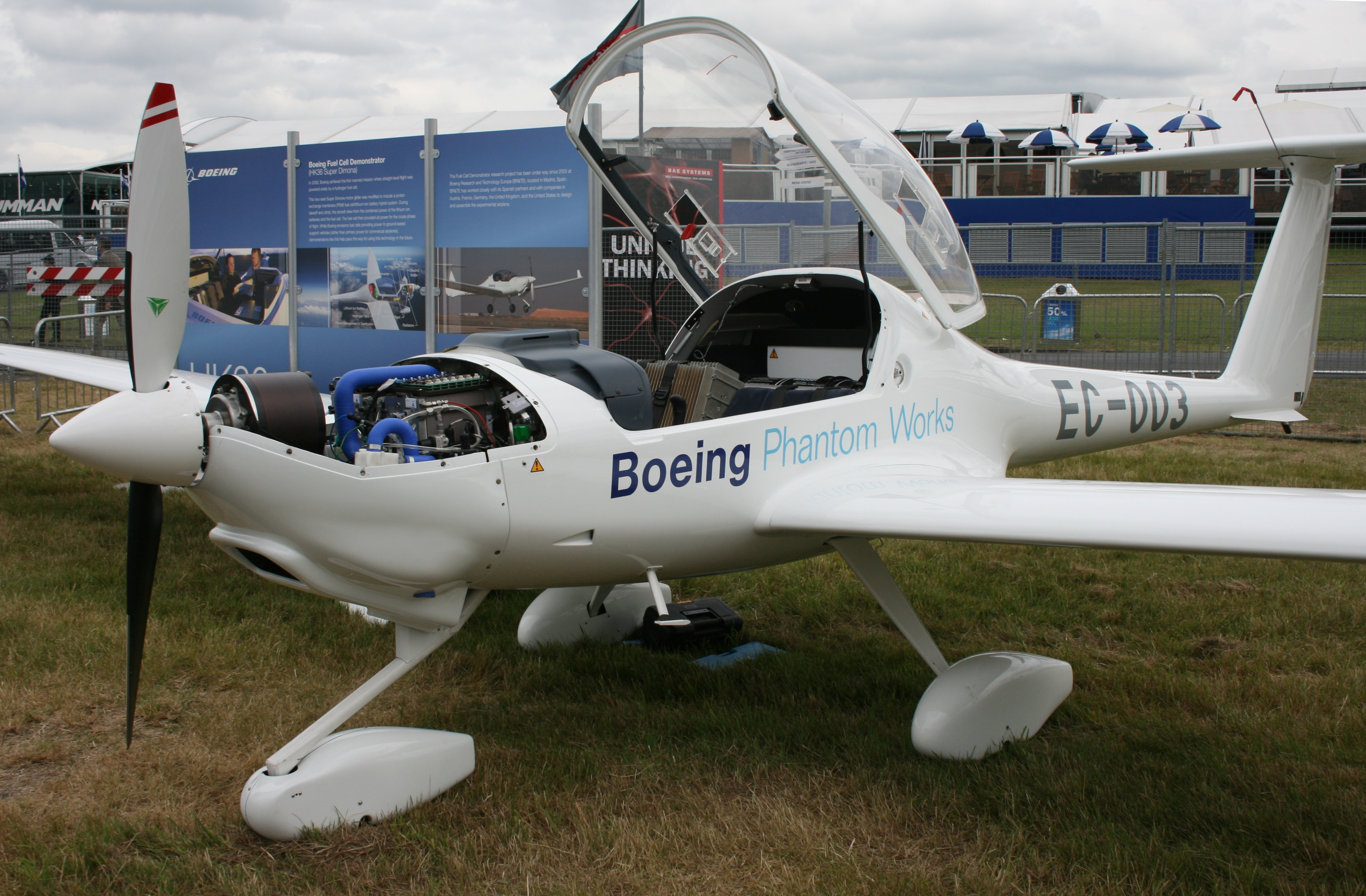
The Boeing Fuel Cell Demonstrator powered by a hydrogen fuel cell

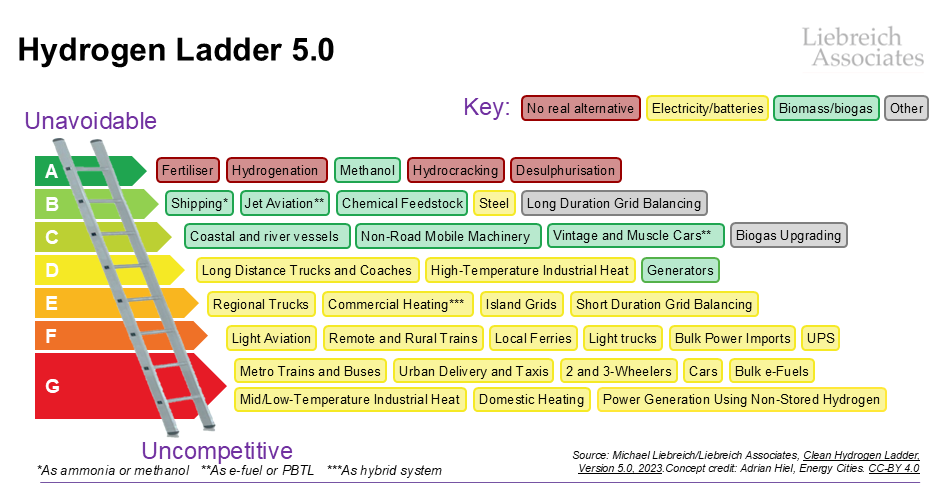
Hydrogen Ladder: Ranking of hydrogen applications and uses in the medium term.

Some publications project hydrogen may be used in shipping and jetplanes, while others predict that biofuels and batteries will have more commercial success. Companies such as Boeing, Lange Aviation, and the German Aerospace Center are pursuing hydrogen as fuel for crewed and uncrewed aeroplanes. In February 2008 Boeing tested a crewed flight of a small aircraft powered by a hydrogen fuel cell. Uncrewed hydrogen planes have also been tested. For large passenger aeroplanes, The Times reported that "Boeing said that hydrogen fuel cells were unlikely to power the engines of large passenger jet aeroplanes but could be used as backup or auxiliary power units onboard."

In July 2010, Boeing unveiled its hydrogen-powered Phantom Eye UAV, powered by two Ford internal-combustion engines that have been converted to run on hydrogen.

=== Ships ===
As of 2019 hydrogen fuel cells are not suitable for propulsion in large long-distance ships but are being considered as a range-extender for smaller, short-distance, low-speed electric vessels, such as ferries. Hydrogen in ammonia is being considered as a long-distance fuel.

=== Buses ===
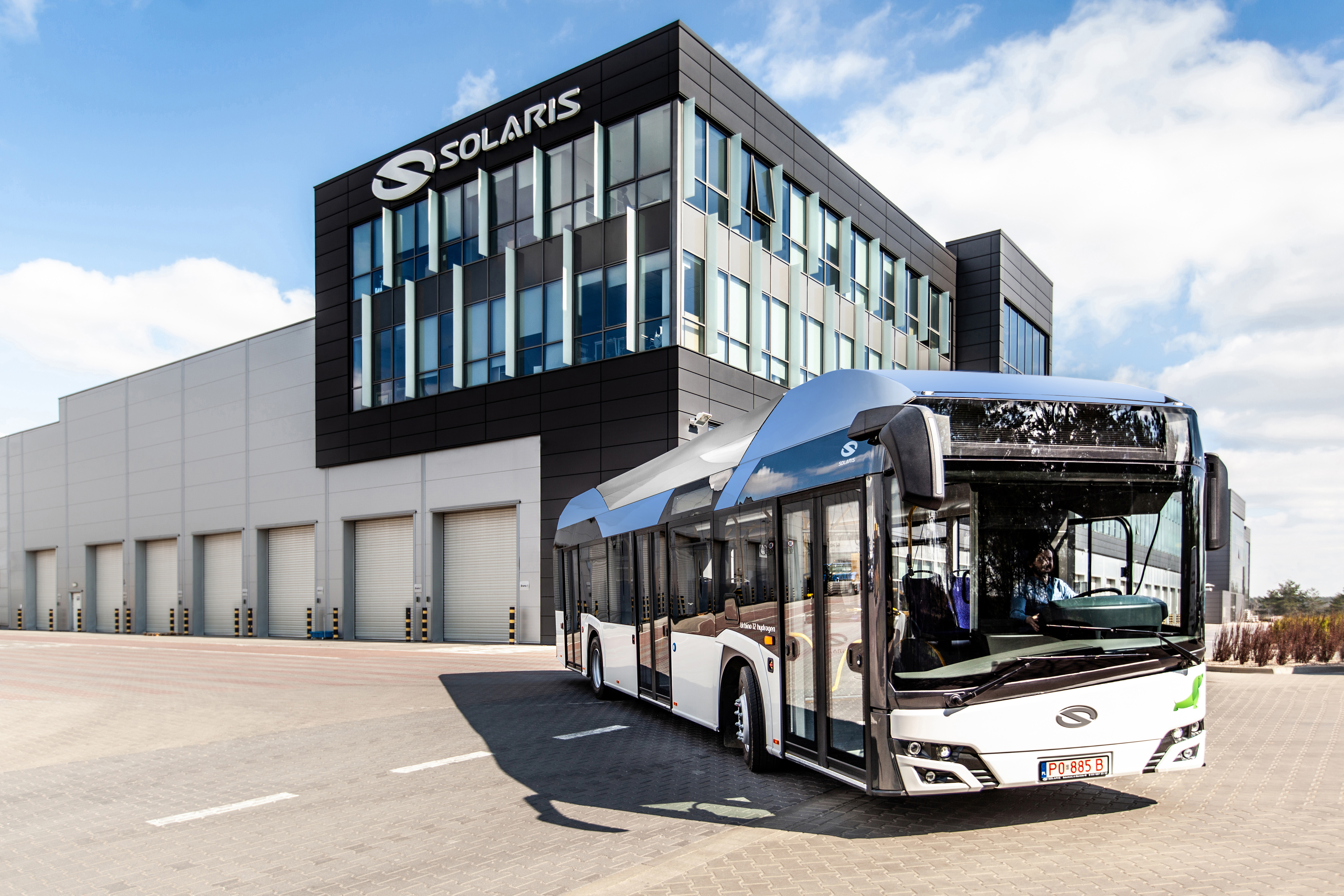
A Solaris Urbino 12 bus near its factory in Bolechowo, Poland

Fuel-cell buses were trialed in Ursus Lublin in 2017. Solaris Bus & Coach introduced its Urbino 12 hydrogen electric buses in 2019. Several dozen were ordered. The first city in the U.S. to have a fleet of hydrogen powered buses was Champaign, Illinois, when in 2021 the Champaign–Urbana Mass Transit District ordered two New Flyer XHE60 articulated hydrogen fuel cell buses, with 10 more New Flyer XHE40 buses added in 2024.

In 2022, the city of Montpellier, France, cancelled a contract to procure 51 buses powered by hydrogen fuel cells, when it found that "the cost of operation for hydrogen [buses] is 6 times the cost of electricity". By 2025, most hydrogen bus programs in Europe had been cancelled or fuel cell bus purchases discontinued.

=== Fork trucks ===
A hydrogen internal combustion engine (or "HICE") forklift or HICE lift truck is a hydrogen fueled, internal combustion engine-powered industrial forklift truck used for lifting and transporting materials. The first production HICE forklift truck based on the Linde X39 Diesel was presented at an exposition in Hannover on May 27, 2008. It used a 2.0 litre, 43 kW (58 hp) diesel internal combustion engine converted to use hydrogen as a fuel with the use of a compressor and direct injection.

In 2013 there were over 4,000 fuel cell forklifts used in material handling in the US. As of 2024, approximately 50,000 hydrogen forklifts are in operation worldwide (the bulk of which are in the U.S.), as compared with 1.2 million battery electric forklifts that were purchased in 2021.

Most companies in Europe and the US do not use petroleum powered forklifts, as these vehicles work indoors where emissions must be controlled and instead use electric forklifts. Fuel-cell-powered forklifts can be refueled in 3 minutes. They can be used in refrigerated warehouses, as their performance is not degraded by lower temperatures. The fuel cell units are often designed as drop-in replacements.

=== Trams and trains ===
India's first Hydrogen train, showing the Hydrogen storage module, battery stacks and fuel cell.

In the International Energy Agency’s 2022 Net Zero Emissions Scenario, hydrogen is forecast to account for 2% of rail energy demand in 2050, while 90% of rail travel is expected to be electrified by then (up from 45% today). Hydrogen’s role in rail would likely be focused on lines that prove difficult or costly to electrify.

In March 2015, China South Rail Corporation (CSR) demonstrated a hydrogen fuel cell-powered tramcar at an assembly facility in Qingdao. Tracks for the new vehicle were built in seven Chinese cities. In northern Germany in 2018 fuel-cell powered Coradia iLint trains were first placed into service; excess power is stored in lithium-ion batteries.

By 2025, hydrogen powered trains had also been introduced in France and Sweden; in India, a Hydrogen train with 1200 hp, capable of carrying 2,600 passengers, is set to run between Sonipat and Jind in Haryana. However, the same year there was bad news for some of Europe's hydrogen train companies: France's Alstom announced that it is halting development of hydrogen trains and redeploying some research staff with the withdrawal of government funding, and in Germany, Rhine-Main Transport Authority withdrew its 18 hydrogen-powered trains after "repeated technical issues with the hydrogen fuel cells"; Siemens Mobility has also had problems with its hydrogen trains.

=== Bicycles and stand-up scooters ===
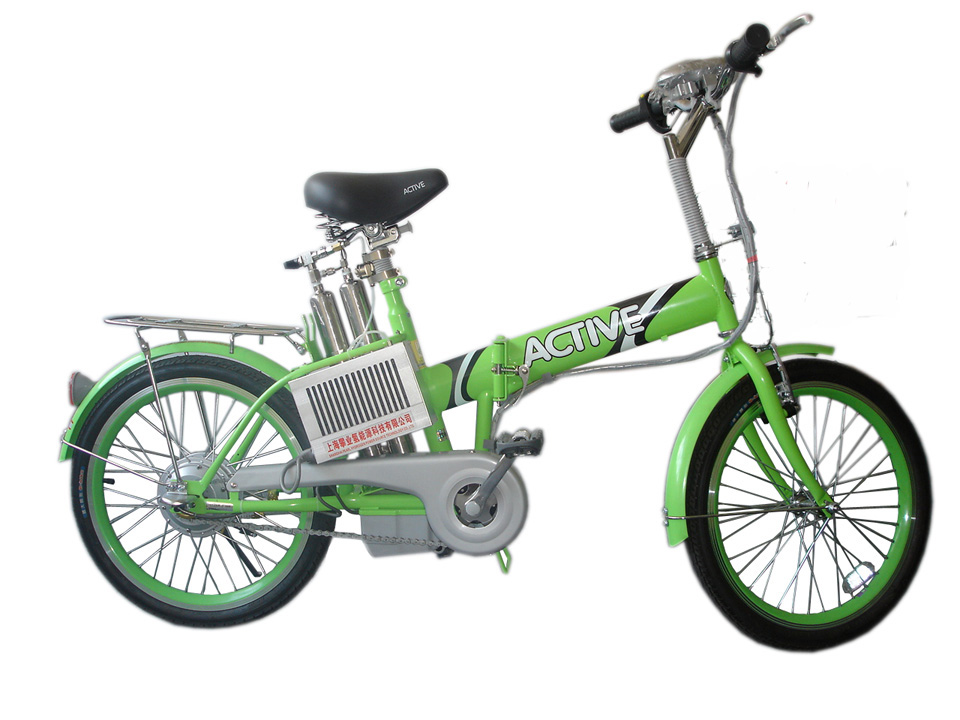
PHB hydrogen bicycle

In 2007, Pearl Hydrogen Power Source Technology Co of Shanghai, China, demonstrated a PHB hydrogen bicycle. In 2014, Australian scientists from the University of New South Wales presented their Hy-Cycle model. The same year, Canyon Bicycles started to work on the Eco Speed concept bicycle.

In 2017, Pragma Industries of France developed a bicycle that was able to travel 100 km on a single hydrogen cylinder. In 2019, Pragma announced that the product, "Alpha Bike", has been improved to offer an electrically assisted pedalling range of 150 km, and the first 200 of the bikes are to be provided to journalists covering the 45th G7 summit in Biarritz, France.

In 2020, Alles over Waterstof developed a 2-wheel hydrogen powered stand-up scooter. The stand-up scooter has a range of over 20 km on 15 grams of hydrogen. It uses a swappable 1 litre 200 bar hydrogen cylinder. In 2021 the company developed a hydrogen powered cargo-bike, using a static 3 litre 300 bar refillable hydrogen cylinder. The HydroCargo bike has a range of up to 100 km on 80 grams of hydrogen.

Lloyd Alter of TreeHugger responded to the announcement, asking "why … go through the trouble of using electricity to make hydrogen, only to turn it back into electricity to charge a battery to run the e-bike [or] pick a fuel that needs an expensive filling station that can only handle 35 bikes a day, when you can charge a battery powered bike anywhere. [If] you were a captive fleet operator, why [not] just swap out batteries to get the range and the fast turnover?"

=== Military vehicles ===
General Motors' military division, GM Defense, focuses on hydrogen fuel cell vehicles. Its SURUS (Silent Utility Rover Universal Superstructure) is a flexible fuel cell electric platform with autonomous capabilities. Since April 2017, the U.S. Army has been testing the commercial Chevrolet Colorado ZH2 on its U.S. bases to determine the viability of hydrogen-powered vehicles in military mission tactical environments.

=== Motorcycles and scooters ===
ENV develops electric motorcycles powered by a hydrogen fuel cell, including the Crosscage and Biplane. Other manufacturers as Vectrix are working on hydrogen scooters. Finally, hydrogen-fuel-cell-electric-hybrid scooters are being made such as the Suzuki Burgman fuel-cell scooter and the FHybrid. The Burgman received "whole vehicle type" approval in the EU. The Taiwanese company APFCT conducted a live street test with 80 fuel-cell scooters for Taiwan's Bureau of Energy.

=== Auto rickshaws ===
Hydrogen auto rickshaw concept vehicles have been built by Mahindra HyAlfa and Bajaj Auto.

=== Quads and tractors ===
H-Due, made by Autostudi S.r.l, is a hydrogen-powered quad capable of transporting 1-3 passengers. A concept for a hydrogen-powered tractor has been proposed.

==== Auto racing ====
A record of 207.297 miles per hour (333.612 km/h) was set by a prototype Ford Fusion Hydrogen 999 Fuel Cell Race Car at the Bonneville Salt Flats, in August 2007, using a large compressed oxygen tank to increase power. The land-speed record for a hydrogen-powered vehicle of 286.476 miles per hour (461.038 km/h) was set by Ohio State University's Buckeye Bullet 2, which achieved a "flying-mile" speed of 280.007 miles per hour (450.628 km/h) at the Bonneville Salt Flats in August 2008.

In 2007, the Hydrogen Electric Racing Federation was formed as a racing organization for hydrogen fuel cell-powered vehicles. The organization sponsored the Hydrogen 500, a 500-mile race.

== Internal combustion vehicle ==
Hydrogen internal combustion engine cars are different from hydrogen fuel cell cars. The hydrogen internal combustion car is a slightly modified version of the traditional gasoline internal combustion engine car. These hydrogen engines burn fuel in the same manner that gasoline engines do; the main difference is the exhaust product. Gasoline combustion results in emissions of mostly carbon dioxide and water, plus trace amounts of carbon monoxide, NO_{x}, particulates and unburned hydrocarbons, while the main exhaust product of hydrogen combustion is water vapor.

In 1807 François Isaac de Rivaz designed the first hydrogen-fueled internal combustion engine. In 1965, Roger E. Billings, then a high school student, converted a Model A to run on hydrogen. In 1970 Paul Dieges patented a modification to internal combustion engines which allowed a gasoline-powered engine to run on hydrogen.

Mazda has developed Wankel engines burning hydrogen, which are used in the Mazda RX-8 Hydrogen RE. The advantage of using an internal combustion engine, like Wankel and piston engines, is the lower cost of retooling for production.

== Fuel cell ==
=== Fuel cell cost ===
Hydrogen fuel cells are relatively expensive to produce, as their designs require rare substances, such as platinum, as a catalyst. In 2014, former European Parliament President Pat Cox estimated that Toyota would initially lose about $100,000 on each Mirai sold. In 2020, researchers at the University of Copenhagen's Department of Chemistry are developing a new type of catalyst that they hope will decrease the cost of fuel cells. This new catalyst uses far less platinum because the platinum nano-particles are not coated over carbon which, in conventional hydrogen fuel cells, keeps the nano-particles in place but also causes the catalyst to become unstable and denatures it slowly, requiring even more platinum. The new technology uses durable nanowires instead of the nano-particles. "The next step for the researchers is to scale up their results so that the technology can be implemented in hydrogen vehicles."

=== Freezing conditions ===
The problems in early fuel-cell designs at low temperatures concerning range and cold start capabilities have been addressed so that they "cannot be seen as show-stoppers anymore". Users in 2014 said that their fuel cell vehicles continue to operate in temperatures below zero without significantly reducing range. Studies using neutron radiography on unassisted cold-start indicate ice formation in the cathode, three stages in cold start and Nafion ionic conductivity. A parameter, defined as coulomb of charge, was also defined to measure cold start capability.

=== Service life ===
The service life of fuel cells is comparable to that of other vehicles. Polymer-electrolyte membrane (PEM) fuel cell service life is 7,300 hours under cycling conditions.

== Hydrogen ==
Hydrogen does not exist in convenient reservoirs or deposits like fossil fuels or helium. It is produced from feedstocks such as natural gas and biomass or electrolyzed from water. A suggested benefit of large-scale deployment of hydrogen vehicles is that it could lead to decreased emissions of greenhouse gases and ozone precursors. However, as of 2014, 95% of hydrogen is made from methane. It can be produced by thermochemical or pyrolitic means using renewable feedstocks, but that is an expensive process.

Renewable electricity can however be used to power the conversion of water into hydrogen: Integrated wind-to-hydrogen (power to gas) plants, using electrolysis of water, are exploring technologies to deliver costs low enough, and quantities great enough, to compete with traditional energy sources. The challenges facing the use of hydrogen in vehicles include its storage on board the vehicle. As of September 2023, hydrogen cost $36 per kilogram at public fueling stations in California, 14 times as much per mile for a Mirai as compared with a Tesla Model 3.

=== Production ===
The molecular hydrogen needed as an onboard fuel for hydrogen vehicles can be obtained through many thermochemical methods utilizing natural gas, coal (by a process known as coal gasification), liquefied petroleum gas, biomass (biomass gasification), by a process called thermolysis, or as a microbial waste product called biohydrogen or Biological hydrogen production. 95% of hydrogen is produced using natural gas. Hydrogen can be produced from water by electrolysis at working efficiencies of 65–70%. Hydrogen can be made by chemical reduction using chemical hydrides or aluminum. Current technologies for manufacturing hydrogen use energy in various forms, totaling between 25 and 50 percent of the higher heating value of the hydrogen fuel, used to produce, compress or liquefy, and transmit the hydrogen by pipeline or truck.

Environmental consequences of the production of hydrogen from fossil energy resources include the emission of greenhouse gasses, a consequence that would also result from the on-board reforming of methanol into hydrogen. Hydrogen production using renewable energy resources would not create such emissions, but the scale of renewable energy production would need to be expanded to be used in producing hydrogen for a significant part of transportation needs. In a few countries, renewable sources are being used more widely to produce energy and hydrogen. For example, Iceland is using geothermal power to produce hydrogen, and Denmark is using wind.

=== Storage ===
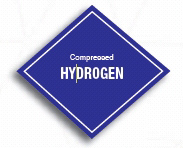
Compressed hydrogen storage mark

Compressed hydrogen in hydrogen tanks at 350 bar (5,000 psi) and 700 bar (10,000 psi) is used for hydrogen tank systems in vehicles, based on type IV carbon-composite technology.

Hydrogen has a very low volumetric energy density at ambient conditions, compared with gasoline and other vehicle fuels. It must be stored in a vehicle either as a super-cooled liquid or as highly compressed gas, which require additional energy to accomplish. In 2018, researchers at CSIRO in Australia powered a Toyota Mirai and Hyundai Nexo with hydrogen separated from ammonia using a membrane technology. Ammonia is easier to transport safely in tankers than pure hydrogen.

=== Infrastructure ===
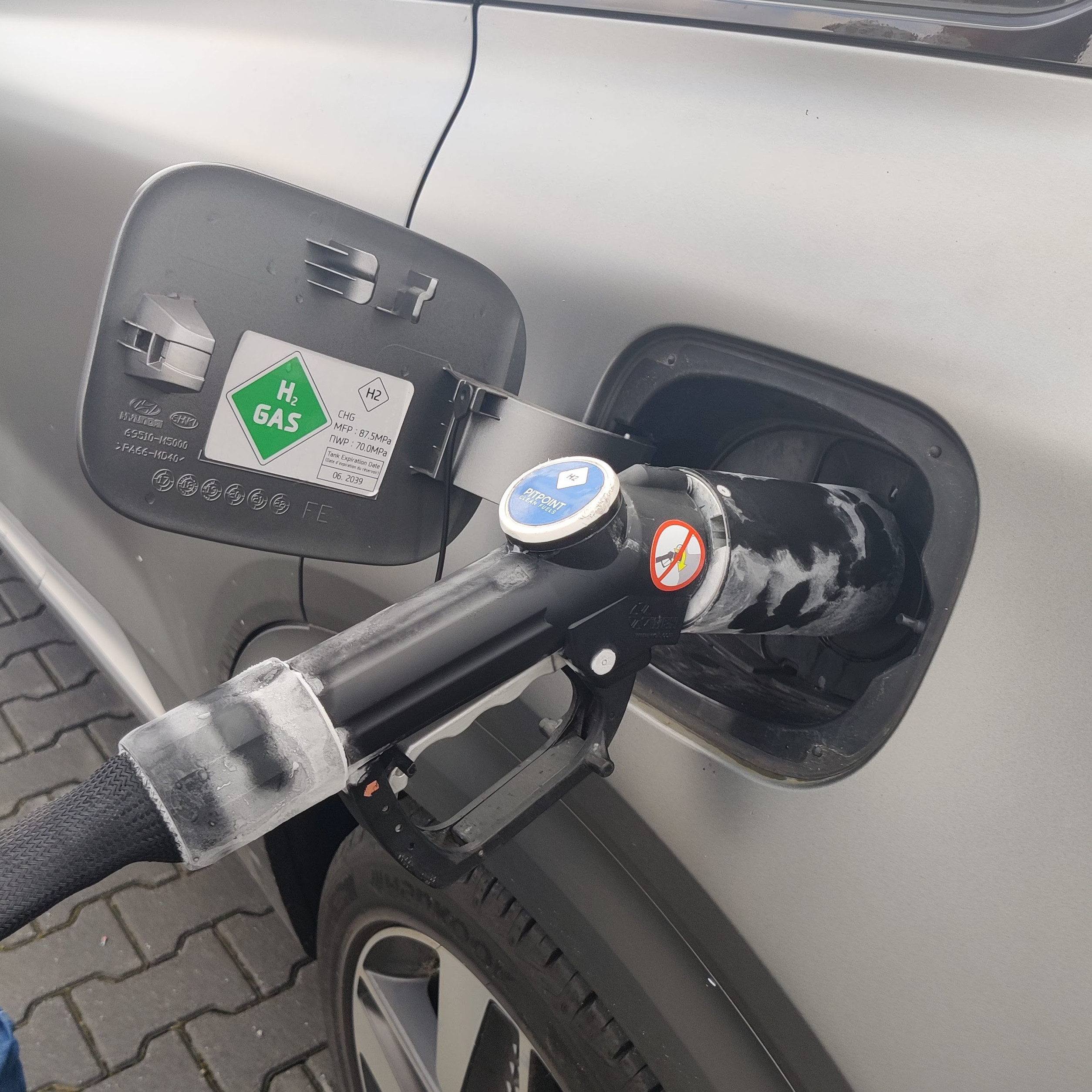
The refueling of a Hydrogen-powered vehicle. The vehicle is a Hyundai Nexo. Condensation around the handle due to the hydrogen gas expanding, caused the handle to freeze.

To enable the delivery of hydrogen fuel to transport end-users, a broad range of investments are needed, including, according to the International Energy Agency (IEA), the "construction and operation of new port infrastructure, buffer storage, pipelines, ships, refueling stations and plants to convert the hydrogen into a more readily transportable commodity (and potentially back to hydrogen)". In particular, the IEA notes that refueling stations will be needed in locations that are suitable for long‐distance trucking such as industrial hubs and identifies the need for investment in airport infrastructure for the storage and delivery of hydrogen. The IEA deems the infrastructure requirements for hydrogen in shipping more challenging, drawing attention to the "need for major investments and co‐ordinated efforts among fuel suppliers, ports, shipbuilders and shippers".

As of 2024, there were 53 publicly accessible hydrogen refueling stations in the US, 52 of which were located in California (compared with 65,000 electric charging stations). By 2017, there were 91 hydrogen fueling stations in Japan. In 2024, Mirai owners filed a class action lawsuit in California over the lack of availability of hydrogen available for fuel cell electric cars, alleging, among other things, fraudulent concealment and misrepresentation as well as violations of California’s false advertising law and breaches of implied warranty.

=== Codes and standards ===
Hydrogen codes and standards, as well as codes and technical standards for hydrogen safety and the storage of hydrogen, have been an institutional barrier to deploying hydrogen technologies. To enable the commercialization of hydrogen in consumer products, new codes and standards must be developed and adopted by federal, state and local governments.

== Official support ==
=== U.S. initiatives ===
Fuel cell buses are supported.

The New York State Energy Research and Development Authority (NYSERDA) has created incentives for hydrogen fuel cell electric trucks and buses.

== Criticism of hydrogen cars ==
Critics argue that implementing wide-scale use of hydrogen in cars is unlikely during at least the next several decades and that the hydrogen car is a dangerous distraction from more readily available solutions to reducing the use of fossil fuels in vehicles.

Former U.S. Department of Energy official Joseph Romm has said: "A hydrogen car is one of the least efficient, most expensive ways to reduce greenhouse gases." He has argued that the cost to build out a nationwide network of hydrogen refueling stations would be prohibitive. Robert Zubrin, the author of Energy Victory, stated: "Hydrogen is 'just about the worst possible vehicle fuel'". As of 2024, more than 95% hydrogen was still produced using steam methane reformation (about 95% is grey hydrogen, most of the rest is blue hydrogen, and only about 1% is green hydrogen), which creates at least as much emission of carbon per mile as today's gasoline cars, but even if more hydrogen could be produced using renewable energy, "it would surely be easier simply to use this energy to charge the batteries of all-electric or plug-in hybrid vehicles." Over their lifetimes, hydrogen vehicles will emit more carbon than gasoline vehicles. The Washington Post asked in 2009, "[W]hy would you want to store energy in the form of hydrogen and then use that hydrogen to produce electricity for a motor, when electrical energy is already waiting to be sucked out of sockets all over America and stored in auto batteries"?

Volkswagen's Rudolf Krebs said in 2013: "Hydrogen mobility only makes sense if you use green energy", but ... you need to convert it first into hydrogen "with low efficiencies" where "you lose about 40 percent of the initial energy". You then must compress the hydrogen and store it under high pressure in tanks, which uses more energy. "And then you have to convert the hydrogen back to electricity in a fuel cell with another efficiency loss". Krebs continued: "in the end, from your original 100 percent of electric energy, you end up with 30 to 40 percent." A 2016 study in Energy by scientists at Stanford University and the Technical University of Munich concluded that, even assuming local hydrogen production, "investing in all-electric battery vehicles is a more economical choice for reducing carbon dioxide emissions".

A 2017 analysis published in Green Car Reports concluded that the best hydrogen-fuel-cell vehicles consume "more than three times more electricity per mile than an electric vehicle ... generate more greenhouse gas emissions than other powertrain technologies ... [and have] very high fuel costs. ... Considering all the obstacles and requirements for new infrastructure (estimated to cost as much as $400 billion), fuel-cell vehicles seem likely to be a niche technology at best, with little impact on U.S. oil consumption. The US Department of Energy agrees, for fuel produced by grid electricity via electrolysis, but not for most other pathways for generation. A 2019 video by Real Engineering concluded that the hydrogen needed to move a FCV a kilometer costs approximately 8 times as much as the electricity needed to move a BEV the same distance.

Assessments since 2020 have concluded that hydrogen vehicles are still only 38% efficient, while battery EVs are from 80% to 95% efficient. A 2021 assessment by CleanTechnica found that the vast majority of hydrogen was being produced was still polluting grey hydrogen, and delivering hydrogen would require building a vast and expensive new infrastructure, while the remaining two "advantages of fuel cell vehicles – longer range and fast fueling times – are rapidly being eroded by improving battery and charging technology." A 2022 study in Nature Electronics agreed. Another 2022 article, in Recharge News, stated that ships are more likely to be powered by ammonia or methanol than hydrogen. Also in 2022, Germany's Fraunhofer Institute concluded that hydrogen is unlikely to play a major role in road transport.

A 2023 study by the Centre for International Climate and Environmental Research (CICERO) estimated that leaked hydrogen has a global warming effect 11.6 times stronger than CO_{2}.

== Safety and supply ==
Hydrogen fuel is hazardous because of the low ignition energy (see also autoignition temperature) and high combustion energy of hydrogen, and because it tends to leak easily from tanks due to its small molecular size. In 2024, Hyundai recalled all 1,600 Nexo vehicles sold in the US to that time due to a risk of fuel leaks and fire from a faulty "pressure relief device". Hydrogen embrittlement is also a concern for the storage tank material, as well as the car parts surrounding the tank if chronic leakage is present. Hydrogen is odorless so leakages are not easily picked up without specialized detectors.

Explosions at hydrogen filling stations have been reported. Hydrogen fuelling stations generally receive deliveries of hydrogen by truck from hydrogen suppliers. An interruption at a hydrogen supply facility can shut down multiple hydrogen fuelling stations.

== Comparison with other types of alternative fuel vehicle ==
Hydrogen vehicles compete with various proposed alternatives to the modern fossil fuel internal combustion engine (ICE) vehicle infrastructure.

=== Natural gas ===
ICE-based compressed natural gas (CNG), HCNG, LPG or LNG vehicles, collectively called natural gas vehicles (NGVs), use methane harvested from natural gas or Biogas as a fuel source. Methane has a higher energy density than hydrogen, and NGVs from Biogas are nearly carbon neutral. Unlike hydrogen vehicles, CNG vehicle technology has been available for many decades, and there is sufficient infrastructure in existing filling stations to provide both commercial and home refueling. Worldwide, there were 14.8 million natural gas vehicles by the end of 2011, mostly in the form of bi-fuel vehicles. The other use for natural gas is in steam reforming which is the common way to produce hydrogen gas for use in electric cars with fuel cells.

Methane is also an alternative rocket fuel.

=== Plug-in electric ===
==== Plug-in hybrid ====
Plug-in hybrid electric vehicles (PHEVs) are hybrid electric vehicles that can be plugged into the electric grid to recharge the on-board battery pack, rather than relying purely on the internal combustion engine to drive a generator to power the electric motor and battery pack as in conventional hybrid vehicles. The PHEV concept augments the vehicle's fuel efficiency by allowing more EV mode driving, at the same time alleviating range anxiety by having the internal combustion engine (typically a turbo petrol engine) as an auxiliary powerplant or range extender.

==== Battery electric ====
In the light road vehicle segment, by 2023, 26 million battery electric vehicles had been sold worldwide, and there were 65,730 public charging stations in North America, in addition to the availability of home and workplace charging via AC power plugs and sockets. Long distance electric trucks require more megawatt charging infrastructure.

=== Aviation biofuel ===
Hannah Ritchie has argued that there may not be enough land to produce enough aviation biofuel.

== See also ==
- Airship
- Alternative fuel vehicle
- Bivalent engine
- Carbon-neutral fuel
- Hydrogen transport
- Hydrogen economy
- The Hype about Hydrogen
- Hydrogen fuel enhancement
