= Binder EB28 =

Two-seat German motor glider

EB28

General information
- Type: Open-class self-launched sailplane
- National origin: Germany
- Manufacturer: Binder Motorenbau

History
- First flight: 1986

The Binder EB28 is a German two-seat, open-class self-launching powered sailplane designed and built by Binder Motorenbau. It first flew in 1986.

The EB28 is a composite-built two-seat shoulder-wing monoplane with a conventional T-type tailplane. It has a retractable central landing gear with a fixed tail wheel. The wing has Schempp-Hirth airbrakes on the upper wing surface and is fitted with water ballast tanks in the wing and vertical tail. The EB28 has a retractable engine for self-launching and a safety hook for aero-towing.

It was developed into the single-seat Binder EB29.

== Variants ==
EB28
Production two-seat variant.
EB28 edition
Production two-seat variant with optional mechanical or electrical landing gear retraction and the ability to change the span of the wings. The standard EB28 can be modified to edition variant. The wings of the EB28 edition have been used for the single seat variant EB29 with slight modifications.

== Specifications (EB28) ==
Data from

General characteristics

- Crew: 2
- Wingspan: 28 m (91 ft 10 in)
- Height: 1.70 m (5 ft 7 in)
- Wing area: 16.8 m^{2} (181 sq ft)
- Aspect ratio: 46.7
- Empty weight: 570 kg (1,257 lb) approximately
- Gross weight: 850 kg (1,874 lb)
- Powerplant: 1 × Solo 2625-02 , 47 kW (63 hp)
- Propellers: Binder Type BM-G1-160-R-120
- Propellers: 1.60 m (5 ft 3 in) diameter

Performance

- Cruise speed: 160 km/h (99 mph, 86 kn) in powered flight
- Never exceed speed: 275 km/h (171 mph, 148 kn)
- Minimum control speed: 78 km/h (48 mph, 42 kn)
- Maximum glide ratio: 65
- Rate of climb: 2.5 m/s (490 ft/min) with engine
