= Hydrogen Electric Racing Federation =

Racing organization for hydrogen fuel cell-powered vehicles

- Category: Hydrogen vehicles
- Jurisdiction: United States
- Abbreviation: HERF
- Founded: 2007
- President: Peter M. DeLorenzo

Hydrogen Electric Racing Federation (HERF) is a racing organization for hydrogen fuel cell-powered vehicles, announced on January 10, 2007. HERF was founded by Peter M. DeLorenzo, who also acts as the league's president and CEO.

Speaking to a gathering of leading auto industry executives from Audi, DaimlerChrysler, Ford, General Motors, Honda, Hyundai, Nissan and Toyota, senior executives from Bridgestone-Firestone and Michelin, as well as such motor sports luminaries as Tony George, the CEO of the Indianapolis Motor Speedway and the Indy Racing League, and Scott Atherton, President and CEO of the American Le Mans Series, DeLorenzo introduced "The Future of Racing" in a speech at The Townsend Hotel in Birmingham, Michigan, calling it the dawn of a new age for automotive propulsion.

As DeLorenzo explained, "The time has come for the automobile industry to embrace the future vigorously – and in no uncertain terms. It is time for the automobile industry to take its advanced research away from the reassuring glare of the computer screen and out of the comfortably sterile environment of the research laboratory, and let innovation and technical creativity run free and unfettered on the racetrack – with the most advanced automotive technology in the world – hydrogen electric fuel cell-powered vehicles. We have formed the Hydrogen Electric Racing Federation for one very important reason – and it goes far beyond the fact that the management of the world's resources has become a global concern and priority – a priority that we of course share. The real heart of the matter is that I believe racing needs a new idea."

== Hydrogen 500 ==
The Hydrogen 500 is a new concept for racing that will introduce an entirely new category of racing machines to the world – machines powered by hydrogen electric fuel cells. The Hydrogen 500 is first and foremost a serious, 500-mile race – one that will challenge the designers and engineers of the world's automobile manufacturers on the following fronts:

- How to creatively package advanced technical components in a compact, maximum-performance racing machine.
- How to address issues of on-board hydrogen fuel storage and delivery – and all aspects of re-fueling.
- How to manage the heat and energy generated by the electronic systems, with a crucial emphasis on overall durability.
- How to achieve high average speeds, while balancing the pursuit of those speeds with the frequency necessary for refueling stops, as well as the durability required to go the entire 500-mile race distance.

Plans called for two oval races in the U.S. in the first year, three races in the U.S. in year two, including two ovals and a natural-terrain road course venue, and five races in the following years, including two ovals and one road course in the U.S., an oval race in Japan and a road course event in Shanghai, China. Three races took place in 2010.

== Specifications ==
The HERF racers will be closed-wheel machines with an on-track footprint similar in dimension to but not exceeding those currently used by sports car prototype racers. Key specifications include:

- Weight: 1984 lb (900 kg) minimum
- Construction: Manufacturers' choice
- Aerodynamic Devices: Allowed (although they cannot touch the track surface)
- Suspension, Steering, Brakes, Controls: Manufacturers' choice
- Power: 400hp (300kW) minimum
- Battery Type: Manufacturers' choice
- On-Board Hydrogen: 17.6 lb (8 kg) compressed gas at 10,000psi (689.6bar)
- Tires: One size package for oval tracks, one size package for road racing circuits
- Fuel: One manufacturer, to specification (from renewable resources)
- Projected Lap Speed (at the Indianapolis Motor Speedway): 185 mph+ (298 km/h+)

== See also ==
- Environmentalism in motorsport
