= Solo 2625 =

- Type: Aircraft engine
- National origin: Germany
- Manufacturer: Solo Vertriebs- und Entwicklungs GmbH

The Solo 2625 is a series of German aircraft engines, designed and produced by Solo Vertriebs- und Entwicklungs GmbH of Sindelfingen for use in ultralight aircraft, self-launching sailplanes and homebuilt aircraft.

== Design and development ==
The engine series are all twin-cylinder two-stroke, in-line, 625 cc (38.1 cu in) displacement, liquid-cooled, gasoline engine designs, with poly V belt reduction drives. They employ dual electronic ignition ignitions systems and produce 53 to 68 hp (40 to 51 kW), depending on the model, with a compression ratio of 9.5:1.

== Variants ==
Solo 2625 01
Model with a single diaphragm carburetor, that produces 53 hp (40 kW) at 5,900 rpm.
Solo 2625 02
Model with dual diaphragm carburetors, that produces 64 hp (48 kW) at 6,500 rpm.
Solo 2625 02i
Model with fuel injection, that produces 68 hp (51 kW) at 6,600 rpm.

== Applications ==
- Binder EB28
- Binder EB29
- Glaser-Dirks DG-500
- Glaser-Dirks DG-800
- HpH 304
- Rolladen-Schneider LS9
- Schempp-Hirth Arcus
- Schempp-Hirth Quintus
- Schempp-Hirth Ventus-2
- Sportinė Aviacija LAK-20

== Specifications (2625 02i) ==
Data from Tacke

=== General characteristics ===
- Type: Twin cylinder, two stroke aircraft engine
- Bore: 76 mm (3.0 in)
- Stroke: 69 mm (2.7 in)
- Displacement: 625 cc (38.1 cu in)
- Dry weight: 24 kg (52.9 lb)

=== Components ===
- Fuel type: gasoline
- Cooling system: liquid
- Reduction gear: poly V belt

=== Performance ===
- Power output: 68 hp (51 kW) at 6600 rpm
- Compression ratio: 9.5

== See also ==
Related lists

- List of aircraft engines
