= Suzuki Crosscage =

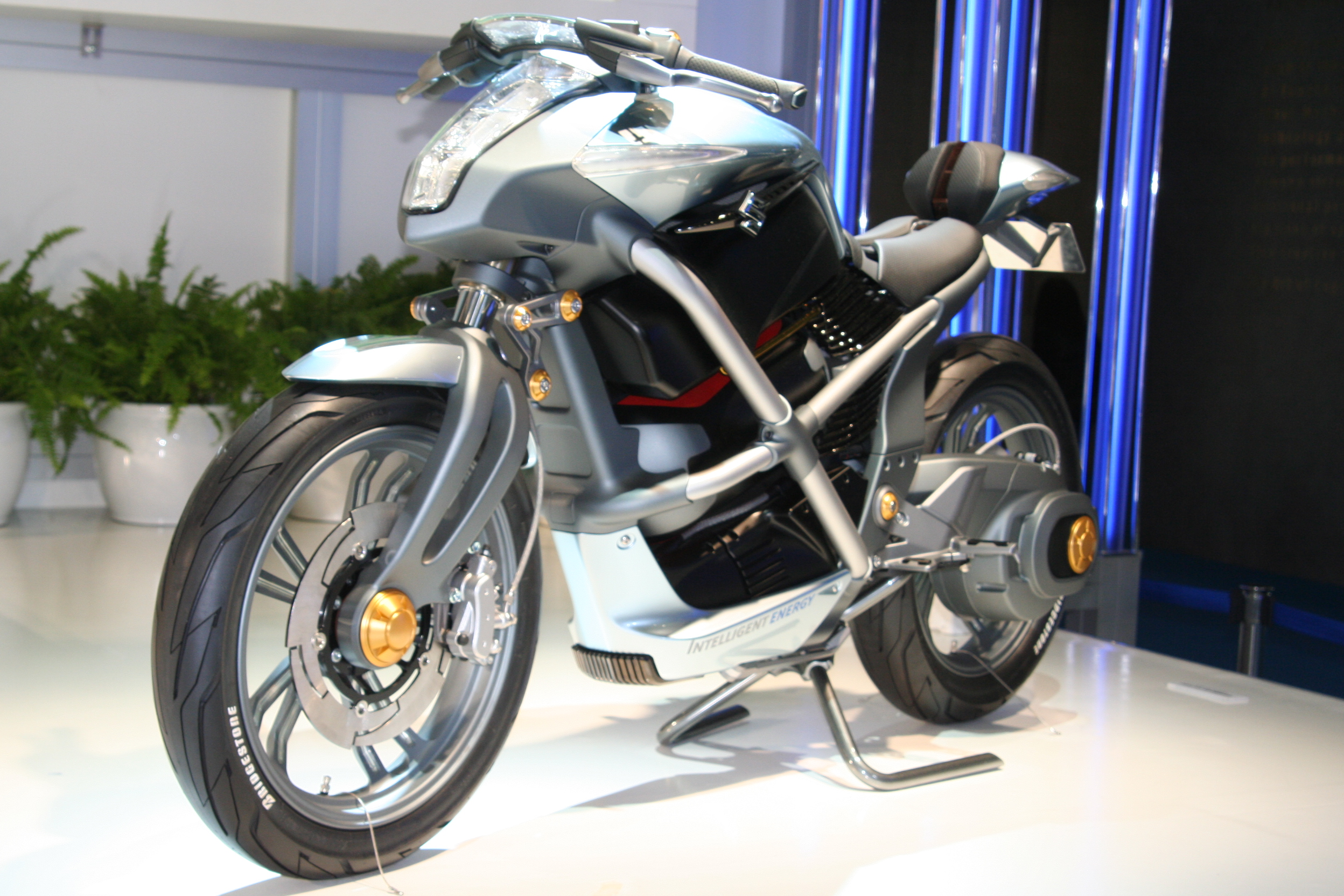
Crosscage

The Suzuki Crosscage is an electric motorcycle with a futuristic look equipped with an AC synchronous electric motor, a power system fuel cell type PEFC (polymer electrolyte) air-cooled, a reservoir for storing 35 MPa high-pressure hydrogen and a lithium-ion battery auxiliary high performance. It has an autonomy of 200 km.

The manufacturer has not yet announced a release schedule.

== See also ==
- Hydrogen ship
- Hydrogen vehicle
- Hydrogen economy
