= Binder EB29 =

Single-seat German motor glider, 2009

EB29

General information
- Type: Open-class self-launched sailplane
- National origin: Germany
- Manufacturer: Binder Motorenbau

History
- First flight: September 2009
- Developed from: Binder EB28 Edition

The Binder EB29 is a German single-seat, open-class self-launching powered sailplane designed and built by Binder Motorenbau. Its wings are based on those of the earlier EB28, while the fuselage is newly designed.

== Variants ==
Originally available with wing extensions to give a 28.3 and 29.3 m span. Since March 2011, shorter 25.3 m wings have also been available.

EB29

Initial single seat version developed from the EB28 edition. Available with 25.3 m, 28.3 m or 29.3 m wingspans.

EB29D

Two-seat variant. Forward fuselage lengthened by 25 cm to accommodate the second seat. Available with 25.3 m or 28.3 m wingspans.

EB29DE

The "EB29DElektro" is an EB29D equipped with an Emrax electric motor. Available with 25.3 m or 28.3 m wingspans.

EB29R

Single seat version with a redesigned 28 m "R-wing" for improved performance.

EB29DR

Two-seat variant incorporating the lengthened fuselage of the EB29D and the 28 m "R-wing" of the EB29R.

== Specifications (29m variant) ==
Data from

General characteristics

- Crew: 1
- Length: 8 m (26 ft 3 in)
- Wingspan: 29.3 m (96 ft 2 in)
- Height: 1.85 m (6 ft 1 in)
- Wing area: 16.8 m^{2} (181 sq ft)
- Aspect ratio: 51
- Empty weight: 570 kg (1,257 lb) approximately
- Gross weight: 850 kg (1,874 lb)
- Powerplant: 1 × Solo 2625 02 , 48 kW (64 hp)
- Propellers: 2-bladed Binder BM-G1-160-R-120-1, 1.60 m (5 ft 3 in) diameter

Performance

- Cruise speed: 160 km/h (99 mph, 86 kn) in powered flight
- Never exceed speed: 280 km/h (170 mph, 150 kn)
- Minimum control speed: 74 km/h (46 mph, 40 kn)
- Maximum glide ratio: 68
- Rate of climb: 2.5 m/s (490 ft/min) with engine
