= Schempp-Hirth Quintus =

German single-seat glider, 2011

Quintus
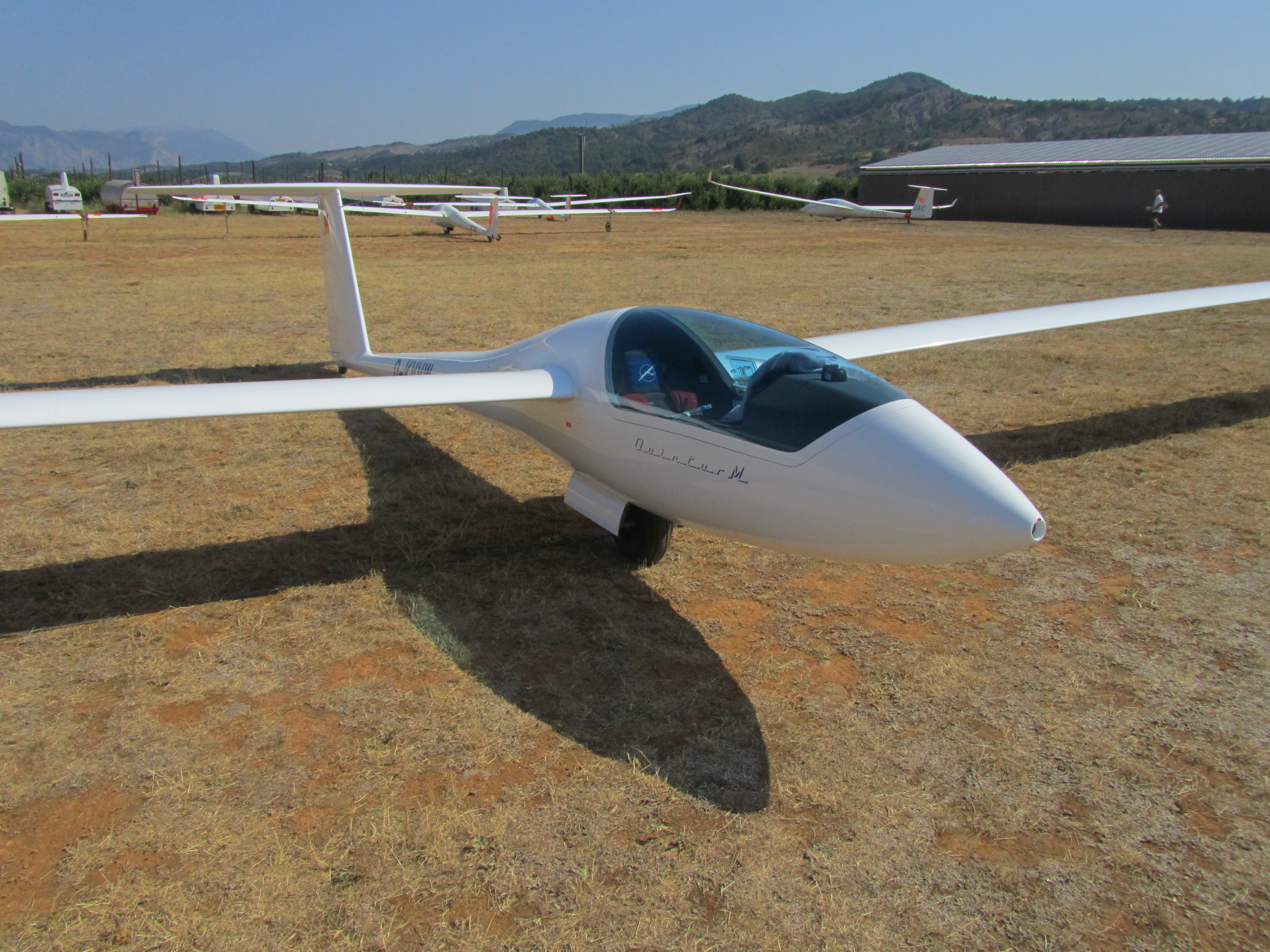

General information
- Type: Open-Class sailplane
- National origin: Germany
- Manufacturer: Schempp-Hirth
- Number built: 15 (as at Feb 2016)

History
- First flight: December 23, 2011

The Schempp-Hirth Quintus is a single-seat 23 metre Open-Class glider built by Schempp-Hirth

== Development ==
The Quintus and the Lange Antares 23E were developed in a joint venture between Lange Aviation GmbH and Schempp-Hirth. The two aircraft share a common wing design and the companies have agreed to coordinate marketing. The 18m inner section of the wing was developed by Lange with the assistance of Professor Loek Boermans of the Delft University of Technology. The outer sections have Maughmer winglets. The wings' moulds have also been used for the Lange Antares H3 experimental fuel-cell aircraft. The biggest differences between Antares 23 E and Quintus are the fuselages and the propulsion units. Lange Aviation have installed an electric system whereas the Quintus has a SOLO 2625-02i combustion engine.

At 58 kg/m^{2} the Quintus has a wing-loading 20% higher than its predecessors and its high aspect ratio will give good climb rates in thermals. It will only be available as a self-launcher with a steerable tailwheel.

== Major competition results ==
- 1st place at 2012 World Gliding Championships (Open Class) in Uvalde, Texas

== Specifications ==
Quintus being flown by Gerrit Kurstjens at Sisteron

General characteristics

- Crew: One
- Capacity: 250 kg water ballast
- Length: 7.83 m (25 ft 6 in)
- Wingspan: 23.00 m (75 ft 5 in)
- Wing area: 14.7 m^{2} (158 sq ft)
- Aspect ratio: 36
- Airfoil: Delft DU 97-127/15
- Empty weight: 500 kg (1,102 lb)
- Gross weight: 850 kg (1,873 lb)
- Powerplant: 1 × Solo 2625-02i , 52.2 kW (70 hp)

Performance

- Maximum glide ratio: 60:1

== See also ==
Aircraft of comparable role, configuration, and era

- Jonker JS-1 Revelation (21m version)
- Lange Antares 23E
- Schleicher ASH 31

Related lists

- List of gliders
