= Sportinė Aviacija LAK-20 =

Lithuanian Open Class sailplane

LAK-20

General information
- Type: Open Class sailplane
- National origin: Lithuania
- Manufacturer: AB Sportinė Aviacija

The LAK-20 is a Lithuanian Open Class two-seat sailplane produced by Sportinė Aviacija.

== Design and development ==
The LAK-20 is an Open Class two-seat sailplane with a wingspan of 23-metres or 26-metres. Made out of modern composite materials, it features a T-tail and retractable landing gear. The wings are slightly swept forward and interchangeable outer wing panels are provided to enable it to fly with a wingspan of either 23 metres or 26 metres. The glider is available as the self-sustaining LAK-20T variant or the self-launching LAK-20M variant, both equipped with an engine. The engines used are two-stroke two-cylinder retractable engines from engine manufacturer SOLO.

== Variants ==
LAK-20T
Production variant, self-sustaining sailplane with a 22 kW (30 hp) two-stroke two-cylinder air-cooled Solo 2350C retractable engine.
LAK-20M
Production variant, self-launching sailplane with a 47 kW (64 hp) two-stroke two-cylinder liquid-cooled Solo 2625 02 retractable engine.

== Specifications (LAK-20T 26-metre) ==
Data from

General characteristics

- Crew: two
- Length: 8.65 m (28 ft 4.5 in)
- Wingspan: 26 m (85 ft 4 in)
- Height: 1.011 m (3 ft 4 in)
- Wing area: 16.4 m^{2} (176.5 sq ft)
- Aspect ratio: 41.25
- Empty weight: 485 kg (1,069 lb)
- Gross weight: 850 kg (1,873 lb)
- Powerplant: 1 × Solo 2350C , 22 kW (30 hp)

Performance

- Maximum speed: 275 km/h (171 mph, 149 kn)
- Maximum glide ratio: 60
