= PHB (bicycle) =

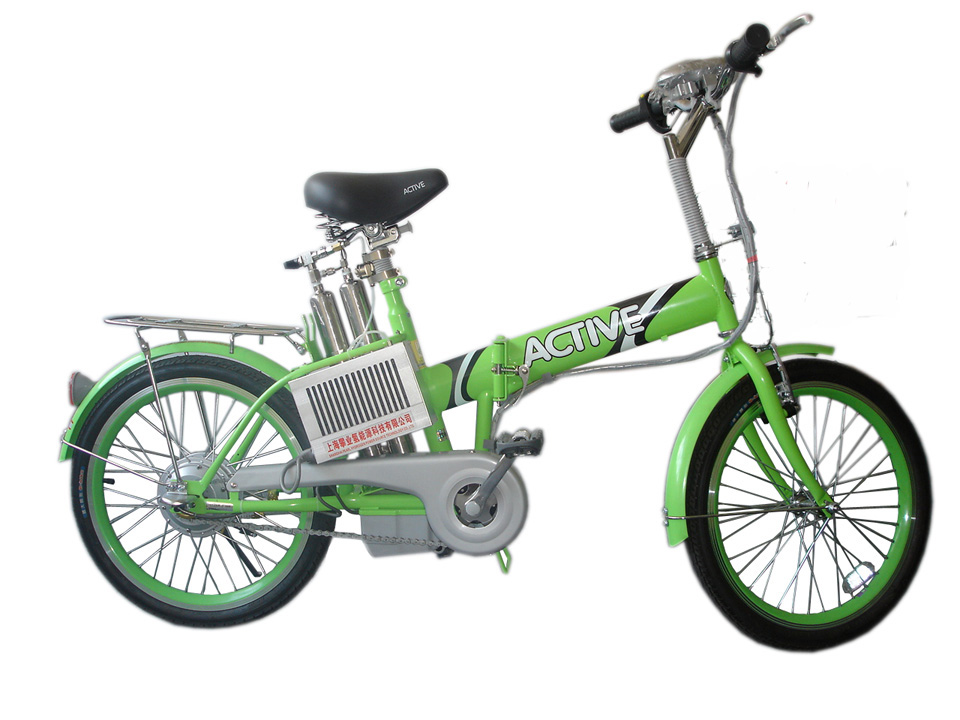
PHB bicycle

The PHB was a bicycle, power-assisted by an electric motor that gets its power from a hydrogen fuel cell. It was manufactured by Pearl (SPHPST.Co). A concept version was unveiled at the 9th China International Exhibition on Gas Technology, Equipment and Applications in 2007. The vehicle weighed approximately 32 kilograms and used a proton-exchange membrane fuel cell to generate about 200 Watts.

It was able to reach approximately 25 km/h, and the company stated that, on a full tank, it could be ridden a distance of 60 to 100 kilometres. The motor was a brushless motor. The bike was announced in 2007 to sell for approximately US$2500, but no hydrogen supply network was available.

== See also ==
- Hydrogen vehicle
- Electric bicycle
