= Lange Antares =

German single-seat motor glider, 2003

Antares
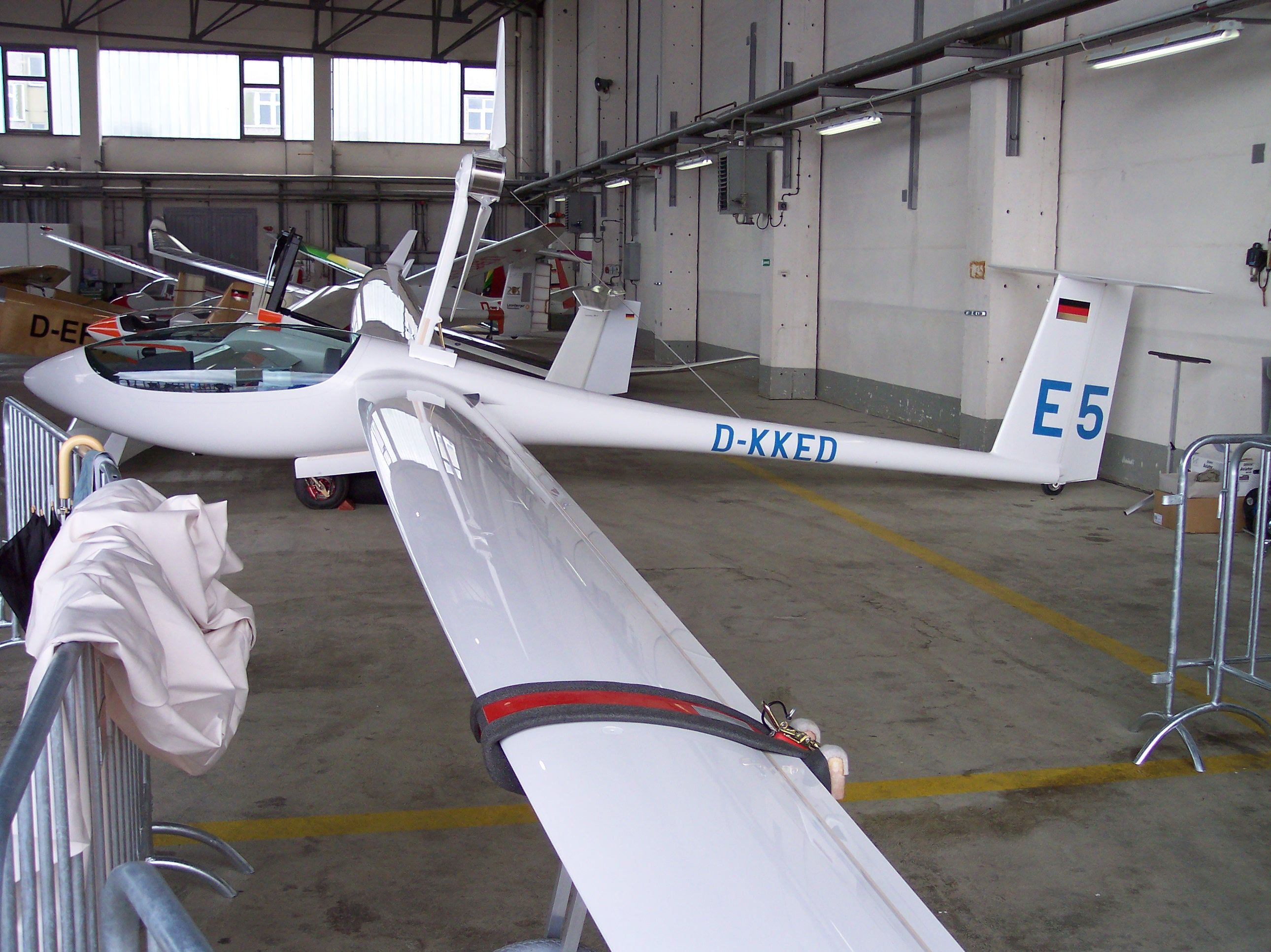
- Lange Aviation Antares 20E

General information
- Type: Open Class and 18 m Class sailplane
- National origin: Germany
- Manufacturer: Lange Aviation GmbH
- Number built: 50 as of April 2009

History
- First flight: 2003

The Lange Antares is a glider built by Lange Aviation produced with three different wingspans, 18, 20 and 23 meters. The 20 and 23 meter variants can be equipped with a 42-kW electric motor and SAFT VL 41M lithium-ion batteries.

The EM 42 is a fixed-shaft brushless DC electric motor running at 190-288 V, and drawing up to 160 A, the 42 kW motor can deliver up to 216 N.m of torque over a speed range of 160-1600 RPM with a total efficiency of 90%. Maximum continuous power is 38.5 kW, the motor weighs 29 kg, and the weight of power electronics is 10 kg. The motor turns a two-blade fixed-pitch propeller, LF-P42, constructed of composite materials, having a diameter of two meters.

The battery system consists of two battery packs positioned in the leading edges of both inner wings (72 cells divided into 24 modules containing 3 cells each). The battery life is expected to be 3000 cycles or 20 years. The capacity of the battery is 41 Ah (specific energy 136 Wh/kg and specific peak power 794 W/kg). The batteries can deliver 13 minutes at maximum power and maximum climb speed, and can climb 3,000 meters on one battery charge; in reality, in warm climates, motor and electronics temperature limitations can limit the achievable climb height. The charger is integrated inside the fuselage so when landing elsewhere the pilot merely has to find a (16A) electric outlet socket. The glider has a modem connected to its main computer so that Lange technicians can, in theory, run diagnostics remotely. The same modem allows the pilot remote control & monitoring of the battery charging process.

The undercarriage and engine doors are electro-hydraulically operated. The tailwheel is steerable. The wing has an elliptical planform, with winglets and wing-tip wheels. The glide polar shows excellent high speed performance.

== Variants ==
- Antares 18S - 18 meter wingspan pure glider.
- Antares 18T - 18 meter wingspan glider with Solo 2350 two-stroke gasoline sustainer engine.
- Antares 20E - 20 meter wingspan with 42 kW electric self-launch capable engine.
- Antares 23E - 23 meter wingspan with 42 kW electric self-launch capable engine.

== Specifications ==
=== Antares 20E ===
General characteristics

- Crew: one pilot
- Capacity: 100 L water ballast
- Length: 7.40 m (24 ft 3 in)
- Wingspan: 20.00 m (65 ft 7 in)
- Height: 1.64 m (5 ft 5 in)
- Wing area: 12.6 m^{2} (135.6 sq ft)
- Aspect ratio: 31.7
- Empty weight: 460 kg (1,014 lb)
- Gross weight: 660 kg (1,455 lb)
- Powerplant: 1 × Lange EM 42 , 42 kW (57 hp)

Performance

- Maximum speed: 280 km/h (174 mph, 151 kn)
- Maximum glide ratio: 56
- Rate of climb: 4.4 m/s (866 ft/min)
- Rate of sink: 0.49 m/s (96 ft/min)

=== Antares 23E ===
General characteristics

- Crew: one pilot
- Capacity: 250 L water ballast
- Length: 7.48 m (24 ft 6.5 in)
- Wingspan: 23.00 m (75 ft 5.5 in)
- Height: 1.89 m (6 ft 2 in)
- Wing area: 14.75 m^{2} (158.76 sq ft)
- Aspect ratio: 38.26
- Empty weight: 510 kg (1,124 lb)
- Gross weight: 850 kg (1,873 lb)
- Powerplant: 1 × Lange EM 42 , 42 kW (57 hp)

Performance

- Maximum speed: 280 km/h (174 mph, 151 kn)
- Maximum glide ratio: 60
- Rate of climb: 4.0 m/s (787 ft/min)
- Rate of sink: 0.48 m/s (94.5 ft/min)

== See also ==
Related development

- Schempp-Hirth Quintus
