= Lange Aviation =

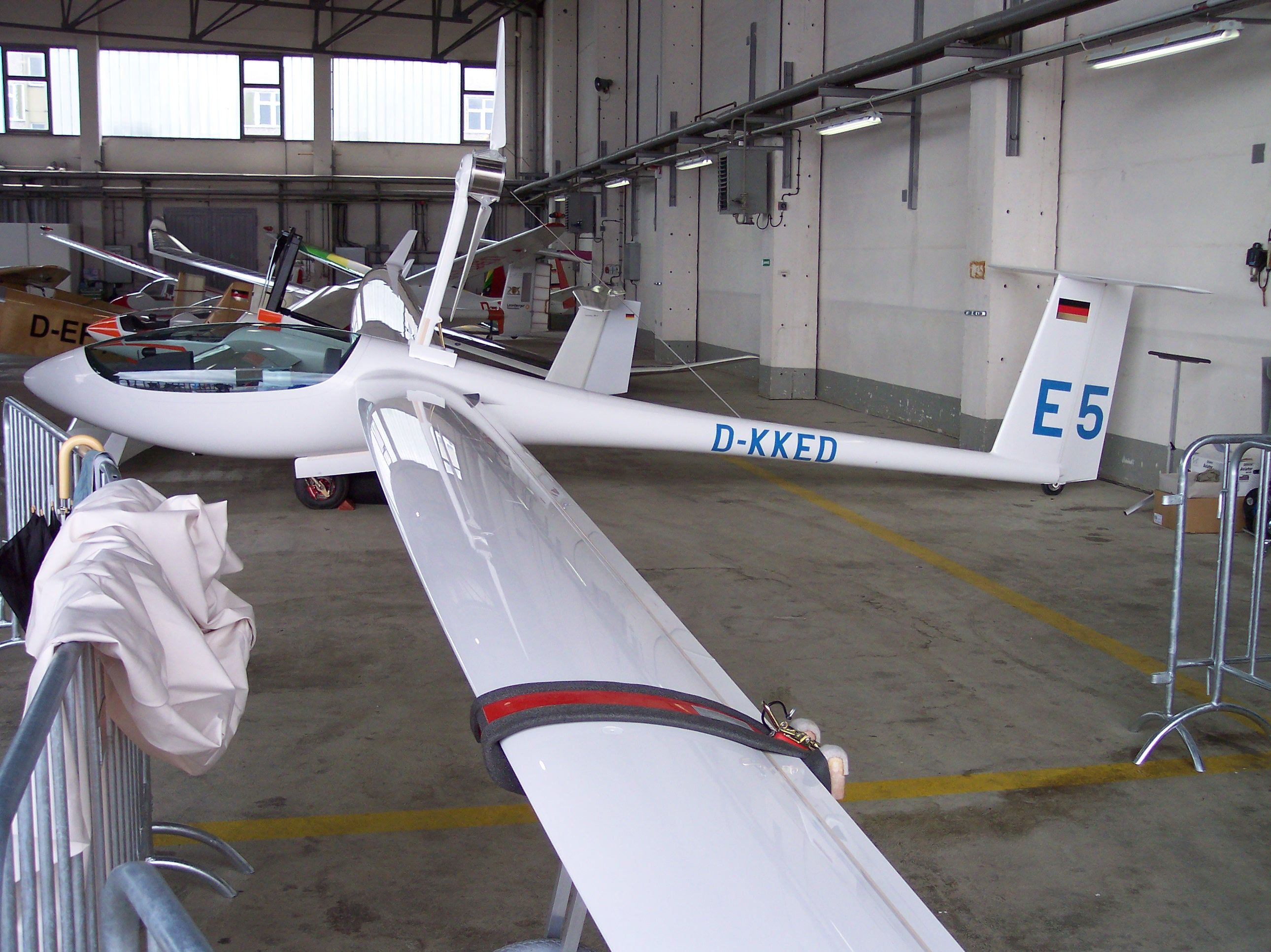
Lange Antares 20E

Lange Aviation GmbH is a German company that manufactures gliders and develops electric power-plants for other aircraft. It was founded by its present managing director, Axel Lange, in 1996 as Lange Flugzeugbau GmbH in Zweibrücken. The company currently has 42 employees. At the end of September 2007, the business was re-capitalised. Lange Faserverbundtechnik GmbH acquired all material and intellectual properties of the Lange Flugzeugbau GmbH and it continued the production of the Antares gliders at the airport at Zweibrücken. The company has operated since 2008 under the name Lange Aviation GmbH.

== Gliders ==
The company builds and sells an electric self-launching glider, the Lange Antares 20E. It uses lithium-ion batteries and a 42 kW brushless DC electric motor. This unit was first flight tested on 7 May 1999, in a heavily modified DG-800 B. The prototype Antares 20E flew in 2003, the first production aircraft was delivered in 2004. The 20E's electric system was also available in the Schempp-Hirth Arcus until 2016.

The Antares 18 is an 18m class glider that has been derived from the 20E. It first flew 28 May 2006. The Antares 18 is available as a pure glider (18S) or with a two stroke engine (18T).

The company announced a 23-metre Open Class glider on 23 April 2011, called Antares 23E. This has been developed in a joint venture with Schempp-Hirth which simultaneously announced another 23m glider called the Schempp-Hirth Quintus. The two companies have agreed to coordinate marketing. The biggest differences between Antares 23 E and Quintus are the fuselages and the propulsion units. Lange Aviation have installed an electric system whereas the Quintus has a combustion engine.

== Fuel cell experimental aircraft ==
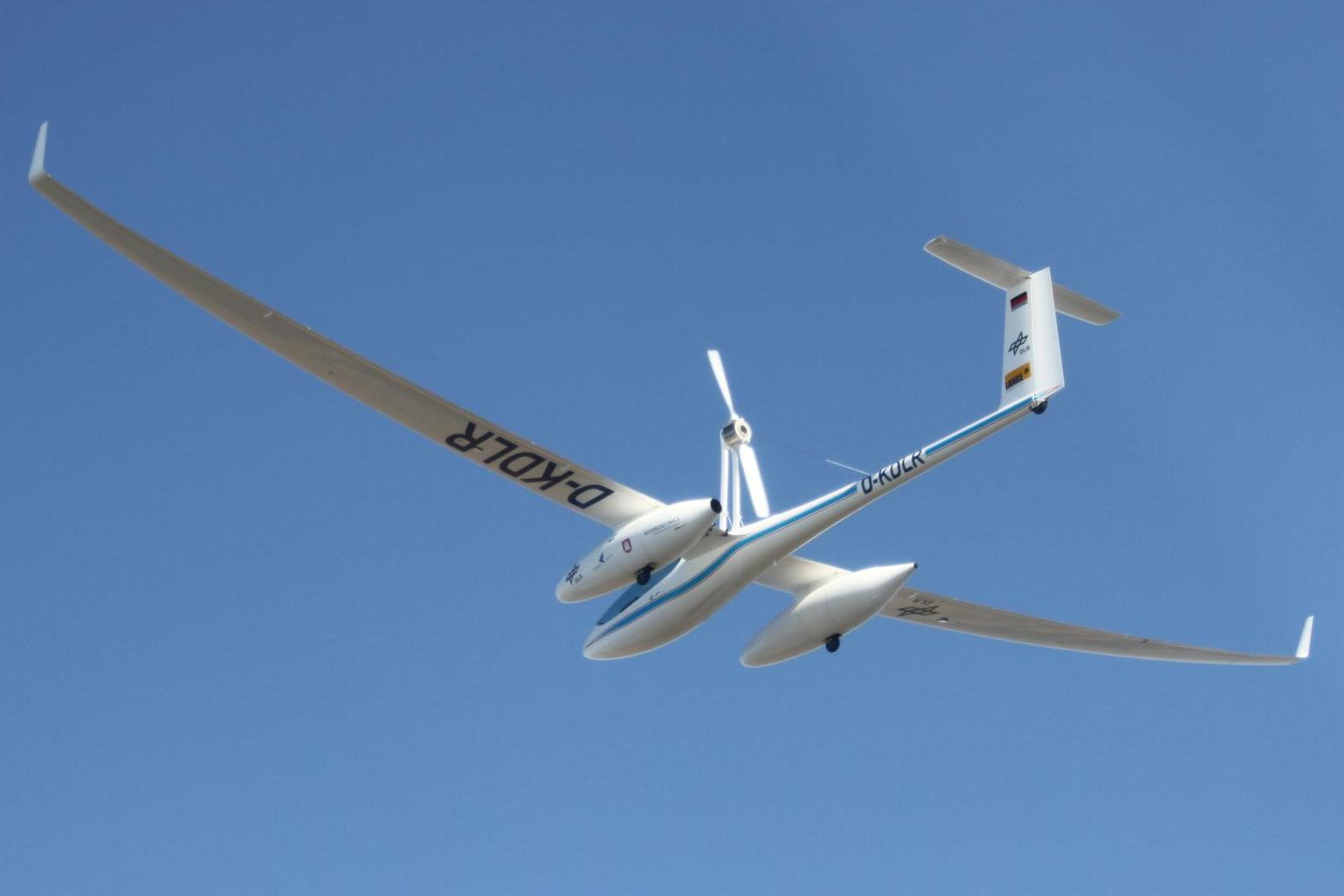
The Antares DLR-H2 in flight

The company produced a flying test bed for fuel cell technology in collaboration with German Aerospace Center (DLR). The aircraft, "Antares DLR-H2", was based on the 20E but has strengthened wings with hard-points. Attached to the hard-points are two 2.8m long pods, the right hand pod containing a tank with pressurized hydrogen, the left hand pod containing the fuel-cells. The aircraft still carries the full pack of Li-Ion batteries, and can be flown on fuel-cell power alone, on battery power alone and in hybrid mode. This makes testing of new fuel cell systems much easier. The aircraft was announced in September 2008 at Stuttgart Airport. The first flight on fuel-cell power alone took place in April 2009. The first public demonstration flight took place in July 2009 in Hamburg.

The company is developing the next experimental aircraft called the Antares H3, again with the German Aerospace Center (DLR). The Antares H3 is a higher performance successor to the Antares DLR-H2 and the first flight is due to take place in 2011. Like the H2 it is based on the Antares 20E and it also uses hydrogen fuel cells.

The 40 hour endurance Lange Antares E2 surveillance aircraft was to be unveiled at AERO Friedrichshafen on April 18–21, 2018 before a first flight in June. The 1,650-kg (3,640-lb.) E2 has six 6.7 kW (9.0 hp) reformed methanol fuel cells, supplemented by 12 kWh (43 MJ) Li-ion batteries, powering six 15 kW (20 hp) electric motors and can maintain horizontal flight on two motors and three fuel cells. The 23-m-span (75.6-ft.) wing has two pods for the fuel cell, 300 kg (660 lb) of fuel in outboard pods, and 1.06 m (3 ft 6 in) propellers on struts above the trailing edge to avoid interference drag. It can carry 200 kg (440 lb) of payload in the fuselage bays and the outboard wing pods. Applications are civilian like maritime surveillance with a radar, an electro-optical/infrared sensor and a satellite-communications antenna.
