= Bivalent =

Bivalent may refer to:

- Bivalent (chemistry), a molecule formed from two or more atoms bound together
- Bivalent ligand, a ligand of two drug-like molecules
- Bivalent (genetics), a pair of homologous chromosomes
- Bivalent vaccine, a vaccine directed at two pathogens or two strains of a pathogen
- Bivalent (engine), an engine that can operate on two different types of fuel
- A verb with a valency of two
- Principle of bivalence, a semantic principle in logic

== See also ==
- Valence (disambiguation)
- Bivalve (disambiguation)
