= Snowspeed =

Snowspeed prototype III in testing at Toyota Motorsport GmbH in Cologne, Germany

Snowspeed is a gravity powered snow sledge that has been designed to beat the world speed record.

Its design deliberately resembles Formula 1 racing cars because this will help it achieve speeds of up to 250 km/h (155 mph).

The current speed record is held by Guy Martin, who achieved 134.36 km/h (83.49 mph) in 2014.

The sledge has been created by a team of Norwegian speed enthusiasts, led by designer Nima Shahinian, journalist Jorn Madslien and entrepreneur Tom Ruud.

Tests have been carried out at [Toyota Motorsport GmbH] - TMG, the current second-best endurance motor racing team in the world.

Early tests revealed that the Snowspeed prototype III design needed a bit more rear-end stability, and those adjustments are the team's focus during 2016, before an attempt on the record is due to be made towards the end of winter 2017.
