= Madslien =

Madslien is a surname. Notable people with the surname include:

- Jorn Madslien (born 1967), British journalist
- Valborg Madslien (born 1973), Norwegian ski-orienteer
