= BMW Hydrogen 7 =

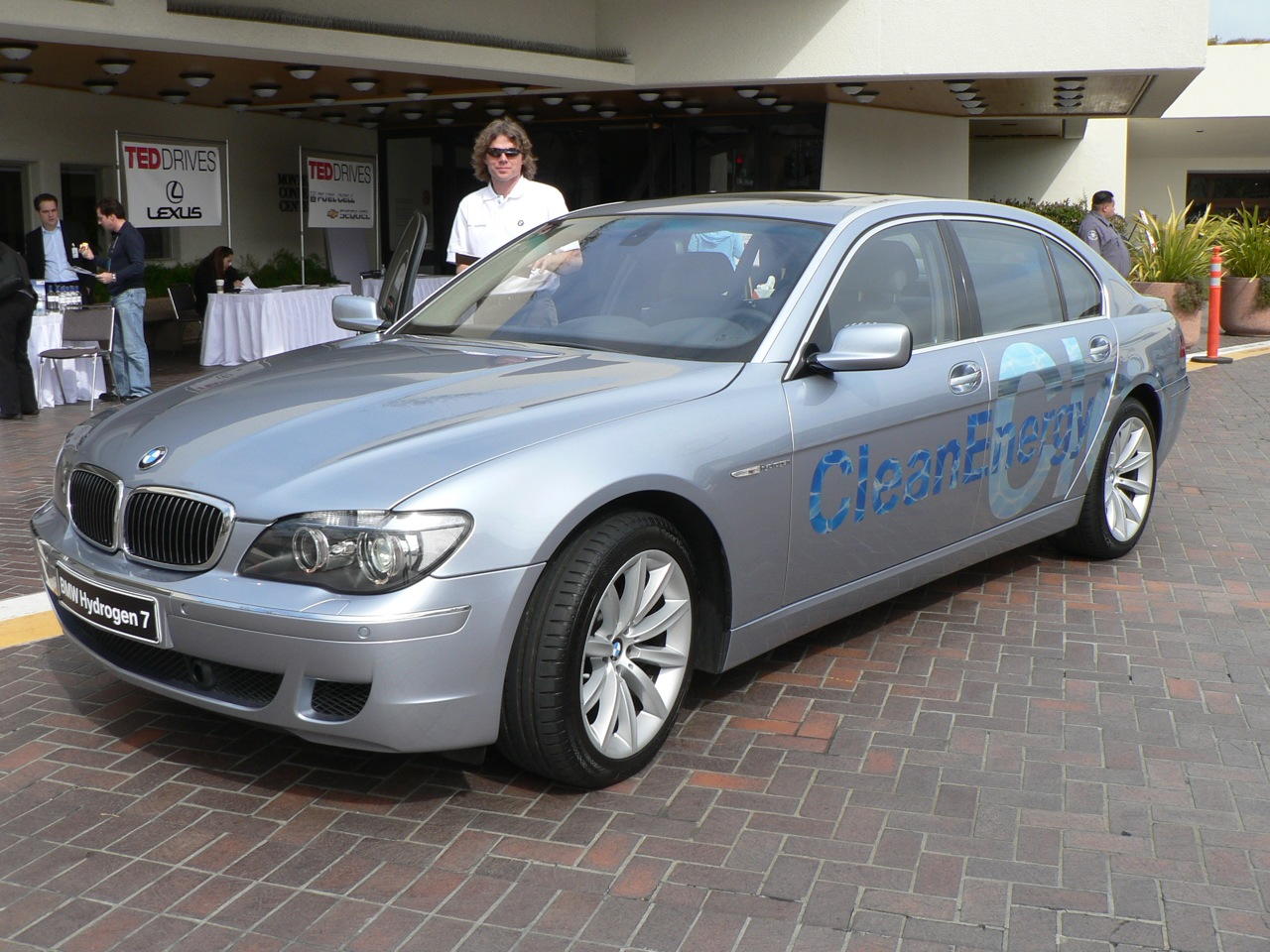

Overview
- Manufacturer: BMW
- Production: 2005–2007

Body and chassis
- Class: Luxury car
- Related: BMW 7 Series

Powertrain
- Engine: Internal combustion engine

The BMW Hydrogen 7 is a limited production hydrogen internal combustion engine vehicle built from 2005 to 2007 by German automobile manufacturer BMW. The car is based on BMW's traditional petrol-powered BMW 7 Series (E65) line of vehicles, and more specifically the 760Li. It uses the same 6-litre V-12 motor as does the 760i and 760Li; however, it has been modified to also allow for the combustion of hydrogen as well as petrol, making it a bivalent engine.

== Production ==
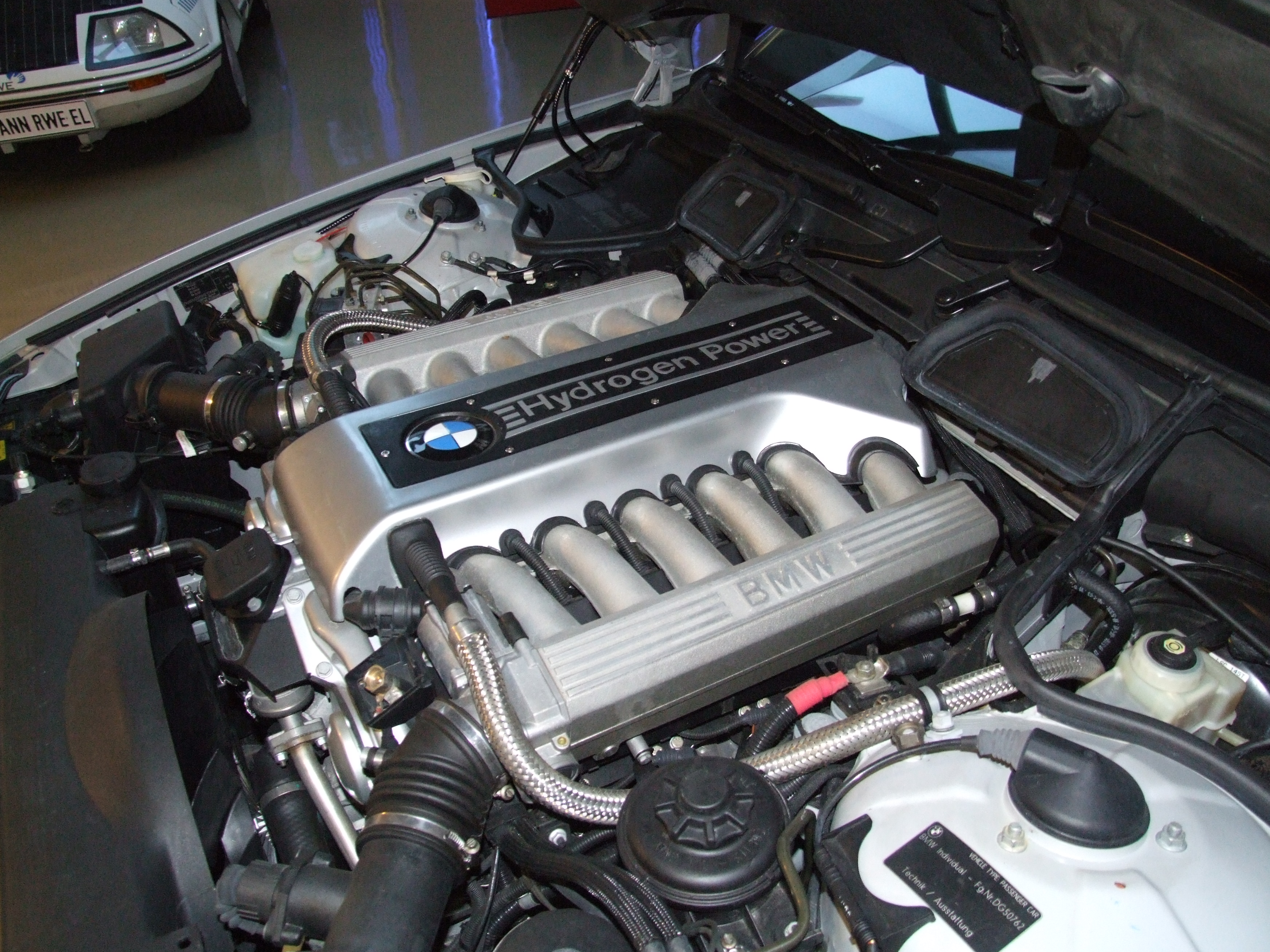
12-cylinder hydrogen engine of BMW Hydrogen 7

Only 100 total vehicles were produced to put their technology to the test. BMW said it chose public figures such as politicians, media figures, businessmen and big names in the entertainment industry such as 2007 Academy Award-winning director Florian Henckel von Donnersmarck and the chairman of Sixt AG, Erich Sixt, because “they would be ideal ambassadors” for hydrogen fuel and could help spread awareness of the need for such technologies.

== Use of hydrogen technology ==
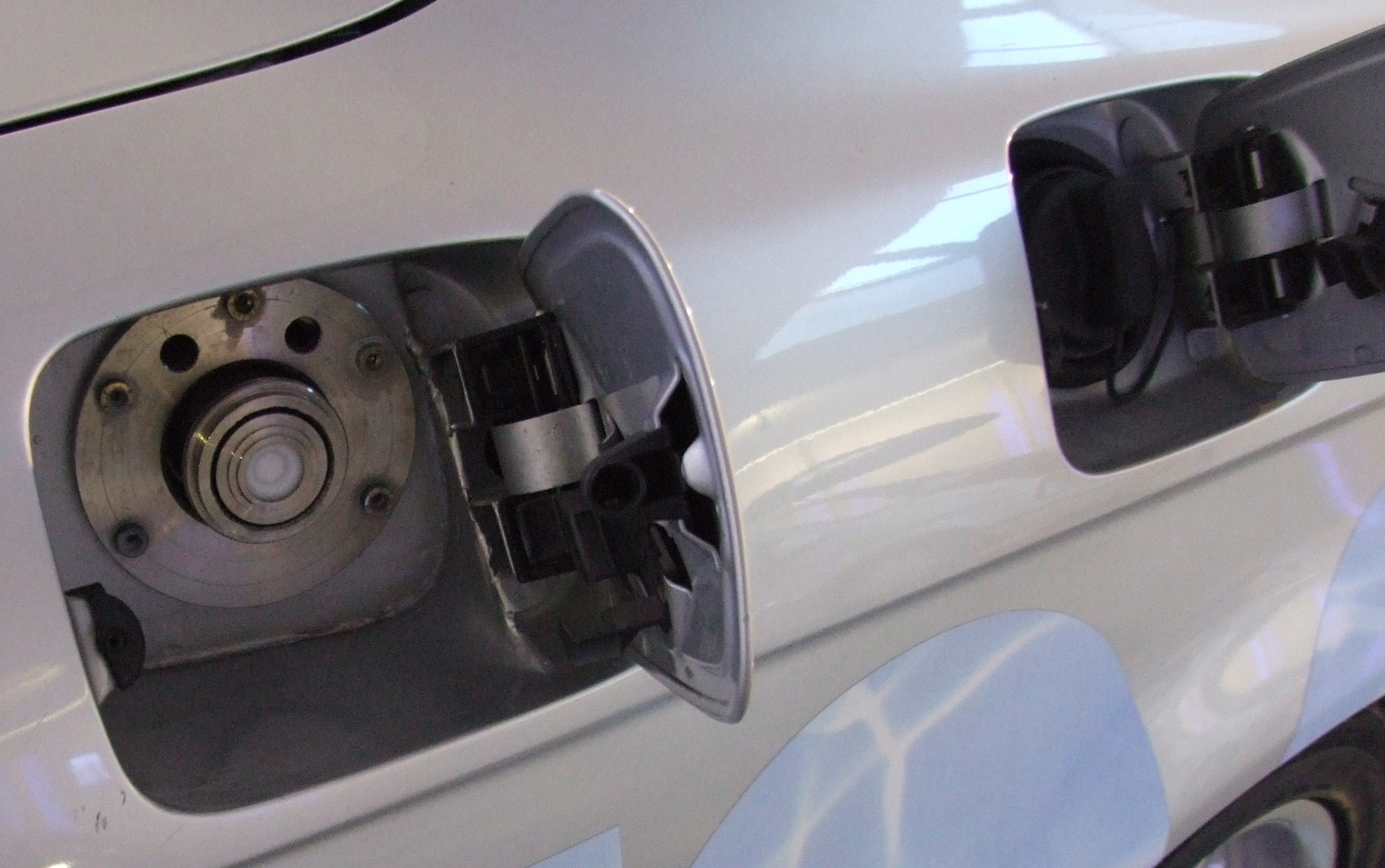
Left: filler neck of a BMW for hydrogen, right filler neck for gasoline, Museum Autovision, Altlußheim, Germany

The BMW Hydrogen 7 burns hydrogen in an internal combustion engine (ICE). When in hydrogen mode, high-pressure injectors, designed by HOERBIGER ValveTec GmbH, directly inject hydrogen gas into the cylinder combustion chamber with pressures of up to 300 bars (4,400 psi). The combustion technique is a combination of spark-ignition and diesel combustion systems using surface ignition, subsequently followed by a diffusion type of combustion. This combustion system matches the efficiency values of the currently best turbodiesel engines at a maximum of 42 percent. The car can also switch seamlessly between hydrogen and gasoline at the touch of a button on the steering wheel, and will do so automatically when one of the fuels is depleted.

The hydrogen fuel is stored in a large, nearly 170-litre (45-US-gallon), bi-layered and highly insulated tank that stores the fuel as liquid rather than as compressed gas, which BMW says offers 75% more energy per volume as a liquid than compressed gas at 700 bars of pressure. The hydrogen tank's insulation is under high vacuum in order to keep heat transfer to the hydrogen to a bare minimum, and is purportedly equivalent to a 17-metre (56 ft) thick wall of polystyrene Styrofoam.

To stay a liquid, hydrogen must be cooled and maintained at cryogenic temperatures of, at warmest, −253 °C (20.1 K; −423.4 °F). When not using fuel, the Hydrogen 7's hydrogen tank starts to warm and the hydrogen starts to vaporize. Once the tank's internal pressure reaches 87 psi, at roughly 17 hours of non-use, the tank will safely vent the building pressure. Over 10–12 days, it will completely lose the contents of the tank because of this.

There have been some accusations of greenwashing in reference to their BMW Hydrogen 7. Some critics claim that the emissions produced during hydrogen fuel production outweigh the reduction of tailpipe emissions, and that the Hydrogen 7 is a distraction from more immediate, practical solutions for car pollution. The BBC's Jorn Madslien questioned whether the Hydrogen 7 was "a truly green initiative or merely a cynical marketing ploy".

== Specifications ==
The car is powered by a 6.0 litre V12 engine capable of running on both premium gasoline and hydrogen fuel. It is rated at 191-kilowatt (260 PS; 256 hp) and 390 N⋅m (290 lb⋅ft) of torque using either fuel. The car accelerates from stopped to 100 km/h (62 mph) in 9.5 seconds. The hydrogen fuel tank holds roughly 8 kg (18 lb) of hydrogen, enough to travel 201 kilometres (125 mi). The gasoline fuel tank holds 73.8 litres equal to 55 kg (121 lb), enough to travel 480 kilometres (300 mi) for a combined total of over 640 kilometres (400 mi) at cruising speeds. The Hydrogen 7 gets about 50 L/100 km (5.6 mpg_{‑imp}; 4.7 mpg_{‑US}) on hydrogen. In comparison, Honda's FCX Clarity gets about 15 L/100 km (19 mpg_{‑imp}; 16 mpg_{‑US}) liquid hydrogen equivalent mileage. The curb weight of the Hydrogen 7 is roughly 250 kilograms (550 lb) heavier than the 760Li, bringing it to about 2,300 kilograms (5,100 lb).

== See also ==
- Bivalent (engine)
- List of hydrogen internal combustion engine vehicles
