= Energy efficiency in transport =

Discussing what form of transport is the most fuel efficient and economical

The energy efficiency in transport is the useful travelled distance, of passengers, goods or any type of load; divided by the total energy put into the transport propulsion means. The energy input might be rendered in several different types depending on the type of propulsion, and normally such energy is presented in liquid fuels, electrical energy or food energy. The inverse of the energy efficiency in transport is the energy consumption in transport.

Energy consumption in transport is often described in terms of fuel consumption, fuel consumption being the reciprocal of fuel economy. and linked with a means of propulsion which uses chemical energy, whilst energy efficiency in general is applicable to any sort of propulsion. In order to compare the energy efficiency in any type of vehicle, it helps to use the International System of Units including joules for energy and metres for distance. The more efficient the vehicle, the more metres it covers with one joule (more efficiency), or the fewer joules it uses to travel over one metre (less consumption). The efficient use of energy in transport largely varies by means of transport. Different types of transport consume from some dozen kilojoules per kilometre (kJ/km) for a bicycle to several thousand for a car. Several distinctions are often not clear:

- The energy content of liquid fuels is well known, but not always exactly which fuel is used or whether its value was converted or not.
- The energy content of food varies greatly so that for walking and vehicles using human power its value of metabolic energy is used. If the food for the basal metabolic rate, i.e. the energy needed for living, is included, as it most often is, the efficiency is much lower than if it is excluded, as for the drivers of motor vehicles.
- The energy content of electricity itself is an exact definition, but it undergoes many conversions e.g. from a power station to the vehicle, so that comparisons require defining where the electricity is measured and/or how it is produced.

Via type of fuel used and rate of fuel consumption, energy efficiency is also often related to operating cost ($/km) and environmental emissions (e.g. CO_{2}e/km). The same considerations are beginning to be used also for type of food.

== Units of measurement ==
In the International System of Units, the energy efficiency in transport is measured in terms of metre per joule, or m/J. Nonetheless, several conversions are applicable, depending on the unit of distance and on the unit of energy. For liquid fuels, normally the quantity of energy input is measured in terms of the liquid's volume, such as litres or gallons. For propulsion which runs on electricity, normally kWh is used, while for any type of human-propelled vehicle, the energy input is measured in terms of Calories. It is typical to convert between different types of energy and units.

For passenger transport, the energy efficiency is normally measured in terms of passengers times distance per unit of energy, in the SI, passengers metres per joule (pax.m/J); while for cargo transport the energy efficiency is normally measured in terms of the mass of transported cargo times distance per unit of energy, in the SI, kilograms metres per joule (kg.m/J). Volumetric efficiency with respect to vehicle capacity may also be reported, such as passenger-mile per gallon (PMPG), obtained by multiplying the miles per gallon of fuel by either the passenger capacity or the average occupancy. The occupancy of personal vehicles is typically lower than capacity by a considerable degree and thus the values computed based on capacity and on occupancy will often be quite different.

=== Typical conversions into SI unit ===
	Joules
litre of diesel	0.358 × 10^{8}
litre of petrol	0.3 × 10^{8}
US gallon of petrol (gasoline)	1.3 × 10^{8}
Imp. gallon of petrol (gasoline)	1.6 × 10^{8}
kilocalorie	4.2 × 10^{3}
kWh	3.6 × 10^{6}
BTU	1.1 × 10^{3}

=== Liquid fuels ===
Energy efficiency is expressed in terms of fuel economy:

- distance per vehicle per unit fuel volume; e.g., km/L or miles per gallon (US or imperial).
- distance per vehicle per unit fuel mass; e.g., km/kg.
- distance per vehicle per unit energy; e.g., miles per gallon equivalent (mpg-e).

Energy consumption (reciprocal efficiency) is expressed terms of fuel consumption:

- volume of fuel (or total energy) consumed per unit distance per vehicle; e.g. l/100 km or MJ/100 km.
- volume of fuel (or total energy) consumed per unit distance per passenger; e.g., l/(100 passenger·km).
- volume of fuel (or total energy) consumed per unit distance per unit mass of cargo transported; e.g., l/100 kg·km or MJ/t·km.

=== Electricity ===
Electricity consumption:

- electrical energy used per vehicle per unit distance; e.g., kWh/100 km.

Producing electricity from fuel requires much more primary energy than the amount of electricity produced.

=== Food energy ===
Energy consumption:

- Calories processed by the body's metabolism per kilometre; e.g., Cal/km or kcal/km.
- Calories processed by the body's metabolism per mile; e.g., Cal/miles.

== Land Passenger Transport ==
=== Table Overview ===
In the following table the energy efficiency and energy consumption for different types of passenger land vehicles and modes of transport, as well as standard occupancy rates, are presented, with the sources for these figures in references.

For the conversion amongst units of energy, 1 litre of petrol amounts to 34.2 MJ, 1 kWh to 3.6 MJ and 1 kilocalorie to 4184 J. For the car occupation ratio, the value of 1.2 passengers per automobile is considered. In Europe this value slightly increases to 1.4.

Energy Efficiency and Consumption of Land Passenger Transport means
Mode of transport	Energy Efficiency					Energy consumption					Average number of passengers per vehicle	Energy Efficiency	Energy consumption
Mode of transport	mpg(US) of petrol	mpg(imp) of petrol	km/L of petrol	km/MJ	m/J	L(petrol)/ 100 km	kWh/100 km	kcal/km	MJ/100 km	J/m	Average number of passengers per vehicle	(m·pax)/J	J/(m·pax)
Human propelled
Walking				4.55	0.00455		6.1	52.5	22.0	220	1.0	0.00455	220
Walking				24.2	0.0242		1.148	9.88	4.13	41.3	1.0	0.0242	41.3
Velomobile with enclosed recumbent				12.35	0.01235		2.25 (0.50)	19.35	8.1	81	1.0	0.01235	81
Bicycle				8.85	0.00885		3.14	27	11.3	113	1.0	0.00885	113
Bicycle				20	0.020		1.4	12	5.0	50	1.0	0.020	50
Motor assist
Electric bicycle				23.21	0.02321		1.2	10.33	4.3	43	1.0	0.02321	43
Electric kick scooter				24.87	0.02487		1.12	9.61	4.00	40	1.0	0.02487	40
Automobile
Solar Car				14.93	0.01493		1.86	16.01	6.70	67	1.0	0.01493	67
GEM NER				2.65	0.00265		10.50	90.34	37.80	378	1.2	0.00317	315
General Motors EV1				1.21	0.00121		23.00	197.90	82.80	828	1.2	0.00145	690
Chevrolet Volt	99.31	119.27	42.22	1.23	0.00123	2.37	22.50	193.59	81.00	810	1.2	0.00148	675
Daihatsu Charade	83.80	100.63	35.63	1.04	0.00104	2.81	26.67	229.45	96.00	960	1.2	0.00125	800
Volkswagen Polo	61.88	74.31	26.31	0.77	0.00077	3.80	38	326.97	136.8	1368	1.2	0.00087	1140
SEAT Ibiza 1.4 TDI Ecomotion	61.88	74.31	26.31	0.77	0.00077	3.80	38	326.97	136.8	1368	1.2	0.00087	1140
Renault Clio	33.60	40.32	13.91	0.42	0.00042	7	66.5	572.18	239.4	2394	1.2	0.00049	1995
Volkswagen Passat	26.76	32.11	11.37	0.33	0.00033	8.79	83.51	718.53	300.63	3006	1.2	0.00039	2505
Cadillac CTS-V	13.82	16.60	5.88	0.17	0.00017	17.02	161.67	1391.01	582.00	5820	1.2	0.00021	4850
Bugatti Veyron	9.79	11.75	4.16	0.12	0.00012	24.04	228.33	1964.63	822.00	8220	1.2	0.00015	6850
Nissan Leaf				1.49	0.00149		18.64	160.37	67.10	671	1.2	0.00179	559
Toyota Prius	56.06	67.32	23.83	0.70	0.00070	4.20	39.86	342.97	143.50	1435	1.2	0.00084	1196
Tesla Model S				1.61	0.00161		17.25	148.42	62.10	621	1.2	0.00193	517
Tesla Model 3				1.76	0.00176		15	129.06	54	540	1.2	0.00222	450
Aptera 2 Series	423	507.99	179.82	5.28	0.00528	0.53	5	43	18	180	1.2	0.00666	150
Aptera solar EV				4.5	0.0045		6.2	52.56	22	220	1.2	0.00545	183
Buses
MCI 102DL3	6.03	7.24	2.56	0.07	0.00007	39.04	370.83	3190.73	1335.00	13350	11.0	0.00082	1214
Proterra Catalyst 40' E2				0.23 (Note: The range used is the midpoint of the effective operating range.)	0.00023		121.54	1044.20	437.60	4376	11.0	0.00319	313
Trains
Urban rail												0.00231	432
CR400AF (cn)											~65%	0.00475	210 at 350 km/h
JR East (jp)											~	0.01091	92
CP-Lisbon (pt)											27.7%	0.01304	
Basel (ch)											~50.0%	0.00215	465

== Land transport means ==
=== Walking ===
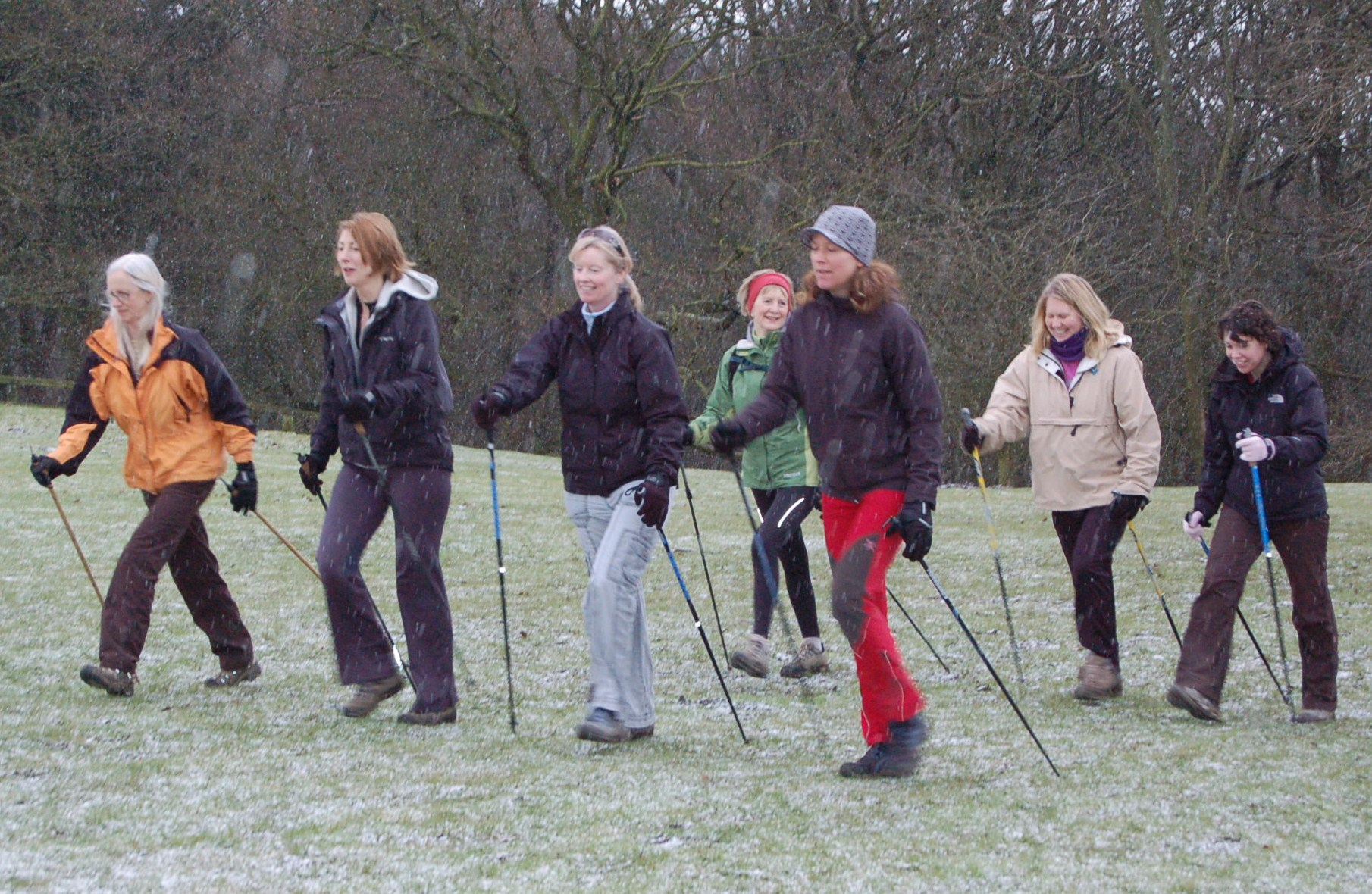
Nordic walkers

A 68 kg (150 lb) person walking at 4 km/h (2.5 mph) requires approximately 210 kilocalories (880 kJ) of food energy per hour, which is equivalent to 4.55 km/MJ. 1 US gal (3.8 L) of petrol contains about 114,000 British thermal units (120 MJ) of energy, so this is approximately equivalent to 360 miles per US gallon (0.65 L/100 km).

=== Velomobile ===
Velomobiles are mostly tricycles, sometimes bicycles or quadracycles, with fully enclosed fairings. Because of the extra weight, the efficiency is slightly reduced uphill and at low speeds, where rolling resistance dominates. At higher speeds they become more efficient than any other vehicles because of their small frontal area and aerodynamic shape.

At a speeds of over 10 m/s (33 ft/s), a velomobile at the same speed needs less than half the power of an unfaired racing bicycle.

Input energy from food used by humans is over 4 times higher. If this is considered, velomobiles with electric motors are the most efficient vehicles in spite of the extra weight of their batteries, as long as they do not become too heavy and continue to use low-resistance tires.

With human power, there is a tradeoff between low aerodynamic drag and cooling of the body, influencing both power capability and comfort, and therefore also of speed and efficiency.

=== Bicycle ===
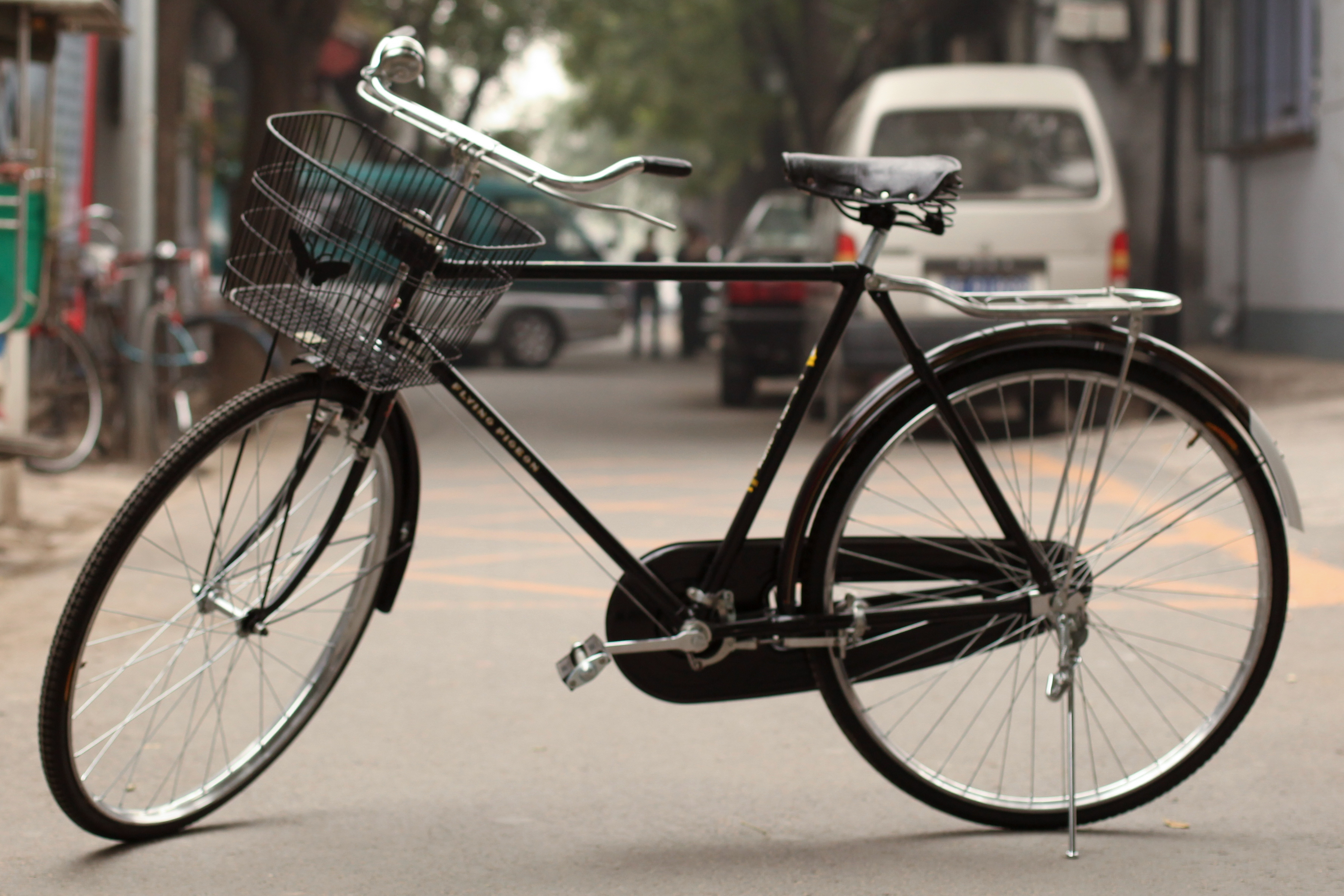
A Chinese Flying Pigeon bicycle

A standard lightweight, moderate-speed bicycle is one of the most energy-efficient forms of transport if food production is not counted or is optimal. Compared with walking, a 64 kg (140 lb) cyclist riding at 16 km/h (10 mph) requires about half the food energy per unit distance: 27 kcal/km, 3.1 kWh (11 MJ) per 100 km, or 43 kcal/mi. This converts to about 732 mpg_{‑US} (0.321 L/100 km; 879 mpg_{‑imp}). This means that a bicycle will use between 10 and 25 times less energy per distance travelled than a personal car, depending on fuel source and size of the car. This figure does depend on the speed and mass of the rider: greater speeds give higher air drag and heavier riders consume more energy per unit distance. In addition, because bicycles are very lightweight (usually between 7–15 kg) this means they consume very low amounts of materials and energy to manufacture. In comparison to an automobile weighing 1500 kg or more, a bicycle typically requires 100–200 times less energy to produce than an automobile.

=== Motorised cycles ===
Histograms of two-wheelers entered by users in spritmonitor.de in May 2026, showing numbers of entries and their consumptions, shown separately for petrol and electricity

There is no clear distinction of construction between motorised bicycles or tricycles and low-powered motorcycles or motorscooters but the fuel consumption is influenced by mandated speed ranges and number of riders.

==== Petrol (gasoline) ====
Engines using petrol are heat engines limited in efficiency, so that only a fraction of the energy is available for propulsion. Motorised bicycles powered by 50 cm³ (3 cu in) two-stroke engines and limited to one person and specified speeds (25 or 30 km/h in some countries) have fuel consumptions from about 1 L/100km (0.354 mpg(imp), 0.425 mpg(US), ~8.5 kWh/100 km) to 3 L/100 km. Models registered as mopeds are often required to have functional pedals fitted, but these are mostly not useable over walking speed. When similarly constructed vehicles, but without pedals and speed limiters, are registered as motorcycles or motorscooters and used at higher speeds, the fuel consumptions can double or more. If a passenger rides shielded by the rider, the fuel consumptions per person at the higher speeds almost halve on a level course. Motorbikes with 125 cm³ motors do not have higher fuel consumptions at the same speeds but can go faster and then use more. More powerful motorcycles (from 23 to 160 kW) were measured for their minimum and maximum consumption (giving from 2.2 and 3.8 L/100km to 7.2 and 13.8 L/100km, respectively) and consumption for normal touring (giving 3.3 and 8.1 L/100km, respectively).

==== Electricity ====
Motors powered by electricity stored in batteries are high in efficiency, so that most of the energy is available for propulsion. But the energy density of batteries is smaller than that of chemical fuels, so the maximum ranges are limited. Electric bicycles run on as little as 0.5 kWh (1.8 MJ) per 100 km, but this is at walking speed. At 20 km/h the electrical energy consumed by the motor rises to 0.9 kWh/100 km, and at 30 km/h to 1.6 kWh/100 km. As soon as the pedals are used, the consumption of electrical energy at a given speed reduces, but the total energy consumption increases if the food energy is counted, even two to four-fold if energy for production is compared between Li-Ion Batteries and a conventional diet. This makes an unpedalled electric bicycle one of the most efficient possible motorised vehicles in common use.

Electric scooters and motorcycles are constructed in a similar manner to petrol-powered ones but are often heavier because of the batteries. Electric motors using electricity from batteries can be about four times as efficient as small internal combustion engines using liquid fuels, yet the energy consumptions entered by private users in the database Spritmonitor (see figure) suggest that electric two-wheelers in actual use on the road are over eight times as efficient. Some of these are limited in speed e.g. to 25 or 45 km/h in some countries, which is one factor contributing to lower consumption.

=== Personal transport devices ===
The energy efficiency of personal transporters such as electric skateboards, electric kick scooters, electric unicycles and Segways correlates with speed, weight and rolling resistance. The air drag of the upright rider is similar to that of an upright bicycle with rider. The rolling resistance depends on tire diameter, hardness or inflation pressure, and road surface. Energy consumptions range from 1 to 2 kWh (3.6-7.2 MJ) per 100 km.

==== Electric kick scooter ====
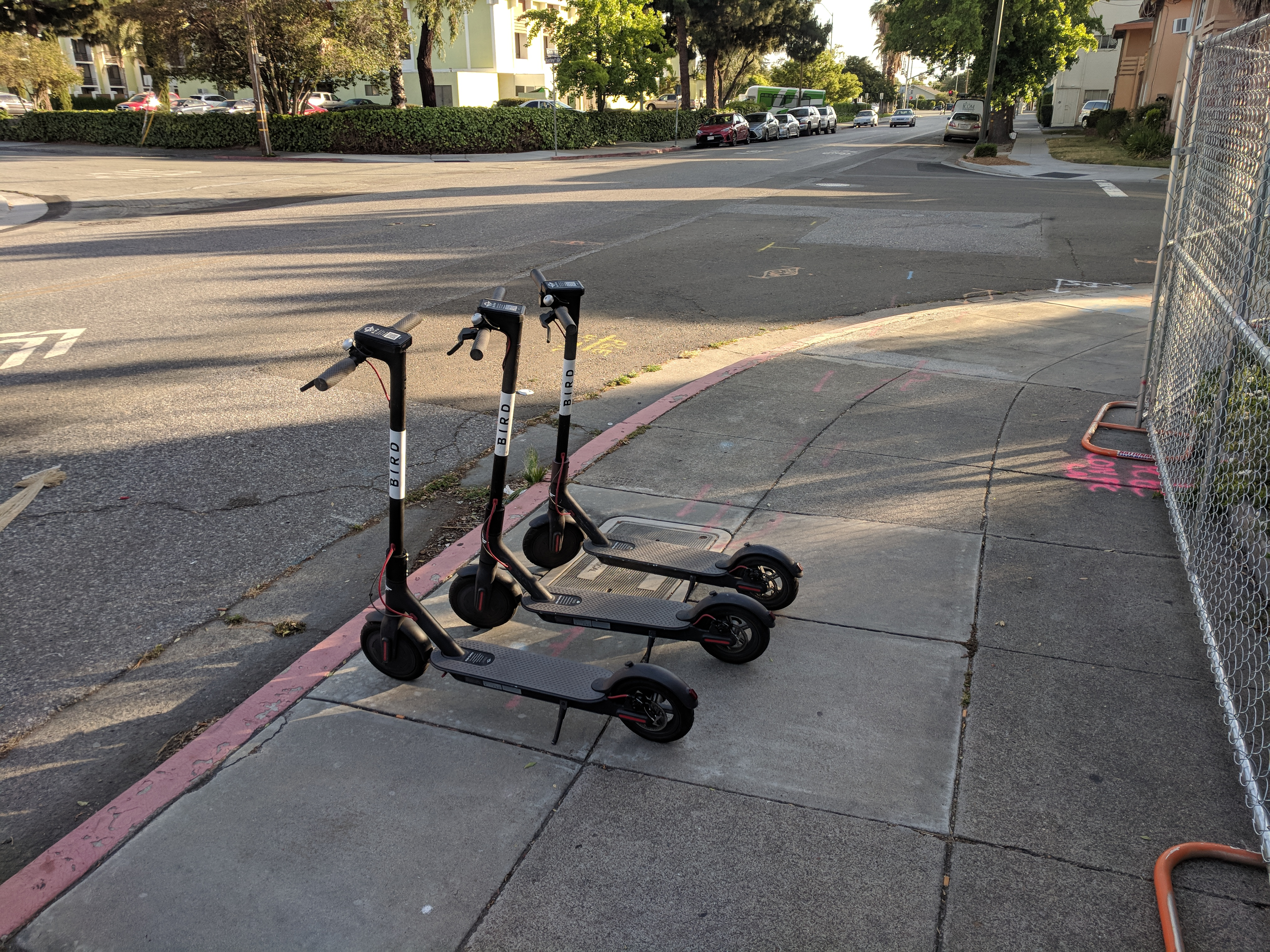
Electric kick scooters, part of a scooter-sharing system, in San Jose, California.

Electric kick scooters, such as those used by scooter-sharing systems like Bird or Lime, typically have a maximum range of under 30 km (19 mi) and are commonly limited to a maximum speed of 20 or 25 km/h (12.4 or 15.5 mph), depending on jurisdiction. Intended to fit into a last mile niche and be ridden in bike lanes, they require little skill from the rider. A typical energy consumption is 1.4-1.5 kWh (5-5.4 MJ) per 100 km. However, as they must be recharged frequently, they are often collected overnight with motor vehicles, somewhat negating this efficiency. The lifetime of electric scooters is notably short, so that in a life-cycle assessment the energy used and especially the environmental costs for production are much higher than those associated with usage.

=== Automobiles ===
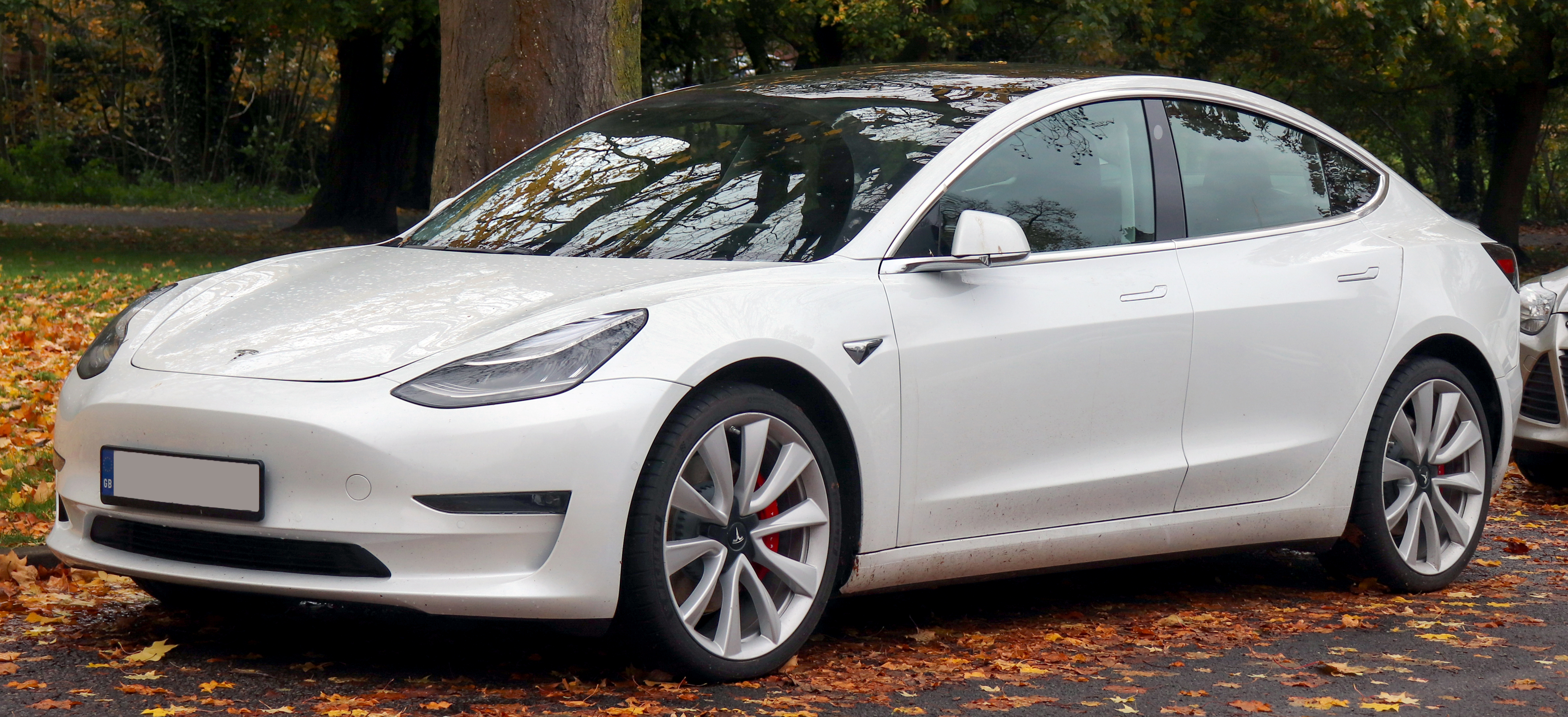
The Tesla Model 3, an electric vehicle with an efficiency of 131 mpge (26 kWh/100 miles).

Automobiles are generally inefficient when compared to other modes of transport, due to the relatively high weight of the vehicle compared to its occupants. On a percentage basis, if there is one occupant in an automobile, only about 0.5% of the total energy used is used to move the person in the car, while the remaining 99.5% (about 200 times more) is used to move the car itself.

An important driver of energy consumption of cars per passenger is the occupancy rate of the vehicle. Although the consumption per unit distance per vehicle increases with increasing number of passengers, this increase is slight compared to the reduction in consumption per unit distance per passenger. This means that higher occupancy yields higher energy efficiency per passenger. Automobile occupancy varies across regions. For example, the estimated average occupancy rate is about 1.3 passengers per car in the San Francisco Bay Area, while the 2006 UK estimated average is 1.58.

Due to the efficiency of electric motors, electric cars are much more efficient than their internal combustion engine counterparts, consuming on the order of 38 megajoules (38 000 kJ) per 100 km in comparison to 142 megajoules per 100 km for combustion powered cars. However, depending on the way the electricity is generated, the actual primary energy use may be higher.

Driving practices and vehicles can be modified to improve their energy efficiency by about 15%.

==== Common efficiency measures ====
Automobile fuel efficiency is most commonly expressed in terms of the volume of fuel consumed per one hundred kilometres (l/100 km), but in some countries (including the United States, the United Kingdom and India) it is more commonly expressed in terms of the distance per volume fuel consumed (km/L or miles per gallon). This is complicated by the different energy content of fuels such as petrol and diesel. The Oak Ridge National Laboratory (ORNL) states that the energy content of unleaded petrol is 115,000 British thermal unit (BTU) per US gallon (32 MJ/L) compared to 130,500 BTU per US gallon (36.4 MJ/L) for diesel.

==== Life-cycle energy use ====
Car life cycle

Automobiles have significant energy use in their life cycle, not directly attributable to the running of the vehicle. An important consideration is the energy costs of producing the energy form used by the automobile. Bio-fuels, electricity and hydrogen, for instance, have significant energy inputs in their production. Hydrogen production efficiency are 50–70% when produced from natural gas, and 10–15% from electricity. The efficiency of hydrogen production, as well as the energy required to store and transport hydrogen, must to be combined with the vehicle efficiency to yield net efficiency. Because of this, hydrogen automobiles are one of the least efficient means of passenger transport, generally around 50 times as much energy must be put into the production of hydrogen compared to how much is used to move the car.

Another important factor is the energy needed to build and maintain roads is an important consideration, as is the energy returned on energy invested (EROEI). Between these two factors, roughly 20% must be added to the energy of the fuel consumed, to accurately account for the total energy used.

Finally, vehicle energy efficiency calculations would be misleading without factoring the energy cost of producing the vehicle itself. This initial energy cost can of course be depreciated over the life of the vehicle to calculate an average energy efficiency over its effective life span. In other words, vehicles that take a lot of energy to produce and are used for relatively short periods will require a great deal more energy over their effective lifespan than those that do not, and are therefore much less energy efficient than they may otherwise seem. Hybrid and electric cars use less energy in their operation than comparable petroleum-fuelled cars but more energy is used to manufacture them, so the overall difference would be less than immediately apparent. Compare, for example, walking, which requires no special equipment at all, and an automobile, produced in and shipped from another country, and made from parts manufactured around the world from raw materials and minerals mined and processed elsewhere again, and used for a limited number of years. According to the French energy and environment agency ADEME, an average motor car has an embodied energy content of 20,800 kWh and an average electric vehicle amounts to 34,700 kWh. The electric car requires nearly twice as much energy to produce, primarily due to the large amount of mining and purification necessary for the rare earth metals and other materials used in lithium-ion batteries and in the electric drive motors. This represents a significant portion of the energy used over the life of the car (in some cases nearly as much as energy that is used through the fuel that is consumed, effectively doubling the car's per-distance energy consumption), and cannot be ignored when comparing automobiles to other transport modes. As these are average numbers for French automobiles and they are likely to be significantly larger in more auto-centric countries like the United States and Canada, where much larger and heavier cars are more common. The usage of private vehicles can be significantly decreased and can help to promote sustainable urban growth if more appealing non-motorized transportation options are developed, as well as more comfortable public transportation environments.

==== Example consumption figures ====
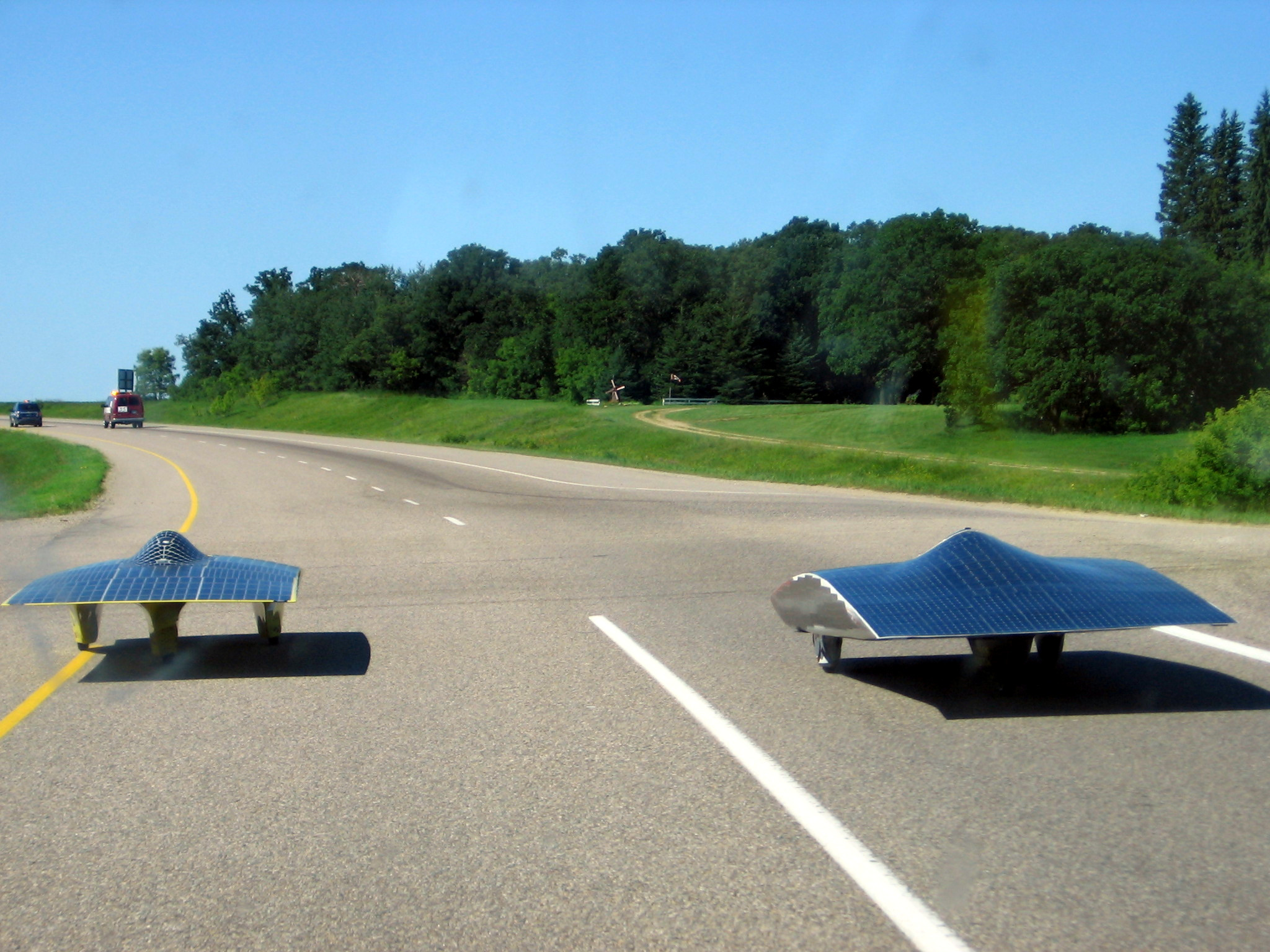
Two American solar cars in Canada

- Solar cars are electric vehicles that use little or no externally supplied energy other than from sunlight, charging the batteries from built-in solar panels, and typically use less than 3 kWh per 100 miles (67 kJ/km or 1.86 kWh/100 km). Most of these cars are race cars designed for competition and not for passenger or utility use. However several companies are designing solar cars for public use. As of December 2021, none have yet been released.
- The four passenger GEM NEV uses 169 Wh/mi (199 mpg‑e; 10.5 kW⋅h/100 km), which equates to 2.6 kWh/100 km per person when fully occupied, albeit at only 24 mph (39 km/h).
- The General Motors EV1 was rated in a test with a charging efficiency of 373 Wh-AC/mile or 23 kWh/100 km approximately equivalent to 2.6 L/100 km (110 mpg_{‑imp}; 90 mpg_{‑US}) for petroleum-fuelled vehicles.
- Chevrolet Volt in full electric mode uses 36 kilowatt-hours per 100 miles (810 kJ/km; 94 mpg‑e), meaning it may approach or exceed the energy efficiency of walking if the car is fully occupied with 4 or more passengers, although the relative emissions produced may not follow the same trends if analysing environmental impacts.
- The Daihatsu Charade 993cc turbo diesel (1987–1993) won the most fuel efficient vehicle award for going round the United Kingdom consuming an average of 2.82 L/100 km (100 mpg_{‑imp}). It was surpassed only recently by the VW Lupo 3 L which consumes about 2.77 L/100 km (102 mpg_{‑imp}). Both cars are rare to find on the popular market. The Daihatsu had major problems with rust and structural safety which contributes to its rarity and the quite short production run.
- The Volkswagen Polo 1.4 TDI Bluemotion and the SEAT Ibiza 1.4 TDI Ecomotion, both rated at 3.8 L/100 km (74 mpg_{‑imp}; 62 mpg_{‑US}) (combined) were the most fuel efficient petroleum-fuelled cars on sale in the UK as of 22 March 2008.
- Honda Insight – achieves 60 mpg_{‑US} (3.9 L/100 km; 72 mpg_{‑imp}) under real-world conditions.
- Honda Civic Hybrid regularly averages around 45 mpg_{‑US} (5.2 L/100 km; 54 mpg_{‑imp}).
- 2012 Cadillac CTS-V Wagon 6.2 L Supercharged, 14 mpg_{‑US} (17 L/100 km; 17 mpg_{‑imp})
- 2012 Bugatti Veyron, 10 mpg_{‑US} (24 L/100 km; 12 mpg_{‑imp})
- 2018 Honda Civic: 36 mpg_{‑US} (6.5 L/100 km; 43 mpg_{‑imp})
- 2017 Mitsubishi Mirage: 39 mpg_{‑US} (6.0 L/100 km; 47 mpg_{‑imp})
- 2017 Hyundai Ioniq hybrid: 55 mpg_{‑US} (4.3 L/100 km; 66 mpg_{‑imp})
- 2017 Toyota Prius: 56 mpg_{‑US} (4.2 L/100 km; 67 mpg_{‑imp}) (Eco trim)
- 2018 Nissan Leaf: 30 kWh (110 MJ)/100 mi (671 kJ/km) or 112 MPGe
- 2017 Hyundai Ioniq EV: 25 kWh (90 MJ)/100 mi (560 kJ/km) or 136 MPGe
- 2020 Tesla model 3: 24 kWh (86.4 MJ)/100 mi (540 kJ/km) or 141 MPGe

=== Trains ===
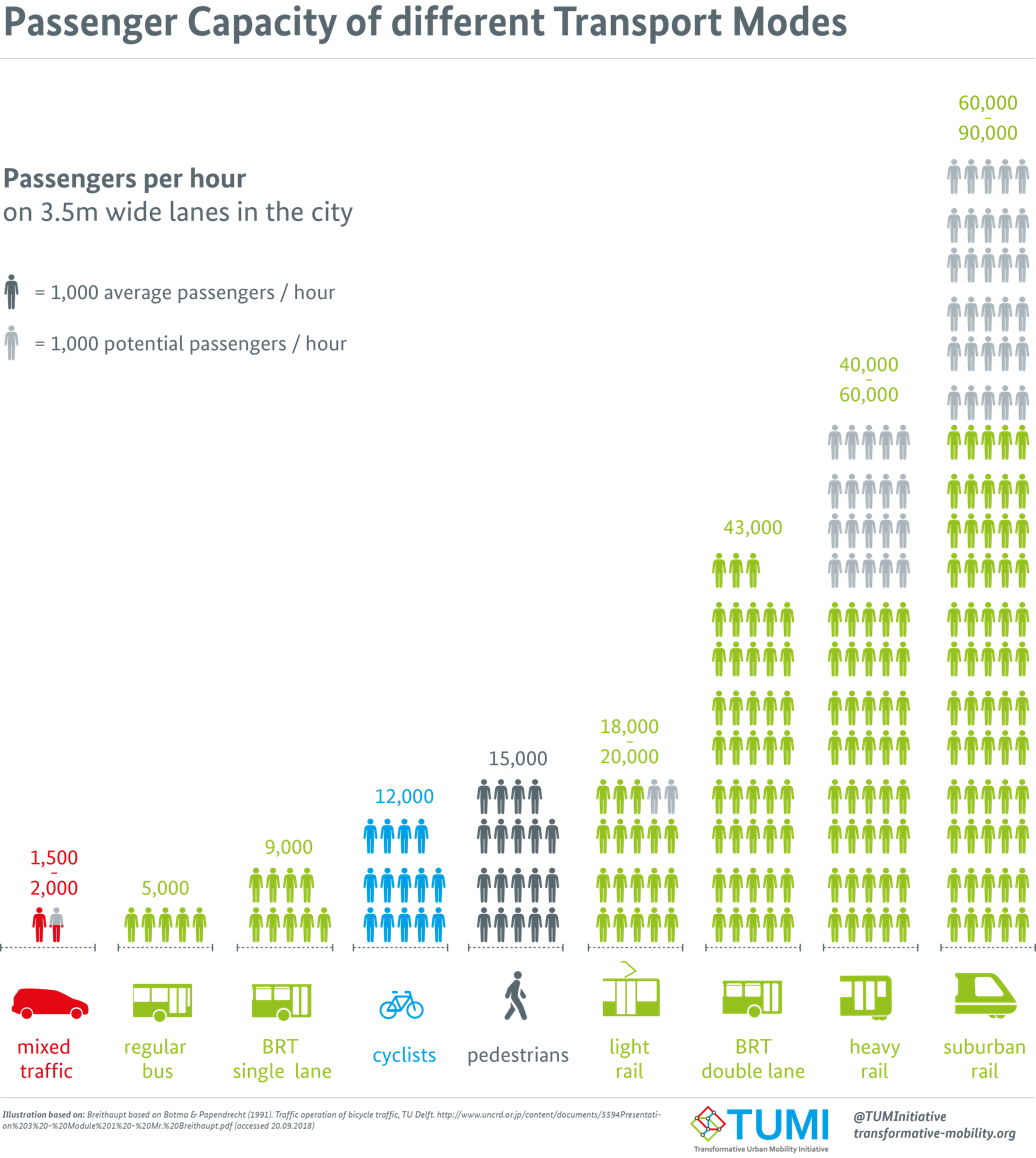

Trains are in general one of the most efficient means of transport for freight and passengers. Advantages of trains include low friction of steel wheels on steel rails, as well as an intrinsic high occupancy rate. Train lines are typically used to serve urban or inter-urban transit applications where their capacity utilization is maximized.

Efficiency varies significantly with passenger loads, and losses incurred in electricity generation and supply (for electrified systems), and, importantly, end-to-end delivery, where stations are not the originating final destinations of a journey. While electric motors used in most passenger trains are more efficient than internal combustion engines, power generation in thermal power plants is limited to (at best) Carnot efficiency and there are transmission losses on the way from the power plant to the train. Switzerland, which has electrified virtually its entire railway network (heritage railways like the Dampfbahn Furka-Bergstrecke being notable exceptions), derives much of the electricity used by trains from hydropower, including pumped hydro storage. While the mechanical efficiency of the turbines involved is comparatively high, pumped hydro involves energy losses and is only cost effective as it can consume energy during times of excess production (leading to low or even negative spot prices) and release the energy again during high-demand times. with some sources claiming up to 87%.

Actual consumption depends on gradients, maximum speeds, and loading and stopping patterns. Data produced for the European MEET project (Methodologies for Estimating Air Pollutant Emissions) illustrate the different consumption patterns over several track sections. The results show the consumption for a German ICE high-speed train varied from around 19 to 33 kW⋅h/km (68–119 MJ/km; 31–53 kW⋅h/mi). The Siemens Velaro D type ICE trains seat 460 (16 of which in the restaurant car) in their 200-meter length edition of which two can be coupled together. Per Deutsche Bahn calculations, the energy used per 100 seat-km is the equivalent of 0.33 litres (12 imp fl oz) of gasoline (0.33 litres per 100 kilometres (860 mpg_{‑imp}; 710 mpg_{‑US})). The data also reflects the weight of the train per passenger. For example, TGV double-deck Duplex trains use lightweight materials, which keep axle loads down and reduce damage to track and also save energy. The TGV mostly runs on French nuclear fission power plants which are again limited – as all thermal power plants – to Carnot efficiency. Due to nuclear reprocessing being standard operating procedure, a higher share of the energy contained in the original Uranium is used in France than in e.g. the United States with its once thru fuel cycle.

The specific energy consumption of the trains worldwide amounts to about 150 kJ/pkm (kilojoule per passenger kilometre) and 150 kJ/tkm (kilojoule per tonne kilometre) (ca. 4.2 kWh/100 pkm and 4.2 kWh/100 tkm) in terms of final energy. Passenger transportation by rail systems requires less energy than by car or plane (one seventh of the energy needed to move a person by car in an urban context,). This is the reason why, although accounting for 9% of world passenger transportation activity (expressed in pkm) in 2015, rail passenger services represented only 1% of final energy demand in passenger transportation.

==== Freight ====
Energy consumption estimates for rail freight vary widely, and many are provided by interested parties. Some are tabulated below.

Country	Year	Fuel economy (weight of goods)	Energy Intensity
USA	2007	185.363 km/L (1 short ton)	energy/mass-distance
USA	2018	473 miles/gallon (1 ton)	energy/mass-distance
UK	—	87 t·km/L	0.41 MJ/t·km (LHV)

==== Passenger ====
Country	Year	Train efficiency	Per passenger-km (kJ)	Note
China	2018	9.7 MJ (2.7 kWh) /car-km	137 kJ/passenger-km (at 100% load)	CR400AF@350 km/h Beijing-Shanghai PDL 1302 km average
Japan	2004	17.9 MJ (5.0 kWh)/car-km	350 kJ/passenger-km	JR East average
Japan	2017	1.49 kWh/car-km	≈92 kJ/passenger-km	JR East Conventional Rail
EC	1997	18 kW⋅h/km (65 MJ/km)		
USA		1.125 mpg_{‑US} (209.1 L/100 km; 1.351 mpg_{‑imp})	468 passenger-miles/US gallon (0.503 L/100 passenger-km)	
Switzerland	2011	2300 GWhr/yr	470 kJ/passenger-km	
Basel, Switzerland		1.53 kWh/vehicle-km (5.51 MJ/vehicle-km)	85 kJ/passenger-km (150 kJ/passenger-km at 80% average load)	
USA	2009		2,435 BTU/mi (1.60 MJ/km)	
Portugal	2011	8.5 kW⋅h/km (31 MJ/km; 13.7 kW⋅h/mi)		

==== Braking losses ====
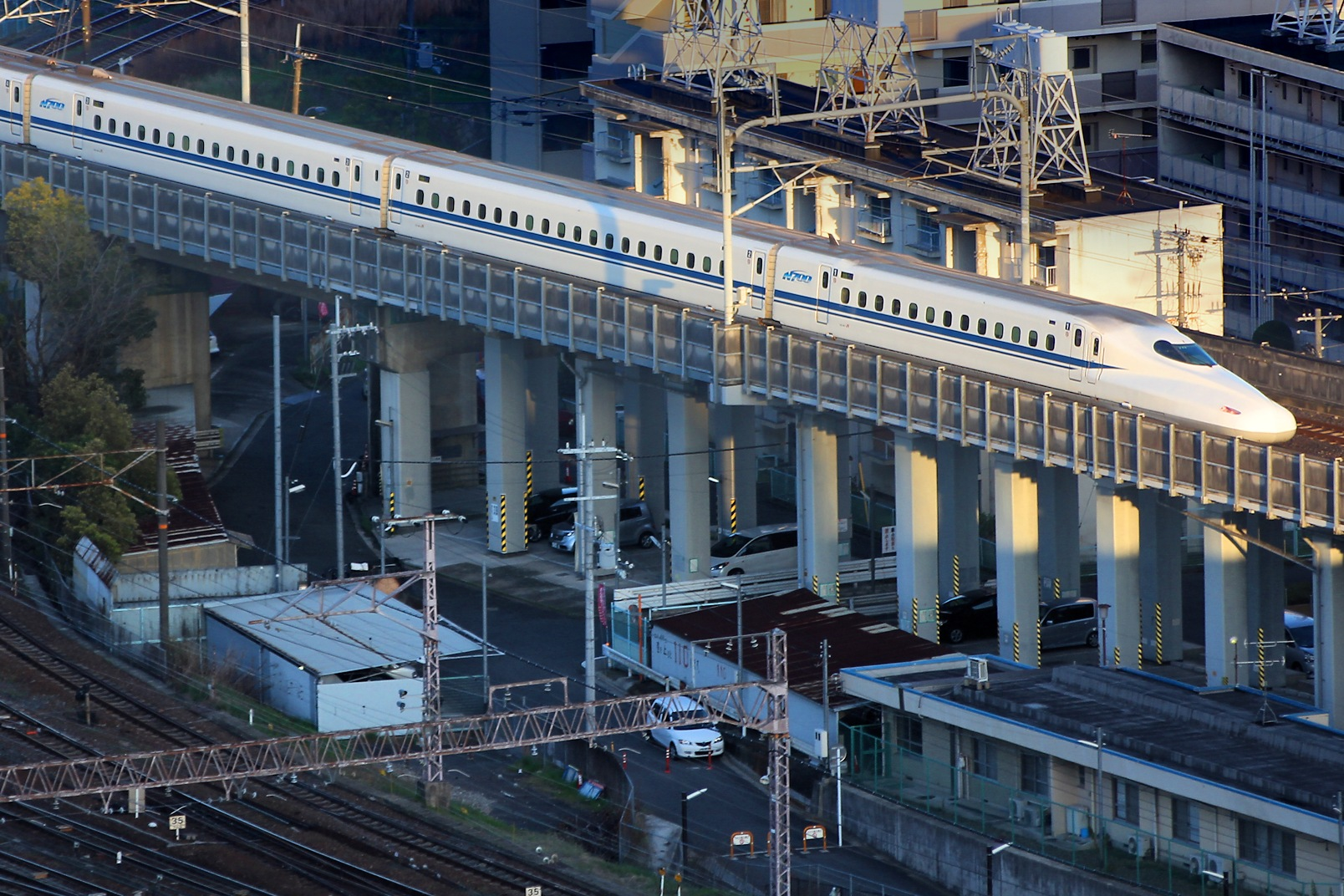
N700 Series Shinkansen uses regenerative braking

Having to accelerate and decelerate a heavy train load of people at every stop is inefficient. Modern electric trains therefore use regenerative braking to return current into the catenary while they brake. The International Union of Railways has stated that full stop service commuter trains reduce emissions by 8-14% by employing regenerative braking, and very dense suburban network trains by ~30%. High-speed electric trains like the N700 Series Shinkansen (the Bullet Train) employ regenerative braking, but due to the high speed, UIC estimates regenerative braking to only reduce emissions by 4.5%.

=== Buses ===
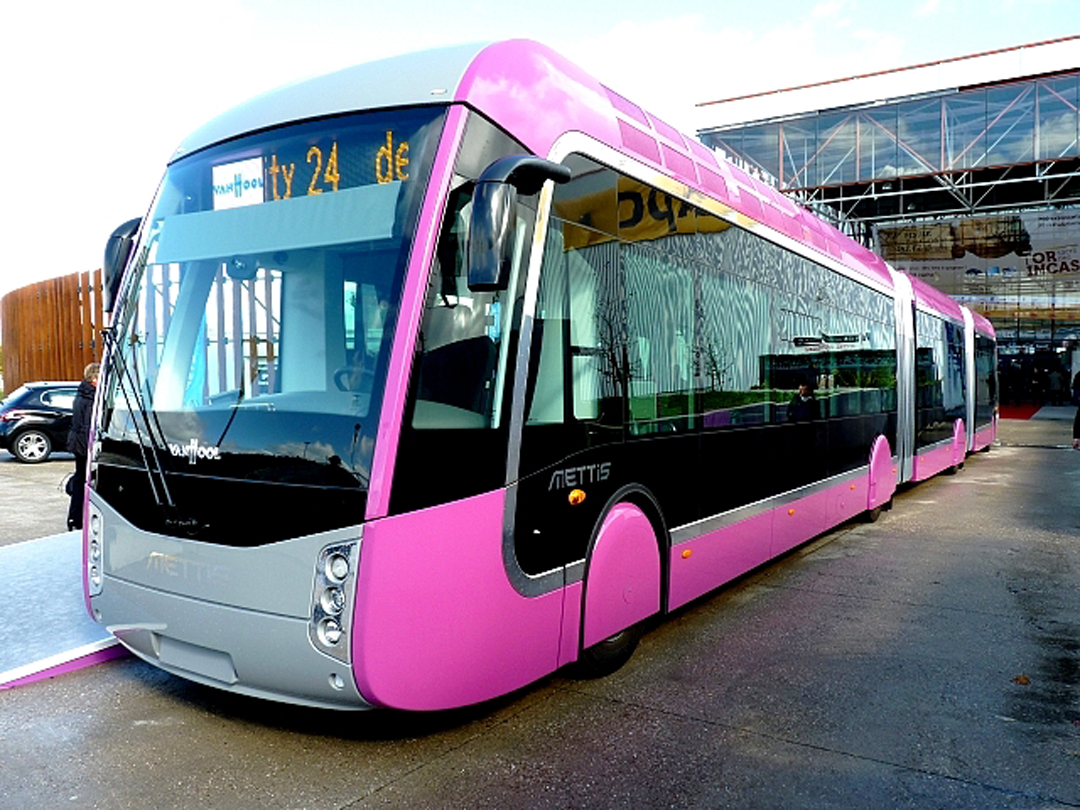
The bus rapid transit of Metz uses a diesel-electric hybrid driving system, developed by Belgian Van Hool manufacturer.

- In 2024, the average occupancy for buses in Great Britain was stated to be 11.9 passengers per vehicle.
- The fleet of 244 40-foot (12 m) 1982 New Flyer trolley buses in local service with BC Transit in Vancouver, Canada, in 1994/95 used 35,454,170 kWh for 12,966,285 vehicle km, or 9.84 MJ/vehicle km. Exact ridership on trolleybuses is not known, but with all 34 seats filled this equates to 0.32 MJ/passenger km. It is quite common to see people standing on Vancouver trolleybuses. This is a service with many stops per kilometre; part of the reason for the efficiency is the use of regenerative braking.
- A commuter service in Santa Barbara, California, USA, found average diesel bus efficiency of 6.0 mpg_{‑US} (39 L/100 km; 7.2 mpg_{‑imp}) (using MCI 102DL3 buses). With all 55 seats filled this equates to 330 passenger mpg; with 70% filled, 231 passenger mpg.
- In 2011 the fleet of 752 buses in the city of Lisbon had an average speed of 14.4 km/h and an average occupancy of 20.1 passengers per vehicle.
- Battery electric buses combine the electric motive power of a trolleybus, the drawbacks of battery manufacture, weight and lifespan with the routing flexibility of a bus with any onboard power. Major manufacturers include BYD and Proterra.

=== Other ===
- NASA's Crawler-Transporter was used to haul the Saturn V and Space Shuttle rockets from storage to the launch pad. It uses diesel and has one of the highest fuel consumption rates on record, 150 US gallons per mile (350 L/km; 120 imp gal/mi).

== Air transport means ==
=== Aircraft ===
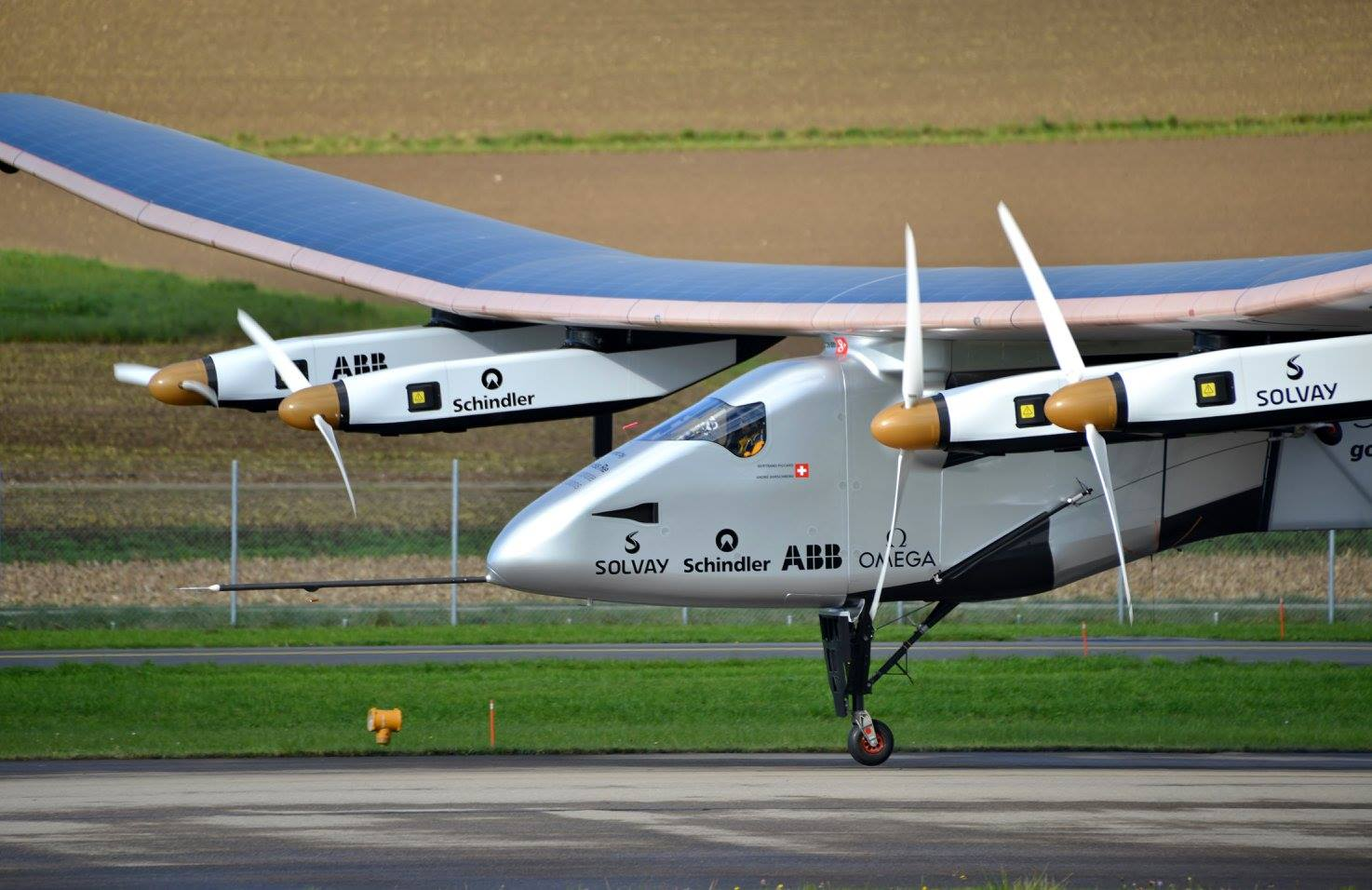
Solar Impulse 2, a solar aircraft

A principal determinant of energy consumption in aircraft is drag.

- Drag is proportional to the lift required for flight, which is equal to the weight of the aircraft. As induced drag increases with weight, weight reduction, with improvements in engine efficiency and reductions in aerodynamic drag, has been a principal source of efficiency gains in aircraft, with a rule-of-thumb being that a 1% weight reduction corresponds to around a 0.75% reduction in fuel consumption.
- Flight altitude affects engine efficiency. Jet-engine efficiency increases at altitude up to the tropopause, the temperature minimum of the atmosphere. Jet engine efficiency also increases at higher speeds, but above about Mach 0.85 the aircraft drag increases faster.
- Compressibility effects: beginning at transonic speeds of around Mach 0.85, shockwaves form increasing drag.
- At supersonic speeds, higher fuel consumption is counterbalanced by a shorter flight time.

Concorde fuel efficiency comparison (assuming jets are filled to capacity)
Aircraft	Concorde	Boeing 747-400
Passenger-miles/imperial gallon	17	109
Passenger-miles/US gallon	14	91
Litres/100 passenger-km	16.6	3.1

Passenger airplanes averaged 4.8 L/100 km per passenger (1.4 MJ/passenger-km) (49 passenger-miles per gallon) in 1998. On average 20% of seats are left unoccupied. Jet aircraft efficiencies are improving: Between 1960 and 2000 there was a 55% overall fuel efficiency gain (if one were to exclude the inefficient and limited fleet of the DH Comet 4 and to consider the Boeing 707 as the base case). Most of the improvements in efficiency were gained in the first decade when jet craft first came into widespread commercial use. Compared to advanced piston engine airliners of the 1950s, current jet airliners are only marginally more efficient per passenger-mile. Between 1971 and 1998 the fleet-average annual improvement per available seat-kilometre was estimated at 2.4%. Concorde the supersonic transport managed about 17 passenger-miles to the Imperial gallon; similar to a business jet, but much worse than a subsonic turbofan aircraft. Airbus puts the fuel rate consumption of their A380 at less than 3 L/100 km per passenger (78 passenger-miles per US gallon).

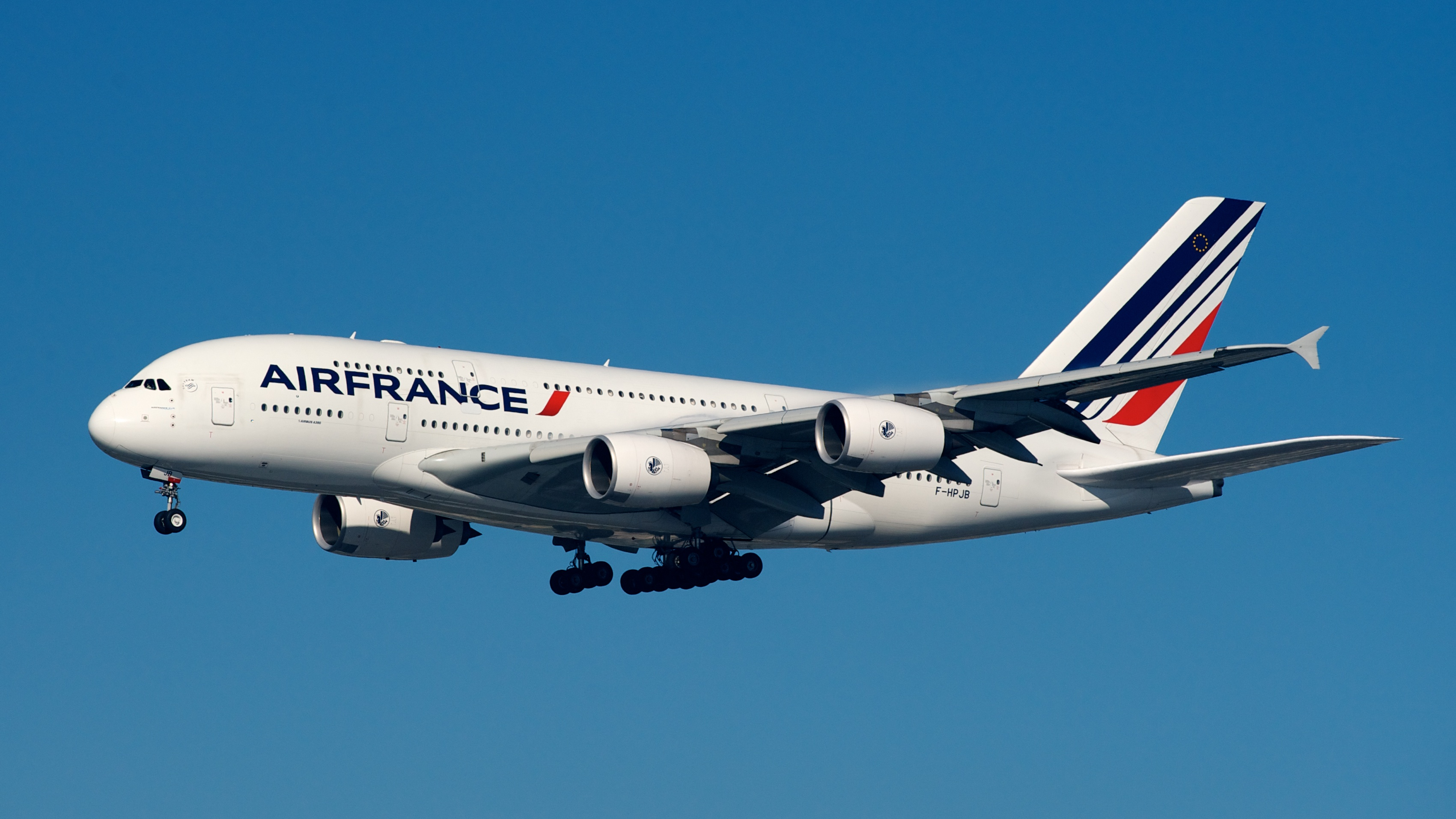
Air France Airbus A380-800

The weight of an aircraft can be reduced by using lighter-weight materials such as titanium, carbon fibre and other composite plastics. Expensive materials may be used, if the reduction of weight justifies the price of materials through improved fuel efficiency. The improvements achieved in fuel efficiency by weight reduction, reduces the amount of fuel that needs to be carried. This further reduces the weight of the aircraft and therefore enables further gains in fuel efficiency.

Airbus has showcased wingtip devices (sharklets or winglets) that can achieve 3.5 percent reduction in fuel consumption. There are wingtip devices on the Airbus A380. Further developed Minix winglets have been said to offer 6 percent reduction in fuel consumption. Winglets at the tip of an aircraft wing smooth out the wing-tip vortex (reducing the aircraft's wing drag) and can be retrofitted to any airplane.

NASA and Boeing are conducting tests on a 500 lb (230 kg) "blended wing" aircraft. This design allows for greater fuel efficiency since the whole craft produces lift, not just the wings. The blended wing body (BWB) concept offers advantages in structural, aerodynamic and operating efficiencies over today's more conventional fuselage-and-wing designs. These features translate into greater range, fuel economy, reliability and life cycle savings, as well as lower manufacturing costs. NASA has created a cruise efficient STOL (CESTOL) concept.

Fraunhofer Institute for Manufacturing Engineering and Applied Materials Research (IFAM) have researched a shark skin imitating paint that would reduce drag through a riblet effect. Aircraft are a major potential application for new technologies such as aluminium metal foam and nanotechnology such as the shark skin imitating paint.

Propeller systems, such as turboprops and propfans are a more fuel efficient technology than jets. But turboprops have an optimum speed below about 450 mph (700 km/h). This speed is less than used with jets by major airlines today. With the current high price for jet fuel and the emphasis on engine/airframe efficiency to reduce emissions, there is renewed interest in the propfan concept for jetliners that might come into service beyond the Boeing 787 and Airbus A350XWB. For instance, Airbus has patented aircraft designs with twin rear-mounted counter-rotating propfans. NASA has conducted an Advanced Turboprop Project (ATP), where they researched a variable pitch propfan that produced less noise and achieved high speeds.

Related to fuel efficiency is the impact of aviation emissions on climate.

==== Small aircraft ====
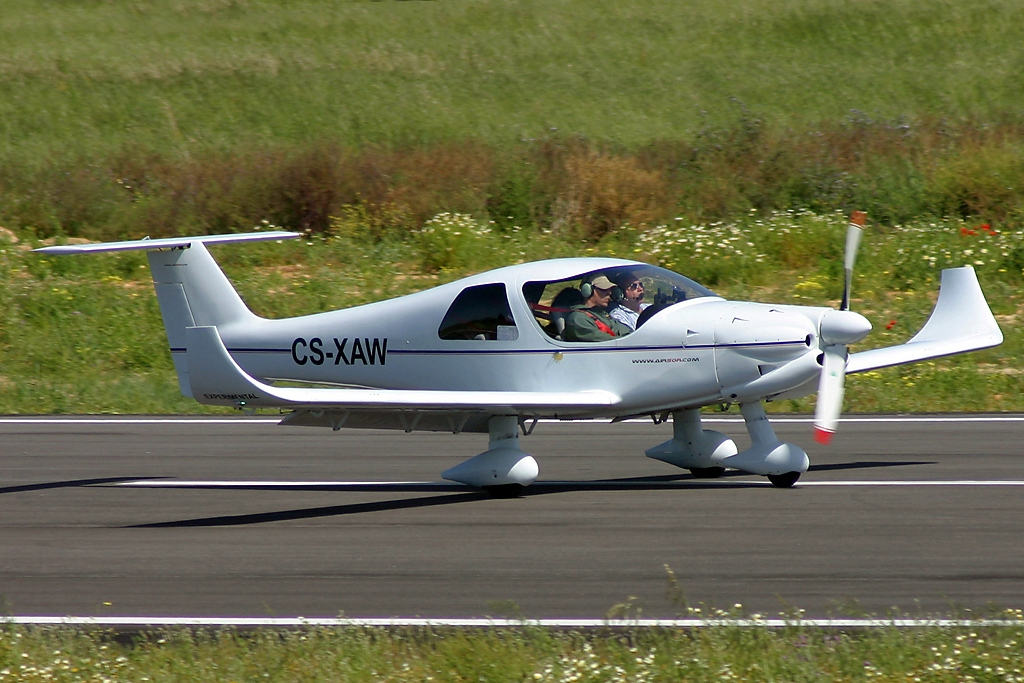
Dyn'Aéro MCR4S

- Motor-gliders can reach an extremely low fuel consumption for cross-country flights, if favourable thermal air currents and winds are present.
- At 160 km/h, a diesel powered two-seater Dieselis burns 6 litres of fuel per hour, 1.9 litres per 100 passenger km.
- at 220 km/h, a four-seater 100 hp MCR-4S burns 20 litres of gas per hour, 2.2 litres per 100 passenger km.
- Under continuous motorised flight at 225 km/h, a Pipistrel Sinus burns 11 litres of fuel per flight hour. Carrying 2 people aboard, it operates at 2.4 litres per 100 passenger km.
- Ultralight aircraft Tecnam P92 Echo Classic at cruise speed of 185 km/h burns 17 litres of fuel per flight hour, 4.6 litres per 100 passenger km (2 people). Other modern ultralight aircraft have increased efficiency; Tecnam P2002 Sierra RG at cruise speed of 237 km/h burns 17 litres of fuel per flight hour, 3.6 litres per 100 passenger km (2 people).
- Two-seater and four-seater flying at 250 km/h with old generation engines can burn 25 to 40 litres per flight hour, 3 to 5 litres per 100 passenger km.
- The Sikorsky S-76C++ twin turbine helicopter gets about 1.65 mpg_{‑US} (143 L/100 km; 1.98 mpg_{‑imp}) at 140 knots (260 km/h; 160 mph) and carries 12 for about 19.8 passenger-miles per gallon (11.9 L per 100 passenger km).

== Water transport means ==
=== Ships ===
==== Queen Elizabeth ====
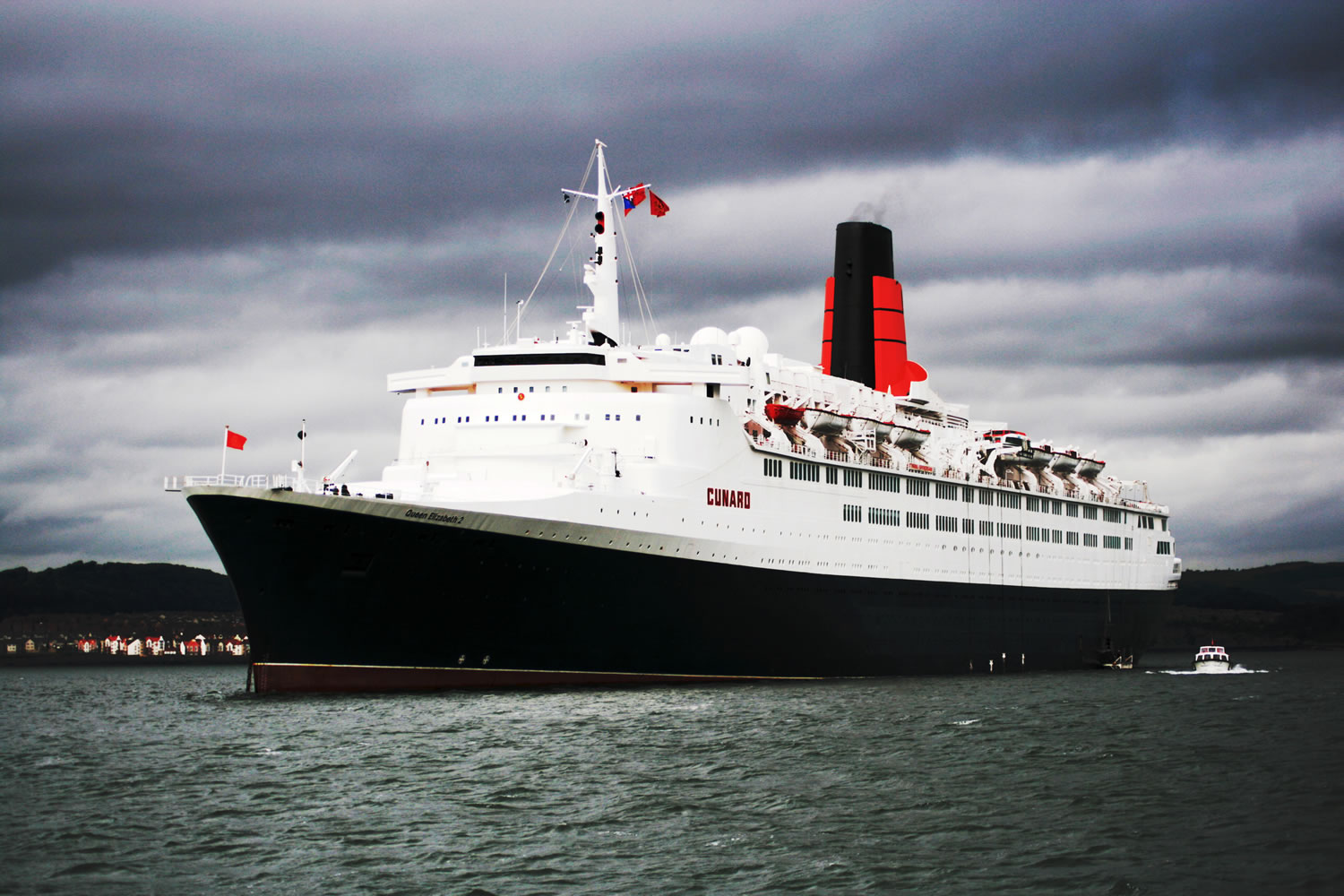
Queen Elizabeth 2

Cunard stated that Queen Elizabeth 2 travelled 49.5 feet per imperial gallon of diesel oil (3.32 m/L or 41.2 ft/US gal), and that it had a passenger capacity of 1777. Thus carrying 1777 passengers we can calculate an efficiency of 16.7 passenger miles per imperial gallon (16.9 L/100 p·km or 13.9 p·mpg_{–US}).

==== Cruise ships ====
MS Oasis of the Seas has a capacity of 6,296 passengers and a fuel efficiency of 14.4 passenger miles per US gallon. Voyager-class cruise ships have a capacity of 3,114 passengers and a fuel efficiency of 12.8 passenger miles per US gallon.

==== Emma Maersk ====
Emma Maersk uses a Wärtsilä-Sulzer RTA96-C, which consumes 163 g/kWh and 13,000 kg/h. If it carries 13,000 containers then 1 kg fuel transports one container for one hour over a distance of 45 km. The ship takes 18 days from Tanjung (Singapore) to Rotterdam (Netherlands), 11 from Tanjung to Suez, and 7 from Suez to Rotterdam, which is roughly 430 hours, and has 80 MW, +30 MW. 18 days at a mean speed of 25 knots (46 km/h) gives a total distance of 10,800 nautical miles (20,000 km).

Assuming the Emma Maersk consumes diesel (as opposed to fuel oil which would be the more precise fuel) then 1 kg diesel = 1.202 litres = 0.317 US gallons. This corresponds to 46,525 kJ. Assuming a standard 14 tonnes per container (per teu) this yields 74 kJ per tonne-km at a speed of 45 km/h (24 knots).

==== Boats ====
A sailboat, much like a solar boat, can locomote without consuming any fuel. However some energy is required by the crew to steer the boat and adjust the sails using lines, and for propulsion in adverse conditions. In addition energy will be needed for demands other than propulsion, such as cooking, heating or lighting.

The energy efficiency of a motor boat or a human-powered boat is highly dependent on its type, displacement, and speed, and also on the type of fuel, food or electricity used for propulsion.

== International transport comparisons ==
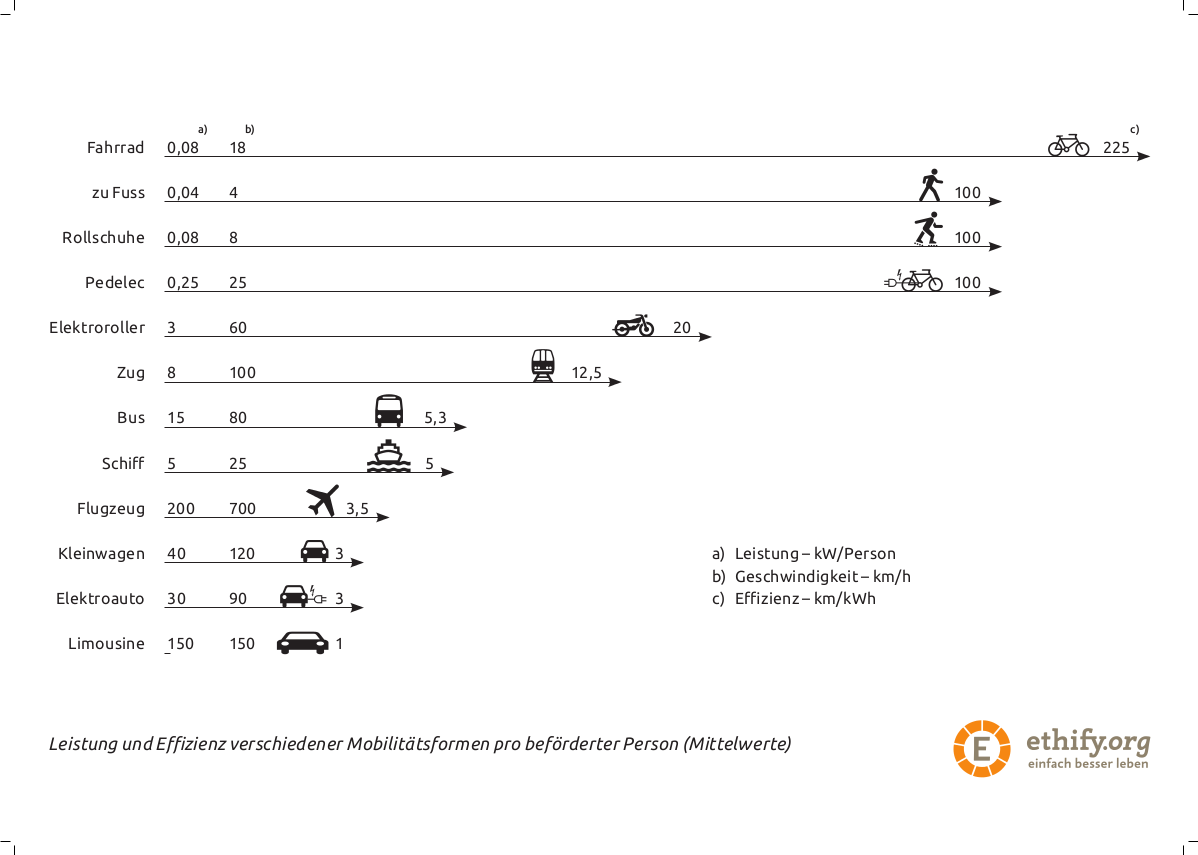

=== European Public transport ===
Rail and bus are generally required to serve 'off peak' and rural services, which by their nature have lower loads than city bus routes and inter city train lines. Moreover, due to their 'walk on' ticketing it is much harder to match daily demand and passenger numbers. As a consequence, the overall load factor on UK railways is 35% or 90 people per train:

Conversely, airline services generally work on point-to-point networks between large population centres and are 'pre-book' in nature. Using yield management, overall load factors can be raised to around 70–90%. Intercity train operators have begun to use similar techniques, with loads reaching typically 71% overall for TGV services in France and a similar figure for the UK's Virgin Rail Group services.

For emissions, the electricity generating source needs to be taken into account.

=== US Passenger transport ===
The US Transport Energy Data Book states the following figures for passenger transport in 2018. These are based on actual consumption of energy, at whatever occupancy rates there were. For modes using electricity, losses during generation and distribution are included. Values are not directly comparable due to differences in types of services, routes, etc.

Transport mode	Average passengers per vehicle	BTU per passenger-mile	MJ per passenger-kilometre
Rail (transit light & heavy)	23.5	1,813	1.189
Rail (intercity Amtrak)	23.3	1,963	1.287
Motorcycles	1.2	2,369	1.553
Air	118.7	2,341	1.535
Rail (commuter)	33.6	2,398	1.572
Cars	1.5	2,847	1.866
Personal trucks	1.8	3,276	2.148
Buses (transit)	7.7	4,578	3.001
Demand response	1.1	14,660	9.61

=== US Freight transport ===
The US Transport Energy book states the following figures for freight transport in 2010:

transport mode	Fuel consumption	
transport mode	BTU per short ton-mile	kJ per tonne-kilometre
Domestic waterborne	217	160
Class 1 railroads	289	209
Heavy trucks	3,357	2,426
Air freight (approx.)	9,600	6,900

From 1960 to 2010 the efficiency of air freight has increased 75%, mostly due to more efficient jet engines.

1 gal_{-US} (3.785 L, 0.833 gal_{-imp}) of fuel can move a ton of cargo 857 km or 462 nmi by barge, or 337 km (209 mi) by rail, or 98 km (61 mi) by lorry.

Compare:

- Space Shuttle used to transport freight to the other side of the Earth (see above): 40 megajoules per tonne-kilometre.
- Net energy for lifting: 10 megajoules per tonne-kilometre.

=== Canadian transport ===
Natural Resources Canada's Office of Energy Efficiency publishes annual statistics regarding the efficiency of the entire Canadian fleet. For researchers, these fuel consumption estimates are more realistic than the fuel consumption ratings of new vehicles, as they represent the real world driving conditions, including extreme weather and traffic. The annual report is called Energy Efficiency Trends Analysis. There are dozens of tables illustrating trends in energy consumption expressed in energy per passenger km (passengers) or energy per tonne km (freight).

=== French environmental calculator ===
The environmental calculator of the French environment and energy agency (ADEME) published in 2007 using data from 2005 enables one to compare the different means of transport as regards the CO_{2} emissions (in terms of carbon dioxide equivalent) as well as the consumption of primary energy. In the case of an electric vehicle, the ADEME makes the assumption that 2.58 toe as primary energy are necessary for producing one toe of electricity as end energy in France (see Embodied energy: In the energy field).

This computer tool devised by the ADEME shows the importance of public transport from an environmental point of view. It highlights the primary energy consumption as well as the CO_{2} emissions due to transport. Due to the relatively low environmental impact of radioactive waste, compared to that of fossil fuel combustion emissions, this is not a factor in the tool. Moreover, intermodal passenger transport is probably a key to sustainable transport, by allowing people to use less polluting means of transport.

=== German environmental costs ===
Deutsche Bahn calculates the energy consumption of their various means of transportation.

Type	2018
Regional rail passenger transport (MJ/pkm)	0.85
Long-distance rail passenger transport (MJ/pkm)	0.25
Bus service (MJ/pkm)	1.14
Rail freight transport (MJ/tkm)	0.33
Road freight transport (MJ/tkm)	1.21
Air freight (MJ/tkm)	9.77
Ocean freight (MJ/tkm)	0.09

== Note - External costs not included above ==
To include all the energy used in transport, we would need to also include the external energy costs of producing, transporting and packaging of fuel (food or fossil fuel or electricity), the energy incurred in disposing of exhaust waste, and the energy costs of manufacturing the vehicle. For example, a human walking requires little or no special equipment while automobiles require a great deal of energy to produce and have relatively short product lifespans.

However, these external costs are independent of the energy cost per distance travelled, and can vary greatly for a particular vehicle depending on its lifetime, how often it is used and how it is energized over its lifetime. Thus this article's numbers include none of these external factors.

== See also ==
- ACEA agreement
- Alternative fuel vehicle
- Brake-specific fuel consumption
- Car speed and energy consumption
- Corporate average fuel economy (CAFE)
- Emission standard
- Fuel economy in automobiles
- Fuel-management systems
- Gas-guzzler
- Gasoline gallon equivalent
- Life-cycle assessment
- Marine fuel management
- Thrust-specific fuel consumption
- Vehicular metrics
- Von Kármán–Gabrielli diagram - What Price Speed?
- Transport
- Transport ecology
- Speed record
