= Spritmonitor =

German website

- Available in: German, English, French, Spanish
- Owner: Fisch und Fischl GmbH
- Website: www.spritmonitor.de
- Registration: Optional
- Users: 880,000
- Launched: January 2001

Spritmonitor is a German website that collects and delivers information about the fuel consumption and electric energy consumption of vehicles under real-life conditions. The database is provided by the users of the website themselves (crowdsourcing) who log the fuel-ups and charge-ups of their vehicles in the system.

== History ==
The website was created by Thomas Fischl and Dominik Fisch as a side project to their study of computer science at the University of Passau, Germany in 2001. Initially, the project was known under the name „Consumption Tables“ and was renamed to „Spritmonitor“ after a testing phase („Sprit“ is in Germany colloquial speech for fuel). The website is operated and owned by the Fisch und Fischl GmbH company which was founded in 2008.

== Functions ==
Spritmonitor offers two main functions:

First, it is possible for a car owner to log and track fuel up data and all vehicle-based expenses in the system. Based on this data many different analyses can be performed (e.g., fuel consumption depending on season, kind of fuel, used tires, etc.). The system supports conventional gasoline and diesel internal combustion vehicles, bivalent vehicles powered by liquefied petroleum gas or compressed natural gas as well as electric vehicles.

Second, the data base entries of Spritmonitor users can be viewed and analysed by others. Thereby, future car owners do not only have to rely on the fuel consumption published by car manufacturers but they can also get information about the-to-be-expected real-life fuel consumption of a vehicle before buying it.

Spritmonitor can be used on the road with the corresponding iPhone-, Android-, and Windows Phone-Apps as well as with the mobile version of the website. There is also an API (application programming interface) available which can be used to connect external applications to Spritmonitor.

== Use in scientific studies and tests ==
The Spritmonitor data base has reached such a significance in size and quality that it can be used in scientific studies. The ICCT uses the data set in its annual report “From Laboratory To Road” as well as Transport and Environment in its studies “Mind The Gap” and “How clean are electric cars?”. Also the Deutsche Umwelthilfe refers to Spritmonitor in its publication “Verbrauchsabweichungen in Deutschland und den USA”.

Besides those scientific studies, the Spritmonitor data is also used in vehicles tests of different media. The German consumer organisation Stiftung Warentest also references Spritmonitor in their guide to buying used cars.

== Figures ==
The Spritmonitor data base contains over 1,3 million vehicles of 880,000 users. All the users together logged over 56 million fuel-ups which correspond to a driven distance of 28 billion kilometres.
