= Bivalve (disambiguation) =

A bivalve is a marine or freshwater mollusc with a shell composed of two valves.

Bivalve may also refer to the following places in the United States:

- Bivalve, Maryland
- Bivalve, New Jersey
- Bivalve, unincorporated community in Marin County, California

== See also ==
- Bivalent (disambiguation)
