= Bivalent (engine) =

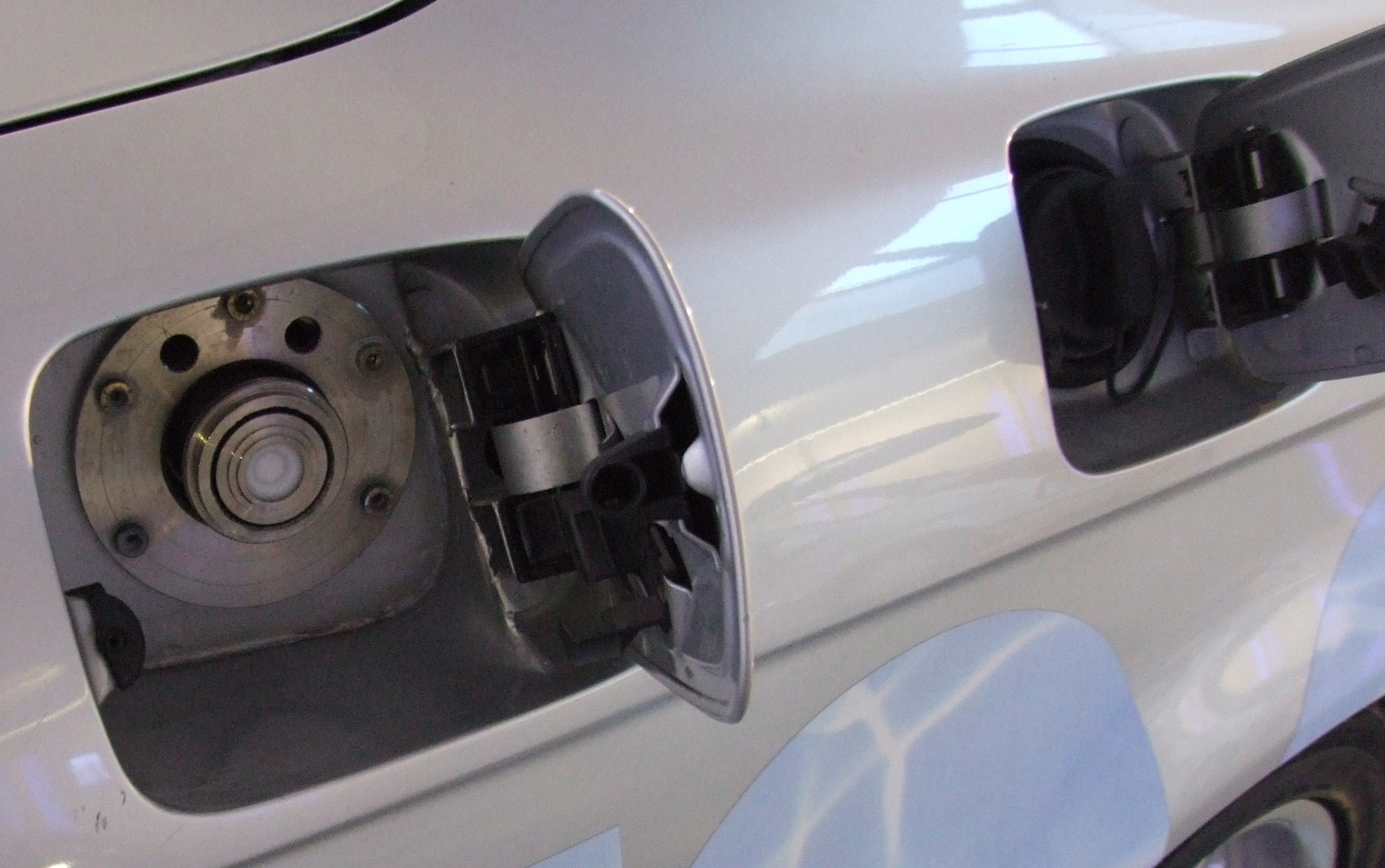
Left filler neck of a BMW for hydrogen, right filler neck for gasoline/petrol, Museum Autovision, Altlußheim, Germany

A bivalent engine is an engine that can use two different types of fuel. Examples are petroleum/CNG and petroleum/LPG engines, which are widely available in the European passenger vehicle aftermarket.

== Types ==
=== Alcohol and petroleum ===
Engines that can use either alcohol (often produced as a biofuel) or standard gasoline are variants of flex fuel vehicles. Such vehicles are in production and commonly available for sale in the United States and other countries.

=== Compressed or liquefied natural gas and petroleum ===
Compressed natural gas (CNG) is made by compressing methane to store it at high pressures. Liquefied natural gas (LNG) is made and stored cryogenically, much like liquid hydrogen. The physical properties of natural gas require the compression ratio of the engine to be higher than in normal internal combustion engines, and the higher compression makes for greater efficiency. Natural gas also has a higher octane rating, so it can be burned at a higher temperature, reducing engine knock, and the fuel can be produced without complicated refinement processes. Since little unburned carbon is produced in the combustion of natural gas, the engine and oil are kept much cleaner than would be the case if gasoline alone was being burned, and the engine's life is thus increased. Aftermarket kits are available to convert vehicles to run on LNG or CNG and gasoline. In the United States, natural gas is cheaper than gasoline. Still, CNG at typical pressures requires more frequent refueling because it contains only a quarter of the energy per unit volume of gasoline, whereas LNG contains only 80%.

=== Liquefied petroleum gas and petroleum ===
Liquefied petroleum gas (LPG) is a mixture of several hydrocarbons, mainly propane, butane, and ethane. The gas mixes readily with air, allowing for more complete combustion. The fuel costs less than regular gasoline, but LPG has lower energy per unit volume, so its fuel economy and efficiency are lower. LPG gives a longer engine life due to its clean-burning characteristics. The main difference between these vehicles and others is in their fuel storage systems. LPG is a gas at room temperature, but a liquid when pressurized (the required pressure varies according to the composition of the mixture). It is usually stored at around 10 bar. One drawback is that LPG fuel tanks are much heavier than conventional ones, hence two tanks would be needed, which would increase the vehicle's weight. Many automobile manufacturers make vehicles that run on LPG and gasoline. Some say that LPG is the least environmentally friendly alternative fuel because it is derived from fossil fuels so that greenhouse gases will inevitably be released into the atmosphere.

=== Hydrogen and petroleum ===
Bivalent engines can also use hydrogen fuel, as demonstrated by the BMW Hydrogen 7 using a bivalent V12 H7 Series engine. The engine itself is similar to a regular gasoline combustion engine, except for the fuel injection system. When a BMW Hydrogen 7 is running in gasoline mode, the fuel is injected directly into the cylinders, but when the vehicle is running on hydrogen, the fuel is injected into the intake manifold. BMW claims the Hydrogen 7 is the "world's first production-ready hydrogen vehicle", although only 100 total vehicles have been produced, and no more are planned to be produced.

== Future ==
Reduction of greenhouse gas emissions and preservation of natural resources are becoming increasingly important to people worldwide. Many countries have regulations on the fuel economy of newly manufactured vehicles, and many governments offer tax breaks for vehicle manufacturers that use clean-burning fuels. Vehicle manufacturers are thus motivated to develop new internal combustion engine technologies. The bivalent engine allows for an easier transition from fossil fuels to alternative fuels. The technology is advancing and there is increasing demand for more efficient and cleaner burning engines.

=== Hydrogen fuel ===
==== Gaseous hydrogen ====
Hydrogen is being researched as a fuel for vehicles because it produces no carbon dioxide emissions. If hydrogen fuel becomes more popular, it has the potential to be less expensive than other fuels, if low-cost production via electrolysis can be implemented. Hydrogen can be used and created in fuel cells to power electric motors or burnt directly in combustion engines. BMW has developed a bivalent internal combustion engine that can switch between petroleum and liquid hydrogen fuels. In gaseous form, hydrogen is difficult to store and has a low volumetric energy density. It can be produced in many different ways, but many of the methods produce carbon dioxide. The most promising method is electrolysis. The safety of the hydrogen storage tanks in the event of an accident has been investigated, and various tests show that they do not present any problems. When used as a fuel, hydrogen has a wide range of flammability and low ignition energy. These properties allow hydrogen to be burned using a wide range of air-fuel mixtures, but problems arise with premature ignition. Crankcase ventilation is very important when burning hydrogen, because of the low ignition energy. Proper ventilation is needed to prevent ignition in the crankcase and the formation of water in the engine oil. Hydrogen and natural gas are very similar fuels, so the differences between the components needed to burn them are trivial, and interoperable systems are easily made.

==== Liquid hydrogen ====
The volumetric energy density can be increased if hydrogen is stored as a cryogenic liquid. Liquid hydrogen provides almost a third as much energy per unit volume as gasoline.

Liquid hydrogen fuel has some disadvantages. The technology is very new and the infrastructure for liquid hydrogen filling stations is currently very limited. Many of the processes commonly used in creating the fuel give off greenhouse gases, and the hydrogen produced is usually derived from finite resources. The storage of the liquid hydrogen is a major problem. Since the boiling point of liquid hydrogen is very low (−252.88 °C), it is difficult to keep the fuel cold enough to maintain its liquid form. When it warms, it evaporates. The pressure in the fuel tank then increases, and some gas must be released. Release valves are installed in these vehicles so that the pressure in the tank does not get too high, but a small amount of fuel is lost.

== See also ==
- Flexible-fuel vehicle
- Hybrid vehicle
- CleanEnergy
- Natural gas vehicle
