= Jorn Madslien =

British journalist

Jorn Madslien (Jørn Madslien) born 11 March 1967 is a journalist who has worked for BBC News Online and other BBC News outlets.

Madslien is a former features editor for the business and economics pages on the BBC News website. In addition he specialises on reporting internationally on the energy industry, aerospace and defence, as well as the motor industry.

In December 2010, Madslien was the big winner at the annual Guild of Motoring Writers Awards, where he collected three prizes. Madslien collected the journalist of the year prize for his work raising the profile of the motor industry. He was also named business writer of year and new media writer of the year. He narrowly missed out on a fourth prize after being highly commendend in the environmental writer category.

In 2007, Madslien was on the Business Journalist of the Year shortlist for his early reporting on biofuel and its advantages and shortcomings.

Prior to joining the BBC in 2000, Madslien founded and ran the television production company The Media Syndicate, making current affairs documentaries on behalf of broadcasters in many countries.

Among his productions are films about the sub-culture producing Neo-Nazi White Power music in Sweden, the challenges facing the indigenous Sami people in the High North region and Russian prostitutes working across the border in Northern Norway during the 1990s.

Also during the 1990s, Jorn worked as a television reporter/presenter for European Business News, a Dow Jones, TV-channel that was later merged with CNBC Europe. Jorn has also written for the financial press in London and New York, including publications by Euromoney Institutional Investor PLC and he is a contributing editor of books on financial derivatives.
