= Hyundai Initium =

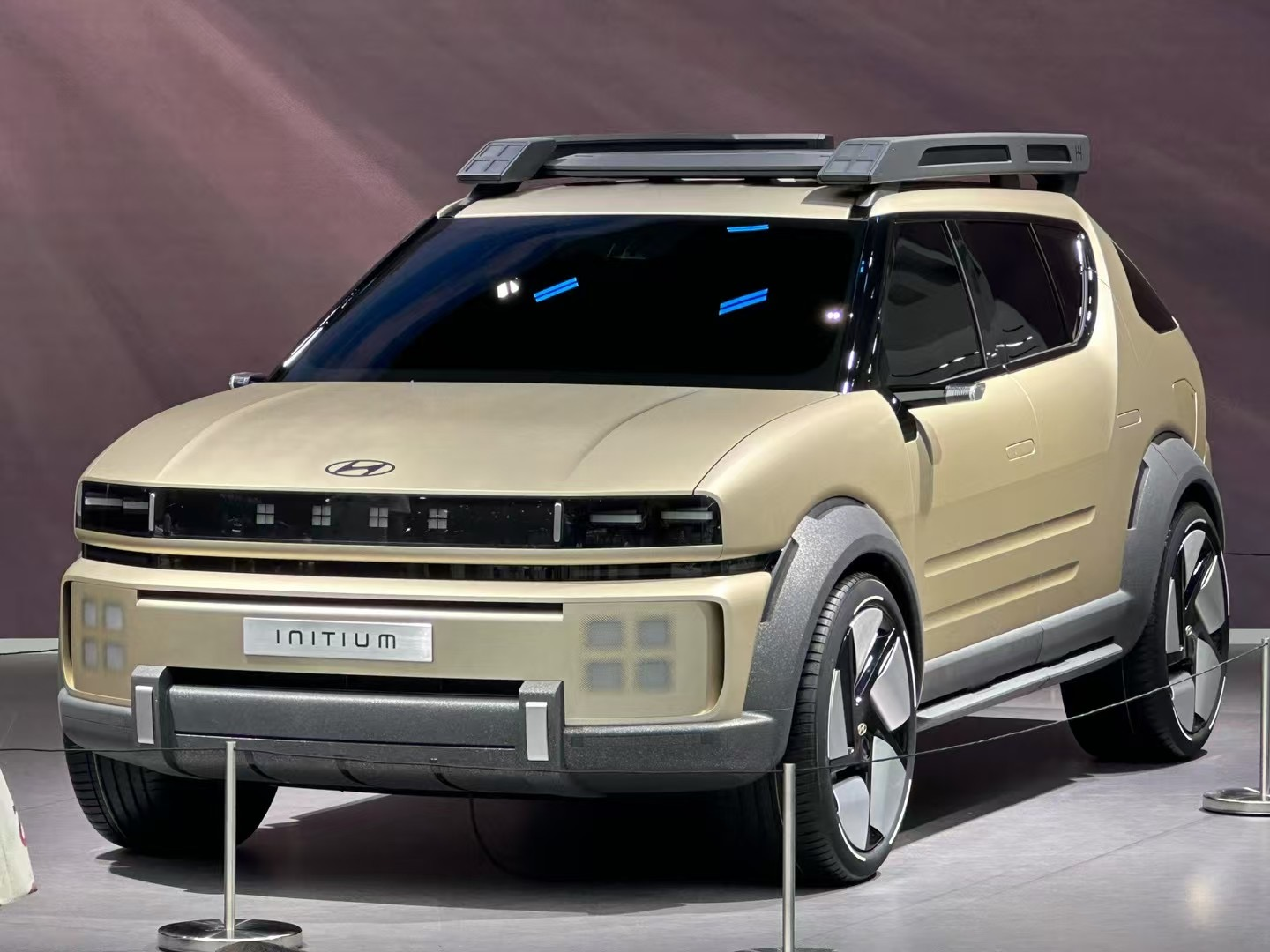

Overview
- Manufacturer: Hyundai

Body and chassis
- Class: Concept car

Chronology
- Successor: Hyundai Nexo (second generation) (production model)

The Hyundai Initium (Korean: 현대 이니시움) is a concept model of a fuel cell electric vehicle by Hyundai. It was unveiled in Goyang, South Korea in October 2024 and at the 2024 LA Auto Show. The production version of the concept model has been revealed as the second-generation Hyundai Nexo.

== Overview ==
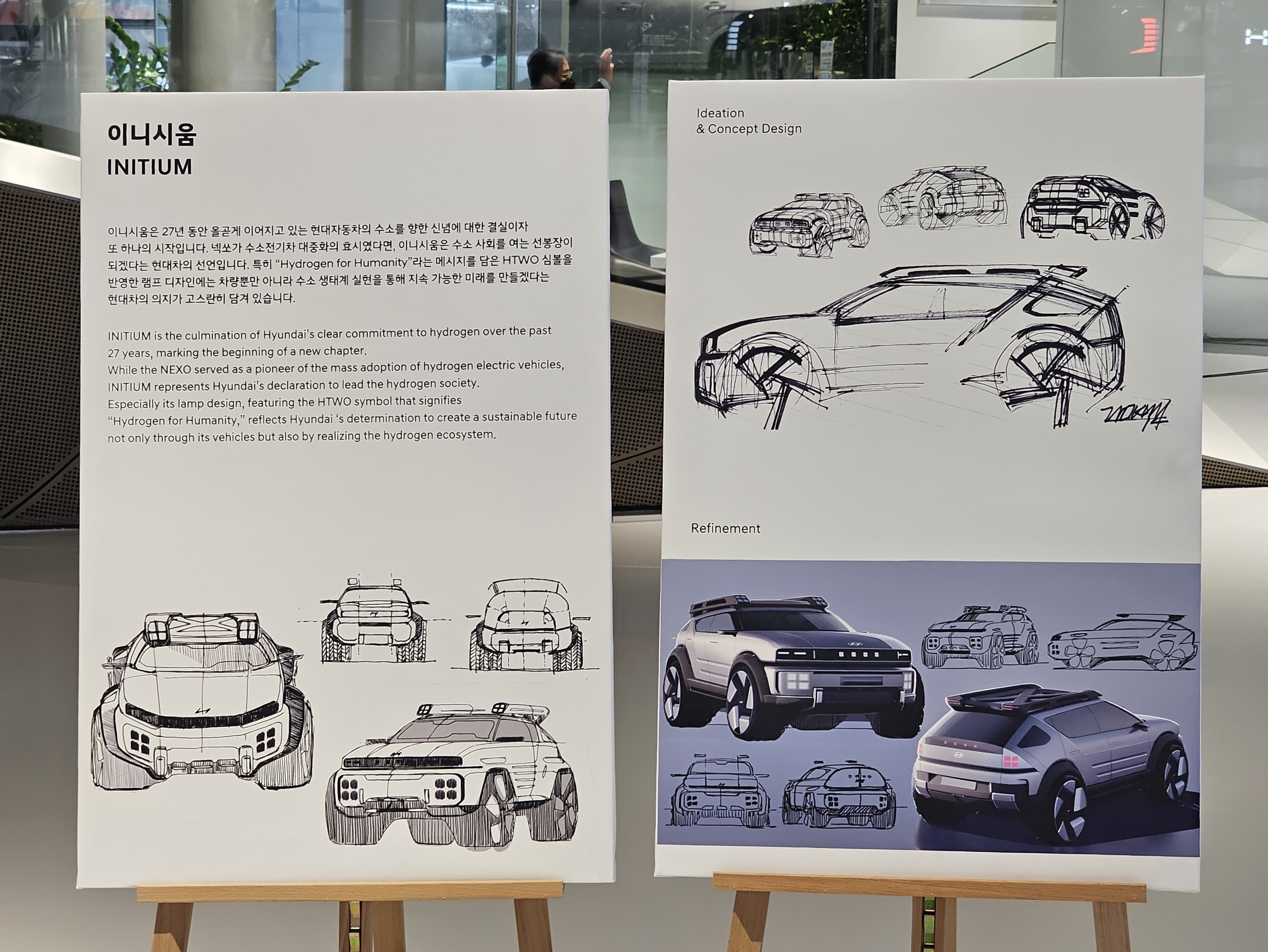
Design sketch

Initium was unveiled at the Clearly Committed: Upright Belief event held at Hyundai Motorstudio Goyang on October 31, 2024. In November, it was unveiled for the first time in North America at the 2024 LA Auto Show. Initium means beginning/first in Latin and carries the meaning of a pioneer in opening a hydrogen society.

Hyundai reflects the company's new design language, Art of Steel, and emphasizes the natural elasticity of steel, the strength and beauty of the material, and the pure yet strong nature of hydrogen, he explained. A lamp design that embodies the symbol of Hyundai Motor Group's hydrogen value chain business brand, HTWO, was applied. Simon Rossby, Senior Vice President and Head of Hyundai Design Center, said that this vehicle embodies the company's efforts in hydrogen mobility and sustainability.

== Gallery ==
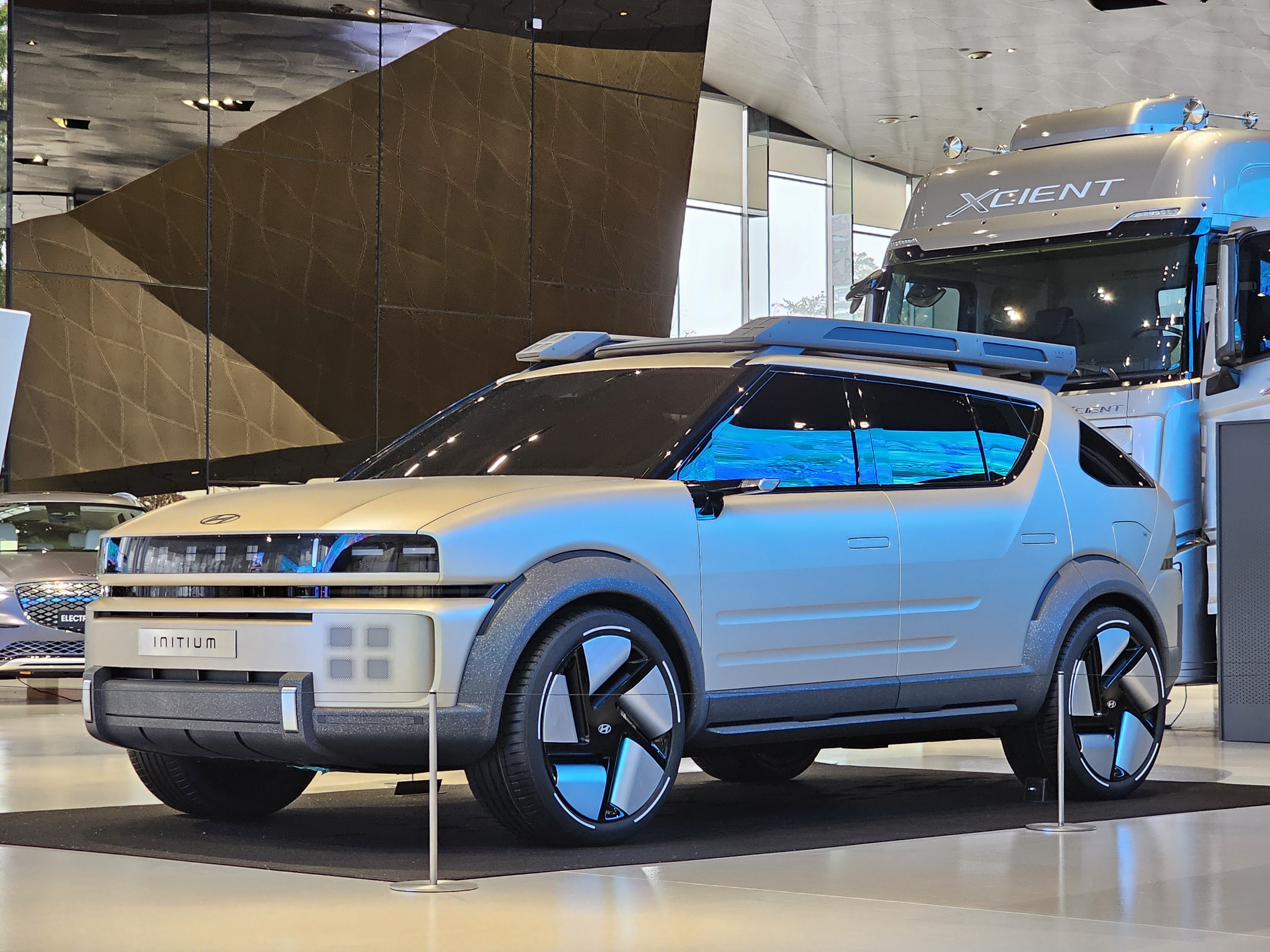
Front view

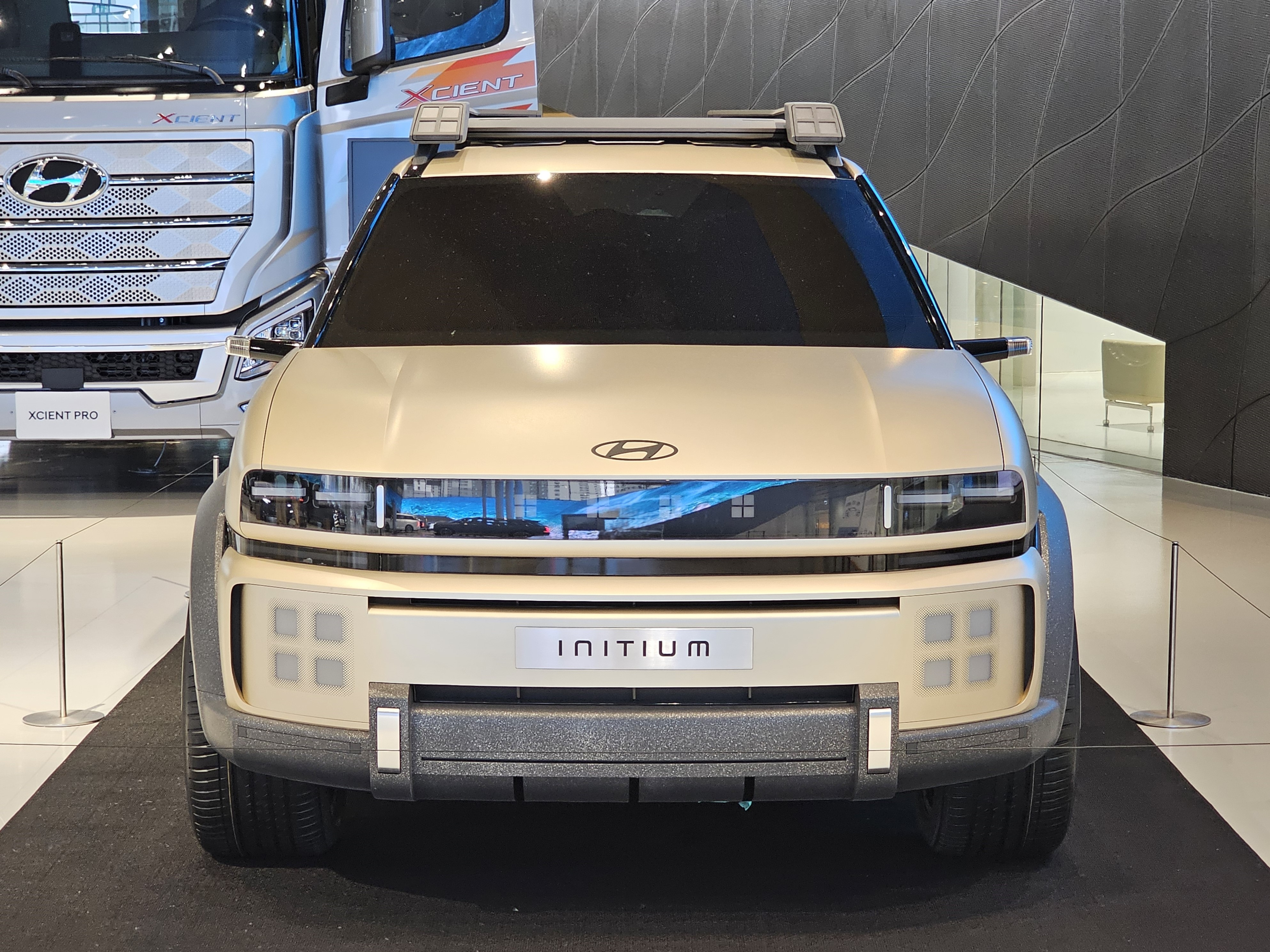
Front View

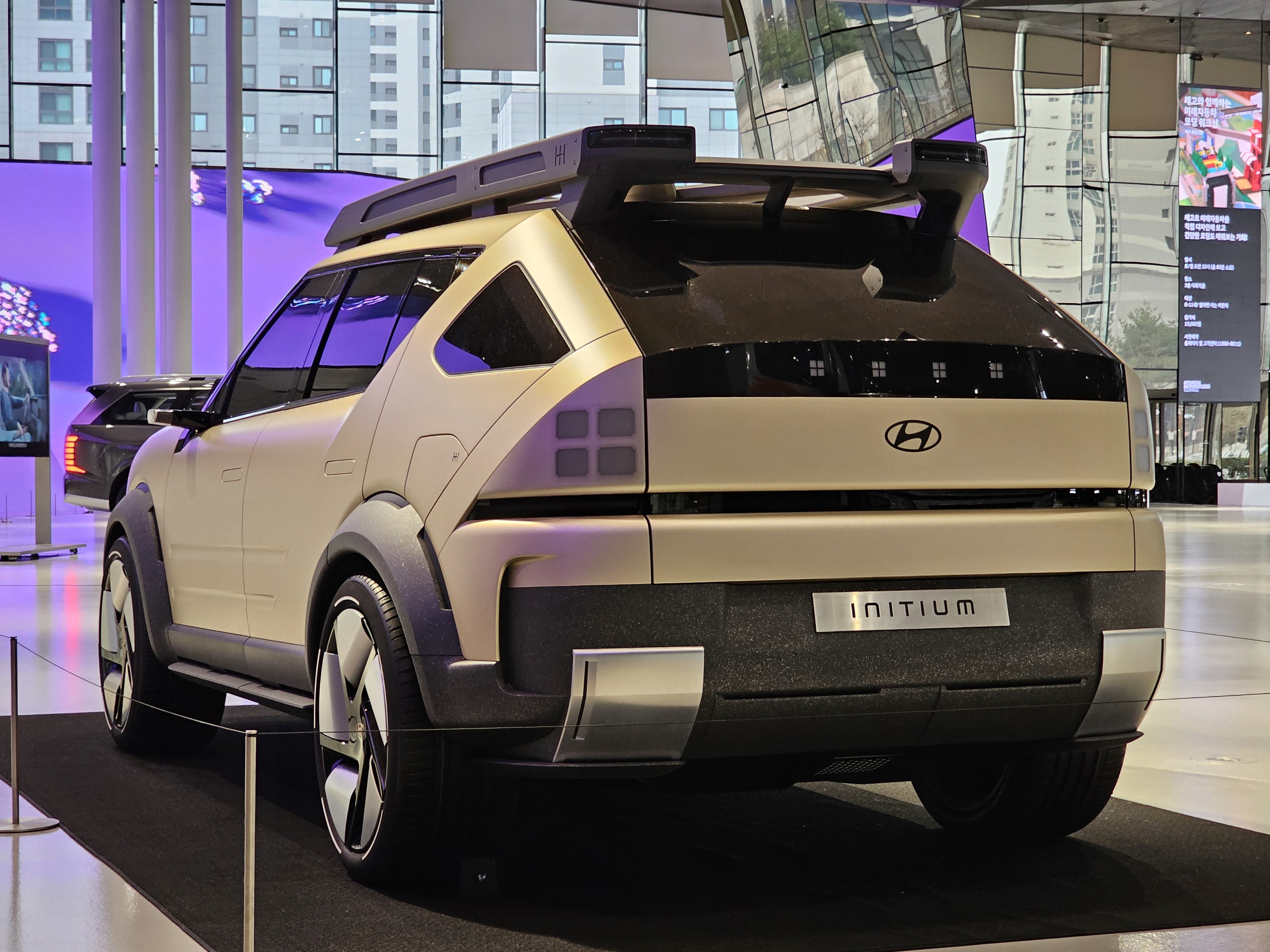
Rear view

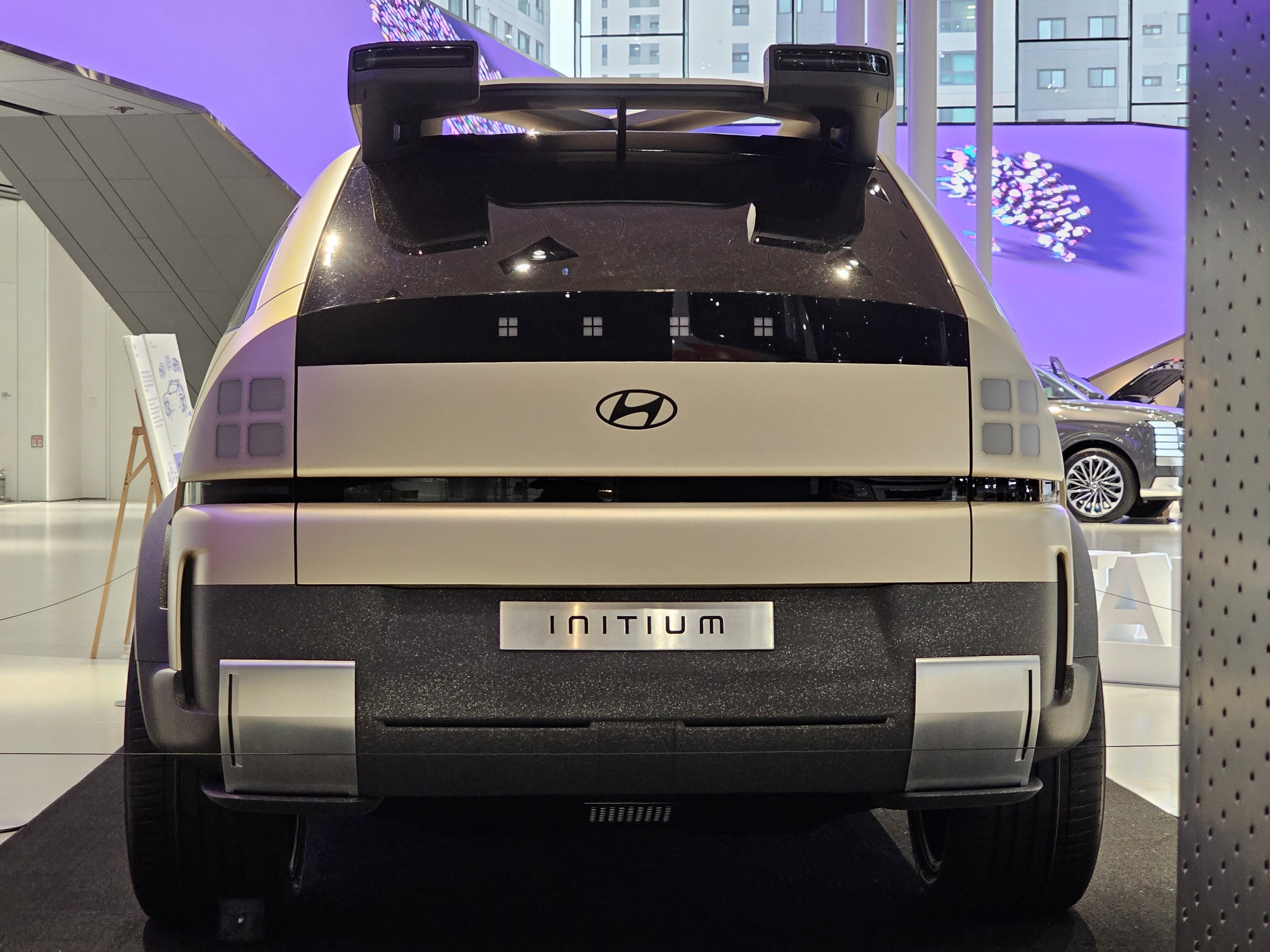
Rear view

== See also ==
- Hyundai Nexo
- Hyundai Intrado
