= Hyundai Intrado =

SUV concept car made by Hyundai

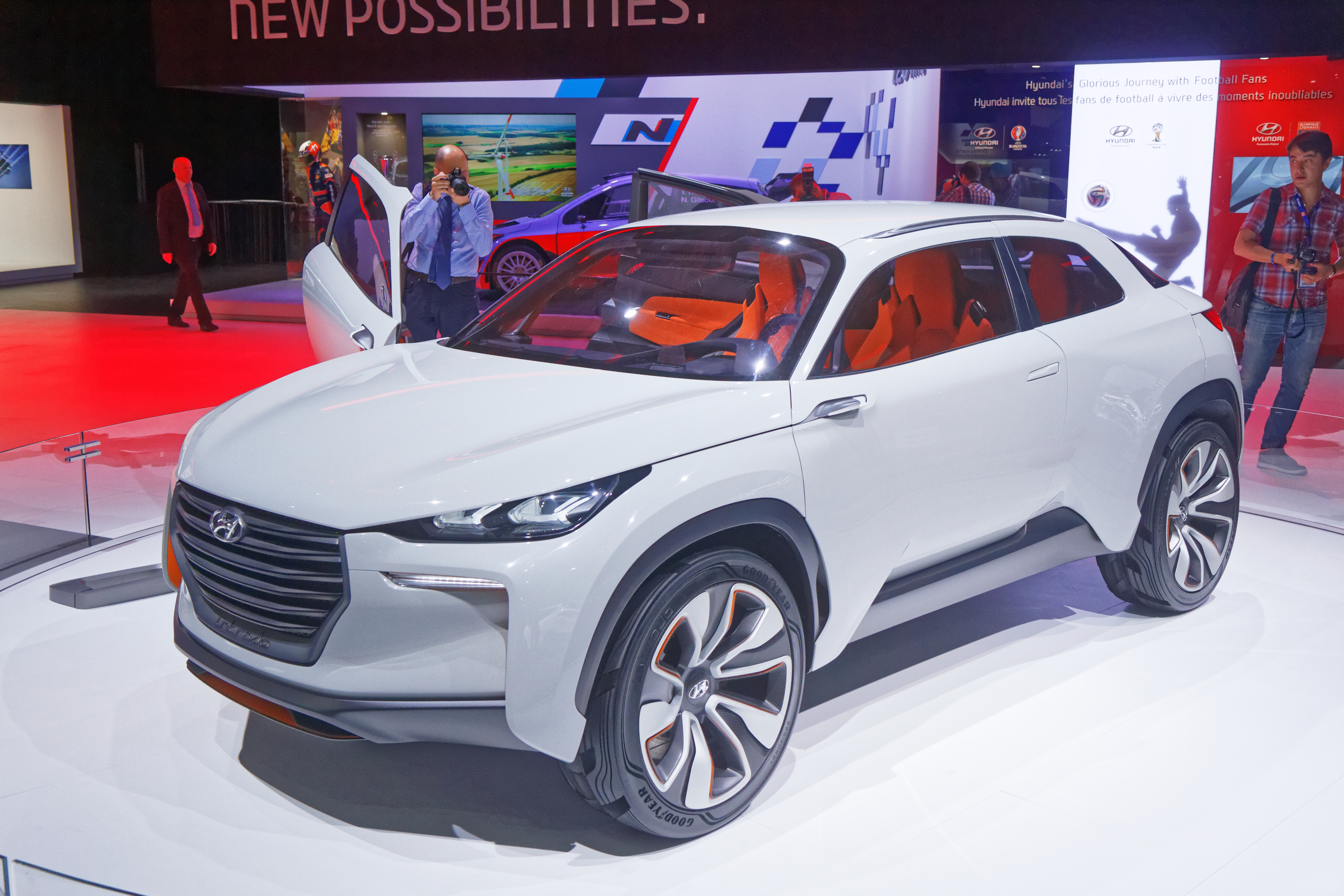
- Hyundai Intrado at the 2014 Mondil de Paris

Overview
- Manufacturer: Hyundai
- Production: 2014
- Designer: Peter Schreyer (design director)

Body and chassis
- Class: Concept car

The Hyundai Intrado is a mini SUV concept car made by Korean company Hyundai. It is powered by a hydrogen fuel cell powertrain with a 36-kWH lithium-ion battery. It has a range of about 370 mi (600 km) on a single fill up.

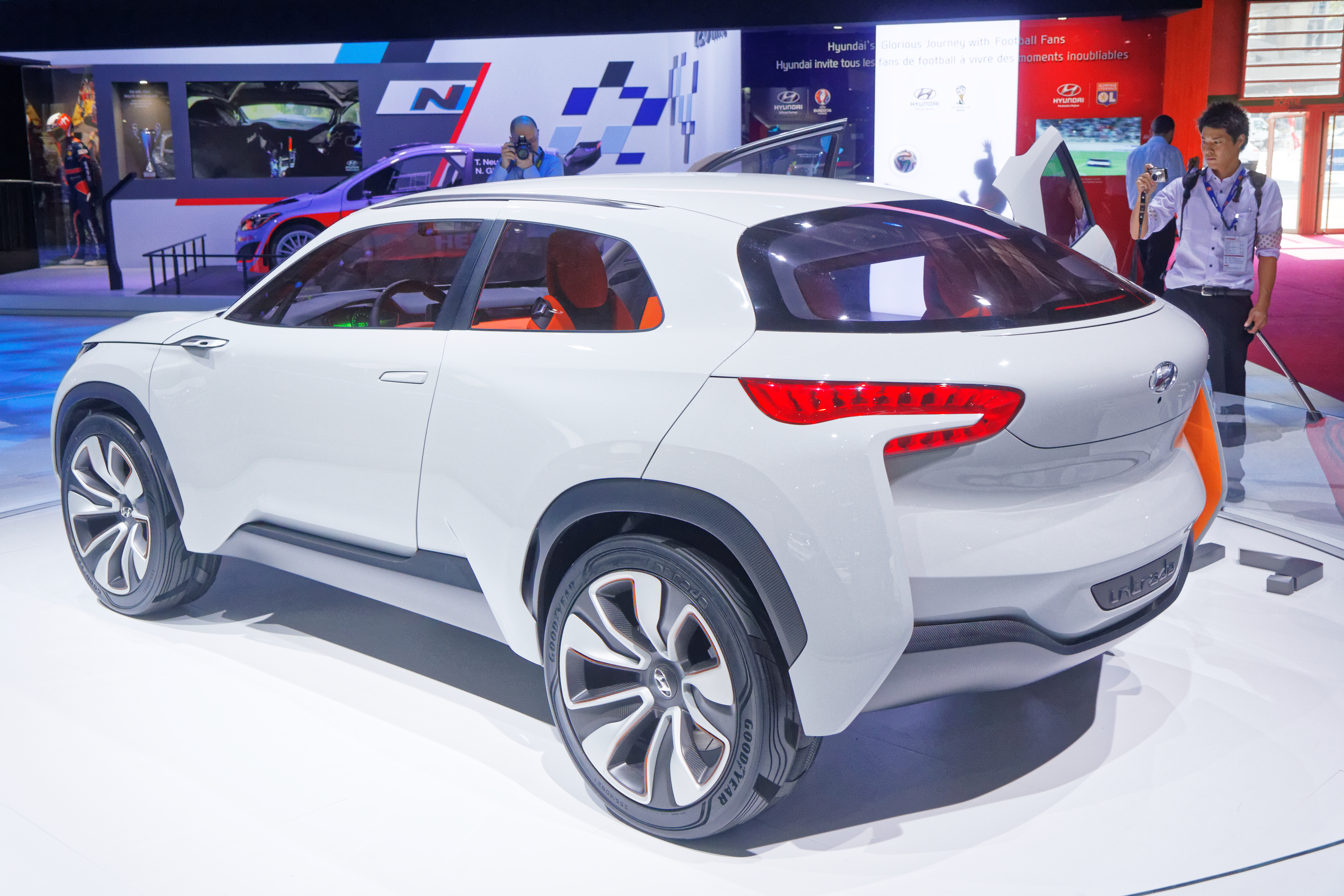
Rear view

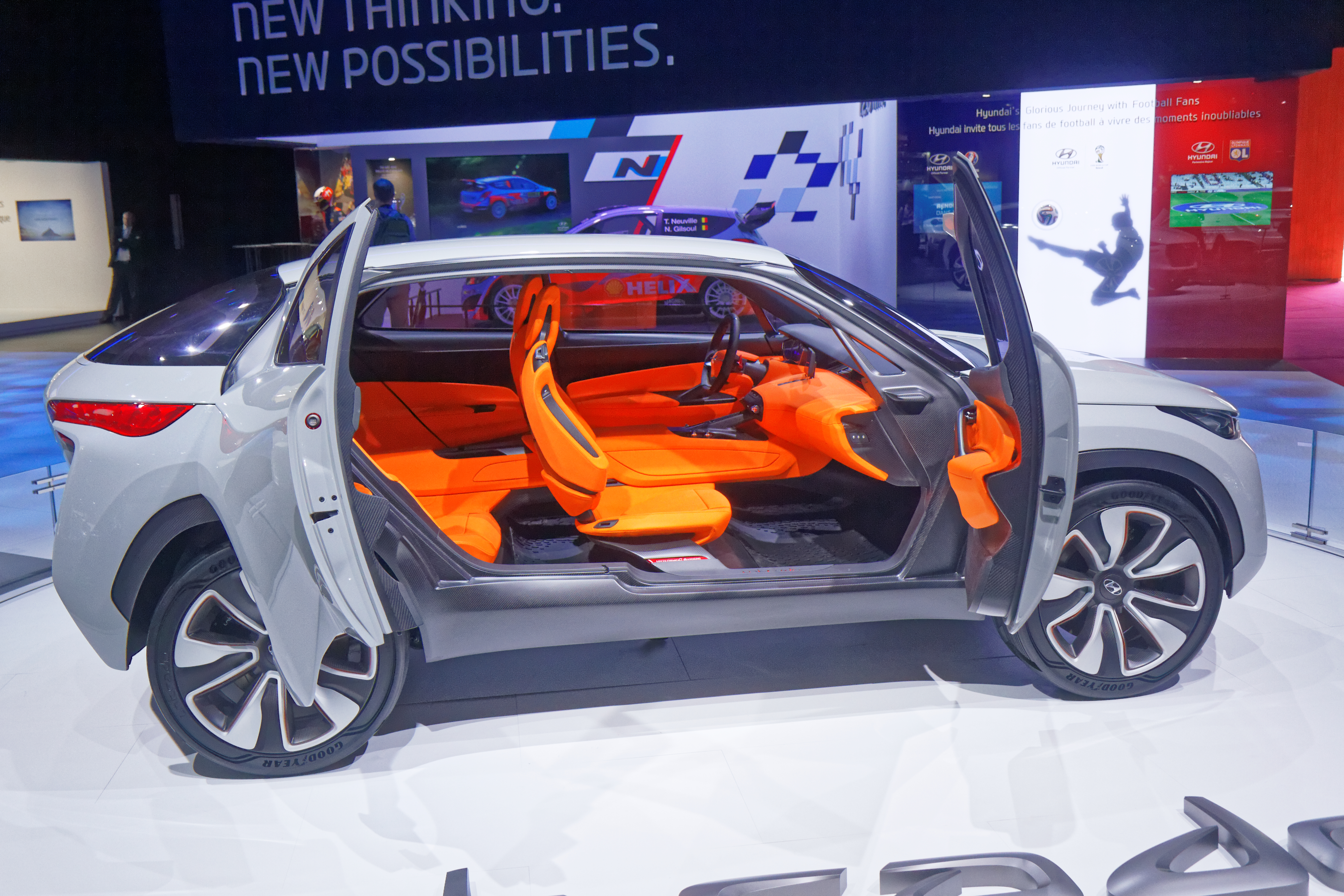
View of the interior with the doors open

== See also ==
- Hyundai Tucson (ix35) FCEV
- Hyundai Nexo
- Hyundai Initium
