= Hyundai Nexo =

Hydrogen powered fuel cell crossover SUV

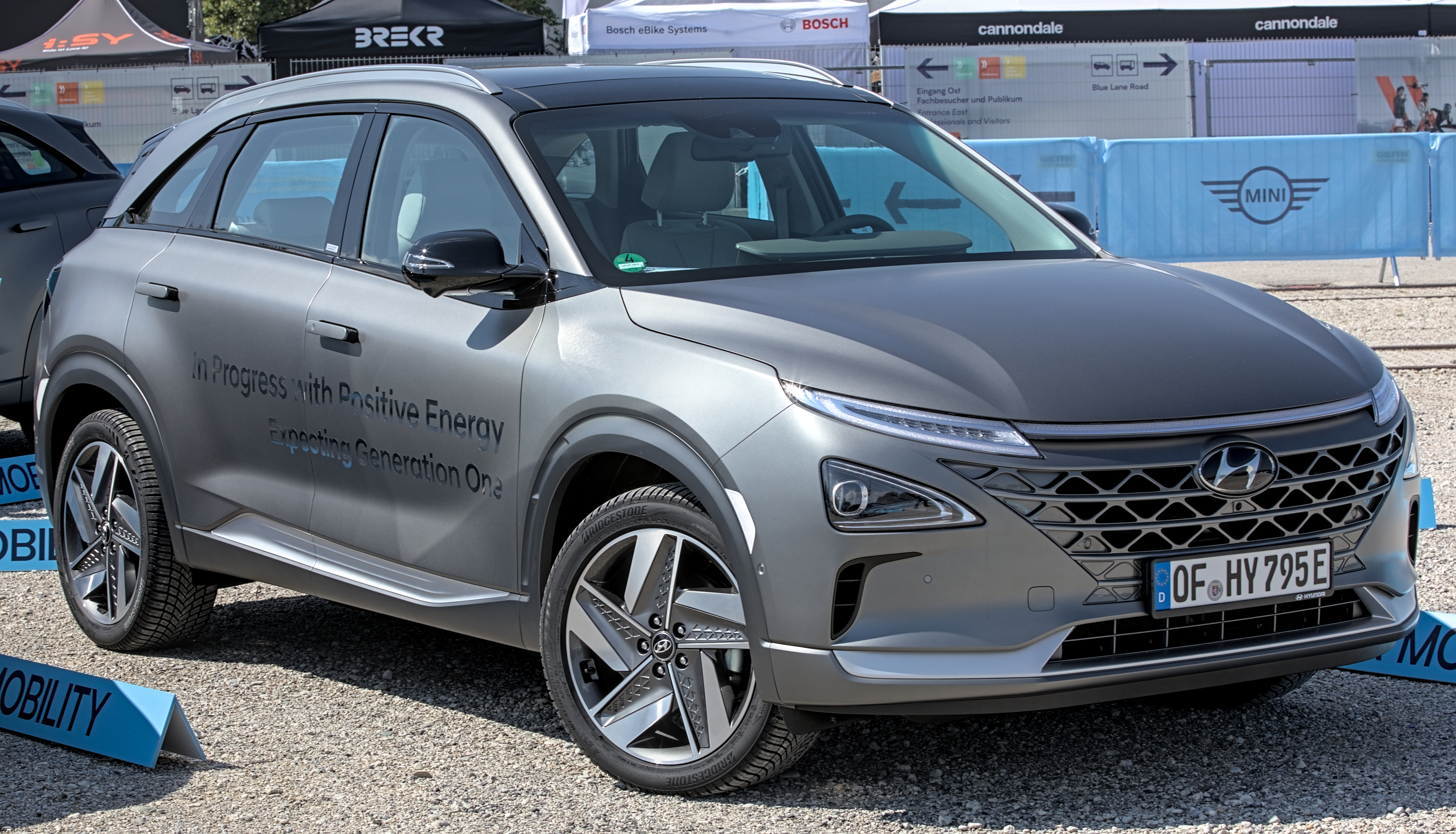
- First generation Nexo (FE)

Overview
- Manufacturer: Hyundai
- Production: 2018–present
- Model years: 2019–present

Body and chassis
- Class: Compact crossover SUV
- Body style: 5-door SUV
- Layout: Front-motor, front-wheel-drive

Chronology
- Predecessor: Hyundai ix35 FCEV

The Hyundai Nexo (Korean: 현대 넥쏘) is a hydrogen fuel cell powered crossover SUV that was revealed at the 2018 Consumer Electronics Show on 8 January 2018. Replacing the Hyundai Tucson FCEV, the Nexo is the flagship for Hyundai's "eco car" portfolio. The car is named after the Danish city Nexø.

The Hyundai Nexo Blue has an EPA rated range of 611 km (380 mi). The Nexo Limited has a driving range of 570 km (350 mi) versus 470 km (290 mi) for the Tucson FCEV. The vehicle features three fuel tanks with a total capacity of 156 liters and 6.3 kg, versus 140 liters and 5.6 kg for the previous model. The Nexo has a 163 PS, 400 Nm electric motor, versus 135 PS and 300 Nm for the Tucson FCEV.

== First generation (FE; 2018) ==
First generation
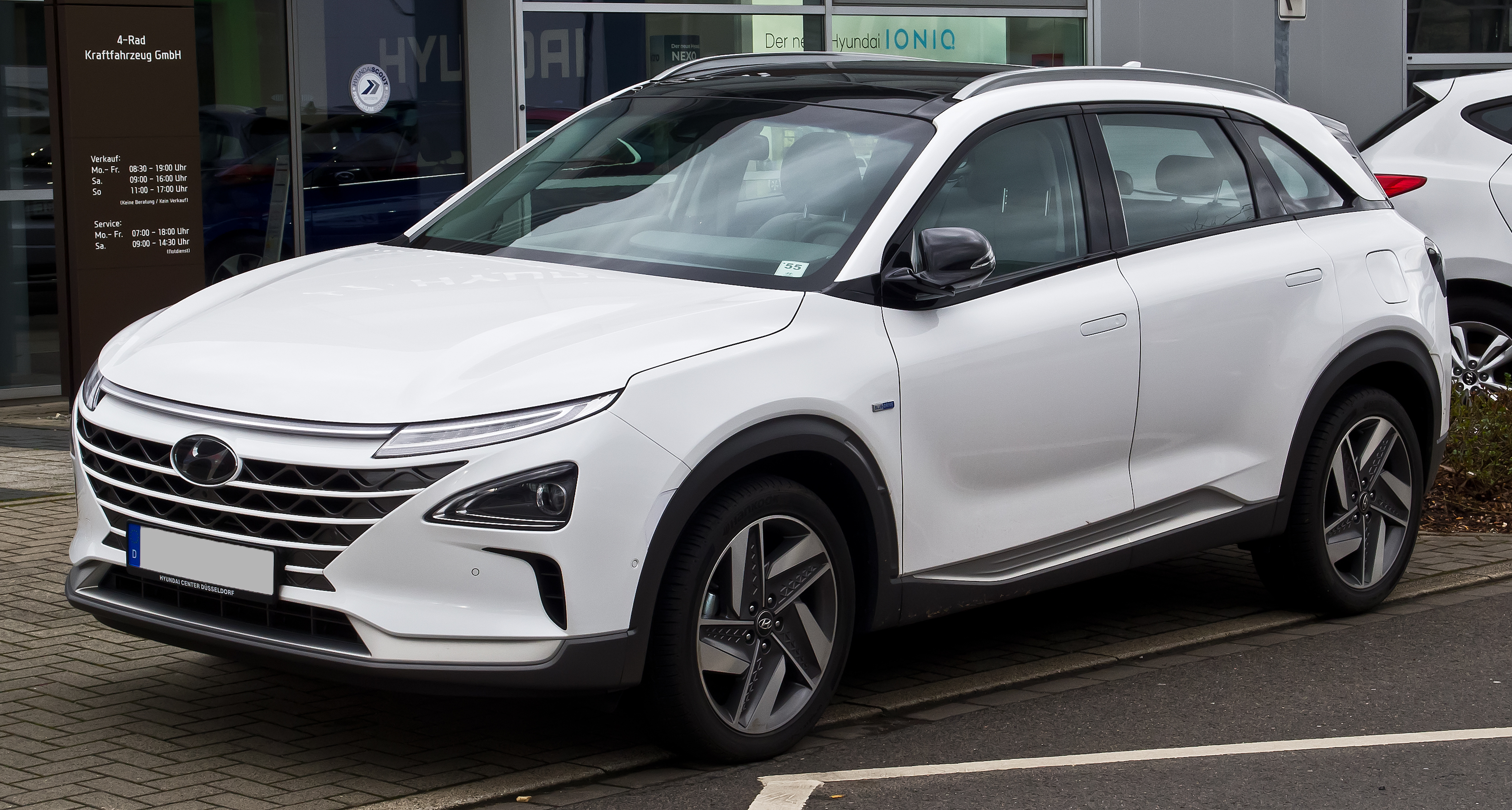

Overview
- Model code: FE
- Production: 2018–2025
- Model years: 2019–2025
- Assembly: South Korea: Ulsan (Ulsan Plant 5)
- Designer: Yong Jun Heo

Body and chassis
- Platform: Eco-Car platform
- Related: Hyundai Ioniq

Powertrain
- Electric motor: Fuel cell hydrogen-powered
- Power output: 113–120 kW (154–163 PS)
- Range: 354–380 mi (570–612 km) (EPA); 666 km (414 mi) (WLTP); 756 km (470 mi) (NEDC)

Dimensions
- Wheelbase: 2,790 mm (109.8 in)
- Length: 4,670 mm (183.9 in)
- Width: 1,860 mm (73.2 in)
- Height: 1,630–1,640 mm (64.2–64.6 in)
- Curb weight: 1,814–1,873 kg (3,999–4,129 lb)

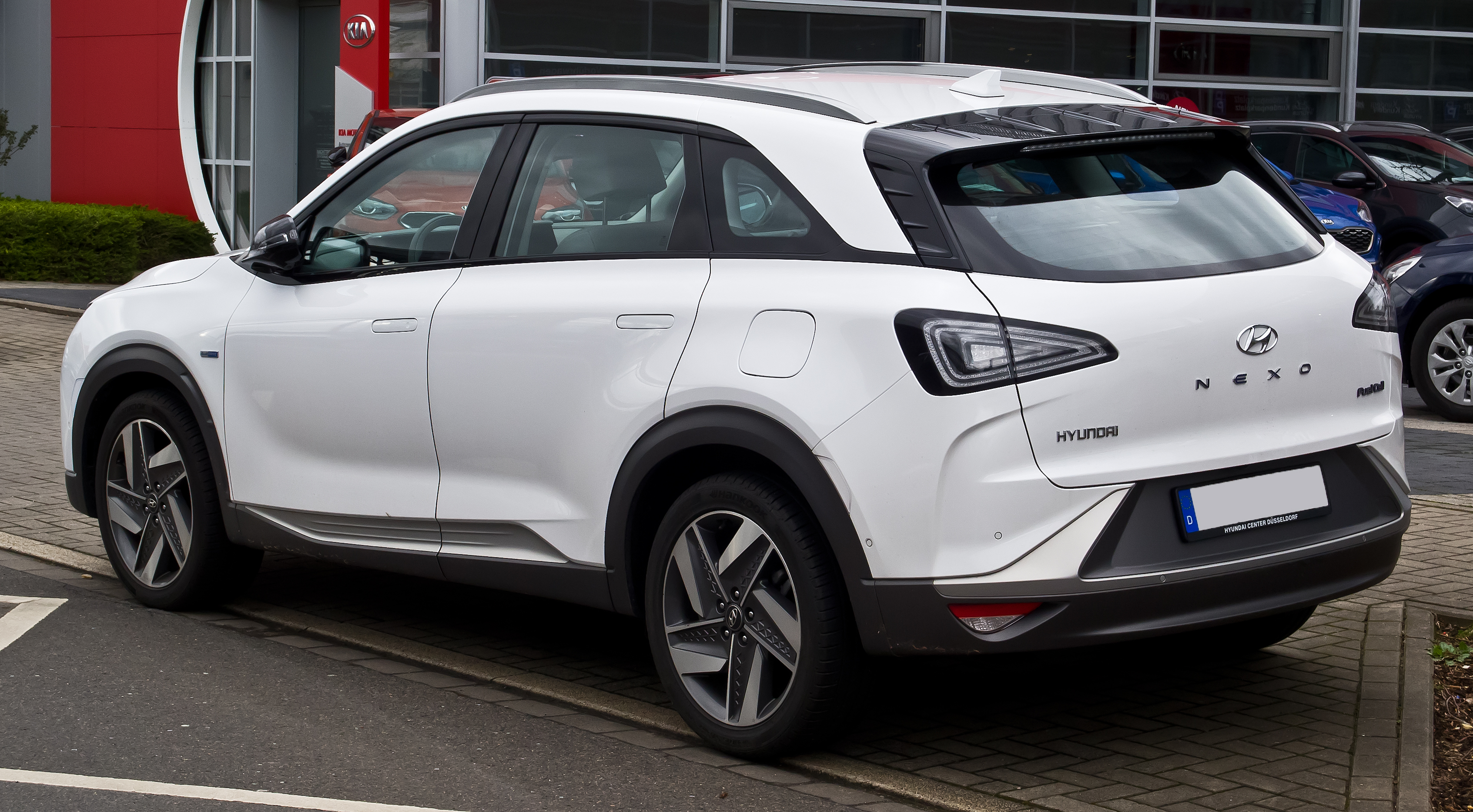
Rear view

The Nexo was released in South Korea in March 2018. The Nexo fuel cell components came with a 10-year or 160,000 km (99,000 mi) warranty. In October 2020, South Korean sales exceeded 10,000 vehicles with 727 sold in 2018, 4,194 sold in 2019 and 5,097 sold up to October 2020.

The first Nexo sold in the US in December 2018. The Nexo had earlier been unveiled to the media in October 2018 to be available only in California by the end of 2018. The Nexo was released in UK in March 2019. The Nexo was released in Australia in March 2021 on special order for lease becoming the first hydrogen fuel cell vehicle sold in Australia.

=== Assistance systems ===
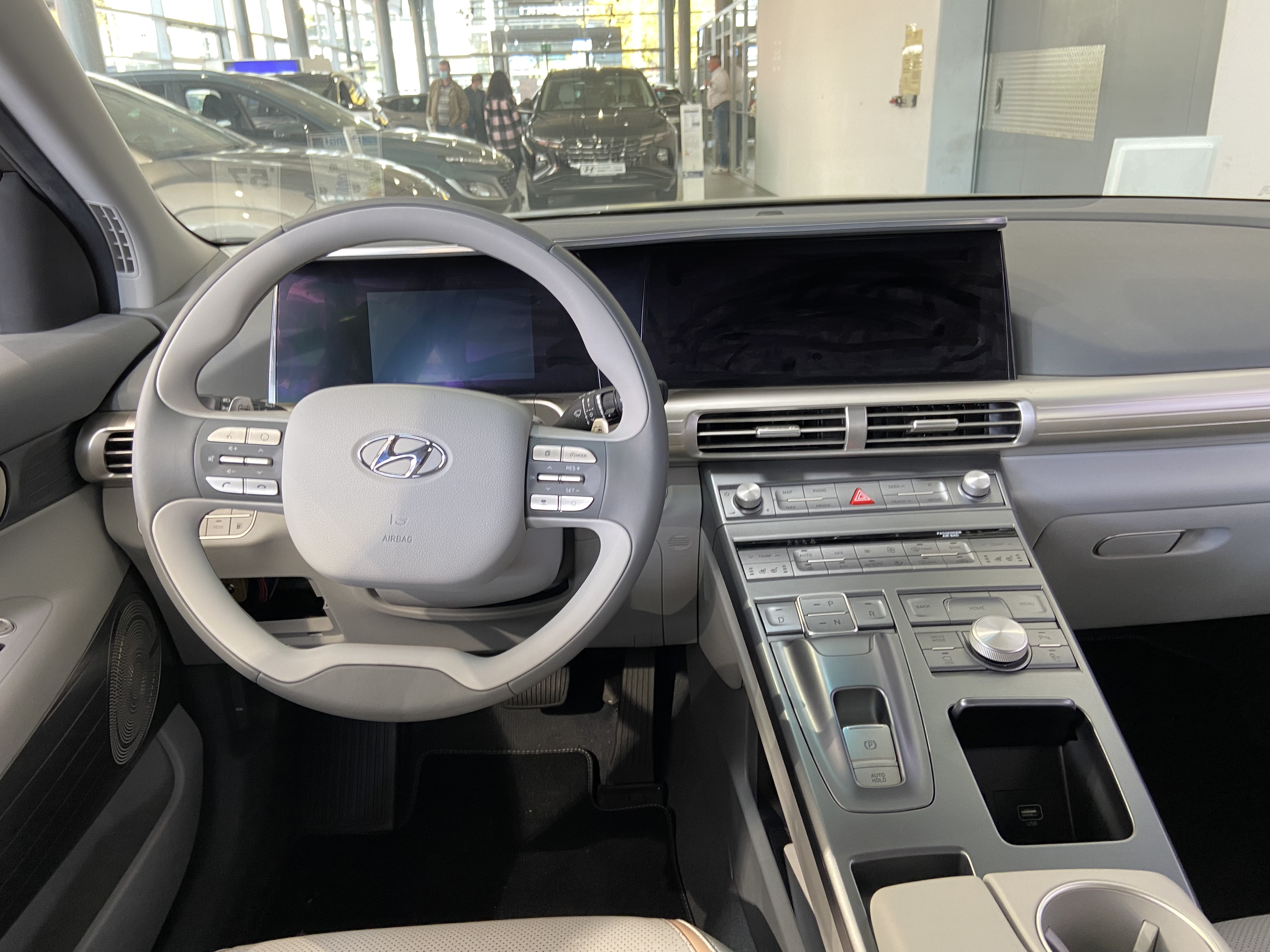
Cockpit

The Nexo also gets Hyundai's new assistance systems like the blind spot view monitor, lane following assist, and highway driving assist. Using surround view monitors, the blind spot view monitor provides the driver with a clear view of both the sides and the back of the car to facilitate a safer lane-change maneuver. Hyundai claims that it is the first carmaker to incorporate such technology.

The lane follow assist, as the name suggests, helps the car maintain its lane autonomously by detecting lane markings or road edges and automatically giving mild steering inputs to be in the center of the lane.

The highway assistant monitors the driving environment using sensors and can automatically adjust the speed of the vehicle to maintain a safe drive. Hyundai has also incorporated a remote parking assistant in the Nexo, which can autonomously park and retrieve the vehicle.

=== Air purification ===
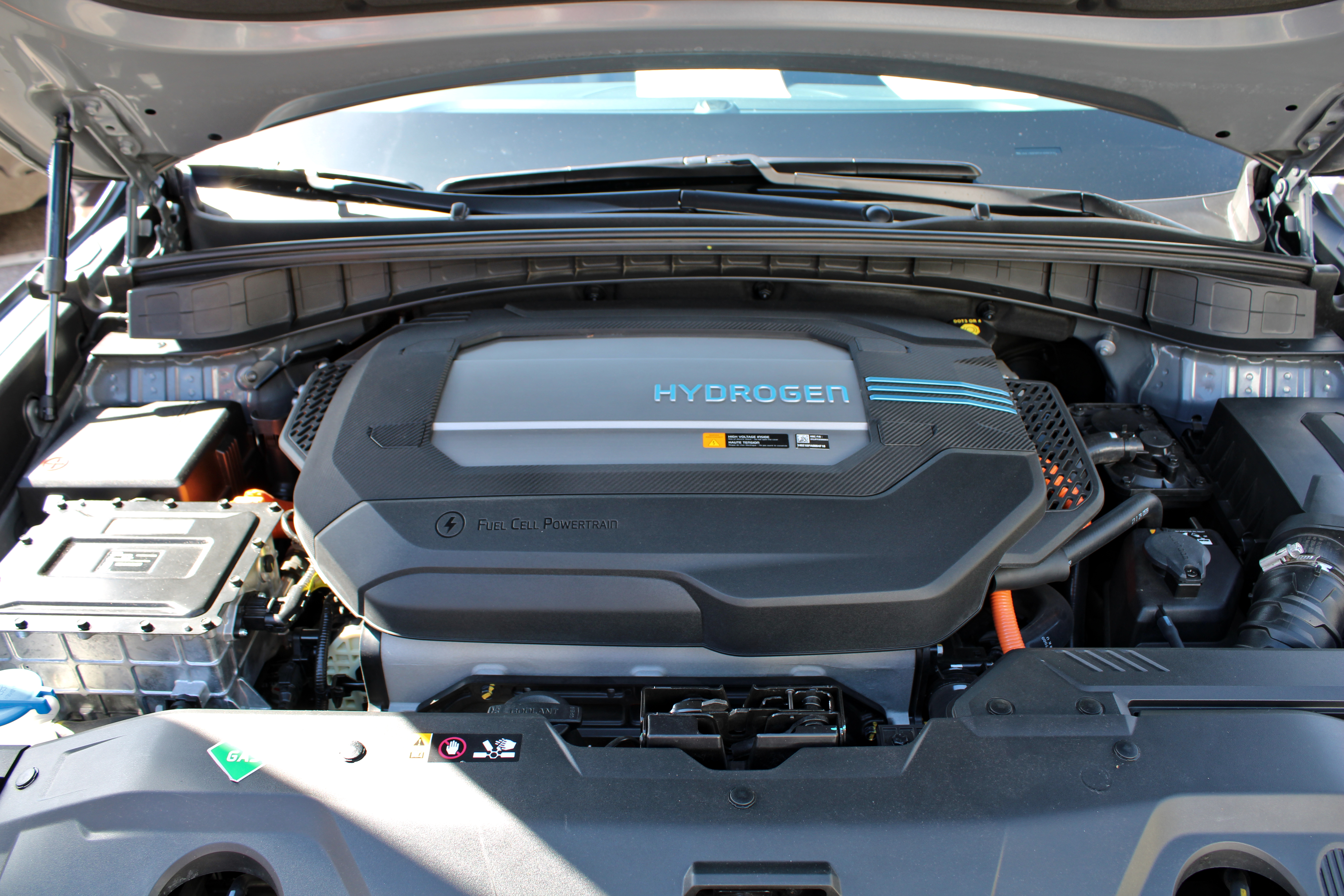
Powertrain

The Nexo is fitted with an advanced air purification system that removes 100% of the damaging PM2.5 fine particulate matter from polluted air using a three-step filtration process. Hyundai's marketing of this feature was deemed to be misleading by the British Advertising Standards Authority, as the car releases harmful pollutants through tyre and brake wear, with the advertising in question cited as an example of greenwashing by critics.

=== Fuel ===
The fuel is hydrogen gas stored in pressurized tanks. It reacts with atmospheric oxygen to yield electrical energy and water.

In a 2018 trial, researchers at Australia's Commonwealth Scientific and Industrial Research Organisation (CSIRO) successfully refuelled a Nexo with hydrogen separated from ammonia using a membrane technology.

=== Specifications ===
Powertrain
Type	Power	Torque	0–100 km/h (0–62 mph) (official)	Top speed
3x 52.2 L (11.5 imp gal; 13.8 US gal) hydrogen tank	113–120 kW (154–163 PS; 152–161 hp) at 3,000–4,600 rpm	40.3 kg⋅m (395 N⋅m; 291 lbf⋅ft)	9.2 s	179 km/h (111 mph)

=== Safety ===
The Nexo was awarded 5 stars by Euro NCAP in 2018.

ANCAP test results Hyundai Nexo (2018, aligned with Euro NCAP)
Test	Points	%
Overall:	5 /5 stars	
Adult occupant:	35.8	94%
Child occupant:	44	89%
Pedestrian:	32.3	67%
Safety assist:	10.4	80%

== Second generation (NH2; 2025) ==
Second generation
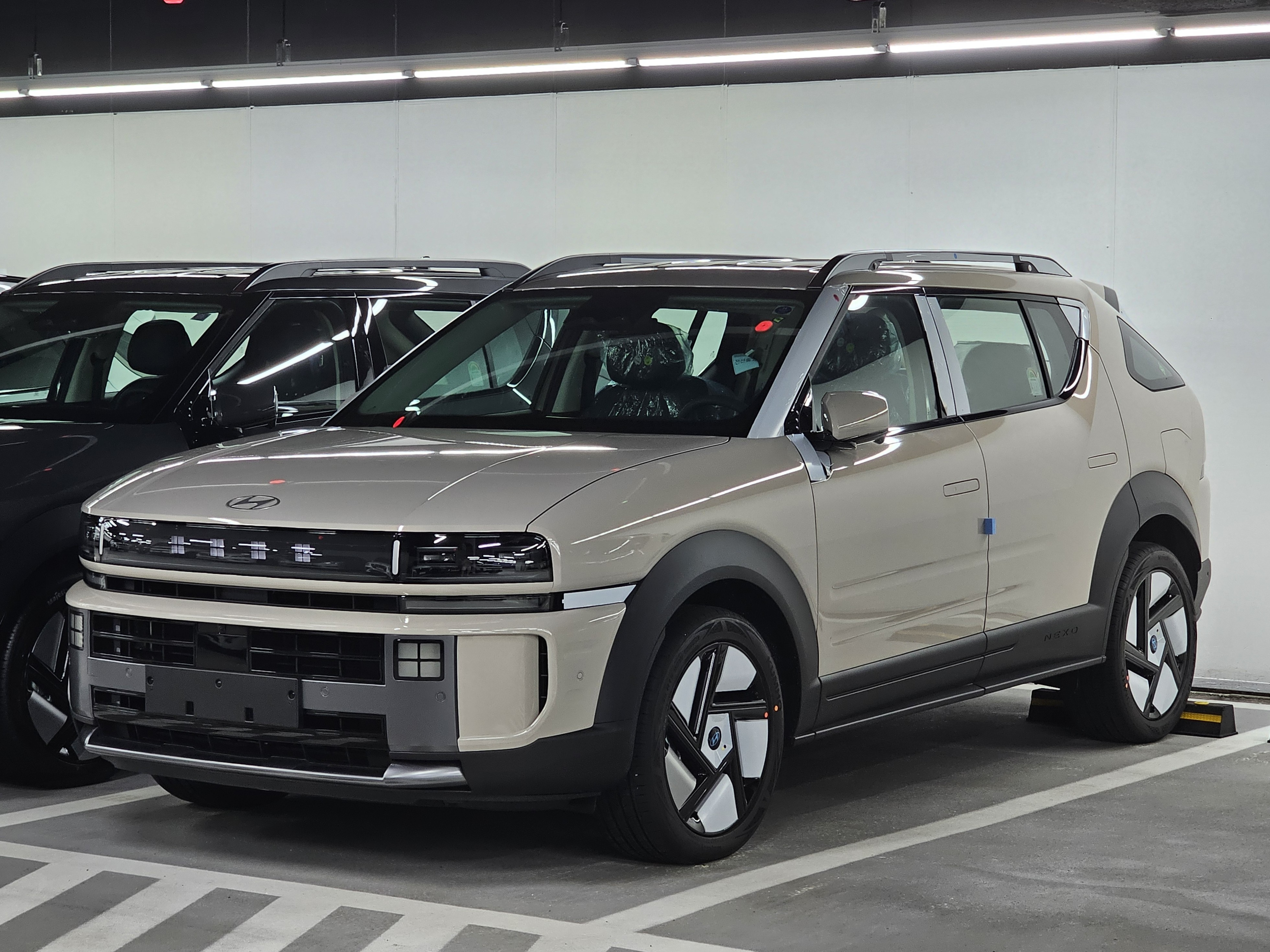

Overview
- Model code: NH2
- Production: 2025–present
- Assembly: South Korea: Ulsan (Ulsan Plant 5)

Powertrain
- Electric motor: Fuel cell hydrogen-powered
- Power output: 190 kW (258 PS; 255 hp)
- Battery: 2.64 kWh
- Range: 700 km (435 mi)

Dimensions
- Wheelbase: 2,790 mm (109.8 in)
- Length: 4,750 mm (187.0 in)
- Width: 1,865 mm (73.4 in)
- Height: 1,640–1,673 mm (64.6–65.9 in)

The second-generation Nexo was previewed as the Hyundai Initium concept on 31 October 2024. On 3 April 2025, the production version was revealed, being quite similar to the Initium concept.

The front DRL and rear combination lamp feature the HTWO lamp, which is a symbol symbolizing the molecular formula for hydrogen and Hyundai Motor Group's hydrogen business brand HTWO. A panoramic curved display and digital side mirrors were applied.

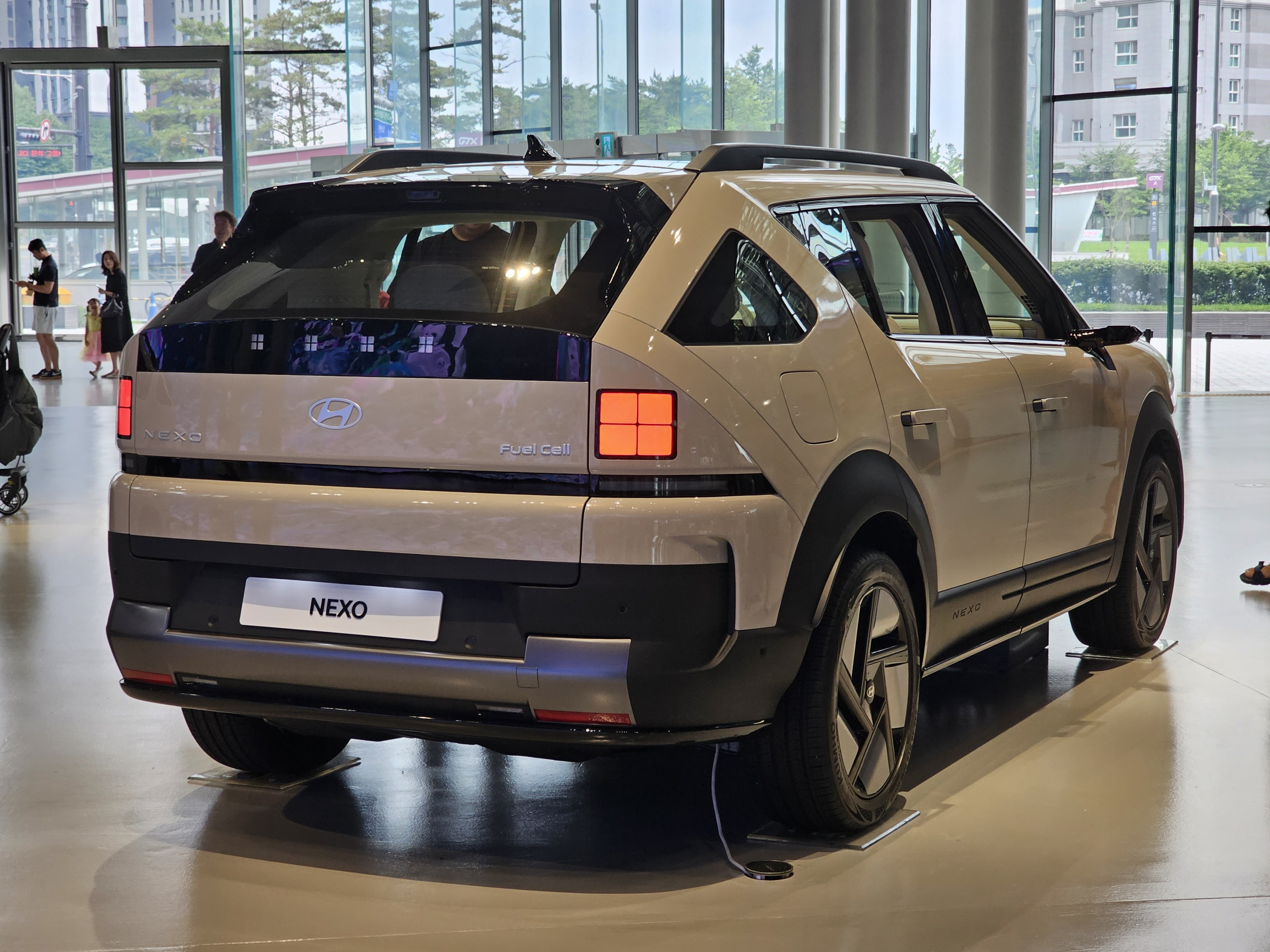
Rear view

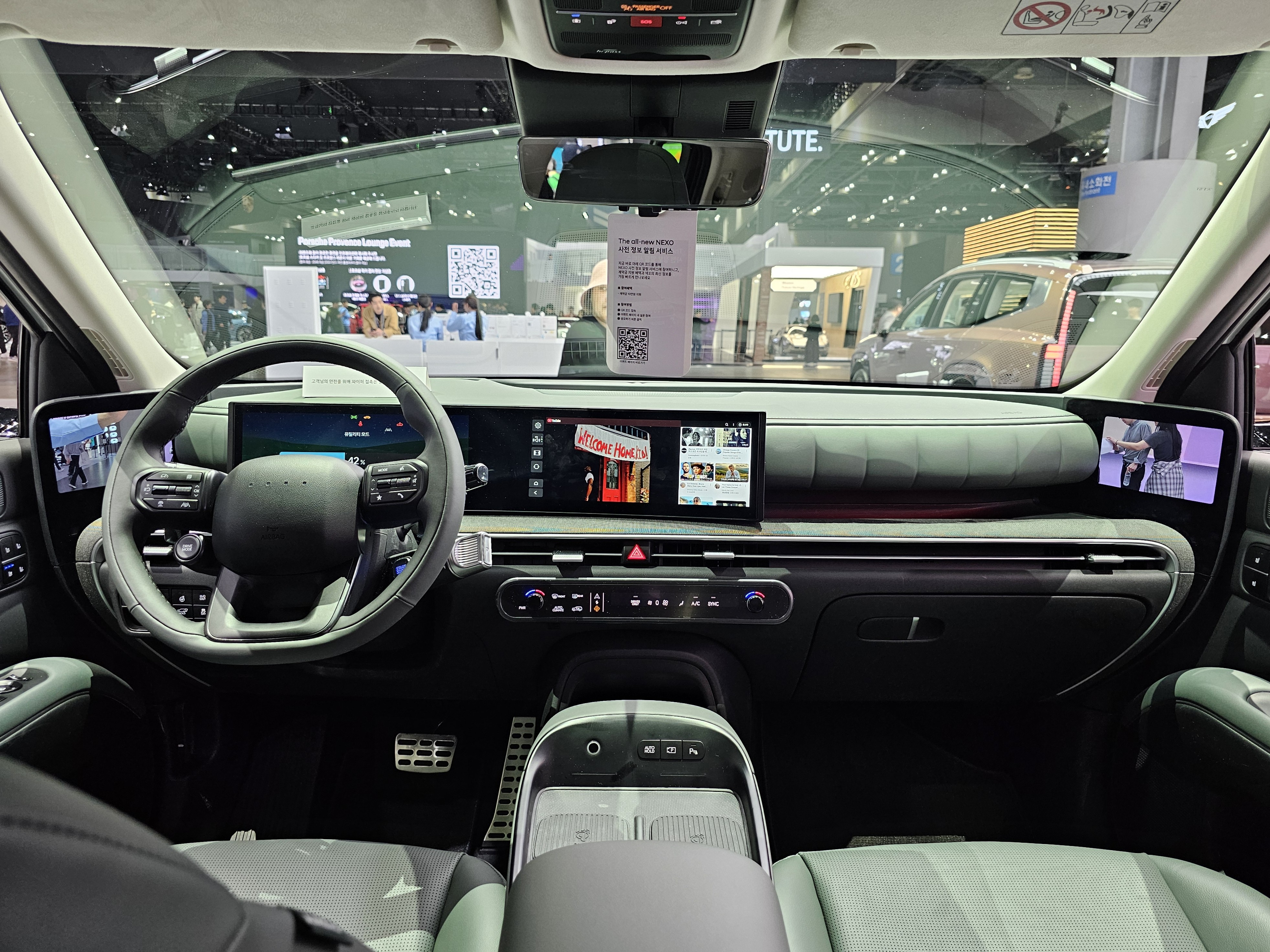
Interior

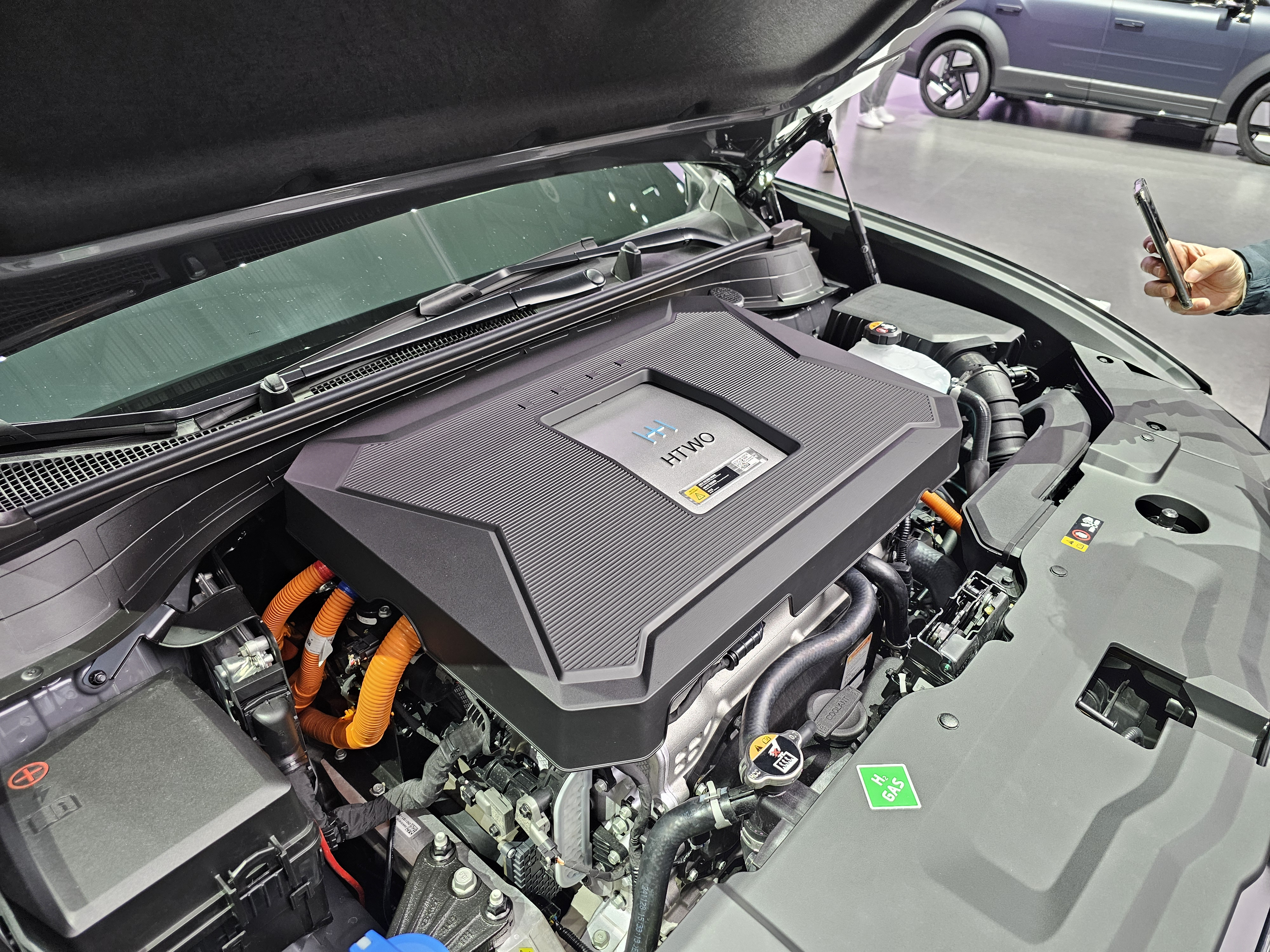
Fuel cell

=== Powertrain ===
Powertrain
Type	Power	Torque	0–100 km/h (0–62 mph) (official)	Top speed
3x 54.2 L (11.9 imp gal; 14.3 US gal) hydrogen tank	190 kW (258 PS; 255 hp)		7.8 s	179 km/h (111 mph)

=== Safety ===
Euro NCAP test results Hyundai Nexo, base trim (LHD) (2025)
Test	Points	%
Overall:	5 /5 stars	
Adult occupant:	36.3	90%
Child occupant:	42.0	85%
Pedestrian:	48.0	76%
Safety assist:	14.4	84%

== Sales ==
Calendar year	South Korea	U.S	Europe	Global
2018	727	8	92	949
2019	4,194	267	362	4,987
2020	5,786	208	468	6,781
2021	8,502	421	214	9,602
2022	10,164	408	572	10,527
2023	4,328	241	—N/a	4,552
2024	2,751	93	11	2,774

== See also ==
- List of fuel cell vehicles
- Hyundai Tucson (ix35) FCEV
- Hyundai Intrado (concept car)
