= Hyundai ix35 FCEV =

Hydrogen powered fuel cell crossover SUV

Hyundai ix35 Fuel Cell
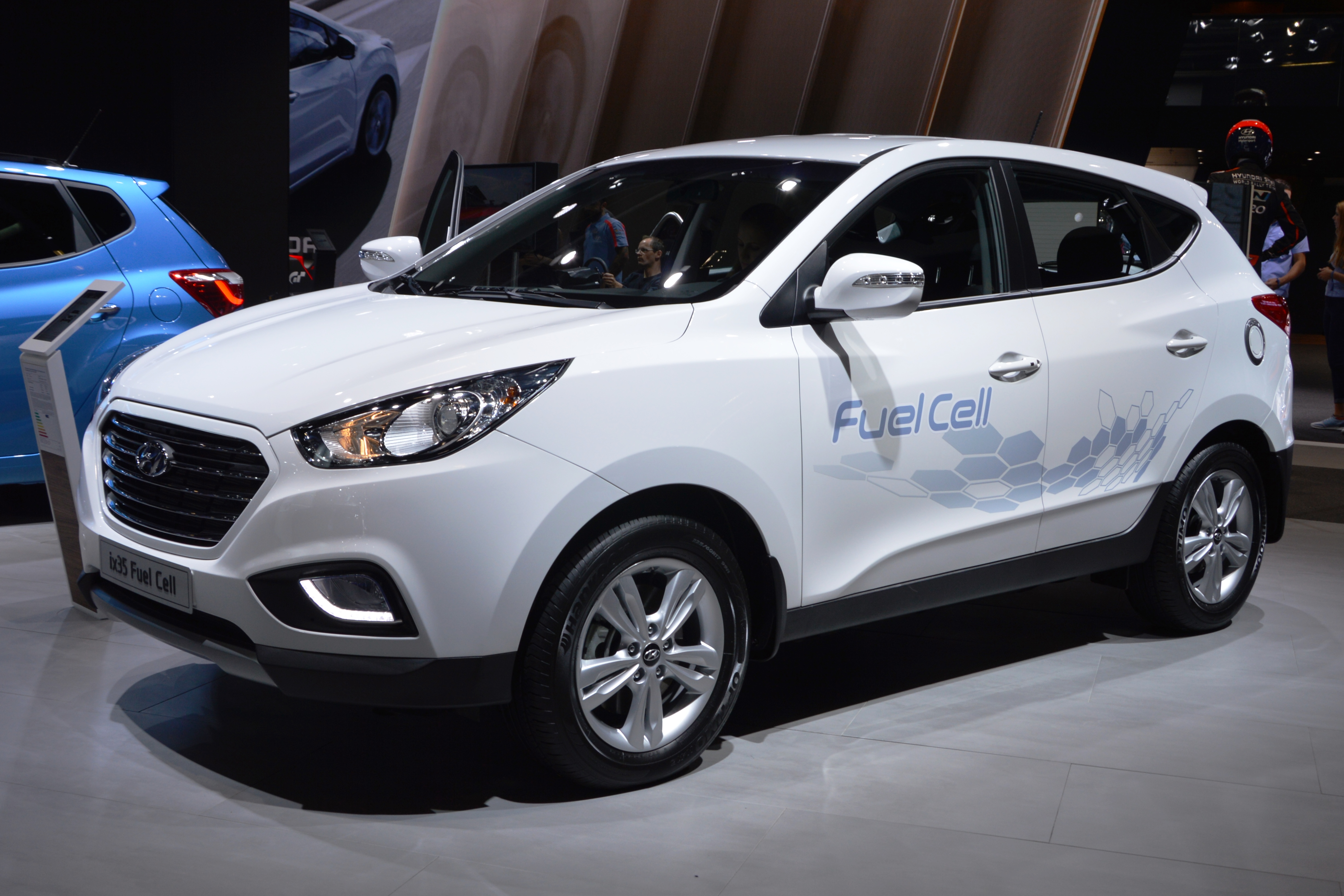
- Hyundai ix35 Fuel Cell

Overview
- Manufacturer: Hyundai
- Production: 2013–2018

Body and chassis
- Related: Hyundai Tucson (LM)

Powertrain
- Electric motor: Fuel cell hydrogen-powered
- Range: 594 km (369 mi)

Chronology
- Successor: Hyundai Nexo

The Hyundai ix35 FCEV or Tucson FCEV is a hydrogen fuel cell electric vehicle developed by Hyundai. The model is a left-hand drive only conversion to the SUV platform it is based on and was the first of its type to be mass-produced and sold commercially in the world. Different versions are known, the previous version was based on the Hyundai Tucson FCEV, and the upcoming model is based on the current ix35 FCEV. The first generation was introduced in 2001, with the Hyundai Santa Fe FCEV, and had a range of 100 miles (160 km), with a top speed of 78 mph (126 km/h).

The second generation Tucson FCEV was introduced in 2005, used a graphite bipolar plate and had a range of 186 miles (300 km), with a top speed of 93 mph (150 km/h). The third generation is based on the Hyundai ix35 (2009), production was semi automatic and used a metal bipolar plate.

The current version and fourth generation is the 2012 ix35 FCEV. The Tucson ix35 FCEV has a more powerful electric engine rated at 100 kW (134 horsepower), and a range of about 369 miles (594 km). This improvement in range is due in part to the Tucson ix35 FCEV's greater space for holding Hydrogen tanks of compressed hydrogen, higher storage pressure, as well as fuel cell technology advances.

The cars have made use of a "sandwich" design concept, aimed at maximizing room for both passengers and the propulsion components. The fuel cell is a proton exchange membrane fuel cell (PEMFC).

== Tucson ix35 FCEV (2012) ==
The Hyundai ix35 FCEV is in production since 2013, a production vehicle that is powered by a fuel cell with hydrogen. Hyundai indicates an output of 100 kW (136PS) and a torque of 300 Nm. A tank contains 5.64 kg of hydrogen and should last for a range of nearly 600 km.

=== Production ===
In February 2013, Hyundai announced that it started production at Ulsan, South Korea of Hyundai ix35 based FCEV's. In 2015, the production of 10,000 units started. The first fifteen cars went to the hydrogen link network, Copenhagen and two to Hydrogen Sweden, Skåne. In 2015, vehicles were ordered or delivered in eleven countries in the EU, and fifteen countries in total worldwide. Up to June 2015, 273 cars had been shipped out for sales (including 29 in Korea, 116 in the United States, and 117 in Europe).

=== Hydrogen storage ===
The 700 Bar (10,153 PSI) hydrogen tanks for hydrogen storage contain enough fuel for a 369 miles (594 km) drive.

=== Recognition ===
The Hyundai ix35 fuel cell electric vehicle won the Future Auto accolade at the 2013 Brussels Motor Show.

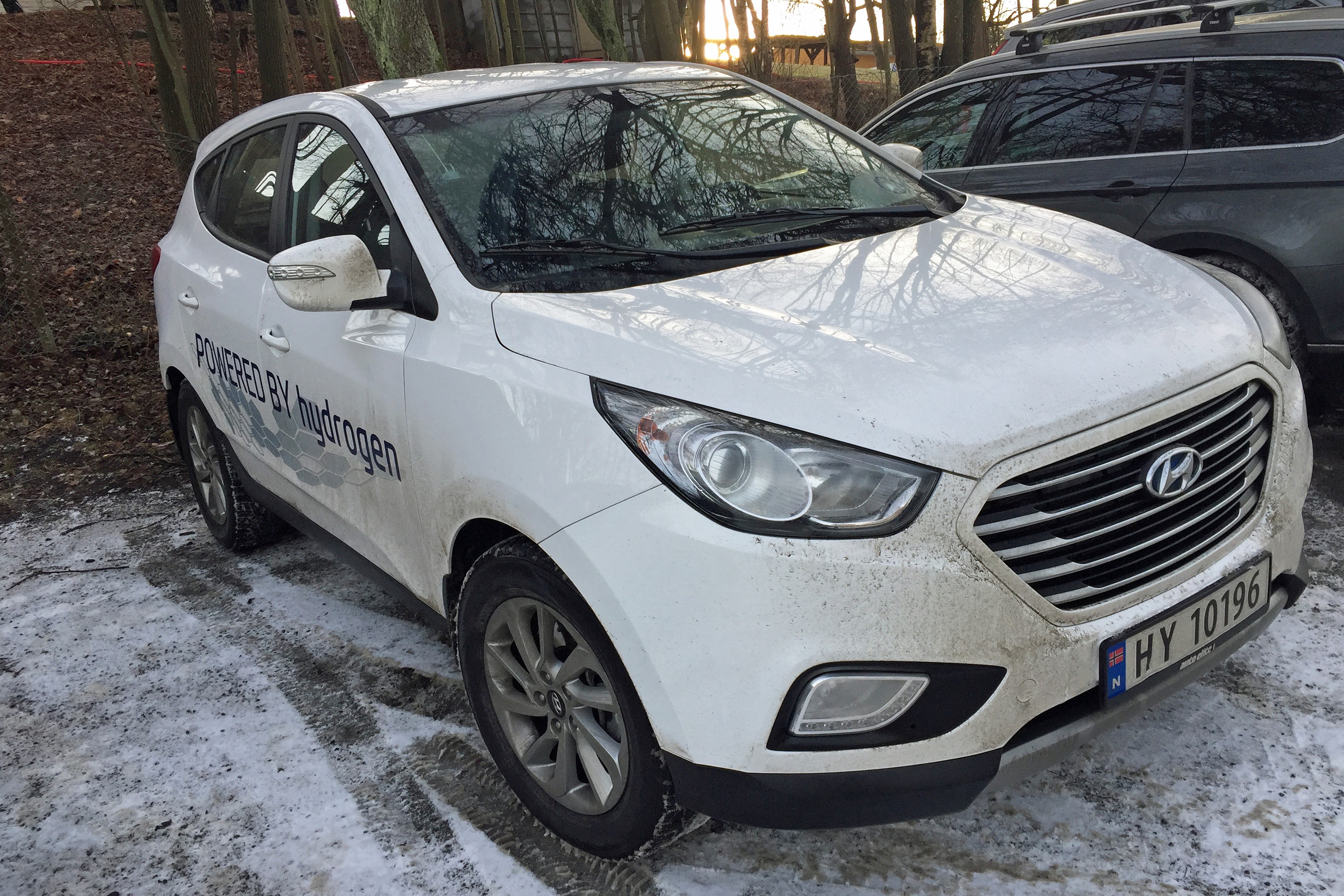
Hyundai ix35 Fuel Cell in Norway

=== Canada ===
The first Hyundai Tucson Fuel Cell (ix35) sold in Canada was delivered in January 2015. Due to the location of refill stations, the vehicles are only leased or sold in the Vancouver Metropolitan Area/Fraser Valley, British Columbia; the Greater Toronto Area; and in Alberta.

=== South Korea ===
The ix35 FCEV is priced at KRW85 million (US$77,300) with a South Korean government subsidy of KRW60 million (US$57,707), the start of mass production and the use of cheaper materials in the future should lead to lower prices.

Discontinued due to launching the successor, the Hyundai Nexo in 2018.

=== United States ===
The first ix35 FCEV was delivered in June 2014 in Tustin (California) with a lease price of $499/mo, a $2,999 down payment with unlimited free fuelling for a three-year period.

== Tucson FCEV (2005) ==
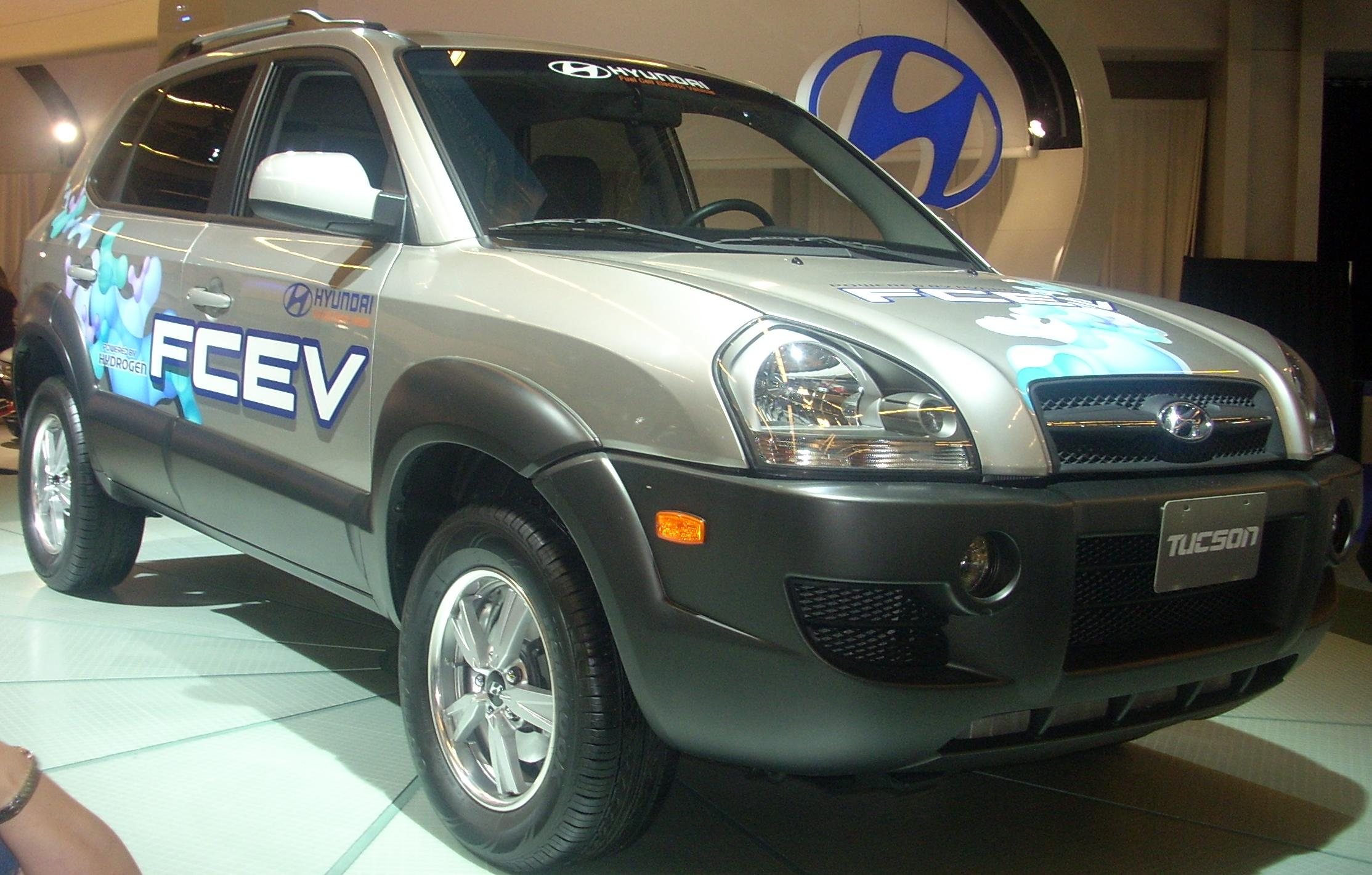
Hyundai Tucson FCEV (2005)

The Tucson Fuel Cell Electric Vehicle (FCEV) is a test fuel cell vehicle for Hyundai's second generation hydrogen fuel cell.

The vehicle includes an 80 kW electric motor by Enova Systems of Torrance, California, UTC Fuel Cells by South Windsor, Connecticut, 152V battery co developed by Hyundai Motor Co. and LG Chem in Seoul, Korea, 152 litres (33 imp gal; 40 US gal) hydrogen storage tanks developed by Dynetek Industries Ltd. of Calgary, Alberta, Canada.

The vehicle has range of 300 kilometres (186.4 mi) and top speed of 150 km/h (93 mph). The vehicle was unveiled in 2005 at the Los Angeles Auto Show and completed a 4,300-mile (6,900 km) journey as part of the Hydrogen Road Tour in 2008.

== See also ==
- List of fuel cell vehicles
- Hyundai Nexo
