= List of aircraft (W) =

This is a list of aircraft in alphabetical order beginning with 'W'.

== W ==
=== W1 ===
- W1 Drevak

=== WAACO ===
(West Australian Aircraft Company – WAACO)

- WAACO Staggerbipe Mk.1

=== Wabash ===
(Wabash Aircraft Co, Terre Haute Indiana, United States)

- Wabash WA-250X

=== WAC ===
(Wilmington Aero Club, Wilmington Delaware, United States)

- WAC Delaplane

=== Wackett ===
(Lawrence J. Wackett)

- Wackett Warbler
- Wackett Gannet
- Wackett Warrigal
- Wackett Widgeon I
- Wackett Widgeon II

=== Waco ===
(1920 Weaver Aircraft Co 1923: Advance Aircraft Co. 1928: Waco Aircraft Co., United States)

- Early Waco types

- Waco 1 Baby Flying Boat
- Waco 1 Cootie
- Waco 2 Cootie Biplane
- Waco 3
- Waco 4
- Waco 4-1/2
- Waco 5
- Waco 6
- Waco 7
- Waco 8
- Waco 9
- Waco International

- Waco O series (Variants of Waco 10 – open cockpit biplanes 1927-9)

- Waco 10 series

- Waco 90
- Waco 125
- Waco 220-T
- Waco 225-TW
- Waco 240-A
- Waco BS-165
- Waco CS-225
- Waco GXE
- Siemens-Waco

- SO series (Straightwing)

- Waco ASO
- Waco BSO
- Waco CSO-A
- Waco CSO
- Waco DSO
- Waco HSO
- Waco KSO
- Waco OSO
- Waco PSO
- Waco QSO
- Waco RSO

- TO series (Taperwing)

- Waco ATO
- Waco CTO-A
- Waco CTO
- Waco HTO
- Waco JTO
- Waco JYO

- Waco A series (2-seat side-by-side biplanes 1932–1933)

- BA series

- Waco BBA
- Waco IBA
- Waco KBA
- Waco PBA
- Waco TBA
- Waco UBA

- CA series

- Waco ICA
- Waco KCA
- Waco PCA
- Waco TCA
- Waco UCA

- LA series

- Waco PLA Sportsman
- Waco ULA Sportsman

- Waco Standard Cabin series biplanes (1932–1938)

- DC series

- Waco BDC
- Waco ODC
- Waco PDC
- Waco QDC
- Waco UDC

- EC series

- Waco BEC
- Waco OEC
- Waco UEC

- IC series

- Waco UIC

- JC series

- Waco CJC
- Waco DJC

- KC series

- Waco UKC
- Waco YKC

- KC-S series

- Waco UKC-S
- Waco YKC-S
- Waco ZKC-S

- JC-S series

- Waco CJC-S
- Waco DJC-S

- KS series

- Waco DKS-6
- Waco HKS-7
- Waco UKS
- Waco VKS-7
- Waco YKS
- Waco ZKS

- Waco Custom Cabin Series sesquiplanes (1935–1938)

- GC series

- Waco AGC-8
- Waco DGC-7 Custom Cabin
- Waco EGC-7 Custom Cabin
- Waco EGC-8
- Waco MGC-8
- Waco UGC-7
- Waco VGC-7
- Waco YGC
- Waco ZGC

- QC series

- Waco AQC-6
- Waco CQC-6
- Waco DQC-6
- Waco EQC-6
- Waco SQC-6
- Waco UQC-6
- Waco VQC-6
- Waco YQC-6
- Waco ZQC-6

- UC series

- Waco CUC

- OC series

- Waco UOC
- Waco YOC

- Waco D series (Military biplanes 1934–37)

- Waco CHD
- Waco JHD-6
- Waco S2HD Super Sport
- Waco S3HD-A
- Waco S3HD
- Waco WHD

- Waco E series Executive "Aristocrat" cabin biplanes (1939)

- Waco ARE
- Waco HRE
- Waco SRE
- Waco WRE

- Waco F series tandem 2/3-seat open cockpit biplanes (1930–1937)

- BF series

- Waco OBF
- Waco PBF
- Waco TBF
- Waco UBF

- CF series

- Waco PCF
- Waco QCF
- Waco UCF

- MF series

- Waco UMF-3
- Waco UMF-5
- Waco YMF-3
- Waco YMF-5

- NF series

- Waco ENF Special
- Waco INF
- Waco KNF
- Waco MNF
- Waco QNF
- Waco RNF

- PF series

- Waco CPF
- Waco DPF
- Waco EPF
- Waco HPF-7
- Waco LPF-7
- Waco UPF
- Waco VPF
- Waco YPF
- Waco ZPF

- Waco M series (Mailplanes based on Waco 10)

- Waco JWM
- Waco JYM

- Waco N series tricycle/nosewheel gear cabin biplanes (1937–1938)

- Waco AVN-8
- Waco ZVN-7
- Waco ZVN-8

- Military Aircraft

- Waco C-62 (Cancelled Transport)
- Waco C-72 (designation for all Wacos impressed into USAAC/USAAF)
- Waco CG-4 (troop glider)
- Waco CG-15 (troop glider)
- Waco PG-3 (powered glider)
- Waco XJW (US Navy designation for UBF used for trapeze experiments on flying aircraft carriers)
- Waco J2W (USCG designation for EGC-7)
- Waco PT-14 (USAAC designation for primary trainer based on UPF-7)

- Misc Waco Types

- Waco Aristocraft pusher cabin monoplane
- Waco CRG (1930 National Air Tour Special, two CRGs only)
- Waco FBH (ad hoc aircraft built by Waco employees)
- Waco LAJ (powered glider)
- Waco NAZ (Primary glider)
- Waco SFB
- Waco RPT (low-wing monoplane military trainer)
- WACO Sirrus
- VELA S220

=== Waco ===
(Waco Aircraft Co Inc (founders: Rich & Linda Melhoff), Forks Washington, United States)

- Waco Super Taperwing

=== Wacyk-Tyrala ===
(Stanisław Wacyk and Tadeuz Tyrala)

- Wacyk-Tyrala WT-1

=== Wadsworth ===
(Patrick Wadsworth)

- Wadsworth PW-01

=== WAG-Aero ===
(WAG-Aero Inc., Lyons Wisconsin, United States)

- WAG-Aero CUBy
- Wag-Aero CHUBy CUBy
- Wag-Aero Sportsman 2+2
- WAG-Aero WAG-A-Bond

=== Wagner ===
(Dr. Gerhard Wagner)

- Wagner DOWA 81

=== Wagner ===
(Harold A Wagner, 4539 NE 21 St, Portland Oregon, United States)

- Wagner Parasol
- Wagner Twin 1
- Wagner Twin 2
- Wagner Twin 3

=== Wagner ===
(Helikopter Technik Munchen – Wagner)

- Wagner Sky-trac
- Wagner Aerocar

=== Wagner ===
((Fred G) Wagner Aircraft Co Inc, San Diego California, United States)

- Wagner W-18 Flight article on W-18 here:

=== Wagner ===
(Marney Wagner)

- Wagner V-Witt

=== Wainfan ===
(Barnaby Wainfan, Long Beach California, United States)

- Wainfan Facetmobile FMX-4
- Wainfan Facetmobile FMX-5

=== Wainscott ===
(Lee Wainscott, Compton California, United States)

- Wainscott 1950 Biplane

=== Waitamo Aircraft ===
(Waitamo Aircraft pty. Ltd.)

- Waitamo PL-11 Airtruck

=== Walco ===
(Weckler-Armstrong-Lillie Co, 2717 Irving Park Blvd, Chicago Illinois, United States)

- WALCO biplane flying boat
- Walco Tandem Monoplane Air Boat

=== Walden ===
( Dr Henry W Walden, Mineola New York, United States)

- Walden I
- Walden II
- Walden III
- Walden IV
- Walden V
- Walden VI
- Walden VII
- Walden VIII
- Walden IX
- Walden X
- Walden XI
- Walden XII

=== Walden ===
((Henry?) Walden-(Roscoe) Markey Inc, Strickland & Bassett Aves, Mill Basin New York, United States)

- Walden-Markey WM-1

=== Waldroop ===
(Arthur L Waldroop, Palmyra Nebraska, United States)

- Waldroop A-1

=== Walker ===
(Sam Walker)

- Walker Aria

=== Walker-Greve ===
(Fred & Herman Greve, Detroit, Michigan, United States)

- Walker-Greve Wild Goose

=== Walkerjet ===
(Třemošná, Czech Republic)

- Walkerjet Schoolboy
- Walkerjet Simon
- Walkerjet Simon +
- Walkerjet Simon Compact
- Walkerjet Simon Tandem
- Walkerjet Spider
- Walkerjet Super Hawk
- Walkerjet XC 100 evo
- Walkerjet XC 200 evo

=== Wallace ===
( (Stanley) Wallace Aircraft Co, 4710 Irving Park Blvd, Chicago, Illinois, United States)

- Wallace C-2
- Wallace Touroplane B
- Wallace C-31
- Wallace Trainer

=== Wallace Brothers ===
(Frank C and Fred M Wallace, Bettendorf Iowa, United States)

- Wallace Brothers Blackhawk

=== Wallis ===
(Ken Wallis, Reymerston Hall, Norfolk, England)

- Wallis Venom
- Wallis WA-116 Agile
- Wallis WA-117
- Wallis WA-118 Meteorite
- Wallis WA-119
- Wallis WA-120
- Wallis WA-121
- Wallis WA-122

=== Wallis ===
(Stanley B Wallis, Ypsilanti Michigan, United States)

- Wallis 1981 Biplane

=== Wallman ===
(Fred W Wallman Jr, Minneapolis Minnesota, United States)

- Wallman Sportplane

=== Walraven ===
(L.W. Walraven, Bandoeng, Java)

- Walraven 2
- Walraven 4

=== Walsh ===
(San Diego Aeroplane Mfg Co (fdr: Charles Francis Walsh), San Diego California, United States)

- Walsh 1910 Monoplane
- Walsh 1910 Biplane
- Walsh 1911 Biplane

=== Walsh brothers ===
(Walsh Brothers, New Zealand)

- Walsh Brothers Manurewa No 1
- Walsh Brothers Type D

=== Walter ===
(Dale "Red" Walter & Roy Campbell, Severy Kansas, United States)

- Walter Dale RD-9

=== WAR ===
(War Aircraft Replicas, Brandon, Florida, United States)

- W.A.R. Focke-Wulf 190
- W.A.R. F4U Corsair
- W.A.R. P-47 Thunderbolt
- W.A.R. Hawker Sea Fury
- W.A.R. P-51 Mustang
- W.A.R. P40E
- W.A.R. Japanese Zero
- W.A.R. P-38 Lightning
- W.A.R. Bf109
- W.A.R. TA-152H: "long nose Focke Wulf"
- W.A.R. Macchi C.200 Saetta
- W.A.R. Grumman F8F Bearcat
- W.A.R. Hawker Tempest II
- W.A.R. Hawk 75A-3
- W.A.R. Fokker D.XXI
- W.A.R. F6F-3 Hellcat
- W.A.R. Lavochkin La. 5FN
- W.A.R. Junkers Ju. 87B-2 Stuka "Inline Czech Walter Minor engine specified".
- W.A.R. P-26 Peashooter
- W.A.R. Spitfire

=== Warbird ===
Data from:

- Warbird 80% Scale Bearcat
- Warbird 75% Scale P47
- Warbird 84% Scale Zero
- Warbird 78% Scale Dauntless
- Warbird Scale Stuka
- Warbird Scale FW190
- Warbird Scale AT6

=== Warchalowski ===
- Warchalowski Biplane

=== Warne ===
(Monte Warne, Tennessee, United States)

- Warne Bubble Plane

=== Warner ===
(Arthur P Warner, Beloit Wisconsin, United States)

- Warner-Curtiss 1909 Biplane

=== Warner Aerocraft ===
(Warner Aerocraft Company, Seminole, Florida, United States)

- Warner Revolution I
- Warner Revolution II
- Warner Spacewalker I
- Warner Spacewalker II
- Warner Sportster

=== Warner-Young ===
- Warner-Young Skycar

=== Warren ===
(W H "Glen" Warren, San Luis Obispo California, United States)

- Warren CP-1
- Warren CP-2
- Warren Taperwing

=== Warren & Young ===
- Warren & Young 1937 aeroplane

=== Warrior ===
(Warrior Aeronautical Corp, Alliance Ohio, United States)

- Warrior C

=== Warwick ===
(William Warwick, Torrance California, United States)

- Warwick M-1 Tiny Champ
- Warwick W-3 Bantam
- Warwick W-4 Hot Canary

=== Washington ===
(Washington Aeroplane Co, College Park Maryland, United States)

- Washington Miss Columbia

=== Washington Aeroprogress ===
(Seattle, Washington, United States)

- Washington T-411 Wolverine

=== Washington Navy Yard ===
- Washington Navy Yard Seaplane (akaRichardson 82-A)

=== Wasp ===
(Wasp Airplane Co, 3440 Boston Ave and 1044 51 Ave, Oakland California, United States)

- Wasp Special
- Wasp T-2 Air Coupe
- Wasp T-2 Air Coach

=== Waspair ===
- Waspair HM 81 Tomcat
- Waspair Tomcat Standard
- Waspair Tomcat Sport
- Waspair Tomcat Tourer

=== Wasp Systems ===
(Later Wasp Flight Systems, Crook, Cumbria, England)

- Wasp SP Mk2
- Wasp SP Mk4

=== Wassmer ===
(France)

- Wassmer WA-20 Javelot: First flight August 1956. Later referred to as the Javelot I.
- Wassmer WA-21 Javelot II: First flight 25 March 1958.
- Wassmer WA-22 Super Javelot: First flight 26 June 1961. Modified forward fuselage and swept fin.
- Wassmer WA-22 Super Javelot 64: 1964 model, with increased outer wing dihedral.
- Wassmer WA-22-28
- Wassmer WA-23
- Wassmer WA-26 Squale
- Wassmer WA-26 CM Squale Marfa
- Wassmer WA-28 Espadon
- Wassmer WA-30 Bijave
- Wassmer WA-40 Super IV Sancy
- Wassmer WA-41 Baladou
- Wassmer WA-50
- Wassmer WA-51 Pacific
- Wassmer WA-52 Europa
- Wassmer WA-54 Atlantic
- Wassmer WA-70
- Wassmer WA-80 Piranha
- Wassmer D.120 Paris-Nice

=== Watanabe ===
(Japan) (KK Watanabe Tekkosho - Watanabe Iron Works Ltd.) (from 1943 - Kyushu Aeroplane Company Ltd. q.v.)

- Watanabe E9W
- Watanabe E14W
- Watanabe K6W
- Watanabe K8W
- Watanabe Q1W Tokai
- Watanabe Q3W1 Nankai (South Sea)
- Watanabe Navy Experimental 9-Shi Small Reconnaissance Seaplane
- Watanabe Navy Experimental 11-Shi Intermediate Seaplane Trainer
- Watanabe Navy Experimental 12-Shi Small Reconnaissance Seaplane
- Watanabe Navy Experimental 12-Shi Primary Seaplane Trainer
- Watanabe Navy Type 96 Small Reconnaissance Seaplane
- Watanabe Navy Type 2 Primary Trainer Momiji
- Watanabe Navy Type 2 Intermediate Trainer
- Watanabe Navy Type 2 Fighter Trainer
- Watanabe Navy Type 3-2 Land-based Primary Trainer
- Watanabe Siam Navy Reconnaissance Seaplane (K6W)
- Watanabe MXY-1
- Watanabe MXY-2

=== Water-based Aircraft Design & Research Institute ===
- Sea Gull-100(A1)
- Sea Gull-200

=== Waterhouse ===
( (William J) Waterhouse & (Lloyd) Royer Aircraft, Glendale California, United States)

- Waterhouse BC-1 Tijuana
- Waterhouse BC-2 Tijuana
- Waterhouse BC-3 Tijuana
- Waterhouse Roamair
- Waterhouse Cruizair

=== Waterman ===
(Waterman Aircraft Mfg Co, 3rd & Sunset, Venice California, United States.{Waldo Dean Waterman})

- Waterman 1910 Biplane
- Waterman 1911 Biplane
- Waterman 3L-400
- Waterman W-1
- Waterman W-1 Special
- Waterman W-4 Arrowplane
- Waterman W-5 Arrowbile
- Waterman-Boeing C
- Waterman Gosling
- Waterman Flying Wing
- Waterman Flex-Wing (a.k.a. CLM Special and Variable Wing Monoplane)
- Waterman Pusher
- Waterman Chevy Bird
- Waterman Arrowplane
- Waterman Arrowbile
- Waterman Aerobile
- Waterman Whatsit
- Waterman CLM Special (a.k.a. Flex-Wing and Variable Wing Monoplane)
- Waterman Variable Wing Monoplane (a.k.a. CLM Special and Flex-Wing)

=== Watkins ===
(Watkins Aircraft Co (pres: Everett Watkins), Wichita Kansas, United States)

- Watkins SL-1
- Watkins SL-2 Skylark (a.k.a. X-470E)

=== Watkinson ===
(Taylor Watkinson Aircraft Company, United Kingdom)

- Watkinson Dingbat, also known as Taylor-Watkinson Dingbat

=== Watson ===
(Watson Windwagon Company / Gary Watson, Newcastle Texas, United States)

- Watson GW-1 Windwagon

=== WDFL ===
(WD Flugzeug Leichtbau / Wolfgang Dallach)

- Dallach D.2 Sunrise
- Dallach D.4 Fascination
- Dallach Sunrise IIA
- Dallach Sunrise IIB
- Dallach Sunrise IIC
- Dallach Sunrise (Verner)
- WDFL Sunwheel

=== Weatherley ===
((John C) Weatherly Aviation Co Inc, Hollister, California, United States)

- Weatherly WM-62C
- Weatherly 201
- Weatherly 210
- Weatherly 620

=== Weatherly-Campbell ===
(Ray Weatherly & Bill Campbell, Dallas Texas, United States)

- Weatherly Colt

=== Weaver-Wellet ===
(Goodwin K Weaver & Oliver Wellet, a.k.a. Weaver Air Service, 353 S Audubon Rd, Indianapolis Indiana, United States)

- Weaver-Wellet WAS-5
- Weaver-Wellet WW-1

=== Webber ===
(Marshal D Webber, Jefferson Ohio, United States)

- Webber BFW-1

=== Weber ===
(Ernst Weber)

- Weber EW 18

=== Weber ===
(Wilibald Weber)

- Weber Perereca

=== Wedell-Williams ===
( (James R) Wedell-(Harry P) Williams Air Service Corp, Patterson Louisiana, United States)

- Wedell-Williams We-Will (1929)
- Wedell-Williams We-Winc (1930)
- Wedell-Williams We-Will Jr. (1932)
- Wedell-Williams McRobertson racer
- Wedell-Williams Model 22
- Wedell-Williams Model 44
- Wedell-Williams Model 44 Special
- Wedell-Williams Model 45
- Wedell-Williams XP-34

=== Weeks ===
(Kermit Weeks, Miami Florida, United States)

- Weeks Special
- Weeks Solution

=== Weeks-Riggs ===
(Elling O Weeks and E A "Gus" Riggs, Terre Haute Indiana, United States)

- Weeks-Riggs 1910 aeroplane
- Weeks-Riggs 1911 aeroplane

=== Wega ===
(Wega Industria Aeronautica, Palhoça, Santa Catarina, Brazil)

- Wega 180
- Wega XP360
- Wega XP400
- Wega FG

=== Weick ===
(Fred E Weick, 130 Cherokee Rd, Hampton Virginia, United States)

- Weick W-1
- Weick Ag-1
- Weick Ag-2
- Weick Ag-3

=== Weidmann ===
((George) Weidmann Body & Trailer Co, North Tonawanda New York, United States)

- Weidmann Flying Tank

=== Weil ===
(Lehman Weil, 225 West 71 St, New York New York, United States)

- Weil 1927 Ornithopter

=== Weinberg ===
(William Weinberg)

- Weinberg S.E.5a Replica

=== Weir ===
(G & J Weir Ltd. United Kingdom)

- Weir W.1
- Weir W.2
- Weir W.3
- Weir W.4
- Weir W.5
- Weir W.6
- Weir W.7
- Weir W.8
- Weir W.9
- Weir W.10
- Weir W.11 Air Horse
- Weir W.13
- Weir W.14 Skeeter

=== Weiss ===
see:Manfred Weiss

=== Welch ===
((Orin) Welch Aircraft Co, Anderson IN. / Welch Aviation Co.)

- Welch 1927 Biplane
- Welch OW-1
- Welch OW-2
- Welch OW-3 (a.k.a. Hi-Lift)
- Welch OW-4
- Welch OW-5M
- Welch ACE Falcon
- Welch OW-6M
- Welch OW-6S
- Welch OW-7M
- Welch OW-8M
- Welch OW-9M
- Welch OW-10
- Welch OW-X
- Welch Parasol
- Welch-Standard J-1

=== Weller Flugzeugbau ===
(Bibersfeld, Germany)

- Weller ULI NG
- Weller UW-9 Sprint
- Weller Vickers Blériot

=== Weller-Lusk ===
(R C Lusk & R M Weller, Burbank California, United States)

- Weller-Lusk Model 1

=== Wellington ===
(Harry Wellington, Ontario California, United States)

- Wellington Sport Mk 1 Pup

=== Wells ===
(Harry Wells, Cicero Illinois, United States)

- Wells 1915 Biplane"Reo"

=== Wells ===
(Eugene W Wells, Hawaii, United States)

- Wells Shama WWI

=== Welsh ===
(George T Welsh, Long Beach California, United States)

- Welsh Rabbit A
- Welsh Rabbit B

=== Welsher ===
(Burdette Star Welsher, 519 High St, San Luis Obispo California, United States)

- Welsher Arrowplane

=== Weltensegler ===
- Weltensegler light biplane

=== Wendt ===
((Robert) Wendt Aircraft Corp, 825 Main St, N Tonawanda New York, United States)

- Wendt W-1-400 Falconer
- Wendt W-2 Swift

=== Wendt ===
((Harold O) Wendt Aircraft Engr, La Mesa California, United States)

- Wendt WH-1 Traveler

=== Werkheiser & Matson ===
(C M Matson & Harlan Werkheiser, Bloomsburg Pennsylvania, United States)

- Werkheiser & Matson Model A (a.k.a. Experimental)

=== Werkspoor ===
(Werkspoor NV)

- Werkspoor Jumbo

=== Wesley ===
(Joseph K Wesley, Somerset Kentucky, United States)

- Wesley Special

=== Weserflug ===
(Weser Flugzeugbau)

- Weserflug Bf 163
- Weserflug WFG 270
- Weserflug We 271

=== West ===
(Russell West, Atlanta (GA?) Packard Co.)

- West Special
- West Southern Air Boss

=== West Coast ===
(West Coast Air Service Inc, Portland Oregon, United States)

- West Coast 1928 Monoplane

=== Westbrook ===
(Westbrook Aeronautical Corp (founders: John Knox McAfee, Neil Westbrook Perdew), Teterboro, New Jersey, United States)

- Westbrook W-5
- Westbrook W-5-B Sportster

=== Westermayer ===
(Oskar Westermayer)

- Westermayer WE 01
- Westermayer WE 03
- Westermayer WE 04
- Westermayer B8M

=== Western ===
(Western Aircraft Supplies, Calgary Alberta Canada)

- Western PGK-1 Hirondelle

=== Western ===
(Western Airplane & Supply Co, Burbank California, United States)

- Western Sport

=== Western ===
(Western Airplane Co, 53 W Jackson Blvd, Chicago Illinois, United States)

- Western Airplane King Bird

=== Western ===
(Western Aircraft Corp (pres: Georges Hamilton), San Antonio Texas, United States)

- Western Westair 204

=== Western Aircraft ===
(Western Aircraft Corp, 521 Cooper Bldg, Denver Colorado, United States)

- Western Aircraft Sport

=== Western Aircraft Supplies ===
(Western Aircraft Supplies)

- Western Aircraft Supplies Monsoon
- Western PGK-1 Hirondelle

=== Westfall ===
( Westfall Aircraft Co.)

- Westfall Sport

=== Westfield ===
(Miles Westfall, Oklahoma City OK and New Richmond Indiana, United States)

- Westfall W-7 Special
- Westfall W-7 Sport

=== Westfield ===
(Westfield Aircraft Co (Summit Aeronautical Corp), Westfield Massachusetts, United States)

- Westfield Trainer

=== Westland ===
(United Kingdom)

- Westland Belvedere
- Westland C.29
- Westland C.O.W. Gun Fighter
- Westland CL.20 1930s autogyro
- Westland Dragonfly
- Westland Dreadnought
- Westland F.29/27
- Westland F.7/30
- Westland Gazelle
- Westland Gannet
- Westland Interceptor
- Westland Limousine
- Westland Lynx
- Westland Lysander
- Westland Merlin
- Westland N.1B
- Westland N.16
- Westland N.17
- Westland-Hill Pterodactyl
- Westland PV-3 (Houston-Westland)
- Westland P.V.6
- Westland P.V.7
- Westland Scout
- Westland Sea King
- Westland Sea King AEW.2
- Westland Sea King AEW.5
- Westland Sea King ASaC7
- Westland Sioux
- Westland Super Lynx
- Westland Wagtail
- Westland Wallace
- Westland Walrus
- Westland Wapiti
- Westland Wasp
- Westland Weasel
- Westland Welkin
- Westland Wessex
- Westland Wessex (fixed wing).
- Westland Westbury
- Westland Westminster
- Westland Whirlwind (fixed wing)
- Westland Whirlwind (helicopter)
- Westland Widgeon (fixed wing)
- Westland Widgeon (helicopter)
- Westland Witch
- Westland Wizard
- Westland Wyvern
- Westland Yeovil
- Westland WG.33

=== Weyger ===
(Alexander Weyger)

- Alexander Weyger Discopter

=== Weymann ===
(Charles Terres Weymann / Société des Avions C.T.Weymann / Lepère)

- Weymann W-1
- Weymann CTW-66
- Weymann CTW-100
- Weymann CTW-130
- Weymann CTW-131
- Weymann CTW-200
- Weymann CTW-201
- Weymann CTW-210
- Weymann CTW-231
- Weymann-Lepère WEL-10
- Weymann-Lepère WEL-50
- Weymann-Lepère WEL-52
- Weymann-Lepère WEL-63 tri-motor airliner
- Weymann-Lepère WEL-80
- Weymann-Lepère Aeromobile

=== Weyrauch ===
(Ronaldo Weyrauch)

- Weyrauch MZ-1 (Mehrzweck Zweimot No.1 or multirole twin no.1)

=== Wezel ===
(Martin Wezel Flugzeugtechnik)

- Wezel TL Sting
- Wezel TL 3000 Sirius
- Wezel Apis 2

=== W_F_W ===
- see:- Thunderbird

=== Whatley ===
(Vascoe Whatley)

- Whatley Special

=== WHE ===
(W.H. Ekin) United Kingdom

- WHE Airbuggy

=== Wheelair ===
(Puget-Pacific Airplane Co; Tacoma Washington, United States)

- Wheelair-IIIA

=== Wheeler ===
(Ken Wheeler / Wheeler Technology)

- Wheeler Express

=== Wheeler ===
(Ron Wheeler Aircraft (Slaes) Pty. Ltd.)

- Wheeler Scout Mk.III

=== Wheeling ===
(Wheeling Aircraft Co, Pontiac Michigan, United States)

- Wheeling PJ-1

=== Whigham ===
(Eugene Whigham)

- Whigham GW-1
- Whigham GW-2
- Whigham GW-3
- Whigham GW-4
- Whigham GW-5
- Whigham GW-7

=== Whisper Aircraft ===
(Mossel Bay, South Africa)

- Whisper Aircraft Whisper
- Whisper X350 Generation II

=== Whitcraft ===
(Whitcraft Corp, Eastford Connecticut, United States)

- Whitcraft 165

=== White ===
(George D White, 117 E 49 St, Los Angeles California, United States)

- White Baby White
- White Sport Monoplane
- White Trans-Pacific Flyer

=== White ===
(George White, St Augustine Florida, United States)

- White 1928 Ornithopter

=== White ===
((Donald G) White Aircraft Co, Woodward Airport, Leroy New York, United States)

- White A-R
- White D-25B
- White Gull
- White Pirate
- White PT-2
- White PT-7
- White Tiger

=== White ===
(William T White, Dallas Texas, United States)

- White Longhorn

=== White ===
(E Marshall White, Huntington Beach California, United States)

- White WW-1 Der Jäger D.IX

=== White ===
(Van White, Lubbock Texas, United States)

- White Whirlwind

=== White & Thompson ===
- White & Thompson No.1 Seaplane
- White & Thompson No.2 Flying Boat
- White & Thompson No.3
- White & Thompson NT.3 Bognor Bloater

=== White's ===
( (Burdette S & Harold L) White's Aircraft, Ames Iowa, United States)

- White's Hummingbird
- White's A
- White's B
- White's Sport C-1
- White's Sport C-2
- White's Sport C-3
- White's Sport S-30
- Burdette S-30
- Whitey Sport A

=== White-Kremsreiter ===
((Benjamin) White-(Hans) Kremsreiter, Milwaukee Wisconsin, United States)

- White-Kremsreiter W-K Special

=== Whitehead ===
(Whitehead Aircraft Company)

- Whitehead Comet

=== Whitehead ===
(Gustave Whitehead (Gustav Weisskopf), Bridgeport Connecticut, United States)

- Whitehead Number 21 (1901)
- Whitehead 1911 Helicopter

=== Whiteman ===
(Lawrence Henry Whiteman, Wichita Kansas, United States)

- Whiteman Junior

=== Whitman ===
(Earl E Whitman, Point Richmond California, United States)

- Whitman Amphibian

=== Whitney ===
(Dean-Wilson Aviation Ltd / C.W. "Bill" Whitney)

- Whitney Boomerang

=== Whittaker ===
(Michael Whittaker, Clayton, Yorkshire, England)

- Whittaker MW2 Excalibur
- Whittaker MW4
- Whittaker MW5 Sorcerer
- Whittaker MW6S Fatboy
- Whittaker MW6T Merlin
- Whittaker MW7
- Whittaker MW8

=== Whittelsey ===
(Whittelsey Mfg Co, 220 Howard St, Bridgeport Connecticut, United States)

- Whittelsey Amphib
- Whittelsey Avian

=== Whittemore-Hamm ===
((Harris) Whittemore-(?) Hamm Co, Saugus Massachusetts, United States)

- Whittemore-Hamm L-2
- Whittemore-Hamm L-3

=== Whittenbeck ===
(Clem Whittenbeck, Greenwood Missouri, Lincoln Nebraska and Miami Oklahoma, United States)

- Whittenbeck Mono-special

=== Whittenburg ===
(Mickey Whittenburg, Connecticut, United States)

- Whittenburg 1965 Monoplane

=== Wibault ===
(Société des Avions Michel Wibault)

- Wibault 1
- Wibault 2
- Wibault 3
- Wibault 7
- Wibault 72
- Wibault 73
- Wibault 74
- Wibault 8 Simoun
- Wibault 9
- Wibault 10 twin boom project
- Wibault 10/II re-allocated for two-seat parasol-wing recce aircraft, built for A.2 1923 competition
- Wibault 12 Sirocco
- Wibault 100 Four engine transport (prototype only)
- Wibault 121 Sirocco
- Wibault 122
- Wibault 123
- Wibault 124
- Wibault 125
- Wibault 13 Trombe I single-seat lightweight fighter to C.1 1926 Jockey fighter contest
- Wibault 130 Trombe I
- Wibault 170 Tornade
- Wibault 210
- Wibault 220
- Wibault 240
- Wibault 260
- Wibault 270 1928 C.1 spec.
- Wibault 280T
- Wibault 281T
- Wibault 282T
- Wibault 283T
- Wibault 313
- Wibault 360T5
- Wibault 361
- Wibault 362
- Wibault 363
- Wibault 364
- Wibault 365
- Wibault 366
- Wibault 367
- Wibault 368

==== Wibault significant projects ====
Wib.4 heavy bomber project? Wib.5 single-seat parasol-wing fighter project, submitted to C.1 1923 Wib.6 two-seat parasol-wing fighter derivative of Wib.5 Wib.11 single-seat fighter project powered by one 500 hp engine, for C.1 1923 Wib.14 two-seat parasol-wing tourist aircraft project Wib.14H a floatplane version of Wib.14 Wib.15 single-seat fighter project to C.1 1926 contest Wib.160 Trombe II a more powerful version of Wib.130 Trombe I, also for C.1 1926 Wib.170 single-seat lightweight fighter for C.1 1926 Wib.230 three-engined transport aircraft project? Wib.270 single-seat lightweight fighter project for C.1 1928 Wib.330 transport aircraft (no more details) Wib.340 two-seat low-wing tourist aircraft project

=== Wichita ===
(Wichita Aeroplane Service Co)

- Wichita 1919 Monoplane

=== Wichita ===
(Wichita Airplane Mfg Co (C A Noll, Anson O Rorabaugh), 716 (?>912) W 1st St, Wichita Kansas, United States)

- Wichita Cadet
- Wichita Cadet Captain
- Wichita Cadet Major

=== Wickham ===
(James Wickham, Seattle Washington, United States)

- Wickham Model A Bluebird
- Wickham Model B
- Wickham Model C Sunbird
- Wickham Model E Sunbird II
- Wickham Model F

=== Wickner ===
(Geoffrey N. Wikner)

- Wicko Cabin Sports
- Wicko Wizard

=== Widerøe ===
(Widerøes Flyveselskap)

- Widerøe Polar

=== Wieber ===
(John C Wieber, Milwaukee Wisconsin, United States)

- Wieber 1934 Biplane

=== Wielemans ===
- Wielemans S.W.1
- Wielemans SW.2

=== Wienberg ===
(William Weinberg, Kansas City, Missouri, United States)

- Weinberg S.E.5a Replica

=== Wier ===
(Ronald Wier, San Diego, California, United States)

- Wier RDW-2 Draggin' Fly

=== Wigal ===
(Fritz Wigal, Jackson Tennessee, United States)

- Wigal 1964 Autogyro

=== Wight ===
(Confusion may reign here:- Owner:J. Samuel White, Designer Howard T. Wright, Company Name Wight Aircraft Co.)

- Wight Twin Landplane
- Wight Twin Seaplane
- Wight Seaplane (Admiralty Type 840)
- Wight Seaplane No.1
- Wight Seaplane No.2
- Wight Converted Seaplane
- Wight Baby
- Wight Pusher Seaplane
- Wight Navyplane
- Wight Improved Navyplane Type A.I
- Wight Improved Navyplane Type A.II
- Wight Quadruplane
- Wight Trainer Seaplane
- Wight Bomber
- Wight Triplane Flying Boat

=== Willard ===
(Also check McCurdy-Willard Planes)

- Willard Channel Wing
- Willard Breathless
- Willard Gasser
- Willard Schoolboy
- Willard Church Mid-Wing Model JC-2

=== Wilbur ===
(Joe W Wilbur, Exeter New Hampshire, United States)

- Wilbur 1931 Monoplane

=== Wilcox ===
- Wilcox White Ghost

=== Wilcox ===
(H F Wilcox Aeronautics Inc, Verdigris Oklahoma, United States)

- Wilcox T-12-1 Sport Trainer

=== Wiley ===
(Oklahoma City Oklahoma, United States)

- Wiley 1934 Monoplane

=== Wild ===
(Alec Wild)S

- Wild DoubleEnder

=== Wild ===
(Robert Wild / Comte)

- Wild DT
- Wild 43
- Wild X biplane

=== Wilde ===
(Lehman Wilde, New York, United States)

- Wilde Ornithicopter

=== Wilder ===
(Charles A Wilder, Bronson Michigan, United States)

- Wilder Model A

=== Wilden ===
(Helmut Wilden)

- Wilden VoWi-8

=== Wildfire Air Racing ===
- Wildfire Air Racing Wildfire

=== Wiley Post ===
(Wiley Post Aircraft Corp, Oklahoma City Oaklahoma, United States)

- Wiley Post Model A

=== Wilford ===
(E Burke Wilford, Paoli Pennsylvania, United States)

- Wilford Executive Transport
- Wilford WRK Gyroplane

=== Willard ===
(Charles F Willard, Hempstead NY and Los Angeles California, United States)

- Willard 1910 Biplane

=== Williams ===
(J Newton Williams, Ansonia Connecticut, United States)

- Williams 1907 Helicopter
- Williams 1908 Helicopter

=== C W Williams ===
(C W Williams)

- Williams 1908 Parafoil

=== O E Williams ===
(O E Williams Aeroplane Co (founders: Osbert Edwin & Inez Williams), Scranton Pennsylvania, United States)

- Williams 1911 Biplane
- Williams 1912 Biplane
- Williams 1913 Biplane
- Williams 1914 Hydro Aeroplane
- Williams 1917
- Williams Model 5

=== Williams ===
(Beryl J Williams Co, Venice & Pasadena California, United States)

- Williams 1911 Biplane

=== Williams ===
(Szekely Aircraft & Engine Co, Holland Michigan, United States)

- Williams Monoplane

=== Williams ===
(Art Williams and Guy Gully, Alliance Ohio, United States)

- Williams Special
- Williams W-17 Stinger
- Williams WC-1 Sundancer
- Williams-Gully Special

=== Williams ===
(Paul Williams, Dayton Ohio, United States)

- Williams 750-PW

=== Williams ===
(Walt Williams, Perris California, United States)

- Williams W

=== Williams ===
(Robert F Williams, Houston Texas, United States)

- Williams Skeeter Hawk

=== Williams ===
(Floyd Williams, Eagle Grove Iowa, United States)

- Williams 1970 Biplane

=== Williams ===
(Bob Williams)

- Williams W-2

=== Williams International ===
((Sam B) Williams Intl, Walled Lake Michigan, United States)

- Williams V-Jet II

=== Williams Texas-Temple ===
(Texas Aero Mfg Co (fdr: George W Williams), Temple Texas, United States)

- Williams Texas-Temple 1908 Monoplane
- Williams Texas-Temple 1926 Monoplane
- Williams Texas-Temple C-4
- Williams Texas-Temple Commercial-Wing
- Williams Texas-Temple Speed-Wing
- Williams Texas-Temple Sport
- Williams Texas-Temple Trimotor
- Williams Texas-Temple Sportsman

=== Williamson ===
(Roger Williamson, San Antonio Texas, United States)

- Williamson Roadrunner

=== Willoughby ===
(Capt Hugh L. Willoughby, Newport Rhode Island, United States)

- Willoughby Gray Goose II
- Willoughby Pelican
- Willoughby War-Hawk
- Willoughby Biplane

=== Willoughby ===
(Willoughby Delta Company)

- Willoughby Delta 8

=== Wills Wing ===
(Santa Ana, California and later Orange, California, United States)

- Wills Wing Alpha
- Wills Wing Attack Duck
- Wills Wing Condor
- Wills Wing Duck
- Wills Wing Eagle
- Wills Wing Falcon
- Wills Wing Fusion
- Wills Wing Harrier
- Wills Wing HP
- Wills Wing HP AT
- Wills Wing Omega
- Wills Wing Omni
- Wills Wing RamAir
- Wills Wing Raven
- Wills Wing Skyhawk
- Wills Wing Spectrum
- Wills Wing Sport
- Wills Wing Sport American
- Wills Wing Sport AT
- Wills Wing SST
- Wills Wing Super Sport
- Wills Wing T2
- Wills Wing Talon
- Wills Wing U2
- Wills Wing Ultra Sport
- Wills Wing XC

=== Wilson ===
- Avid Flyer
- Wilson Global Explorer
- Wilson Private Explorer

=== Wilson ===
(John H Wilson, Middlesex Pennsylvania, United States)

- Wilson 1909 Biplane

=== Wilson ===
(Al & Herbert Wilson, Ocean Park California, United States)

- Wilson 1913 Biplane
- Wilson 1917 Monoplane

=== Wilson ===
(Wilson & Co, 529 W Douglas, Wichita Kansas, United States)

- Wilson Cadet

=== Wilson ===
((Dr Frank M) Wilson Aircraft Company, Los Angeles California, United States)

- Wilson Mid-Wing 3-B

=== Wilson ===
(James Wilson, Los Angeles California, United States)

- Wilson Baby Cyclone
- Wilson Li'l Rebel
- Wilson Sky Mouse

=== Windecker ===
(Windecker Industries Inc.)

- Windecker Eagle
- Windecker YE-5

=== Winds Italia ===
(Bologna, Italy)

- Winds Italia Airwalker
- Winds Italia Orbiter
- Winds Italia Raven

=== Windstar ===
(Windstar, Boise Idaho, United States)

- Windstar YF-80

=== Windspire ===
(Windspire Inc.)

- Windspire Aeros

=== Windtech Parapentes ===
(Gijón, Spain)

- Windtech Altair
- Windtech Ambar
- Windtech Arial
- Windtech Bali
- Windtech Bantoo
- Windtech Cargo
- Windtech Combat
- Windtech Coral
- Windtech Evo
- Windtech Fenix
- Windtech Honey
- Windtech Impulse
- Windtech Kali
- Windtech Kinetik
- Windtech Loop
- Windtech Nitro
- Windtech Pulsar
- Windtech Quarx
- Windtech Ru-bi
- Windtech Serak
- Windtech Silex
- Windtech Spiro
- Windtech Syncro
- Windtech Tactic
- Windtech Tecno
- Windtech Tempest
- Windtech Tempus
- Windtech Tonic
- Windtech Tuareg
- Windtech Tucan
- Windtech Windy
- Windtech Zenith
- Windtech Zephyr

=== Windward Performance ===
- Windward Performance Perlan II
- Windward Performance SparrowHawk
- Windward Performance DuckHawk

=== Wing ===
((George S) Wing Aircraft Co/Hi-Shear Corp, 2660 Skypark Dr, Torrance California, United States)

- Wing D-1 Derringer
- Wing D-2M Derringer COIN

=== Wingco ===
- Wingco Atlantica

=== Wingler ===
(Wingler Aeronautical Co, Riverside Iowa, United States)

- Wingler S-2

Founded by Frank Joseph Wingler

=== Wings of Change ===
(Fulpmes, Austria)

- Skyman Amicus
- Skyman The Rock
- Skyman CrossCountry
- Skyman Heartbeat
- Skyman CrossAlps
- Skyman PassengAir
- Skyman Tandem
- Skyman Reinhold II
- Skyman Furio
- Wings of Change Acrominator
- Wings of Change Braveheart
- Wings of Change Chinhook Bi
- Wings of Change Crossblade
- Wings of Change Deathblade
- Wings of Change Druid
- Wings of Change Edonis
- Wings of Change Reinhold
- Wings of Change Ötzi
- Wings of Change Predator
- Wings of Change Psychohammer
- Wings of Change Speedy Gonzales
- Wings of Change Taifun
- Wings of Change Tsunami
- Wings of Change Tuareg
- Wings of Change Twister
- Wings of Change X-Fighter
- Wings of Change XPlor-air

=== Wings Of Freedom ===
(Wings Of Freedom LLC, Hubbard, Ohio, United States)

- Wings of Freedom Flitplane
- Wings of Freedom Phoenix 103

=== Wingler ===
- Wingler S-2

=== Winicki ===
- Winicki helicopter

=== Winner ===
(Winner SCS)

- Winner B150

=== Winslow ===
(Capt Stewart V Winslow, Lewistown Montana, United States)

- Winslow 1904 Monoplane

=== Winstead ===
( (Carl & Guy) Winstead Brothers Airplane Co, Wichita Kansas, United States)

- Winstead Special

=== Winton ===
(Scott Winton)

- Winton Sapphire 10
- Winton Sapphire LSA

=== Wipaire ===
(Wipaire Inc.)

- Wipaire Super Beaver
- Wipaire Boss Turbo-Beaver

=== Wise ===
(Ralph Wise, United States)

- Wise GT-400

=== Wiseman ===
(Fred Wiseman & M W Peters, San Francisco and Petaluma California, United States)

- Wiseman 1910 Biplane
- Noonan-Wiseman 1911 Biplane

=== Wisenant ===
(Oscar H Wisenant, Colorado Springs Colorado, United States)

- Wisenant 1920 Monoplane

=== Wissler ===
((Clarence H) Wissler Airplane Co, Bellefontaine Ohio, United States)

- Wissler WA-6
- Wissler WA-9

=== Wittemann-Lewis ===
(Wittemann-Lewis Aircraft Co Inc.)

- Wittemann 1907 Biplane
- Wittemann 1907 Triplane
- Wittemann 1911 Biplane
- Wittemann-Lewis 1923 Biplane
- Wittemann-Lewis Barling NBL-1
- Wittemann-Lewis T-T

=== Wittman ===
(Steve J. Wittman)

- Wittman Tailwind
- Wittman Midwing
- Wittman Big X
- Wittman Chief Oshkosh
- Wittman Buster
- Wittman Hardly-Ableson
- Wittman 0&0 Special
- Wittman V-Witt
- Wittman DFA a.k.a. Little Bonzo
- Wittman D-12 Bonzo
- Wittman W-5 Buttercup
- Wittman W-8 Tailwind
- Wittman W-9 Tailwind
- Wittman W-10 Tailwind

=== Wiweko ===
(Wiweko Soepono)

- Wiweko Wel-1

=== Wixon ===
(H H Wixon, Chicago Illinois, United States)

- Wixon 1907 Monoplane

=== Witzig-Lioré-Dutilleul ===
- Witzig-Lioré-Dutilleul n° 1
- Witzig-Lioré-Dutilleul n° 2

=== W.K.F. ===
(Wiener Karosserie und Flugzeugfabrik)

- W.K.F. 80.01
- W.K.F. 80.02
- W.K.F. 80.03
- W.K.F. 80.04
- W.K.F. 80.05
- W.K.F. 80.06 (D.I)
- W.K.F. 80.06B (D.I)
- W.K.F. 80.07
- W.K.F. 80.08
- W.K.F. 80.09
- W.K.F. 80.10
- W.K.F. 80.12
- W.K.F. series 81 (Knoller C.II(WKF))
- W.K.F. series 82 (Lloyd C.V(WKF))
- W.K.F. series 83 (Aviatik C.I(WKF))
- W.K.F. series 84 (Aviatik D.I(WKF))
- W.K.F. 85 (D.I)
- W.K.F. series 184 (Aviatik D.I(WKF))
- W.K.F. series 284 (Aviatik D.I(WKF))
- W.K.F. series 384 (Aviatik D.I(WKF))
- W.K.F. C.I
- W.K.F. D.I (80.06B)

=== WLT ===
(Wolfsberg Letecká Továrna s.r.o.) Czech Republic later Wolfsberg Aircraft s.r.o.

- WLT Sparrow

=== WNF ===
(Wiener Neustädter Flugzeugwerke GmbH)

- WNF Wn 11
- WNF Wn 15
- WNF Wn 16 (Salmson)
- WNF Wn 16 (Hirth)
- Doblhoff WNF 342

=== Wogen ===
(Orville Wogen, Lake Mills Iowa, United States)

- Wogen Sport Wing

=== Wolf ===
(Donald S Wolf, Huntington New York, United States)

- Wolf W-11 Boredom Fighter

=== Wolf ===
(Steve Wolf)

- Wolf Cyclone

=== Wolff ===
(Albert Wolff, Denver Colorado, United States)

- Wolff S-12

=== Wolford-Wilson ===
(Dale Wolford & Elmer Wilson )

- Wolford-Wilson Sailwing

=== Wolfsberg ===
(Wolfsberg Aircraft Corp. NV / Wolfsberg-Evektor / Wolfsberg Letecká Tovarna s.r.o.) Czech Republic

- Wolfsberg 257 Raven (initial design)
- Wolfsberg-Evektor Raven (second company)
- Wolfsberg Corvus 1F (third company)

=== Wolverine ===
(Wolverine Aeronautic Co, Albion Michigan, United States)

- Wolverine 25hp Biplane
- Wolverine 30hp Biplane

=== Wombat ===
- Wombat Gyrocopters Wombat

=== Wood ===
(Charles A Wood, Clay Center Kansas, United States)

- Wood CR-1 Little Monster

=== Wood ===
(Dick Wood, Kansas City Missouri, United States)

- Wood Liten Vinge

=== Wood ===
(Callbie Wood, Wilson North Carolina, United States)

- Wood CF-1
- Wood CF-4 Four-Runner

=== Wood ===
(Stanley Wood, Glendale Arizona, United States)

- Wood SL-1

=== Wood ===
(Steven K. Wood)

- Wood Sky Pup

=== Wood & English ===
(Thomas W Wood & Noel L English, Wiggins Mississippi, United States)

- Wood & English 1935 Monoplane

=== Woodford ===
((Edwin S) Woodford Airplanes Inc., Portland Oregon, United States)

- Woodford Special

=== Woodson ===
(Woodson Aircraft Corp, Bryan Ohio, United States)

- Woodson Express 2-A
- Woodson Foto
- Woodson M-6
- Woodson Sport 3-A
- Woodson Transport 4-B

=== Woodward ===
- Woodward Aero Navigator

=== World ===
(World Aircraft Company, Paris, Tennessee, United States)

- World Aircraft Spirit
- World Aircraft Vision
- World Aircraft Freedom
- World Aircraft Surveyor
- World Aircraft Sentinel

=== World Seair ===
(Edgewater, Florida, United States)

- World Seair Corp Seair

=== World War I Aeroplanes ===
(World War I Aeroplanes, Inc, Poughkeepsie, New York, United States)

- World War I Aeroplanes Fokker D.VII

=== Worldwide Ultralite ===
(Worldwide Ultralite Industries)

- Worldwide Ultralite Clipper
- Worldwide Ultralite Skyraider S/S
- Worldwide Ultralite Spitfire

=== Worsell ===
(Tom Worsell)

- Worsell Monoplane

=== Wouters ===
(Jean de Wouters d'Oplinter)

- Wouters W.4

=== Wozniak ===
(Frank B. Wozniak)

- Wozniak Double Eagle

=== Wren ===
- Wren Goldcrest

=== Wren ===
- Wren 460
- Wren 460P
- Wren 460 Beta STOL

=== Wright ===
(Wright Aeronautical)

- Wright Flyer I
- Wright Flyer II
- Wright Flyer III
- Wright Model A
- Wright Military Flyer
- Wright Model A(Transitional Model)
- Wright Aeroboat
- Wright AH
- Wright AO-3 Mohawk (Dayton-Wright XO-3 in use as an engine test-bed a.k.a. Iron Horse)
- Wright Astra
- Wright Model B
- Wright B-1
- Wright B-2
- Wright B-3
- Wright Baby Grand
- Wright Baby Wright
- Wright R Roadster
- Wright BB
- Wright Model C
- Wright CH Hydroaeroplane
- Wright Model D Scout
- Wright Model E
- Wright EX Vin Fiz
- Wright Model F Tin Cow
- Wright Model G Aeroboat
- Wright Model H
- Wright HS
- Wright Model I (a.k.a. Coastal Defence Hydro)
- Wright Model J (a.k.a. Long Bull)
- Wright Model K
- Wright Model L
- Wright Racer
- Wright Model V
- Wright WP
- Wright Model X
- Wright F2W
- Wright F3W Apache
- Wright NW
- Wright SDW

=== Wright ===
((H W) Wright & Co, Wilmar California, United States)

- Wright Light Sport

=== Wright ===
(Dr Thomas Edward A Wright, Wichita Kansas, United States)

- Wright Experimental

=== Wright ===
(A F Wright, Dubuque Iowa, United States)

- Wright 1932 Monoplane

=== Wright ===
(James R Wright, St Clair Shores Michigan, United States)

- Wright 1933 Biplane

=== Wright-Bellanca ===
- Wright-Bellanca WB-1
- Wright-Bellanca WB-2

=== Wright-Gingerich ===
(Harvey C Wright, Iowa City Iowa, United States)

- Wright-Gingerich HS

=== Wright-Hughes ===
((James) Wright Machine Tool Co, Cottage Grove Oregon, United States)

- Wright-Hughes H-1B

=== Wright-Martin ===
- Wright-Martin M-8
- Wright-Martin R
- Wright-Martin Pulitzer Racer
- Wright-Martin V

=== Wright Redux ===
(Wright Redux Assn, Glen Ellyn Illinois, United States)

- Wright Redux Flyer

=== Wrobel ===
(Gerard Wrobel, Beynes, Alpes-de-Haute-Provence, France)

- Wrobel Vroby 2

=== Wüst ===
(Aschaffenburg, Germany)

- Wüst Seahawk

=== Wyandotte ===
(Wyandotte High School, Kansas City Kansas, United States)

- Wyandotte Pup

=== Wysong ===
(Forrest E Wysong, Raleigh North Carolina, United States)

- Wysong 1915 Biplane
