= Whigham =

Whigham may refer to:

== Places ==
- Whigham, Georgia, US, a city

== People ==
- Whigham (surname)

== Other ==
- Whigham GW-1, glider
- Whigham GW-2, glider
- Whigham GW-3, glider
- Whigham GW-4, glider
- Whigham GW-5, glider
- Whigham GW-6, glider
- Whigham GW-7, glider

== See also ==
- Wigham (disambiguation)
