= Skyman =

Skyman may refer to:

== Fictional characters and media ==
- Skyman (Columbia Comics), a comic book superhero
- Skyman (film), a 2019 American science fiction-found footage horror film
- Skyman (DC Comics), a DC Comics character
  - Sylvester Pemberton, a DC comics character and one of the people to be called Skyman
- Skyman, a character in the manga/anime series Kinnikuman
- Skyman, a BBC1 radio series by Mark Radcliffe
- The Skyman a 1948 Australian comic strip by Yaroslav Horak
- Skyman, a comic book series by Dark Horse Comics

== People ==
- "Skyman", nickname of Philip Orin Parmelee (1887–1912), American aviator
- "Skyman", stage name for Guillaume Faye
- "SkyMan", nickname of a member of the Rain City Superhero Movement

== Other ==
- Skyman, a flying platform for Steadicam operators for which Garrett Brown received a Technical Academy Award
- Skyman, a series of aircraft built by Austrian aircraft manufacturer Wings of Change
