= RDW =

RDW, or rdw, may refer to:

- RDW (Dienst Wegverkeer), the organization that administers vehicle registration and driving licences in the Netherlands
- Red blood cell distribution width, a parameter reported in blood tests
- Reading West railway station (National Rail code), Berkshire, UK
- Red Wing station (Amtrak code), Minnesota, US
- Redrow (London Stock Exchange code), British housebuilder
- Ruda (deity), frequently rendered as rḍw in Safaitic inscriptions

== See also ==
- Wier RDW-2 Draggin' Fly, American light aircraft
