= Whigham (surname) =

Whigham is a surname, and may refer to:

- Byrd Whigham (1933–2017), American baseball player and college football coach
- David Whigham (1832–1906) was a Scottish advocate and cricketer
- Edward Whigham (1750–1823), Scottish bibliophile and friend of Robert Burns
- Giorgia Whigham (born 1997), American actress
- H. J. Whigham (1869–1954), Scottish writer and golfer
- Jiggs Whigham (born 1943), American jazz trombonist
- Larry Whigham (born 1972), American football player
- Margaret Whigham, second married name Margaret Campbell, Duchess of Argyll (1912–1993), Scottish socialite
- Peter Whigham (1925–1987), English poet
- Robert Whigham (1865–1950), British Army general
- Shea Whigham (born 1969), American actor
- Sybil Whigham (1871–c.1954), Scottish golfer
- Willie Whigham (1939–2021), Scottish football goalkeeper

== See also ==
- Wigham
