= Welch Aircraft Company =

- Formerly: Orin Welch Aircraft Company; Welch Aircraft Industries
- Industry: Aerospace
- Founder: Orin Welch
- Defunct: 1944
- Fate: Bankrupt
- Headquarters: Anderson, Indiana, United States

== History ==
The Orin Welch Aircraft Company was originally located in Charleston, West Virginia. It purchased the holdings of the Muncie Aerial Company in 1928. In 1929, it inaugurated a new airfield southwest of Anderson, Indiana. Later that year, it would be purchased by the city. Unfortunately, fire destroyed the plant in 1930. As a result, it eventually moved to Bendix Municipal Airport in South Bend, Indiana in 1936. By 1939, it had been renamed Welch Aircraft Industries. It was then acquired by the Aircraft Corporation of La Porte, Indiana in 1940. It was then moved to the Wyoming Valley Airport near Wilkes Barre, Pennsylvania. By 1941, it was planned for a new factory to be located in Exeter, Pennsylvania. With the beginning of World War II production of aircraft ceased and Orin Welch joined the Air Corps Ferrying Command in March 1942. One year later his airplane disappeared while flying the Hump. Shortly thereafter, a proposal was made to relocate to Scranton, Pennsylvania. However, in 1944 the company went bankrupt.

== Aircraft ==
Model name	First flight	Number built	Type
Welch OW-1	1927	4	Single engine biplane utility airplane
Welch OW-2	1928	2	Single engine biplane utility airplane
Welch OW-3	1928	3	Single engine biplane utility airplane
Welch OW-4	1929	1	Single engine monoplane utility airplane
Welch OW-5	1931	38	Single engine monoplane utility airplane
Welch OW-6		6	Single engine monoplane utility airplane
Welch OW-7		8	Single engine monoplane utility airplane
Welch OW-8		2	Single engine monoplane utility airplane
