= Wilson Private Explorer =

General information
- Type: Recreational aircraft
- National origin: United States
- Manufacturer: Dean W. Wilson
- Designer: Hubert de Chevigny
- Status: in service
- Primary user: private pilot owners
- Number built: at least 6

History
- Introduction date: 1998
- First flight: January 1998

The Wilson Private Explorer is an American-built recreational aircraft of the late 1990s.

== Development ==
The Private Explorer was designed by Hubert de Chevigny as a scaled-down single-engine version of his twin-engined Wilson Global Explorer. The Private Explorer is a strut braced high wing aircraft which utilises a tubular steel frame covered in fabric. The interior has four passenger seats in the front section and a rear accommodation compartment which contains a double bed and two armchairs.

The tricycle undercarriage is fixed and can be quickly removed for attachment of floats for operations off water. Various Lycoming engines have been fitted ranging from 235 to 300 hp (175 to 224 kW). The aircraft has an excellent short-field performance and an endurance of up to 8 hours. The aircraft is supplied to amateur constructors in kit form. The type has been tested with a Pratt & Whitney Canada PT6 turboprop engine.

== Operational history ==
The Private Explorer is used by individuals as an "airborne recreational vehicle" from both land and water bases. Two aircraft are currently (2010) registered in the United States.

== Specifications (variant) ==
Data from Simpson, 2001

General characteristics

- Crew: 2
- Capacity: 4 passengers
- Length: 29 ft 9 in (9.07 m)
- Wingspan: 47 ft 3 in (14.40 m)
- Height: 11 ft 2 in (3.40 m)
- Empty weight: 2,145 lb (973 kg)
- Gross weight: 4,102 lb (1,861 kg)
- Powerplant: 1 × Lycoming O-540 piston, 235 hp (175 kW)

Performance

- Maximum speed: 112 mph (180 km/h, 97 kn)
- Cruise speed: 100 mph (160 km/h, 87 kn)
- Range: 800 mi (1,300 km, 700 nmi)
- Endurance: 8 hours
- Rate of climb: 1,184 ft/min (6.01 m/s)
