= Weinberg S.E.5a Replica =

American homebuilt aircraft

S.E.5a Replica

General information
- Type: Homebuilt aircraft
- National origin: United States
- Designer: William Weinberg
- Status: Production completed
- Number built: at least one

The Weinberg S.E.5a Replica is an American homebuilt biplane that was designed by William Weinberg of Kansas City, Missouri. The aircraft was supplied in the form of plans for amateur construction, but the plans seem to no longer be available.

The Weinberg S.E.5a Replica is an 80% replica of the First World War Royal Aircraft Factory S.E.5a fighter aircraft.

== Design and development ==
Like the original S.E.5a fighter, the S.E.5a Replica features a biplane layout, a single-seat open cockpit, fixed conventional landing gear and a single engine in tractor configuration.

The aircraft is predominantly made from wood with the aft fuselage and tail made from welded steel tubing. The 22.0 ft (6.7 m) span wings are built with wooden spars, wooden ribs and center-section. The wings, tail and aft fuselage are covered in doped aircraft fabric, with the forward fuselage covered in plywood. There is a small baggage compartment behind the pilot's seat.

The aircraft has an empty weight of 900 lb (410 kg) and a gross weight of 1,100 lb (500 kg), giving a useful load of 200 lb (91 kg). With full fuel of 24 U.S. gallons (91 L; 20 imp gal) the payload is only 66 lb (30 kg).

== Operational history ==
At least one example was constructed in 1970 and registered with the US Federal Aviation Administration as an Experimental - Amateur-built. The aircraft was removed from the registry on 30 April 2016.

== Specifications (S.E.5a Replica) ==
Data from Plane and Pilot

General characteristics

- Crew: one
- Length: 18 ft 0 in (5.49 m)
- Wingspan: 22 ft 0 in (6.71 m)
- Empty weight: 900 lb (408 kg)
- Gross weight: 1,100 lb (499 kg)
- Fuel capacity: 24 U.S. gallons (91 L; 20 imp gal)
- Powerplant: 1 × aircraft engine
- Propellers: 2-bladed wooden

Performance

- Maximum speed: 95 mph (153 km/h, 83 kn)
- Cruise speed: 85 mph (137 km/h, 74 kn)
- Stall speed: 50 mph (80 km/h, 43 kn)
- Rate of climb: 600 ft/min (3.0 m/s)

Armament

- Guns: one replica Vickers machine gun and one replica Lewis gun.
