= Welch OW-1 =

1920s American utility biplane aircraft

General information
- Type: Three-seat open biplane
- National origin: United States
- Manufacturer: Orin Welch Aircraft Company
- Designer: Orin Moore Welch
- Number built: 5

History
- First flight: 1927

The Welch OW-1 and the similar OW-2 were American three-seat open biplanes designed by Orin Welch in the late 1920s. The OW-1 was powered with a 90 hp (67 kW) Curtiss OX-5 and the OW-2 was powered by a 150 hp (110 kW) Hispano-Suiza 8A, both of which were water-cooled V-8 aero engines. Four OW-1s were built (NC817, NC4205, NC5105, NC6838), one of which was converted into the first of two OW-2s. The first OW-2 was later modified into a 5-seater, before being destroyed in a hangar fire in November 1929. The second OW-2 was given the civil registration NC11142.

== Specifications ==
Data from

General characteristics

- Crew: 1 (pilot)
- Capacity: 2
- Length: 24 ft 2 in (7.37 m)
- Wingspan: 31 ft 2 in (9.50 m)
- Powerplant: 1 × Curtiss OX-5 , 90 hp (67 kW)

Performance

- Maximum speed: 105 mph (169 km/h, 91 kn)
