= Western Airplane King Bird =

King Bird
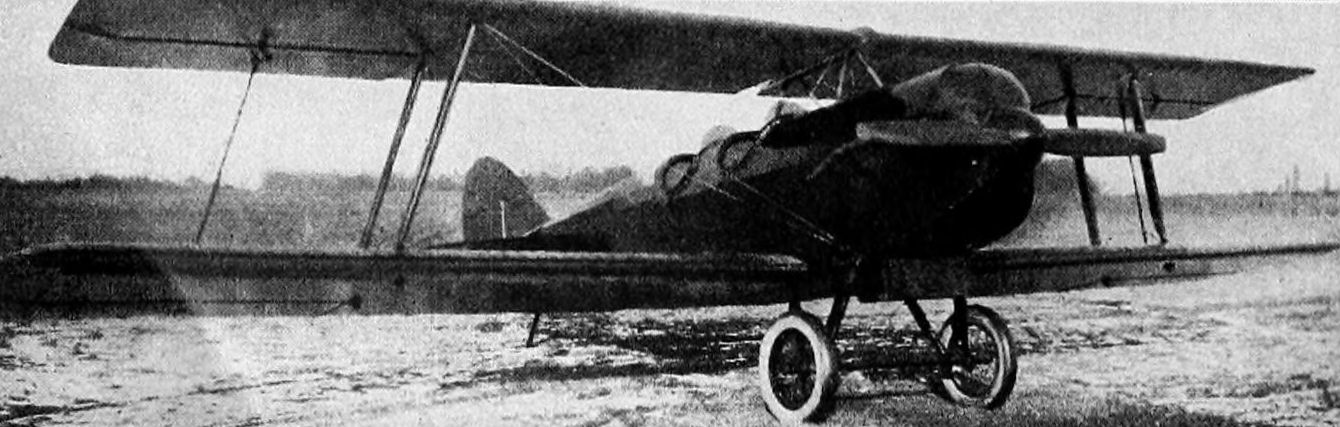

General information
- Type: three passenger transport
- National origin: US
- Manufacturer: Western Airplane Co., Chicago
- Number built: 1

History
- First flight: late 1926-January 1927

The Western Airplane King Bird, named after the tyrant flycatcher (Western) Kingbird, was a 1920s US civil transport accommodating three passengers in open cockpits. Only one was built.

== Design and development ==
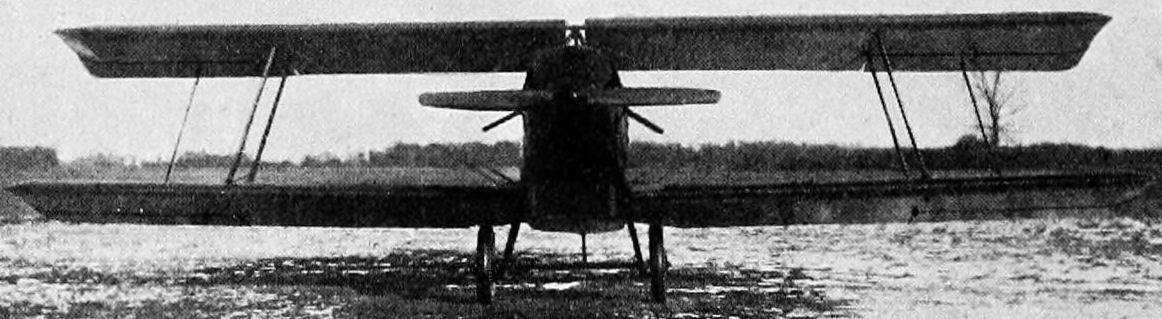

The King Bird was a single bay biplane with wings of rectangular plan. The areas of the upper and lower wings were equal but the lower span was 3 ft (0.91 m) greater as they were attached to the fuselage rather than joined directly. They were braced together by inward-leaning, parallel pairs of interplane struts and supported over the fuselage on short, inverted-V cabane struts, producing a 5 ft (1.5 m) gap with 10 in (250 mm) stagger. Only the lower wing was set with dihedral (3°). Ailerons on upper and lower wings were externally interconnected.

The King Bird's fuselage had a welded steel tube structure, with the engine on a bolt-on forward frame so that various types could be fitted. The prototype was equipped with a readily available Curtiss OX-5, a 90 hp (67 kW), water-cooled V-8. Each bank of cylinder heads had its own cowling and long exhaust pipes extended away from and below the fuselage. There were two open cockpits, each with bench seats for two, the forward one under the upper trailing edge. It was normally flown from the port side, rear seat but a second set of controls could be added to the other rear seat for pilot training. The elevator was ground adjustable, though production aircraft would have offered an in-flight adjustable option. The rounded, balanced rudder also had a steel tube structure.

The King Bird's fixed undercarriage was conventional for the time, with wire-spoked, rubber-tyred wheels on a single axle which was mounted on short main legs with trailing drag struts.

== Operational history ==
The King Bird was first flown before February 1927. By then it had been flown by several pilots, who commented on its good handling and quick rate of climb after take-off. Despite the good reports, only one was built.

== Specifications ==
Data from Aero Digest (1927)

General characteristics

- Crew: one
- Capacity: three passengers
- Length: 25 ft 4 in (7.72 m)
- Upper wingspan: 32 ft (9.8 m)
- Lower wingspan: 35 ft (11 m)
- Height: 9 ft (2.7 m)
- Wing area: 160 sq ft (15 m^{2}) each wing
- Airfoil: W.A.C.
- Empty weight: 1,200 lb (544 kg)
- Gross weight: 2,000 lb (907 kg)
- Powerplant: 1 × Curtiss OX-5 water cooled V-8, 90 hp (67 kW) at 1,400 rpm
- Propellers: 2-bladed

Performance

- Maximum speed: 95 mph (153 km/h, 83 kn) at sea level
- Cruise speed: 85 mph (137 km/h, 74 kn)
- Endurance: 5 hr
- Service ceiling: 1,200 ft (370 m)
- Time to altitude: 1 min to 600 ft (180 m)
- Landing speed: 30 mph (48 km/h; 26 kn)
