= Whitcraft Model 165 =

Model 165
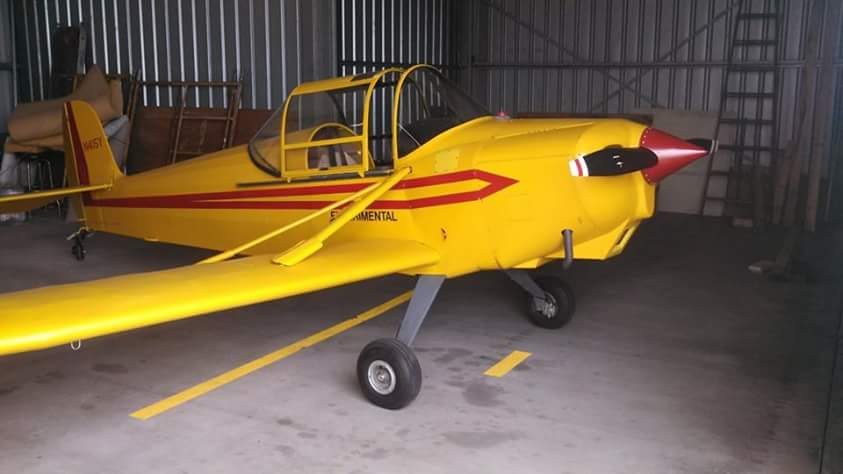

General information
- Type: Single-seat homebuilt sporting aircraft
- National origin: United States
- Manufacturer: Whitcraft Corporation
- Designer: Mickey Whittenburg
- Number built: 1

History
- First flight: 1965

The Whitcraft Model 165 was an American single-seat homebuilt sporting aircraft designed by Mickey Whittenburg and built by him over a ten-year period, first flying in 1965.

== Design ==
The Model 165 is a strut-braced, low-wing monoplane made with welded steel-tube fuselage along with a fabric covering. The wing is a conventional light alloy structure with a fabric covering with vee-bracing strut on each side, ailerons but no flaps. The aircraft is powered by a 65 hp (48 kW) Continental A-65 air-cooled engine driving a two-bladed fixed-pitch tractor propeller. The pilot has an enclosed cockpit with a rearward-sliding transparent canopy, the landing gear is a fixed tailwheel type.

== Specifications ==
Data from Jane's All the World's Aircraft 1973-74

General characteristics

- Crew: 1
- Length: 17 ft 6 in (5.33 m)
- Wingspan: 23 ft 8 in (7.21 m)
- Height: 5 ft 6 in (1.68 m)
- Wing area: 88 sq ft (8.18 m^{2})
- Empty weight: 606 lb (274 kg)
- Gross weight: 930 lb (421 kg)
- Powerplant: 1 × Continental A-65 four-cylinder, horizontally opposed and air-cooled piston , 65 hp (48 kW)

Performance

- Maximum speed: 120 mph (192 km/h, 100 kn)
- Cruise speed: 100 mph (161 km/h, 87 kn)
- Stall speed: 60 mph (97 km/h, 52 kn)
- Range: 250 mi (402 km, 220 nmi)
- Service ceiling: 9,000 ft (2,745 m)
- Rate of climb: 400 ft/min (2.0 m/s)
