= Warwick M-1 Tiny Champ =

M-1 Tiny Champ

General information
- Type: Homebuilt aircraft
- National origin: United States
- Designer: Bill Warwick
- Number built: 1

History
- First flight: 1 May 1960

The Warwick M-1 Tiny Champ is an American homebuilt aircraft that was designed by Bill Warwick and first flown on 1 May 1960.

== Design and development ==
The M-1 is a single engine, strut-braced, high wing, open cockpit, conventional landing gear-equipped aircraft. Doors and a rear window can be installed to create an enclosed cabin. The design won outstanding aircraft design at the Experimental Aircraft Association Airshow in 1960.

== Specifications (M-1 Tiny Champ) ==
Data from Flying Magazine

General characteristics

- Crew: 1
- Wingspan: 20 ft (6.1 m)
- Powerplant: 1 × Continental A65 horizontally opposed piston aircraft engine, 65 hp (48 kW)
- Propellers: 2-bladed

Performance
