= Waspair HM 81 Tomcat =

British ultralight aircraft

HM 81 Tomcat

General information
- Type: Ultralight aircraft
- National origin: United Kingdom
- Manufacturer: Waspair; Midwest Microlites
- Status: Production completed

History
- First flight: 1980

The Waspair HM 81 Tomcat is a British canard ultralight aircraft of unusual design, that was produced by Waspair and later Midwest Microlites. The designer is disputed and Chip Erwin, Larry Whiting and Robin Haynes are all named as designers. The aircraft was supplied as a kit for amateur construction.

== Design and development ==
The aircraft was designed to comply with the US FAR 103 Ultralight Vehicles rules, including the category's maximum empty weight of 254 lb (115 kg). The aircraft has a standard empty weight of 248 lb (112 kg). It features a high-wing supported by dihedral stabilizers, a single-seat, open cockpit, tricycle landing gear and a single engine in pusher configuration.

The aircraft structure is made from aluminum tubing. Its 30 ft (9.1 m) span wing sits high above the pilot's seat, providing pendulum stability. The controls are very unconventional and all are canard mounted, which has two surfaces. The canard surfaces move in unison to produce pitch and separately, in opposite directions, to produce roll. The large fixed dihedral stabilizers provide yaw control as the wing has no dihedral of its own for yaw coupling. The canard surfaces are mounted to the front of the main keel tube, which serves as a fuselage. The pilot is accommodated on an open seat bolted to the same tube. The Cuyuna 430 powerplant is located behind the pilot.

In service the control system has proved inadequate and the aircraft is difficult to control in flight, particularly in air that is not smooth and there have been a number of loss-of-control accidents. The Virtual Ultralight Museum describes the aircraft as "ungainly and unstable". Reviewer Andre Cliche says of the Tomcat's handling characteristics:

It uses a 2-axis control system in which the canard controls pitch and roll. There is no rudder to control yaw but the V-wing is supposed to provide yaw stability. This is a deficient system with problems especially in yaw. Any kind of upset initiated by the pilot or by turbulence could impart a sideways motion that the rudder effect of the V-wing is not strong enough to counteract. The pilot must deflect the canard surface in the opposite direction before the upset pushes the nose beyond the maximum recovery angle of the canard. If this is not done, the result could be a non-controllable spiral dive.

Cliche recommends that Tomcats be scrapped for parts and not flown.

An improved model, the Pintail, was later introduced by Haynes, which has control surfaces on the trailing edge of the dihedral stabilizers, but it is unclear if this fully addresses the original design's deficiencies.

== Variants ==
Tomcat Standard
Initial version with two-axis controls
Tomcat Sport
Improved version with two-axis controls
Tomcat Tourer
Two seat model with two-axis controls
Haynes Pintail
Improved version with three-axis controls

== Specifications (Pintail) ==
Data from Cliche

General characteristics

- Crew: one
- Wingspan: 31 ft (9.4 m)
- Empty weight: 245 lb (111 kg)
- Gross weight: 525 lb (238 kg)
- Fuel capacity: 5 U.S. gallons (19 L; 4.2 imp gal)
- Powerplant: 1 × Cuyuna 430 , 30 hp (22 kW)

Performance

- Maximum speed: 63 mph (101 km/h, 55 kn)
- Cruise speed: 55 mph (89 km/h, 48 kn)
- Stall speed: 26 mph (42 km/h, 23 kn)
- Rate of climb: 1,000 ft/min (5.1 m/s)
