= Wigham =

Wigham is a surname, and may refer to:

- Eliza Wigham (1820–1899), Scottish campaigner
- Gary Wigham (born 1961), English cricketer
- John Richardson Wigham (1829–1906), prominent lighthouse engineer of the 19th century
- Margaret Wigham (1904–1972) American composer, music educator, and pianist

== See also ==
- Wigham Richardson, shipbuilding company founded by John Wigham Richardson
- Whigham (disambiguation)
- Wickham (disambiguation)
