= Warwick W-4 Hot Canary =

W-4 Hot Canary
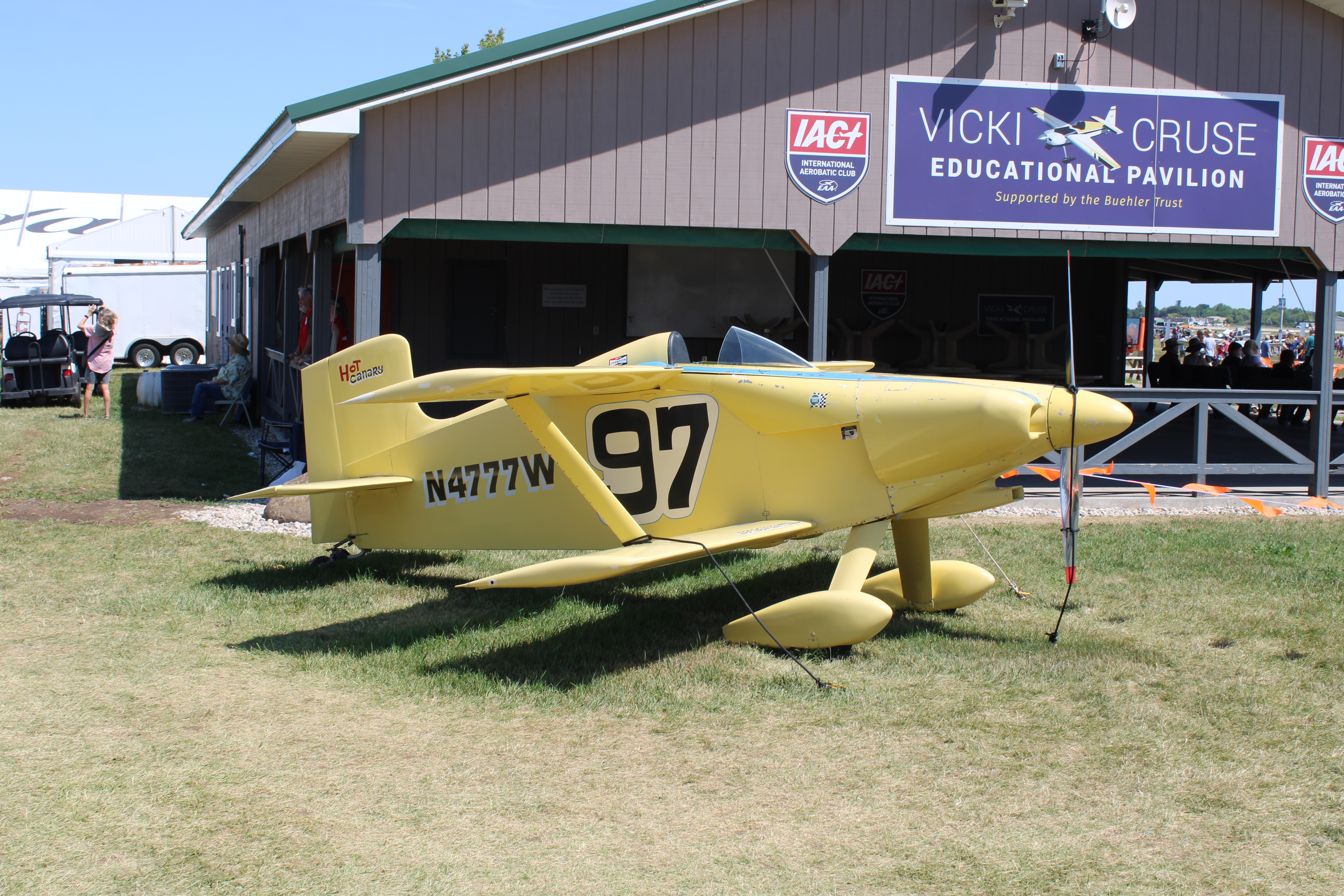
- W-4 Hot Canary

General information
- Type: Biplane racer
- National origin: United States
- Designer: William J. Warwick
- Number built: 1

History
- Introduction date: 1969

The W-4 Hot Canary is a custom biplane designed for air racing.

== Design ==
The W-4 is a single place conventional geared negative stagger biplane.

== Operational history ==
- 1970 Florida Sport Biplane consolation race - 1st place
- 1970 Reno Air Race - 4th place in biplane category - 163 mph average
- 1971 Reno Air Race

== Specifications (W-4 Hot Canary) ==
General characteristics

- Crew: 1
- Length: 17 ft (5.2 m)
- Wingspan: 16 ft (4.9 m) Reverse stagger
- Height: 5 ft 4 in (1.63 m)
- Empty weight: 705 lb (320 kg)
- Gross weight: 1,019 lb (462 kg)
- Powerplant: 1 × Lycoming 0-290-D2 Horizontally Opposed Piston, 125 hp (93 kW)
- Propellers: 2-bladed

Performance

- Maximum speed: 170 kn (196 mph, 315 km/h)
- Cruise speed: 130 kn (150 mph, 240 km/h)
- Range: 480 nmi (550 mi, 890 km)
