= Welch OW-3 =

General information
- Type: Two-seat parasol monoplane
- National origin: United States
- Manufacturer: Orin Welch Aircraft Company
- Designer: Orin Moore Welch
- Number built: 3 (2 OW-3 Hi-Lift, 1 OW-3M)

History
- First flight: 1928

The Welch OW-3 was a 2 to 3 seat, light airplane designed by Orin Welch in the late 1920s.

== Design ==
There were two versions of the OW-3. The OW-3 Hi-Lift variant (two built) was a two-seat, open cockpit biplane with a modified Standard J-1 fuselage that incorporated a Welch-designed high-lift wing. The OW-3M (only one built) was an open cockpit parasol monoplane that could seat three people.
