= Whigham GW-3 =

American glider

GW-3 and GW-4
- The prototype GW-3 that was destroyed in 1992.

General information
- Type: Glider
- National origin: United States
- Designer: Gene Whigham
- Status: No longer in production
- Number built: three

History
- First flight: 1965
- Developed from: Whigham GW-2

The Whigham GW-3 is a family of American mid-wing, single-seat, FAI Open Class gliders that was designed and constructed by Gene Whigham, a retired flight test engineer for Convair. It first flew in 1965.

== Design and development ==
The GW-3 was designed by Whigham as a glider that would be easy for a first time builder to complete and fly. As such the design emphasizes simplicity of construction to reduce building time. The GW-4 was a higher wing loading development.

The GW-3 and 4 both use a 54 ft (16.5 m) wing, with a NACA 43012A airfoil. The aircraft are all-metal, with the portion of the wing aft of the spar covered in doped aircraft fabric. The flaps and ailerons are sheet metal covered. The wing design is unusual as it uses a single spar and transmits its torsion and drag loads via a thick leading edge skin. This resulted in wings that weigh 100 lb (45 kg) each. The prototype GW-3 weighed 380 lb (172 kg) empty in total.

== Operational history ==
The prototype GW-3 was involved in an accident on 9 July 1992 when downdrafts were encountered in mountainous terrain. The aircraft was unable to return to the airport and crashed, resulting in serious injury to the pilot. It was removed from the Federal Aviation Administration registry on 13 September 1997 and listed as "destroyed".

== Variants ==
GW-3
Initial version with a 380 lb (172 kg) empty weight and 695 lb (315 kg) gross weight. One built and it was crashed on 9 July 1992, listed as destroyed and removed from the FAA registry 13 September 1997.
GW-4
Development of the GW-3 with higher wing loading, achieved with the same wing, but a higher gross weight of 760 lb (345 kg). One built and as of July 2011 this aircraft is no longer on the FAA registry.
GW-4A
Development of the GW-3. One built in 1977 and, as of July 2011, this aircraft remains on the FAA registry.

== Specifications (GW-3) ==
Data from Sailplane Directory and Soaring

General characteristics

- Crew: one
- Wingspan: 54 ft 0 in (16.46 m)
- Aspect ratio: 24:1
- Airfoil: NACA 43012A
- Empty weight: 380 lb (172 kg)
- Gross weight: 695 lb (315 kg)

Performance

- Maximum glide ratio: 35:1 at 48 mph (77 km/h)
- Rate of sink: 120 ft/min (0.61 m/s) at 43 mph (69 km/h)
- Wing loading: 5.7 lb/sq ft (28 kg/m^{2})

== See also ==
Related lists

- List of gliders
