= WKF D.I =

1910s Austria-Hungarian aircraft

General information
- Type: Biplane fighter
- National origin: Austria-Hungary
- Manufacturer: WKF
- Primary user: KuKLFT
- Number built: 49

History
- First flight: 1918

The WFK D.I (series 85) was a fighter aircraft built in Austria-Hungary in the final months of World War I.

== Operational history ==
The KuKLFT placed an order for 48 D.Is. However, only two aircraft were delivered by the time of the Armistice, and the rest were finished in December 1918-January 1919.

== Specifications (80.06b) ==
Data from

General characteristics

- Crew: 1
- Length: 7.10 m (23 ft 4 in)
- Wingspan: 8.80 m (28 ft 10 in)
- Empty weight: 732 kg (1,614 lb)
- Gross weight: 1,005 kg (2,216 lb)
- Powerplant: 1 × Hiero 6 six-cylinder water-cooled in-line piston engine, 170 kW (230 hp)
- Propellers: 2-bladed wooden fixed-pitch propeller

Performance

- Maximum speed: 195 km/h (121 mph, 105 kn)
- Cruise speed: 168 km/h (104 mph, 91 kn)
- Endurance: 2.30 hours
- Service ceiling: 6,500 m (21,300 ft)

Armament

- Guns: 2 x Synchronised fixed forward-firing 8 mm (0.315 in) Schwarzlose machine guns
