= Waterman Flex-Wing =

Flex-Wing
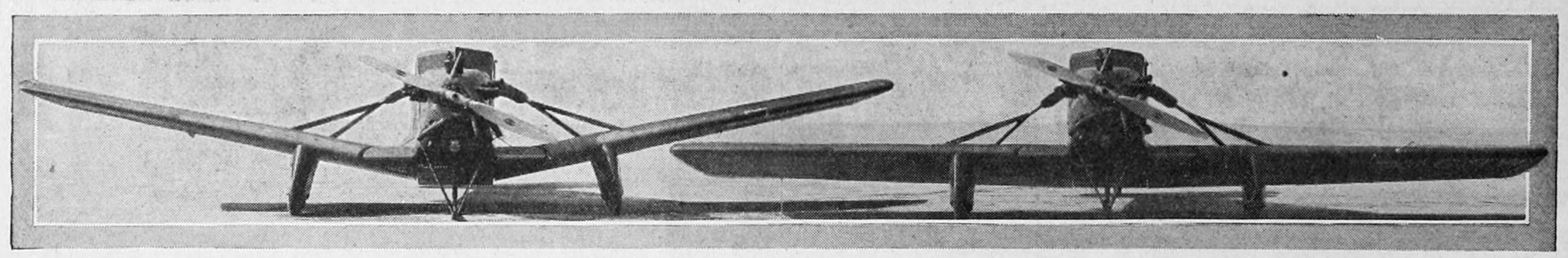
- FlexWing with wings in low- and high-incidence positions

General information
- Type: Experimental four place light transport
- National origin: United States
- Manufacturer: Waterman Aircraft
- Designer: Waldo Waterman
- Number built: 2

History
- First flight: 1930

The Waterman Flex-Wing was a four seat cabin aircraft designed to be easy for non-expert pilots to fly. Its principle safety features were based on a hinged wing providing controllable and interconnected dihedral and incidence. Two were built but the absence of funding in the difficult trading conditions of the Great Depression ended the project.

== Design and development ==
In the late 1920s Waldo Waterman saw a market opportunity for a four place cabin aeroplane that could be safely flown by amateur pilots with limited experience. The result was his Flex-Wing, also known as the CLM Special and the Variable Wing Monoplane. He started design studies in the spring of 1928 but its development led to a number of patent requests and it was not until December 1929 that he felt ready to make his design public.

Its principle innovation was having wings hinged from short stub wings at an angle of 25º to the direction of flight, so that as their dihedral increased the angle of incidence decreased. Each wing was braced from the upper fuselage to the wing spars with an asymmetric, inverted Y-strut with a pneumatic shock absorber strut in its central leg. Dihedral could be decreased and the angle of attack increased for take-off or landing by pumping air into these struts on each side, increasing low speed lift and so decreasing take-off and landing speeds and distances. In normal, higher speed flight the struts were shortened, reducing the angle of incidence and drag. Each wing's angle of incidence could still be changed, though damped by the shock absorber strut: if one wing was raised by a gust, its incidence and lift would decrease as it moved upwards, stabilizing the aircraft against roll. If both wings lost lift, the consequent extension of the strut and increase in incidence would restore it.

Ground handling safety was further improved by the Flex-Wing's fixed, wide track, wing-mounted landing gear and a 6 ft (1.8 m) long skid which was lowered with the wings for the approach, largely supporting the aircraft during the landing run and bringing it to a stop within about 40 ft (12 m). After landing the wings and skid could be raised and the Flex-Wing, with its weight on its wheels again, could taxi conventionally.

Apart from its wing-flexing mechanism and landing skid, photographs show the Flex-Wing was typical for its time. The low wing was essentially rectangular in plan and the fuselage was flat-sided, with its five-cylinder radial engine mounted in the nose. Originally this was a 125 hp (93 kW) Kinner B-5 but by the autumn of 1930 this had been replaced by the new 190 hp (140 kW) Kinner C-5. In its latter form the aircraft was known as the W-1. The pilot's enclosed cockpit was ahead of the wing leading edge with the cabin behind it lit by three windows on each side, two for each passenger, and accessed by a port side door. The fuselage tapered strongly toward the conventional tail. Its fin had a cropped triangular profile and was braced to the tailplane, mounted on top of the fuselage. There was a full, rounded and balanced rudder.

== Variants ==
Flex-Wing, CLM Special or Variable Wing Monoplane
1930, 125 hp (93 kW) Kinner B-5 engine.
W-1 and W-1 Special
1931, Flex-Wing re-engined with 190 hp (140 kW) Kinner C-5 engine. The Special was a second airframe, similarly powered.

== Specifications (Waterman W-1) ==
Data from Aero Digest, October 1930

General characteristics

- Crew: one
- Capacity: three passengers
- Length: 27 ft 5 in (8.36 m)
- Wingspan: 40 ft (12 m)
- Height: 7 ft 6 in (2.29 m)
- Wing area: 212 sq ft (19.7 m^{2})
- Empty weight: 2,050 lb (930 kg)
- Gross weight: 3,250 lb (1,474 kg)
- Useful load: 1,200 lb (540 kg)
- Powerplant: 1 × Kinner C-5 five cylinder radial, 190 hp (140 kW)
- Propellers: 2-bladed

Performance

- Maximum speed: 140 mph (230 km/h, 120 kn)
- Cruise speed: 110 mph (180 km/h, 96 kn)
- Landing speed: 45 mph (72 km/h; 39 kn)
- Take-off time with full load: 9.5 s
- Take-off run: 225 ft (69 m)
- Service ceiling: 17,000 ft (5,200 m)
