= Wacyk-Tyrala WT-1 =

WT-1

General information
- Type: Sports aircraft
- National origin: Poland
- Designer: Stanisław Wacyk and Tadeuz Tyrala
- Number built: 1

History
- First flight: mid–1931

The WT-1 was a 1931 high performance sports aircraft designed in Poland. It only made two flights.

== Design and development ==
Stanisław Wacyk and Tadeuz Tyrala designed the WT-1 during 1930 and they largely financed the construction of its fuselage at the Aviation Circle of the Industrial School at Kraków and wings in the workshops of the Kraków Air Regiment. It was completed in the summer of 1931.

The high performance sports aircraft was an aerodynamically clean cantilever wing monoplane. Its high-mounted, one piece wing was built around two spars, with a plywood covered leading edge and fabric covering. Narrow chord ailerons occupied the whole of the trailing edges.

The WT-1's borrowed 67–73 kW (90–98 hp) de Havilland Gipsy I four cylinder upright inline engine was mounted largely exposed, though with a fairing behind it. The ply-covered fuselage had rounded decking; the fuel tank was in the forward fuselage and its two seat, side-by-side cockpit was behind the wing trailing edge. The fuselage tapered rearwards, with the tailplane mounted on top. A tall triangular fin carried a rounded rudder, which reached down to the keel. Its fixed landing gear was conventional, though details are not known.

An initial first flight was abandoned due to a fuel supply problem. The system was modified and a new fuel pump fitted, after which Stanisław Szubka piloted its first flight, finding the WT-1 hard to fly because of a misplaced centre of gravity (c.g.), and damaging it on landing. After accident repair and c.g. adjustment the WT-1 was flown by Jerzy Bajan. The take-off run was short and performance high, but Bajan found its handling dangerous. At this point the loaned Gipsy engine had to be returned to the Kraków Air Regiment and the development of the WT-1 was abandoned.

== Specifications ==
Data from Samolotypolskie.pl

General characteristics

- Crew: One
- Capacity: One passenger
- Length: 6.2 m (20 ft 4 in)
- Wingspan: 8.5 m (27 ft 11 in)
- Height: 2.0 m (6 ft 7 in)
- Wing area: 10 m^{2} (110 sq ft)
- Empty weight: 260 kg (573 lb)
- Gross weight: 410 kg (904 lb)
- Powerplant: 1 × de Havilland Gipsy I 4-cylinder upright inline engine, 67–73 kW (90–98 hp)
- Propellers: 2-bladed Schwartz

Performance

- Maximum speed: 210 km/h (130 mph, 110 kn)
- Cruise speed: 180 km/h (110 mph, 97 kn)
- Stall speed: 90 km/h (56 mph, 49 kn) minimum speed
- Range: 700 km (430 mi, 380 nmi)
- Service ceiling: 3,000 m (9,800 ft)
- Rate of climb: 2.5 m/s (490 ft/min)
