= WNF Wn 16 =

Austrian experimental aircraft

Wn 16

General information
- Type: Experimental aircraft
- National origin: Austria
- Manufacturer: Wiener Neustädter Flugzeugwerke GmbH (WNF)
- Designer: Erich Meindl
- Number built: 1

History
- First flight: 23 September 1939

The WNF Wn 16 was an Austrian experimental aircraft built near the start of World War II to test a tricycle undercarriage.

== Design ==
The WNF Wn 16, originally built as the Meindl-van Nes A.XV (aka Meindl M.15), was an Austrian experimental aircraft built in the late 1930s for tricycle undercarriage research. It was a swept wing tandem two-seater, with a pusher configuration engine and twin-boom fuselage. Its cantilever low wing had straight edges and 18.33° of sweep at quarter chord. The wing was in three parts, with a twin spar, steel tube framed centre section welded to the central fuselage which supported the tailbooms on its upper surfaces at their outer ends. The ribs were also formed from steel tube. The forward part of the centre section was plywood covered, with fabric aft. The outer wing panels were ply covered, each with a single wooden single spar. There was a split flap over the whole centre section trailing edge and slotted ailerons which filled the trailing edges of the outer panels.

The short fuselage was also a welded steel tube structure, alloy skinned front and rear but with a fabric covered central section that contained the tandem seats under a continuous, multi-framed canopy which merged into the rear fuselage. The Wn 16's pusher configuration, 37 kW (50 hp) Salmson 9Ad nine cylinder radial engine was installed within a Townend ring cowling at the rear of the fuselage beyond the wing, driving a two blade propeller. The Wn 16 was later re-engined with a 45 kW (60 hp) Walter Mikron.

The Wn 16's tail-booms were wooden monocoques. The rectangular tail-plane and elevator were on top of them, with oval vertical tails acting as end-plates; the fins had ply covered wooden frames and the rudders had fabric covered steel frames.

Its tricycle gear was fixed, all units with bungee cord shock absorbers. Both legs and wheels were enclosed in streamlined fairings. The nosewheel was steerable via the rudder pedals.

The Wn 16 flew for the first time on 23 September 1939. Development continued into World War II and the first flight with the Walter engine was on 7 August 1942.

== Specifications ==
Data from Heinz J. Navarra (1988)

General characteristics

- Crew: Two
- Length: 7.27 m (23 ft 10 in)
- Wingspan: 9.84 m (32 ft 3 in)
- Height: 1.80 m (5 ft 11 in)
- Wing area: 13.50 m^{2} (145.3 sq ft)
- Empty weight: 350 kg (772 lb)
- Gross weight: 550 kg (1,213 lb)
- Fuel capacity: 38 L (8.4 imp gal; 10 US gal)
- Powerplant: 1 × Salmson 9Ad 9-cylinder radial, 37 kW (50 hp)
- Propellers: 2-bladed

Performance

- Maximum speed: 160 km/h (99 mph, 86 kn) at sea level
- Cruise speed: 145 km/h (90 mph, 78 kn)
- Range: 400 km (250 mi, 220 nmi)
- Service ceiling: 2,800 m (9,200 ft) service
- Rate of climb: 2.2 m/s (430 ft/min)
- Landing speed: 65 km/h (40 mph)
