= Wendt WH-1 Traveler =

WH-1 Traveler
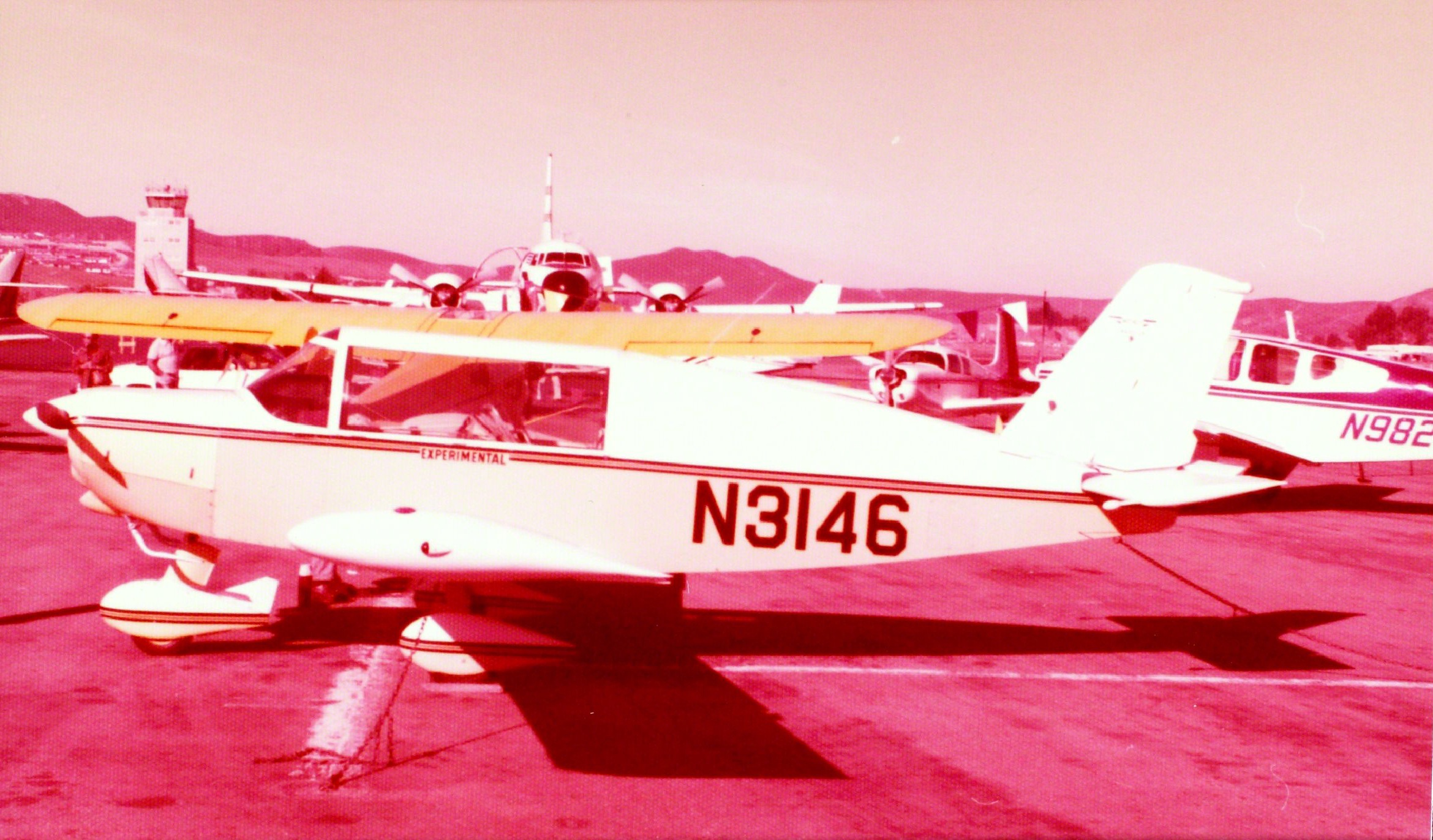

General information
- Type: Two-seat homebuilt sporting aircraft
- National origin: United States
- Manufacturer: Wendt Aircraft Engineering
- Designer: Harold Wend
- Number built: 1

History
- First flight: 15 March 1972

The Wendt WH-1 Traveler is an American two-seat homebuilt sporting aircraft designed by Harold Wendt and built by his company Wendt Aircraft Engineering. Plans for the Traveler were available for amateur construction.

== Design ==
The WH-1 Traveler is a cantilever low-wing monoplane with a conventional wooden fuselage, the wing is a constant-cord two-spar structure with ailerons but no flaps. The prototype aircraft is powered by a 75 hp (56 kW) Continental A-75 air-cooled engine driving a metal two-bladed fixed pitch tractor propeller. The Traveler has a fixed tricycle landing gear with a steerable nose-wheel and glassfibre wheel fairings. The pilot and passenger sit in tandem in an enclosed cockpit with a port-hinged canopy with transparent panels at each side, it also had stowage behind the rear-seat for 50 lb (23 kg) of baggage.

== Specifications ==
Data from Jane's All the World's Aircraft 1973-74

General characteristics

- Crew: 2
- Length: 19 ft 6 in (5.94 m)
- Wingspan: 30 ft 0 in (9.14 m)
- Height: 6 ft 10 in (2.08 m)
- Wing area: 118 sq ft (10.96 m^{2})
- Empty weight: 900 lb (408 kg)
- Gross weight: 1,400 lb (635 kg)
- Powerplant: 1 × Continental A-75 four-cylinder, horizontally opposed and air-cooled piston , 75 hp (56 kW)

Performance

- Maximum speed: 131 mph (211 km/h, 114 kn)
- Cruise speed: 123 mph (198 km/h, 107 kn)
- Stall speed: 65 mph (105 km/h, 56 kn)
- Range: 368 mi (592 km, 320 nmi)
- Service ceiling: 13,000 ft (3,960 m)
- Rate of climb: 750 ft/min (3.8 m/s)
