= Welch OW-4 =

General information
- Type: Three-seat cabin monoplane
- National origin: United States
- Manufacturer: Orin Welch Aircraft Company
- Designer: Orin Moore Welch
- Number built: 1

History
- First flight: 1929

The Welch OW-4 was a three seat, high-wing monoplane, designed by Orin Welch in the late 1920s.

== Specifications ==
- Powerplant: 90 horsepower Curtiss OX-5 engine
- Seating capacity: 3 people (pilot, 2 passengers)
