= Wren Goldcrest =

British ultralight aircraft

Goldcrest

General information
- Type: Single-seat ultralight monoplane
- National origin: United Kingdom
- Manufacturer: Wren Aircraft Company
- Designer: R.G. Carr
- Status: Scrapped
- Number built: 1

History
- Retired: 1947

The Wren Goldcrest was a British single-seat ultra-light low-wing monoplane designed by R.G. Carr and built by the Wren Aircraft Company at Kirklington near Carlisle in 1946.

== Development ==
The Goldcrest was powered by a single 25 hp (19 kW) Scott Squirrel inverted air-cooled two-cylinder in-line piston aero-engine. One aircraft only which was registered G-AICX in August 1946. The production aircraft was planned to use a 30 hp (22 kW) horizontal-opposed four-cylinder two-stroke engine designed by Wren. The aircraft was scrapped in 1947 when plans to put the type into production were cancelled due to a problem obtaining approved materials.

== Specifications ==
Data from

General characteristics

- Crew: 1
- Length: 16 ft 8 in (5.08 m)
- Wingspan: 23 ft 0 in (7.01 m)
- Empty weight: 370 lb (168 kg)
- Gross weight: 580 lb (263 kg)
- Powerplant: 1 × Scott Squirrel , 25 hp (19 kW)

Performance

- Maximum speed: 98 mph (158 km/h, 85 kn)
- Cruise speed: 75 mph (121 km/h, 65 kn)
