= Wendt W-2 Swift =

W-2 Swift

General information
- Type: Two-seat cabin monoplane
- National origin: United States
- Manufacturer: Wendt Aircraft Corporation
- Number built: 1

History
- First flight: 1939

The Wendt W-2 Swift was a two-seat, single-engine, braced high-wing monoplane built in the United States just before World War II. Only one was built.

== Design and development ==
The Wendt Aircraft Co. was formed in February 1939 to build the W-2 Swift, the prototype of which turned out to be their only product. It had a high braced wing, built around two spruce spars. The ribs were made of spruce and birch with steel wire internal bracing. Its leading and trailing edges were metal, with fabric elsewhere. The wing was braced on either side by pairs of V-form, steel struts mounted on the lower fuselage longerons. The fuselage was a chrome molybdenum steel tube structure, fabric covered over plywood formers and spruce stringers. The enclosed cabin, which seated two side-by-side with dual control, was under the wing, with the 90 hp (67 kW) single row radial LeBlond engine mounted immediately ahead of it under a clean NACA cowling in the short nose.

The tail unit was metal framed and fabric covered. The tailplane was externally braced and the elevators carried trim tabs. The fin was straight edged but the rudder, which extended to the bottom of the fuselage and worked in a cut-out between the elevators, had a full, curved trailing edge.

The Swift had a fixed, conventional undercarriage with faired main legs and wheels, rubber shock absorbers and half-axles hinged under the fuselage. The main wheels had brakes and the tailwheel was steerable.

== Specifications ==
Data from Jane's All the World's Aircraft 1941

General characteristics

- Capacity: Two
- Length: 20 ft 0 in (6.10 m)
- Wingspan: 30 ft 0 in (9.14 m)
- Height: 6 ft 8.5 in (2.045 m)
- Wing area: 145 sq ft (13.5 m^{2})
- Empty weight: 778 lb (353 kg)
- Gross weight: 1,400 lb (635 kg)
- Powerplant: 1 × LeBlond (Ken Boyce) 5F 5-cylinder (Note: The LeBlond 5s were 5-cylinder engines, though Jane's 1941 says only that the Swift had a 90 hp, 7-cylinder radial. There were 90 hp LeBlond engines with both 5 and 7 cylinders.) radial, 90 hp (67 kW)
- Propellers: 2-bladed

Performance

- Maximum speed: 130 mph (210 km/h, 110 kn)
- Cruise speed: 120 mph (190 km/h, 100 kn)
- Range: 525 mi (845 km, 456 nmi) at cruising speed
- Service ceiling: 16,000 ft (4,900 m) service ceiling
- Wing loading: 10.0 lb/sq ft (49 kg/m^{2})
- Power/mass: 0.067 hp/lb (0.11 kW/kg)
- Landing speed: 35 mph (56 km/h)
