= Weir W-1 =

Prototype sport autogyro built in the UK in 1933

W-1

General information
- Type: Sport autogyro
- National origin: UK
- Manufacturer: G. & J. Weir
- Number built: 1

History
- First flight: May 1933

The Weir W-1 was a prototype single-seat autogyro built in the UK in 1933. It is also known as the Cierva C.28, because the autogyro concept was licensed from Cierva, who assigned it a designation.

== Design ==
The W-1 had a stubby, cigar-shaped fuselage; a monocoque plywood structure with an oval cross-section. It had a cruciform tail with the fin and rudder extending above and below the fuselage, and with large end-plates creating a triple tail. The two-blade rotor was carried on a cantilever pylon, and was provided with a shaft that took power from the engine for pre-rotation. The W-1 was an early "direct control" autogyro, where the flight controls altered the attitude of the rotor disc, so the aircraft had no ailerons for directional control. A piston engine in the nose drove a tractor propeller. It had tailskid undercarriage, and an open cockpit for the pilot.

== Development ==
The firm of G. & J. Weir (today, the Weir Group) is a Glasgow-based shipbuilder. On 6 July 1932, family and board member James Weir proposed funding a new autogyro design, to be commissioned from Cierva. At this time, the advantages of direct control had become apparent, and although practical applications of this approach had not yet been realised, anticipation of this technological change was dampening sales of autogyros that relied on traditional control surfaces. James Weir proposed funding a direct-control autogyro that would be suitable for personal transportation. The board authorised £GBP 8,000 for the project (about £GBP 480,000 in 2025).

The aircraft was designed by Juan de la Cierva, together with F.L. Hodgess and R.F. Bowyer from Weir. The engine was specially designed and built for the project by Douglas Motors.

The W-1 was built by Weir at Cathcart between late 1932 and the spring of 1933, and then transported to Hanworth for testing.

== Operational history ==
Test flights began in May 1933, the first being with Cierva himself at the controls. However, most of the test flying was probably done by Alan Marsh. By October, Cierva was reportedly working on a mechanism to vary the pitch of the rotor blades to enable vertical take-off.

The W-1 returned to Scotland in autumn, before coming back to Hanworth in December. On 21 December, Marsh overturned it in a landing accident.

During testing, the pre-rotation mechanism and the aircraft's lateral control were found to be inadequate. The W-1 suffered from excessive vibration, although a contemporary account notes that the engine itself was "remarkably free" of vibration.

The W-1 was intended as a prototype for mass-production, but only a single example was built.

== Specifications ==
Data from Brooks 1988, p.178

General characteristics

- Crew: 1 pilot
- Length: 15 ft 0 in (4.57 m)
- Max takeoff weight: 600 lb (272 kg)
- Powerplant: 1 × Douglas Dryad air-cooled, two-cylinder, horizontally-opposed piston engine, 40 hp (30 kW)
- Main rotor diameter: 28 ft 0 in (8.53 m)

Performance

- Maximum speed: 100 mph (160 km/h, 87 kn)
- Cruise speed: 75 mph (121 km/h, 65 kn)

== Notes ==
=== Bibliography ===
- "Autogiro Notes". Flight. Vol. 25, no. 35. London: Flight. 31 August 1933. p. 867.
- "Autogiro Progress". Flight. Vol. 25, no. 41. London: Flight. 12 October 1933. p. 1033.
- "Briefly". Flight. Vol. 25, no. 31. London: Flight. 3 August 1933. p. 790.
- Brooks, Peter W. (1988). Cierva Autogiros: The Development of Rotary-Wing Flight. Washington D.C.: Smithsonian Institution.
- The Illustrated Encyclopedia of Aircraft. London: Aerospace Publishing.
