= Wasp Flight Systems =

British aircraft manufacturer

- Company type: Privately held company
- Industry: Aerospace
- Founded: 1998
- Headquarters: Kendal, Cumbria, England
- Key people: Chris Taylor
- Products: Paramotors
- Website: waspsystems.co.uk

Wasp Flight Systems (often called just Wasp Systems) is a British aircraft manufacturer based in Kendal, Cumbria and run by Chris Taylor. The company specializes in the design and manufacture of powered hang gliders in the form of ready-to-fly motorized harnesses for the US FAR 103 Ultralight Vehicles rules and the European microlight category.

The company was founded in 1998.

The company's sole product is the Wasp SP, a powered hang glider unit. This has gone through several generations of development, including the Wasp SP Mk2, introduced in 2002 and the current production version, the Wasp SP Mk4.

== Aircraft ==
Summary of aircraft built by Wasp Flight Systems
Model name	First flight	Number built	Type
Wasp SP Mk2	2002		powered hang glider
Wasp SP Mk4			powered hang glider
