= Windtech Parapentes =

Spanish aircraft manufacturer

- Company type: Privately held company
- Industry: Aerospace
- Founded: 1994
- Headquarters: Gijón, Spain
- Products: Paragliders
- Website: windtech.es/en/

Windtech Parapentes (English: Windtech Paragliders) is a Spanish aircraft manufacturer based in Gijón and founded in 1994. The company specializes in the design and manufacture of paragliders in the form of ready-to-fly aircraft, as well as rescue parachutes.

By the mid-2000s the company had established a complete line of paragliders, including the two-place tandem Bantoo and the beginner Coral for flight training, the beginner to intermediate Tonic, the sports intermediate Pulsar, the advanced intermediate Quarx, the advanced cross country Syncro and the competition Nitro glider.

== Aircraft ==
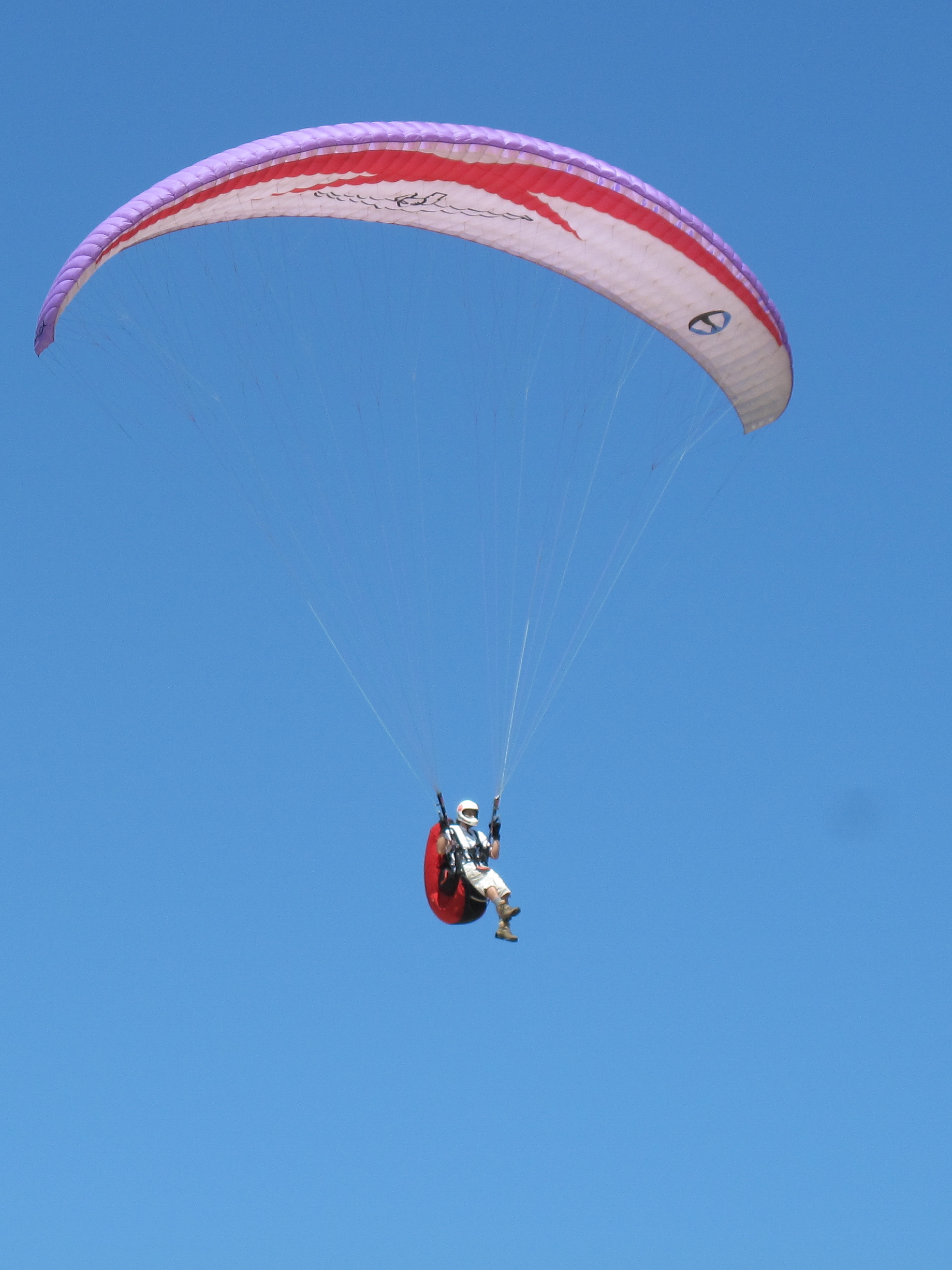
Windtech Quarx1

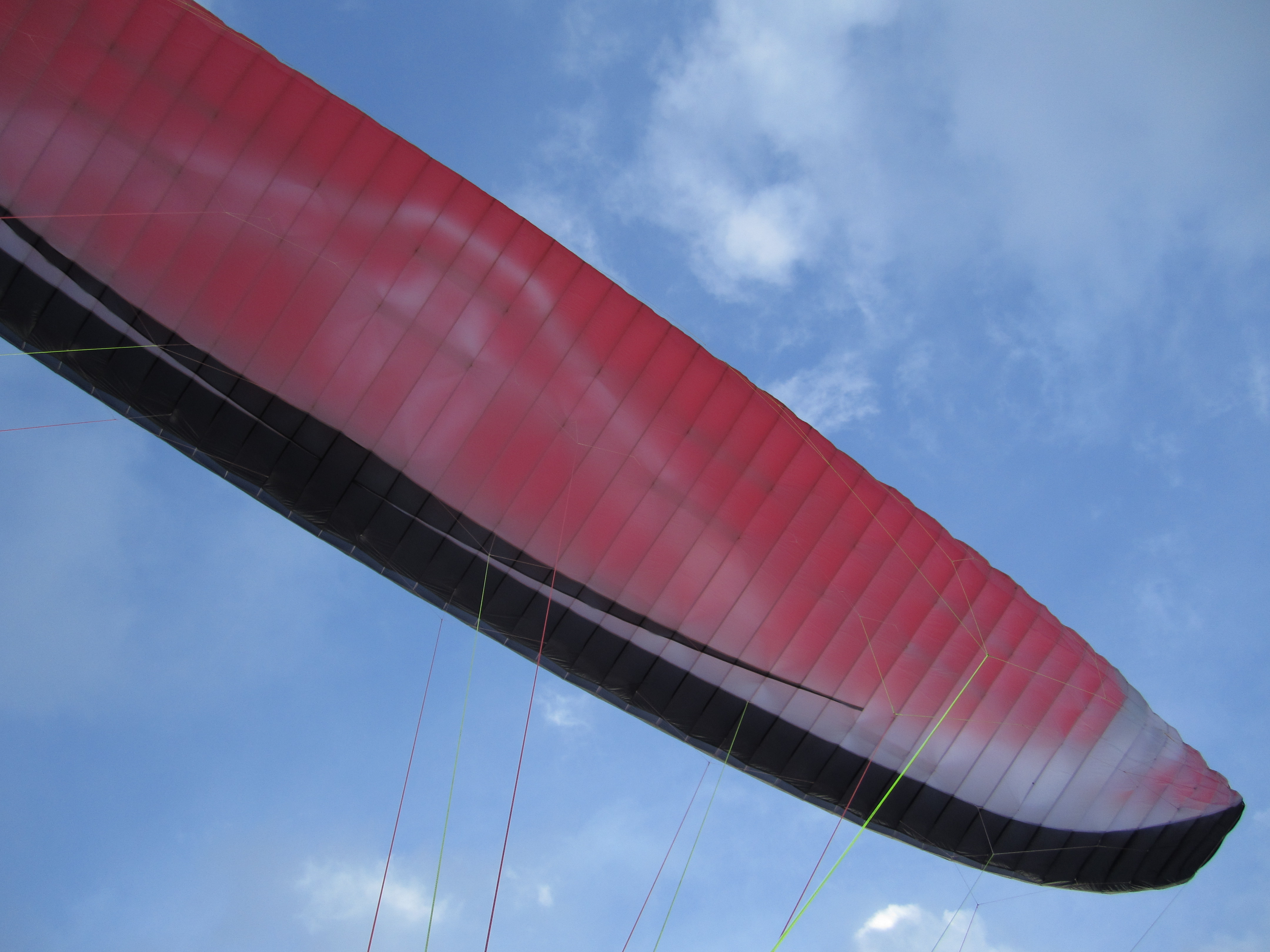
Windtech Zenith

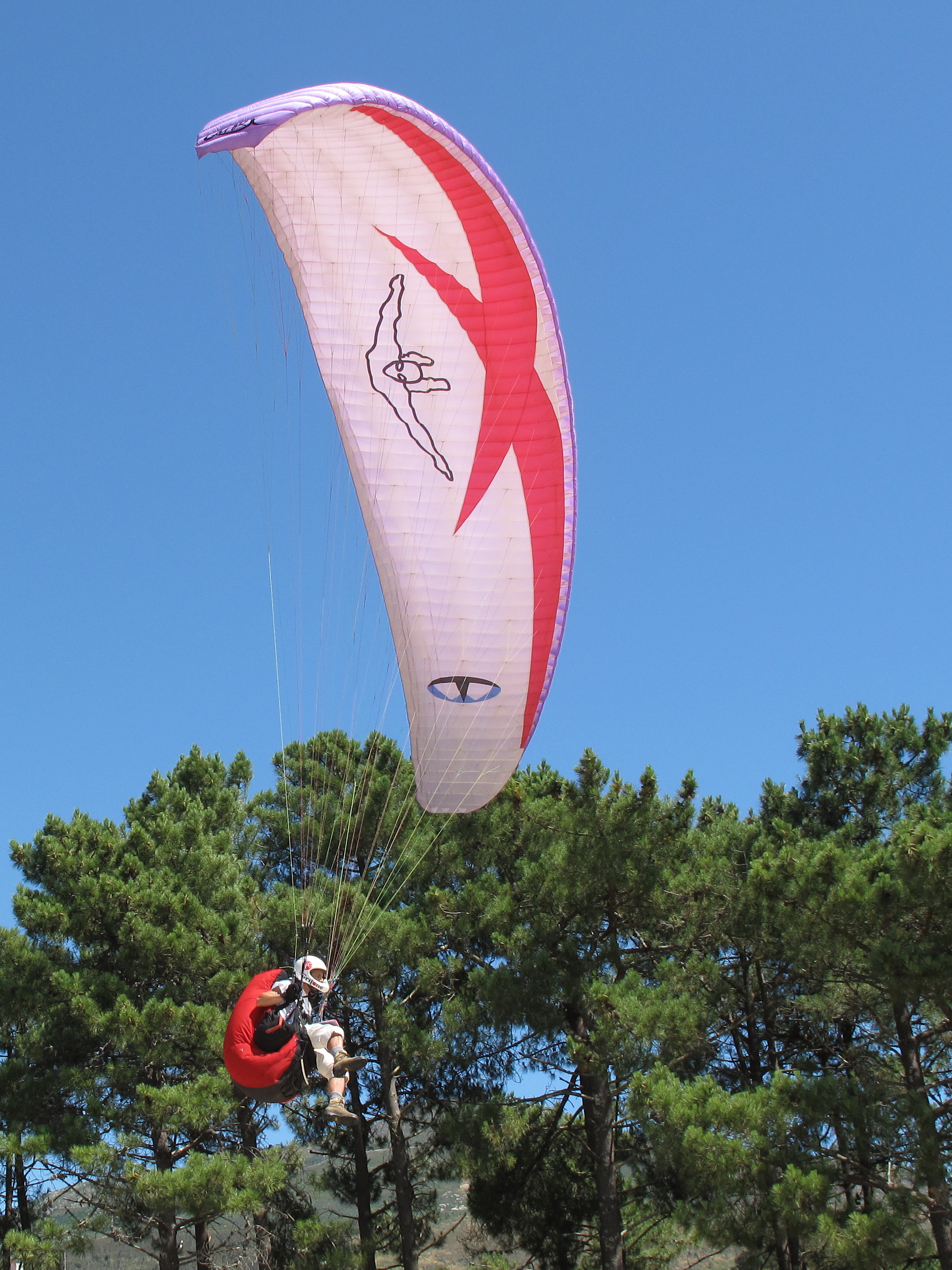
Windtech Quarx1

Summary of aircraft built by Windtech Parapentes:

- Windtech Altair
- Windtech Ambar
- Windtech Arial
- Windtech Bali
- Windtech Bantoo
- Windtech Cargo
- Windtech Combat
- Windtech Coral
- Windtech Evo
- Windtech Fenix
- Windtech Honey
- Windtech Impulse
- Windtech Kali
- Windtech Kinetik
- Windtech Loop
- Windtech Nitro
- Windtech Pulsar
- Windtech Quarx
- Windtech Ru-bi
- Windtech Serak
- Windtech Silex
- Windtech Spiro
- Windtech Syncro
- Windtech Tactic
- Windtech Tecno
- Windtech Tempest
- Windtech Tempus
- Windtech Tonic
- Windtech Tuareg
- Windtech Tucan
- Windtech Windy
- Windtech Zenith
- Windtech Zephyr
