= Wallace Touroplane =

Touroplane
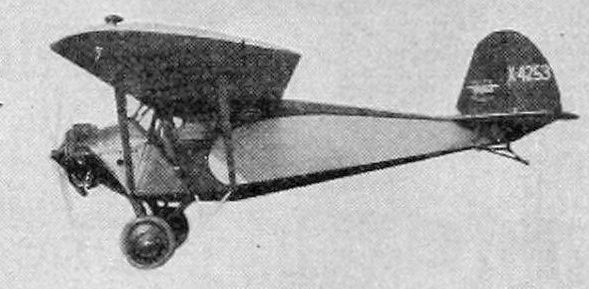
- The Anzani-powered Touroplane B first prototype

General information
- Type: Three seat civil training and touring aircraft
- National origin: U.S.
- Manufacturer: Wallace Aircraft Co.
- Designer: Stanley Wallace
- Number built: About 20

History
- First flight: 1928

The Wallace Touroplane was a late 1920s U.S. three seat, high wing cabin monoplane. About 20 were built.

== Design and development ==
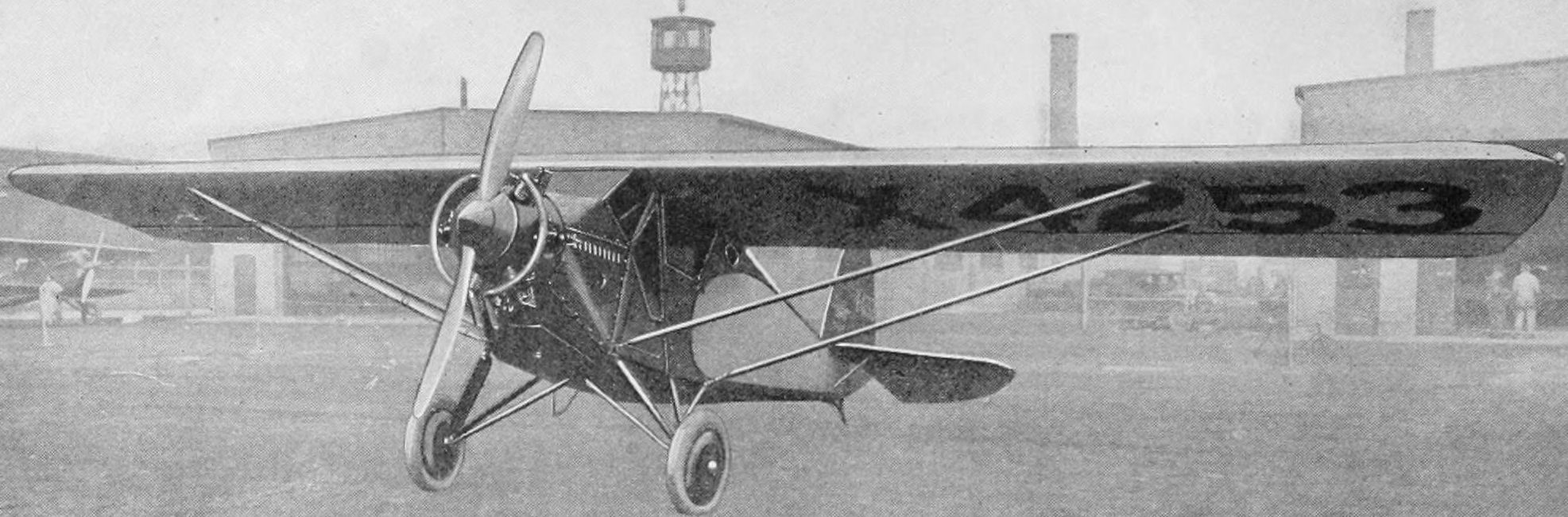
The Anzani-powered Touroplane B first prototype

In 1928 Stanley Wallace set up a company to produce a three-seat, high wing monoplane which he had designed and named the Touroplane. It was powered by an 80 hp (60 kW) Anzani radial engine and as many as six of these may have been built. In 1929 Wallace Aircraft Co. marketed a development designated Touroplane B which had a 100 hp (75 kW) Kinner K-5 radial. During 1929 Wallace Aircraft became a division of American Eagle, who called the type B the 330 Touroplane.

The wing of the Touroplane was of blunted rectangular plan, built on twin spruce spars and fabric-covered. Its ailerons, which reached over half the span from the wingtips, had tube metal structures. The wings were mounted on the upper fuselage structure over the cabin and braced to the lower fuselage longerons by pairs of struts which converged slightly from the lower fuselage longerons to the spars. The wings could be folded, a task that took only a few minutes and reduced the width to 12 ft 4 in (3.76 m).

The Touroplane's Kinner engine was mounted with cylinders exposed for cooling. The fuselage was a welded, flat-sided, steel tube structure and was fabric-covered. The cabin placed pilot and co-pilot (or student or passenger) side by side under the leading edge of the wing, with a windscreen reaching forwards of it and with side windows. Dual controls were fitted. A third seat was placed centrally behind them, with its own windows. Access was via windowed doors under mid-chord, between the wing struts.

The tube steel tail was conventional with a flight-adjustable tailplane mounted on top of the fuselage carrying rounded elevators. Its fin was straight-edged, with a rounded tip and was braced to the tailplane. The unbalanced rudder was full and rounded.

The Touroplane had a fixed, conventional undercarriage with a track of 6 ft 6 in (1.98 m). Its mainwheels, fitted with brakes, were on split axles from the central fuselage underside. Oleo strut legs and drag struts were mounted on the lower longerons. It had a long, sprung, tailskid.

The original Touroplane first flew in 1928 though the date is not known. The prototype type B gained its ATC in 1929, then still Anzani-powered. Later, it was fitted with a 165 hp (123 kW) Wright J-5 radial. After the prototype 13 were produced. Some were flown with other engines: two had Curtiss OX-5s and one a seven-cylinder 150 hp (110 kW) MacClatchie Panther radial. The latter was designated type C-31.

== Variants ==
Wallace Touroplane
1928 version with an 80 hp (60 kW) Anzani radial engine.
Wallace Touroplane B
1929 development with a 100 hp (75 kW) Kinner radial engine.
Wallace Touroplane C-31
as Touroplane B but with a 150 hp (110 kW) MacClatchie radial.
American Eagle 330 Touroplane
as Touroplane B.

== Specifications (Touroplane B) ==
Data from Aero Digest, November 1929

General characteristics

- Crew: one
- Capacity: two passengers
- Length: 24 ft (7.3 m)
- Wingspan: 37 ft (11 m)
- Height: 8 ft (2.4 m)
- Wing area: 212 sq ft (19.7 m^{2})
- Empty weight: 1,320 lb (599 kg)
- Gross weight: 2,100 lb (953 kg)
- Payload: 425 lb (193 kg)
- Fuel capacity: 32 US gal (27 imp gal; 120 L)
- Powerplant: 1 × Kinner K-5 5-cylinder radial, 100 hp (75 kW) at 1,850 rpm.
- Propellers: 2-bladed

Performance

- Maximum speed: 115 mph (185 km/h, 100 kn)
- Cruise speed: 100 mph (160 km/h, 87 kn)
- Landing speed: 43 mph (69 km/h; 37 kn)
- Range: 500 mi (800 km, 430 nmi)
- Service ceiling: 14,000 ft (4,300 m)
- Rate of climb: 800 ft/min (4.1 m/s)
