= WKF 80.04 =

WWI Austria-Hungary military reconnaissance aircraft

General information
- Type: Reconnaissance aircraft
- National origin: Austria-Hungary
- Manufacturer: Wiener Karosserie und Flugzeugfabrik (WKF)
- Designer: Alfred Gassner
- Number built: 1

History
- First flight: September 1917

The WKF 80.04 was a prototype Austro-Hungarian reconnaissance aircraft built in the final months of World War I.

== Development ==
80.04 was a biplane whose fuselage featured a hexagonal cross-section. Only one prototype was built.

== Specifications ==
Data from Austro-Hungarian Army Aircraft of World War One

General characteristics

- Crew: 1
- Length: 7.3 m (23 ft 11 in)
- Upper wingspan: 8.96 m (29 ft 5 in)
- Lower wingspan: 7.82 m (25 ft 8 in)
- Height: 2.7 m (8 ft 10 in)
- Empty weight: 630 kg (1,389 lb)
- Gross weight: 1,030 kg (2,271 lb)
- Powerplant: 1 × Austro-Daimler 6 water-cooled 6-cylinder in-line piston engine, 150 kW (200 hp)
- Propellers: 2 or 4-bladed fixed-pitch ptropeller

Performance
