= Whigham GW-5 =

American glider

GW-5

General information
- Type: Glider
- National origin: United States
- Designer: Gene Whigham
- Number built: one

History
- Introduction date: 1980

The Whigham GW-5 is an American mid-wing, single seat, FAI Standard Class glider that was designed and constructed by Gene Whigham, a retired flight test engineer for Convair.

== Design and development ==
The GW-5 was designed for the standard class and as such it features a constant-chord 15 m (49.2 ft) wing with a Wortmann FX 61-184 airfoil and flaps for glidepath control.

The GW-5 is of all-metal construction. The landing gear is a faired fixed monowheel. The aircraft has a bubble canopy and a conventional low tail.

One GW-5 was built. It was completed in 1980 and registered with the Federal Aviation Administration in the Experimental - Amateur-built category.

== Operational history ==
The sole GW-5 built was sold in September 2012 and the registration has expired. It is not known if the aircraft still exists or not.

== Specifications (GW-5) ==
Data from Sailplane Directory and Soaring

General characteristics

- Crew: one
- Wingspan: 49 ft 3 in (15.0 m)
- Wing area: 131 sq ft (12.2 m^{2})
- Aspect ratio: 18.5:1
- Airfoil: Wortmann FX 61-184
- Empty weight: 518 lb (235 kg)
- Gross weight: 770 lb (349 kg)

Performance

- Maximum glide ratio: 33:1
- Wing loading: 5.87 lb/sq ft (28.7 kg/m^{2})

== See also ==
Related lists

- List of gliders
