= Whigham GW-2 =

American glider

GW-2

General information
- Type: Glider
- National origin: United States
- Designer: Gene Whigham
- Status: No longer in production
- Number built: Two

History
- First flight: 1964
- Developed from: Whigham GW-1

The Whigham GW-2 is an American high-wing, single-seat, V-tailed, FAI Open Class glider that was designed and constructed by Gene Whigham, a retired flight test engineer for Convair.

== Design and development ==
The GW-2 was intended as a model that improved upon the performance of the GW-1. To that end it uses a 53 ft (16.2 m) span wing with a much higher aspect ratio of 26:1 and a Wortmann FX 61-184 airfoil. The GW-2 also uses a V-tail.

The GW-2 is an all-metal design, with doped aircraft fabric covering on the aft part of the wing, behind the spar. The wing mounts spoilers for glide-path control. The landing gear is a fixed monowheel, with a secondary skid.

The prototype GW-2 was registered as N94291 and first flown in 1964. A second GW-2 was also completed.

== Operational history ==
The prototype GW-1 was flown in three US National competitions.

In July 2011 one GW-2 remained on the Federal Aviation Administration registry.

== Specifications (GW-2) ==
Data from Sailplane Directory and Soaring

General characteristics

- Crew: one
- Wingspan: 53 ft 0 in (16.15 m)
- Wing area: 108 sq ft (10.0 m^{2})
- Aspect ratio: 26:1
- Airfoil: Wortmann FX 61-184
- Empty weight: 385 lb (175 kg)
- Gross weight: 620 lb (281 kg)

Performance

- Maximum glide ratio: estimated 37:1 at 55 mph (89 km/h)
- Wing loading: 5.7 lb/sq ft (28 kg/m^{2})

== See also ==
Related lists

- List of gliders
