= Wier RDW-2 Draggin' Fly =

RDW-2 Draggin' Fly
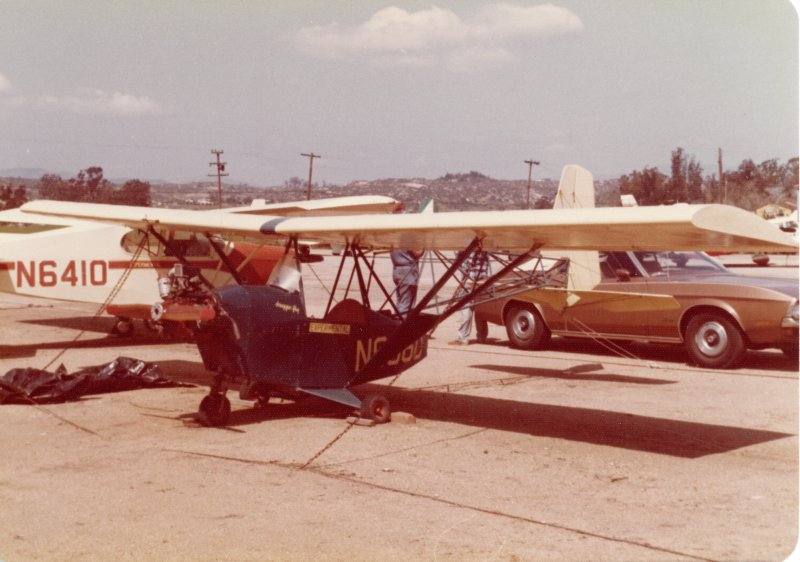
- Wier Draggin' Fly N8360

General information
- Type: Single seat lightweight homebuilt
- National origin: United States
- Designer: Ronald Wier
- Number built: 1

History
- First flight: May 1972

The Wier RDW-2 Draggin' Fly was a homebuilt light aircraft, designed in the United States in the 1970s, aimed at fairly inexperienced builders and flyers. Plans were available but only one was built.

== Design and development ==
The Draggin' Fly was designed to be easy to build, to have good short field characteristics and to have control characteristics matched to the skills of less experienced pilots. A four-cylinder Volkswagen air-cooled engine was selected for reliability and ease of maintenance. The sole example was constructed over ten months without plans, though a rib jig and propeller plot were used. It was first flown in May 1972.

The Draggin' Fly had a constant chord parasol wing, built around two spruce spars and having slight dihedral. The wing was Dacron covered and carried no flaps; the ailerons were aluminium with a full span torque tube. It was held well above the fuselage on a pair of V-shaped bracing struts, assisted by inverted V-cabane struts fore and aft of the cockpit. The fuselage was a steel tube structure and Dacron covered over the forward, pod like part that housed the engine and cockpit but open and triangular in section as it extended rearwards into a tailboom at cabane height. The tail surfaces were again Dacron covered steel, wire braced with the tailplane placed at the bottom of the boom and with the lower rudder and a small ventral fin projecting below it. The Draggin' Fly had a fixed tricycle undercarriage, the mainwheels mounted on two V-form struts and half-axles hinged to the fuselage underside. All undercarriage legs used spring and rubber in compression type shock absorbers; the nose wheel was steerable.

For its first flight and first eight hours of flight testing the Draggin' Fly was powered by a 36 hp (29 kW), 1.2 L Volkswagen engine but this was then replaced by a more powerful Volkswagen variant producing 50 hp (37 kW). Plans for amateur building were produced in March 1974.

== Specifications ==
Data from Jane's All the World's Aircraft 1974–75

General characteristics

- Crew: One
- Length: 17 ft 5 in (5.31 m)
- Wingspan: 24 ft 5 in (7.44 m)
- Height: 6 ft 10 in (2.08 m)
- Wing area: 110 sq ft (10 m^{2})
- Airfoil: USA 35B
- Empty weight: 470 lb (213 kg)
- Max takeoff weight: 688 lb (312 kg)
- Fuel capacity: 8.0 US gal (6.7 Imp gal; 30 L)
- Powerplant: 1 × 1.6 L (98 cu in) modified Volkswagen air-cooled flat four, 50 hp (37 kW)
- Propellers: 2-bladed hand carved mahogany, 4 ft 4 in (1.32 m) diameter

Performance

- Maximum speed: 70 mph (110 km/h, 61 kn) at sea level
- Cruise speed: 65 mph (105 km/h, 56 kn) at sea level
- Stall speed: 32 mph (51 km/h, 28 kn)
- Never exceed speed: 100 mph (160 km/h, 87 kn)
- Range: 170 mi (270 km, 150 nmi) no reserves
- Service ceiling: 4,000 ft (1,200 m)
- Rate of climb: 200 ft/min (1.0 m/s) at sea level
- Wing loading: 6.25 lb/sq ft (30.5 kg/m^{2}) maximum
- Take-off run: 150 ft (46 m)
- Landing run: 200 ft (61 m)
