= Wings of Change =

Austrian aircraft manufacturer

- Company type: Privately held company
- Industry: Aerospace
- Headquarters: Fulpmes, Austria
- Products: Paragliders
- Owner: Markus Gründhammer
- Website: www.wings-of-change.at

Wings of Change is an Austrian aircraft manufacturer based in Fulpmes, founded by Markus Gründhammer. The company specializes in the design and manufacture of paragliders in the form of ready-to-fly aircraft.

By 2003 the company had a range of gliders in their line including the Chinhook Bi two-place tandem, the intermediate Taifun and Twister, plus the performance Tsunami.

Reviewer Noel Bertrand said of the company in a 2003 profile, "Markus Gründhammer still manages to make the safest paragliders without losing anything in performance."

The company's 2011 and later line includes gliders with such names as the Deathblade, Predator and Psychohammer.

Designer Gründhammer said of his Deathblade paraglider, a glider with an aspect ratio of 13.01:1, wing with 113 cells and a top speed of 68 km/h (37 kn), "finally, a wing that meets my expectations of performance and flying qualities and equally challenges my skills. Some guys need a Ferrari. As for me, I build my own paragliders in order to advance as a test pilot and also on a personal scale. To me, the motivation of finding ever new dimensions and testing out the limits of feasibility means developing mental strength and feeling 'pure life'."

The company also builds the Skyman line of lightweight mountain gliders for activities such as bivouac flying.

== Aircraft ==
Summary of aircraft built by Wings of Change:

- Wings of Change Acrominator
- Wings of Change Braveheart
- Wings of Change Chinhook Bi
- Wings of Change Crossblade
- Wings of Change Deathblade
- Wings of Change Druid
- Wings of Change Edonis
- Wings of Change Reinhold
- Wings of Change Ötzi
- Wings of Change Predator
- Wings of Change Psychohammer
- Wings of Change Speedy Gonzales
- Wings of Change Taifun
- Wings of Change Tsunami
- Wings of Change Tuareg
- Wings of Change Twister
- Wings of Change X-Fighter
- Wings of Change XPlor-air
- Skyman Amicus
- Skyman The Rock
- Skyman CrossCountry
- Skyman Heartbeat
- Skyman CrossAlps
- Skyman PassengAir
- Skyman Tandem
- Skyman Reinhold II
- Skyman Furio
