= Wilson Global Explorer =

American-built amphibious aircraft

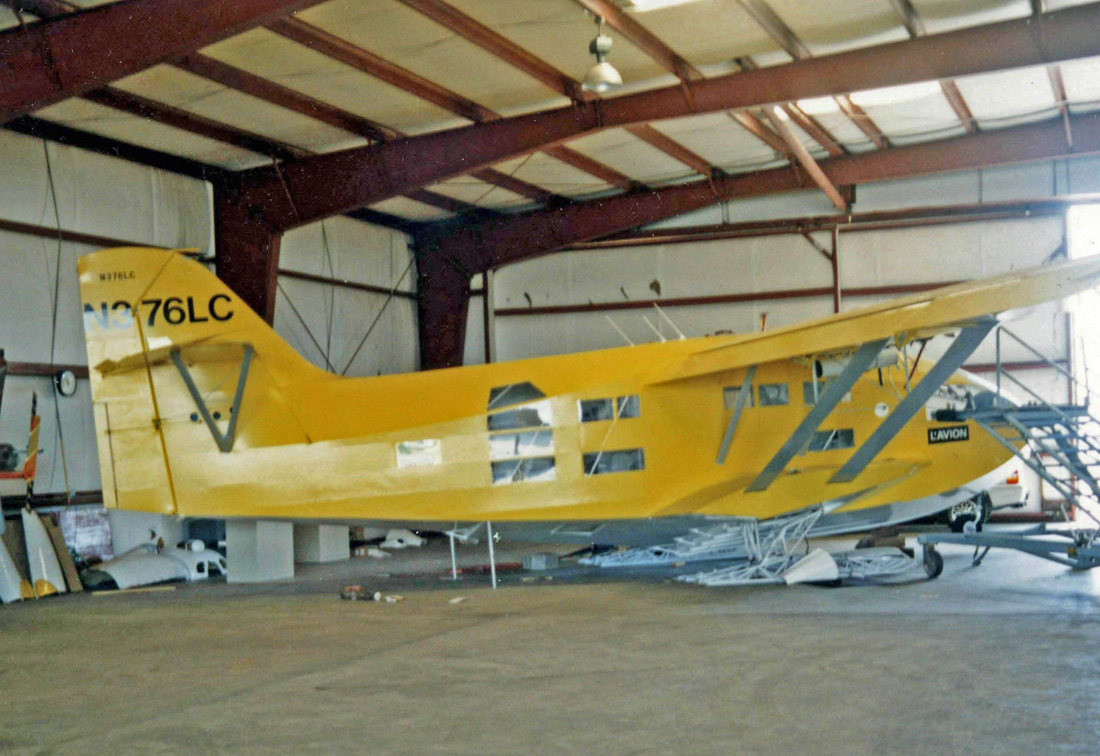
- The second Global Explorer undergoing maintenance at Santa Fe Airport, New Mexico, in 1995.

General information
- Type: amphibian
- National origin: United States
- Manufacturer: Dean W. Wilson
- Designer: Dean W. Wilson
- Status: Retired
- Primary user: international explorers
- Number built: 2

History
- Introduction date: 1994
- First flight: April 1991

The Wilson Global Explorer is an American-built amphibious aircraft of the early 1990s which has been utilised to assist the exploration of remote areas.

== Development ==
The high-wing twin-engine Global Explorer was designed and constructed in Idaho by Dean W. Wilson to the order of the explorer Hubert de Chevigny and the aircraft first flew in April 1991. A second aircraft was constructed later.

The Global Explorer has an unusually deep and wide fuselage design with many glazed areas, and accommodation at the rear for sleeping and other purposes. For added strength, the high-set wings are each supported by brace structures from the side fuselage and from the lower sponsons. The nose gear retracts forward of the hull and acts as a bumper for water operations. The mainwheels can be removed and the fixed side sponsons assist flotation and manoeuvering on water. Various Lycoming engines of between 200 hp and 300 hp have been fitted, depending on the expected altitude to be reached during planned operations.

== Operational history ==
The Explorer 1 (N376DT), painted in white, was used by Hubert de Chevigny and Nicolas Hulot. After a take off with the lift spoilers "on", the plane hit the trees and crashed near Port McNeill, British Columbia.

The Explorer 2 (N376LC), painted in yellow, has been used by Canal + for the French show Dans la nature with Stéphane Peyron, with the name "L'Avion", in the exploration and filming of a wide variety of locations including Australia's Great Barrier Reef, Argentina's Tierra del Fuego and Bolivia. It can be readily stripped down and shipped by sea to required locations and can carry and accommodate seven persons overnight. The aircraft flew finally from Australia to France in 1998 and it was then withdrawn from use and the project was abandoned due to the unique aircraft's high cost of maintenance. It crashed at Blois / Le Breuil aerodrome in 2001. It's now stored in the "Musée de l'Hydraviation" at Biscarrosse.

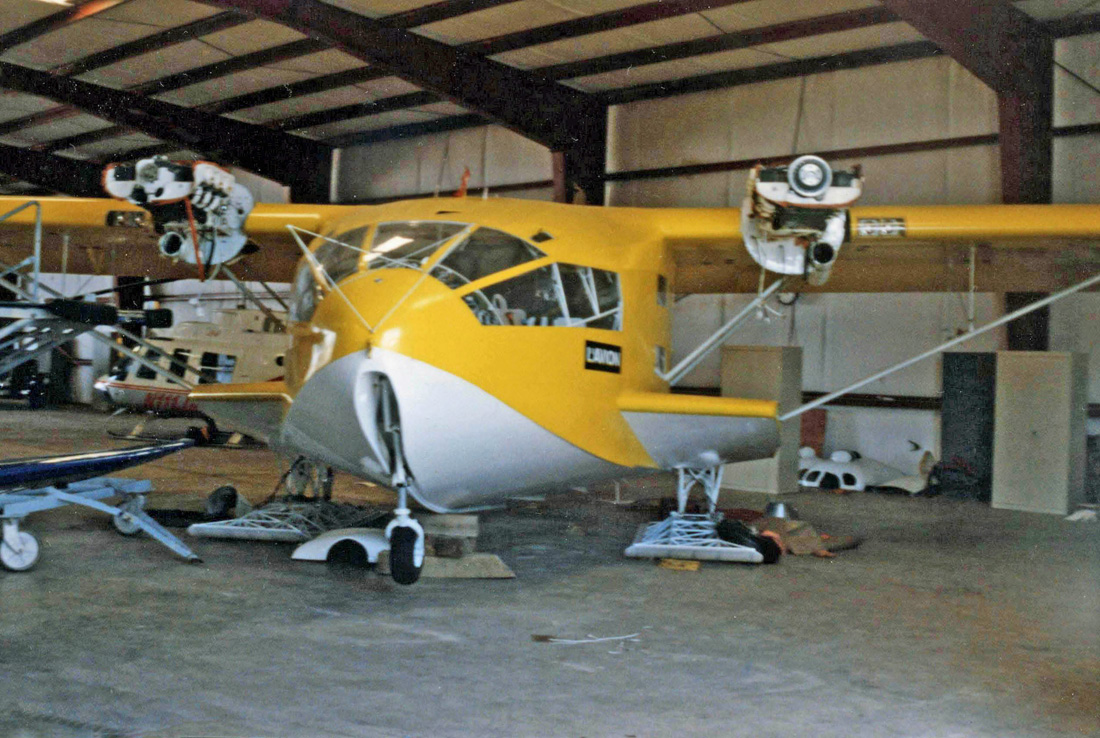
Front view of the Global Explorer showing the deep and wide fuselage, and slot for forward retraction of the nosewheel

== Specifications (variant) ==
Data from coastcomp.com

General characteristics

- Crew: 1
- Capacity: 6 passengers and crew
- Length: 39 ft 10 in (12.14 m)
- Wingspan: 67 ft 0 in (20.42 m)
- Height: 22 ft 0 in (6.71 m)
- Empty weight: 4,995 lb (2,266 kg)
- Gross weight: 8,000 lb (3,629 kg)
- Powerplant: 2 × Lycoming IO-540 , 300 hp (220 kW) each

Performance

- Maximum speed: 120 mph (190 km/h, 100 kn)
- Cruise speed: 110 mph (180 km/h, 96 kn)
- Stall speed: 60 mph (97 km/h, 52 kn)
