= Whigham GW-1 =

American glider

GW-1

General information
- Type: Glider
- National origin: United States
- Designer: Gene Whigham
- Status: No longer in production
- Number built: One

History
- First flight: 1959

The Whigham GW-1 is an American high-wing, single-seat glider that was designed and constructed by Gene Whigham, a retired flight test engineer for Convair.

== Design and development ==
The GW-1 was built in concert with the Tweed GT-1 as both builders shared ideas and tools. The two aircraft share some common design features, although their wings are completely different. The GW-1 first flew in 1959 and at that time had a 40 ft (12 m) wingspan.

The GW-1's wings were extended in 1961 with new tips to 44.5 ft (14 m). The constant-chord wing features a NACA 23018 airfoil and flaps of 25% chord and 22 ft (7 m) span. The aircraft's construction is all-metal, except for the fiberglass nose.

Only one GW-1 was built and it was registered in the Experimental Amateur-built category.

== Operational history ==
The GW-1 was used to complete a diamond badge goal flight in 1961.

In July 2011, some 52 years after its completion, the aircraft was still on the Federal Aviation Administration registry and owned by John Coughlin of Del Rio, Texas.

== Specifications (GW-1) ==
Data from Sailplane Directory and Soaring

General characteristics

- Crew: one
- Wingspan: 44 ft 6 in (13.56 m)
- Wing area: 107 sq ft (9.9 m^{2})
- Aspect ratio: 18.5:1
- Airfoil: NACA 23018
- Empty weight: 340 lb (154 kg)
- Gross weight: 540 lb (245 kg)

Performance

- Maximum glide ratio: 29 at 55 mph (89 km/h)
- Wing loading: 5.0 lb/sq ft (24 kg/m^{2})

== See also ==
Related lists

- List of gliders
