= List of gliders (W) =

This is a list of gliders/sailplanes of the world, (this reference lists all gliders with references, where available) Note: Any aircraft can glide for a short time, but gliders are designed to glide for longer.

== W ==
=== W.W.S. ===
(Wojskowe Warsztaty Szybowcowe – military glider workshops)

- W.W.S.1 Salamandra
- W.W.S.2 Żaba (Frog)
- W.W.S.3 Delfin (Dolphin)

=== Waco ===
- Waco CG-3A
- Waco CG-4A
- Waco CG-13A
- Waco CG-15
- Waco Primary
- Northwestern PG-1 (CG-4)
- Ridgefield PG-2 (CG-4)
- Waco PG-3 (CG-15)
- Waco LRW (CG-4)
- Waco LR2W USN transport glider

=== Wagener ===
(H. Wagener)

- Wagener H.F.V. 17 Pirat

=== Waibel-Butler ===
(Gerhard Waibel & Dick Butler & Loek Boermans & Johannes Dillinger)

- Waibel-Butler Concordia

=== Walker ===
(Sam Walker)

- Walker Aria

=== Wallisa ===
(Józef Walis)

- Wallisa S-I (Willis S.1 or Walis S-1) No.18 – Second Polish Glider Contest 17 May – 15 June 1925
- Wallisa S-III No.19 – Second Polish Glider Contest 17 May – 15 June 1925

=== Walters ===
(Fred Walters)

- Walters Sinbad I

=== Walther ===
(Don Walther of Christchurch, New Zealand )

- Walther Boffin-Coffin

=== Warczewski ===
(J. Warczewski – No.16 – Second Polish Glider Contest 17 May – 15 June 1925)

- Mechanik (glider) (Mechanic)

=== Warner ===
(Martin Warner & Allan J. Campbell)

- Warner Brolga
- Warner Kite 2
- Warner-Campbell Kite 1

=== Warszawa Uczniów Gymnazjum ===
(Chrzanowski-Gymnasiums in Warszawa)

- Warszawa Uczniów Gymnazjum glider

=== Wassmer ===
(Ets. Benjamin Wassmer / Wassmer Aviation SA)

- Wassmer WA 20 Javelot
- Wassmer WA 21 Javelot II
- Wassmer WA 22 Super Javelot
- Wassmer WA 22 Super Javelot 64
- Wassmer WA-22-28
- Wassmer WA-23
- Wassmer WA 26 Squale
- Wassmer WA 26 CM Squale Marfa
- Wassmer WA 28 Espadon
- Wassmer WA 30 Bijave
- Wassmer KBK-10
- Wassmer-SIREN H-230

=== Watson-Northrop ===
(J.P. Watson & Jack Northrop)

- Watson-Northrop 1929 glider

=== Weber ===
(Ernst Weber)

- Weber EW-1 – ANDRÖS, & MÜLLER
- Weber EW-2
- Weber EW-3 Libelle
- Weber EW-18
- Weber 108-16 RLM designation for EW-2

=== Weber ===
(Günther Weber - East Germany [DDR - Deutsches Demokratische Republik])

- Weber We-3 1971
- Weber We-4 1964

=== Weber-Landholf-Münch ===
- Weber-Landholf-Münch WLM-1
- Weber-Landholf-Münch WLM-2

=== Weiss ===
(José Weiss)

- Weiss 1914 glider
- Weiss Joker
- Weiss Olive

=== Weltensegler ===
(Weltensegler G.m.b.H)

- Weltensegler Feldberg aka Strandpromenade ?)
- Weltensegler Baden-Baden Stolz

=== Wenham ===
- Wenham Multiplane 1858

=== Westmacott ===
(R. J. Westmacott & K. Westmacott)

- Westmacott Skylark

=== Wezel ===
(Martin Wezel Flugzeugtechnik)

- Wezel Viva
- Wezel Apis 2

=== Whigham ===
(Eugene Whigham)

- Whigham GW-1
- Whigham GW-2
- Whigham GW-3
- Whigham GW-4
- Whigham GW-5
- Whigham GW-6
- Whigham GW-7

=== Whisper ===
(Whisper Aircraft)

- Whisper Motor Glider

=== Whitehead ===
(Gustave Whitehead, née Weiskopf)

- Whitehead 1897 glider

=== Widmaier ===
(Kuno Widmaier / IPE - Industria Paranaense de Estruturas)

- Widmaier GB-1 Quero
- Widmaier KW-1 Quero Quero
- Widmaier KW-2 Biguá

=== Widmer ===
(Hans Widmer / Matheus Avallone Sobrinho & Kurt Hendrich)

- Widmer HW-4 Flamengo (Flamingo)

=== Wiederkehr ===
- Wiederkehr GHW-1 Cu-Climber
- Wiederkehr GHW-2

=== Wiesner ===
(Jaroslav Wiesner)

- Wiesner Schrudim

=== Wikner ===
(Geoffrey Neville Wikner)

- Wikner Golden Sparrow
- Wikner-Lindner Secondary

=== Wilkes ===
- Wilkes BMW-1

=== Wilkinson ===
- Wilkinson Mk 1
- Wilkinson Mk 2

=== Wimmer-Dewald ===
(Josef Immer & Alexander Dewald)

- Wimmer-Dewald Leonardo 2000

=== Wind ===
(Willy Wind)

- Wind Wi-1

=== Windward Performance ===
(Greg Cole)

- Windward Performance Perlan II
- Windward Performance SparrowHawk
- Windward Performance DuckHawk
- Windward Performance JetHawk
- Windward Performance GosHawk

=== Wishart ===
(Alfred William Wishart)

- Wishart 1930 glider
- Wishart Biplane glider

=== WLM ===
(WLM Flugingenieure / Rudolf Sägesser / Isler & Co, Wildegg / H. Sägesser, Flugzeugbbau, Herzogenbuchsee)

- WLM-1
- WLM-2

=== Wright ===
(Peter W. Wright)

- Wright Micron
- Wright MPA – man powered aircraft
- Wright Falcon

=== Wright Bros. ===
(Wilbur & Orville Wright)

- Wright 1900
- Wright 1901
- Wright 1902
- Wright IV 1911

=== WS ===
(Warsztaty Szybowcowe – glider workshops)

- WS SG-3
- WS SG-7
- WS SG-21 Lwów
- WS SG-28
- WS Wrona
- WS Komar
- WS Sroka
- WS Sokol
- WS Mewa
- WS Orlik

=== WWS ===
(Wiegand und Wisser Sportflugzeugbau GmbH & Co. KG)

- WWS WM-1
