= List of gliders (G) =

This is a list of gliders/sailplanes of the world, (this reference lists all gliders with references, where available) Note: Any aircraft can glide for a short time, but gliders are designed to glide for longer.

== G ==
=== Gabelier ===
(Raymond Gabelier)

- Gabelier RG-40

=== Gad'Arts ===
- Gad'Arts AM-58

=== Galatasaray ===
(Galatasaray High School)

- Galatasaray Kleopatra

=== Gallaudet ===
(Edson Fessenden Gallaudet)

- Gallaudet Hydrokite

=== Gannet ===
- Gannet G-4 Olympos

=== Garalevičiaus-Kulvinskio ===
(J. Garalevičiaus & A. Kulvinskio)

- Garalevičiaus-Kulvinskio GK-1

=== Gardner ===
(L. Gardner)

- Gardner Cumulus

=== Garstecki ===
(Tadeusz Garstecki)

- Garstecki Rywal (Rival) No.17 – Second Polish Glider Contest 17 May – 15 June 1925

=== GATC ===
(General Airborne Transport Company)

- GATC XCG-16
- GATC MC-1A

=== GBMZ ===
(GBMZ / August Hug)

- GBMZ Zögling

=== GCSA ===
(William Stancliffe Shackleton & Harold Bradley / GCSA -Gliding Club of South Australia)

- GCSA Lark

=== Gehrlein ===
- Gehrlein GP-1
- Gehrlein Precursor

=== General Aircraft ===
(General Aircraft Ltd.)

- General Aircraft G.A.L.48 Hotspur
- General Aircraft G.A.L.48B Twin-Hotspur
- General Aircraft G.A.L.49 Hamilcar
- General Aircraft GAL.50 1/2 scale Hamilcar
- General Aircraft G.A.L.55
- General Aircraft G.A.L.56
- General Aircraft G.A.L.57
- General Aircraft G.A.L.58 Hamilcar X powered Hamilcar (2x Bristol Mercury)
- General Aircraft G.A.L.61

=== Gilbert ===
(J. Gilbert)

- Gilbert 1922 glider

=== Gilbert ===
(Octave Gilbert)

- Gilbert 1909 glider

=== Ginn-Lesniak ===
(Vic Ginn & Lesniak / London Gliding Club, Dunstable)

- Ginn-Lesniak Kestrel

=== Giuncu-Popa ===
(Octavian Giuncu & Ovidiu Popa / Atelierele de Reparaţii Material Volant - ARMV-2)

- Giuncu-Popa GP-2

=== Glaser-Dirks ===
See DG Flugzeugbau.

=== Glasfaser Velino ===
(Glasfaser Italiana SpA)

- Glasfaser Velino
- Glasfaser Nimeta - Nimbus 4 / Eta amalgam

=== Glasflügel ===
- Glasflügel BS-1 a.k.a. Björn Stender BS-1 or Stender BS-1
- Glasflügel H-30 GFK
- Glasflügel H-101 Salto
- Glasflügel H-201 Standard Libelle
- Glasflügel H-301 Libelle
- Glasflügel 202 Standard Libelle
- Glasflügel 203 Standard Libelle
- Glasflügel 204 Standard Libelle
- Glasflügel 205 Club Libelle
- Glasflügel 206 Hornet
- Glasflügel 303 Mosquito
- Glasflügel 304
- Glasflügel 401 Kestrel
- Glasflügel 402 Falconet
- Glasflügel 604

=== Glidersport ===
- Glidersport LightHawk

=== Gluhareff ===
Gluhareff M. S., Helsingfors (H. Adaridy & M.S. Gluhareff, Helsingfors)

- Gluhareff 3M
- Gluhareff S-22

=== Gnewikow ===
(Karl Gnewikow)

- Gnewikow Gne-3

=== Godwin ===
(C.G. Godwin)

- Godwin Two-seater glider

=== Gomolzig ===
See Caproni Vizzola.

=== Göppingen ===
(Martin Schempp / Wolf Hirth / Sportflugzeugbau Schempp-Hirth)

- Göppingen E-4
- Göppingen Gö 1 Wolf
- Göppingen Gö 2
- Göppingen Gö 3 Minimoa
- Göppingen Gö 4 Gövier
- Göppingen Gö 5
- Göppingen Gö 8

=== Gordon England ===
(E.C. Gordon England / Georges England Ltd, Walton-on-Thames, Surrey)

- Gordon England 1922 glider

=== Görlitz ===
(D.L.V. Gruppe Görlitz)

- Görlitz I

=== Gotha ===
(Gothaer Waggonfabrik)

- Gotha Go 242
- Gotha Go 244
- Gotha Go 345
- Kalkert (Gotha) Ka430

=== Göttingen ===
(Flieger Ortsgruppe Göttingen / Flavag - Fliegergruppe der Aerodynamischen Versuchsanstalt Göttingen / NSFK Ortsgruppe Göttingen )

- Göttingen IV Niedersachsen
- Flavag I Uhu
- Flavag II Kuckuck

=== GP Gliders ===
- GP 14 Velo

=== Graf von Saurma ===
- Graf von Saurma Milan

=== GRAL ===
(Groupe rouennais d'aviation légère)

- Gral 3
- Gral 5
- Gral 6
- Gral 7

=== Grandin ===
(Henry Grandin)

- Grandin Chauve-souris
- Grandin Mouette

=== Granneman ===
(Hans Granneman)

- Granneman HG-1 Tölpel

=== Green-Tweed ===
(Frank Green & George Tweed)

- Green-Tweed GT-2

=== Greif ===
(Greif Flugzeugbau Rendsburg)

- Greif I
- Greif II
- Greif III
- Greif IV
- Greif V-DSG

=== Gremyatsky ===
(Anatoli Grematsky)

- Gremyatsky Diskoplan

=== Gribovsky ===
(Vladislav K. Gribovsky)

- Gribovsky G-1
- Gribovsky G-2
- Gribovsky G-3
- Gribovsky G-6
- Gribovsky G-7
- Gribovsky G-9 Dzsunka
- Gribovsky G-11
- Gribovsky G-12
- Gribovsky G-14
- Gribovsky G-16
- Gribovsky G-18
- Gribovsky G-29
- Gribovsky G-31
- Gribovsky Sans-Abri

=== Grob ===
(GROB-WERKE Burkhart Grob e.K.)

- Grob G102 Astir
- Grob G103 Twin Astir
- Grob G 103a Twin II
- Grob G 103c Twin III
- Grob G 104 Speed Astir
- Grob G 109

=== Grodziska ===
- Grodziska Mazowieckiego

=== Grokhovskii ===
(Pavel Ignatyevich Grokhovskii)

- Grokhovskii G-31
- Grokhovskii G-63
- Grokhovskii GN-4
- Grokhovskii GN-8

=== Gropp ===
(Herbert Gropp)

- Gropp Zaunkönig

=== Groshev ===
(G.F. Groshev – USSR)

- Groshev G N° 2 TSK Komsomol
- Groshev G N° 6
- Groshev G N° 7
- Groshev GN-7
- Groshev GN-4
- Groshev GN-8

=== Gross ===
(Dr. Frank R. Gross)

- Akron Condor
- Baker-McMillan Cadet
- Gross Sky Ghost
- Gross F-5

=== Grossklaus ===
(Helmut Grossklaus)

- Grossklaus Silent Glider M
- Grossklaus Silent Glider ME
- Grossklaus Silent Racer

=== Group Genesis ===
- Group Genesis Genesis 1 (prototype)
- Genesis 2 (production model)

=== Groux ===
(Georges Groux)

- Groux

=== Gruse ===
(Maschinenfabrik August Gruse)

- Gruse Bo 15/1

=== Grzeszczyk ===
(Szczepan Grzeszczyk)

- Grzeszczyk SG-3
- Grzeszczyk SG-7
- Grzeszczyk SG-21 Lwów
- Grzeszczyk SG-28

=== Grzmilas ===
(Tadeusz Grzmilas)

- Grzmilas Orkan I (Whirlwind I) No.10 – Second Polish Glider Contest 17 May – 15 June 1925

=== Guerchais-Roche ===
(Établissement Roche / Ateliers Roche Aviation)

- Guerchais-Roche GR-70
- Guerchais-Roche SA-103 Emouchet
- Guerchais-Roche SA-104 Emouchet
- Guerchais-Roche GR-105
- Guerchais-Roche GR-107

=== Guignard ===
(Donat Guignard)

- Guignard 1934
- Guignard Chanute

=== Guilhabert ===
(Msr. Guilhabert from Gaillac, France)

- Guilhabert Pou-Planeur

=== Gumpert ===
(Bruno Gumpert)

- Gumpert G.1
- Gumpert G.2
- Gumpert Schwalbe II – Gumpert, Bruno – Segelfliegergruppe des I/K.G. Wiener Neustadt

=== Günar ===
- Günar 1

=== GVV Dal Molin ===
(Grupo Volo a Vela Tommaso Dal Molin))

- GVV Dal Molin MD.1 Anfibio Varese
- GVV Dal Molin Anfibio Roma

=== Gyõr ===
(Gyõr Soaring Club, Gyõr - Aeroclub of the Rolling-stock Factory, Gyõr)

- Gyõr-2 (Ã. Lampich)
- Gyõr-3 Motor-Pilis (Ernõ Rubik)

=== Gysas ===
(A. Gysas)

- Gysas Nykstukas
- Gysas Zaibas
