= GHW =

GHW may refer to:

- Girdhariwala railway station, in Pakistan
- Ghw (trigraph), a Latin-script trigraph

== See also ==
- George H. W. Bush, 41st president of the United States
- Wiederkehr GHW-1 Cu-Climber, a glider
