= Wassmer WA-51 Pacific =

WA-51 Pacific
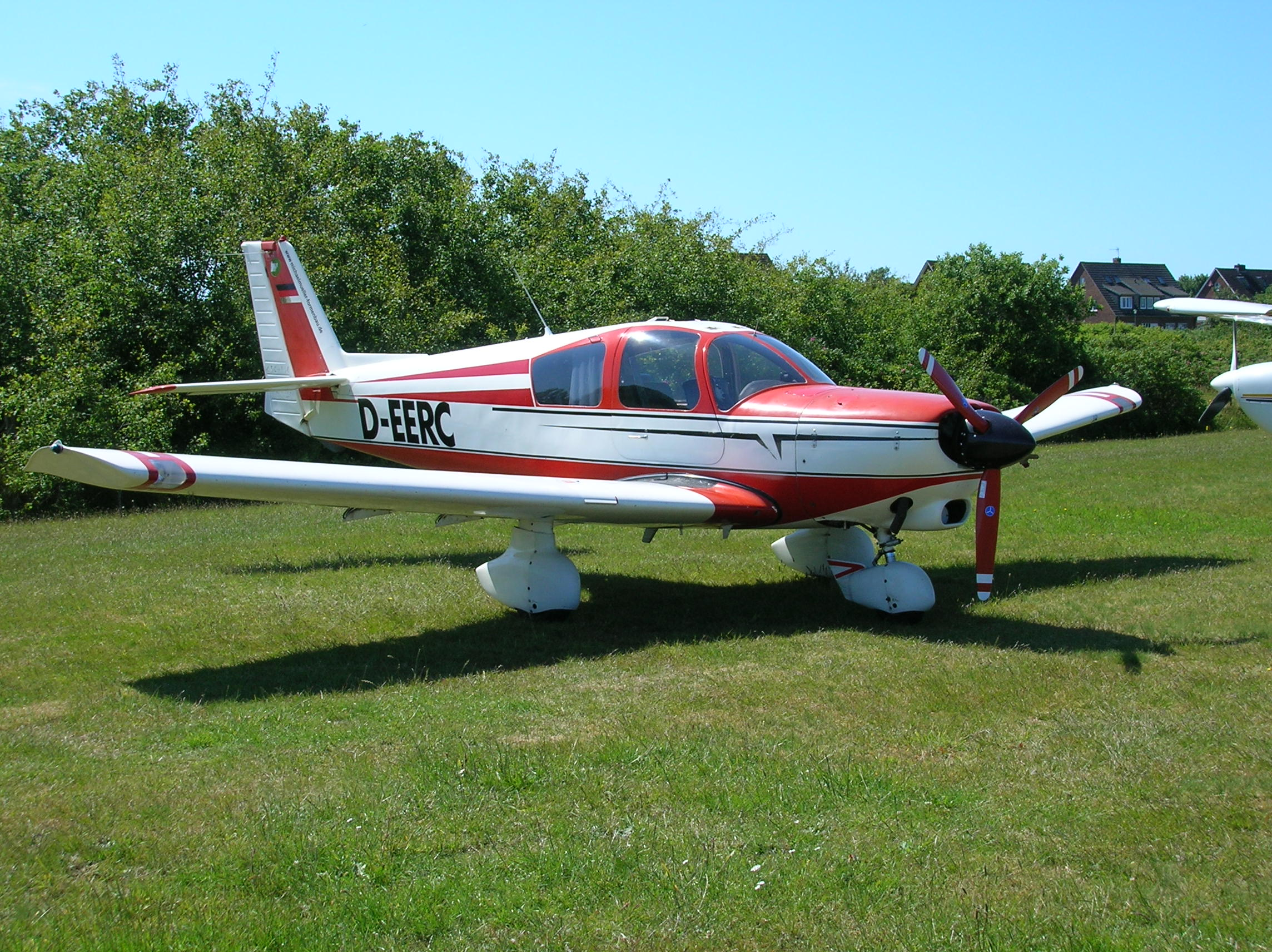
- Wassmer WA-54 Atlantic

General information
- Type: Four-seat cabin monoplane
- National origin: France
- Manufacturer: Société Wassmer
- Number built: 154

History
- Manufactured: 1969–1977
- First flight: 18 March 1966

The Wassmer WA-51 Pacific is a French four-seat cabin monoplane designed and built by Société Wassmer. Different-powered variants include the Wassmer WA-52 Europa and the Wassmer WA-54 Atlantic. It was the world's first composite material-built aircraft.

== Design and development ==
Having manufactured glass-fibre cowlings for Bébé, D112 and D120 Jodels, increasing number of glass-fibre parts for their Javelot, Bijave and Super-Javelot gliders, and then Super-IV aircraft, in 1966 Wassmer first flew the glass-fibre WA-50 prototype, a single-engined four-seat cabin monoplane with a retractable tricycle landing gear. Originally designed as a three-seater powered by a 115cv Potez engine, engine unavailability at the time resulted in a 150cv Lycoming O-320 being used instead and the aircraft becoming a 4-seater. Using the same profile as the Super-IV but only 8.6m span, and compensated with large slotted flaps, the wings were formed from two moulded halves and contained two 70 litre fuel tanks. The fuselage was also manufactured as two halves, and featured butterfly doors.

The design entered production as the WA-51 Pacific with a fixed tricycle landing gear. The low-wing cantilever monoplane was powered by a nose-mounted 150 hp (112 kW) Lycoming O-320-E2A piston engine. A variant, powered by a 160 hp (119 kW) Lycoming IO-320-B1A was called the WA-52 Europa. Further refinements produced the 180 hp (134 kW) Lycoming O-360-A1LD powered WA-54 Atlantic.

== Variants ==
WA-50
Prototype with retractable landing gear and powered by 150 hp (110 kW) Lycoming O-360-E engine, first flew 22 March 1966, one built, registration F-WNZZ. Fuselage is color molded with integral leading edge fuel tanks.
WA-51 Pacific
Production version first flown in 1969 with fixed undercarriage and powered by a 150 hp (110 kW) Lycoming O-320-E2C engine, 39 built.
WA-52 Europa
As WA-51 with a 160 hp (120 kW) Lycoming IO-320-D1F engine, 59 built.
WA-53
Proposed variant with a 125 hp (93 kW) Lycoming engine, not built.
WA-54 Atlantic
WA-51 with refinements and a 180 hp (130 kW) Lycoming O-360-A1LD engine, 55 built.

== Specifications (WA-54 Atlantic) ==
3-view line drawing of the Wassmer WA-54

Data from Encyclopedia of The World's Commercial and Private Aircraft

General characteristics

- Crew: 1 (pilot)
- Capacity: 3 (passengers)
- Length: 7.50 m (24 ft 7 in)
- Wingspan: 9.40 m (30 ft 10 in)
- Height: 2.26 m (7 ft 5 in)
- Wing area: 12.40 m^{2} (133.5 sq ft)
- Airfoil: NACA 63-418
- Empty weight: 620 kg (1,367 lb)
- Gross weight: 1,130 kg (2,491 lb)
- Fuel capacity: 150 L (40 US gal; 33 imp gal)
- Powerplant: 1 × Lycoming O-360-A1LD , 130 kW (180 hp)
- Propellers: 2-bladed McCauley variable-pitch propeller, 1.85 m (6 ft 1 in) diameter

Performance

- Maximum speed: 280 km/h (174 mph, 151 kn) at sea level
- Cruise speed: 260 km/h (162 mph, 140 kn) at 1,700 m (5,500 ft)
- Never exceed speed: 360 km/h (224 mph, 194 kn)
- Range: 1,340 km (830 mi, 720 nmi)
- Service ceiling: 4,500 m (14,800 ft)
- Take-off run to 15 m (50 ft): 300 m (984 ft)
- Landing run from 15 m (50 ft): 400 m (1,312.336 ft)

== See also ==
- Windecker Eagle

== Bibliography ==
- Battarel, Michel (1966). Chez Wassmer, l'avion "tout plastique" devient une réalité. Air et Cosmos, 141 pp. 36–38
- Fricker, John (October 1966). "Foreign Accent". Flying. Vol. 79, no. 4. p. 31.
- The Illustrated Encyclopedia of Aircraft (Part Work 1982–1985). Orbis Publishing.
- Mondey, David (1981). Encyclopedia of The World's Commercial and Private Aircraft. New York: Crescent Books. ISBN 0-517-362856.
- Simpson, R.W. Airlife's General Aviation. England: Airlife Publishing. p. 336. ISBN 1-85310-194-X.
- Simpson, R. W. (1995). Airlife's General Aviation (Second ed.). Shrewsbury, UK: Airlife Publishing. ISBN 1-85310-577-5.
- Taylor, John W. R., ed. (1977). Jane's All the World's Aircraft 1977–78. London: Jane's Yearbooks. ISBN 0-354-00551-0.
- Taylor, Michael J. H. (1989). Jane's Encyclopedia of Aviation. London: Studio Editions.
