= Wassmer =

Logo of the company.

Wassmer was a French specialized woodworking company formed by Bernard Wassmer in 1905. It later became an aircraft manufacturer specializing in gliders. It was bought out by Issoire Aviation, a subsidiary of Siren, in 1978.

== Aircraft production ==
The company entered into aircraft production in 1955 when it produced under licence a batch of Jodel D.112 two-seater aircraft at its factory at Issoire. The company also produced the single-seat WA-20 and two-seat WA-30 gliders. In 1959 the company produced the WA-40 Super IV a four-seat touring aircraft.

In 1972 in co-operation with Siren they formed a joint company Consortium Europeén de Réalisation et de Ventes d'Avions (CERVA) to build a metal variant of the WA4/21, itself a variant of the WA-40. The components for the Cerva CE.43 Guépard were manufactured by Siren at Argenton-sur-Creuse and final assembly, equipment fitting and flight testing was carried out by Wassmer at Issoire. The company also co-operated with the CE-75 sailplane.

In a move-away from the traditional woodworking heritage of the company it soon developed the ability to produce plastic or composite construction which led to the WA-50 series of four-seat aircraft. The company's last aircraft design was the WA-80 Piranha a two-seat trainer which was a scaled-down version of the WA-50.

With both the WA-80 and different variants of the WA-50 in production the company had working capital problems. A receiver was appointed in 1977, and production was stopped. On 1 February 1978 Issoire Aviation, a company set up by Siren, bought the assets of Wassmer and used the former Issoire factory to build gliders and to continue to support Wassmer products.

== Wassmer aircraft ==
- Jodel D.112 & D.120 (license-production)
- Wassmer WA-20 Javelot
- Wassmer WA-26 Squale
- Wassmer WA-28 Espadon
- Wassmer WA-30 Bijave
- Wassmer WA-40 Super IV/Baladou/Prestige
- Wassmer WA-50 Pacific/Europa/Atlantic
- Wassmer WA-80 Piranha

== Cerva aircraft ==
- Cerva CE.43 Guépard
- Cerva CE.44 Cougar
- Cerva CE.45 Léopard
- Cerva CE.75 Silene
