= Wassmer WA-80 =

WA-80 Piranha
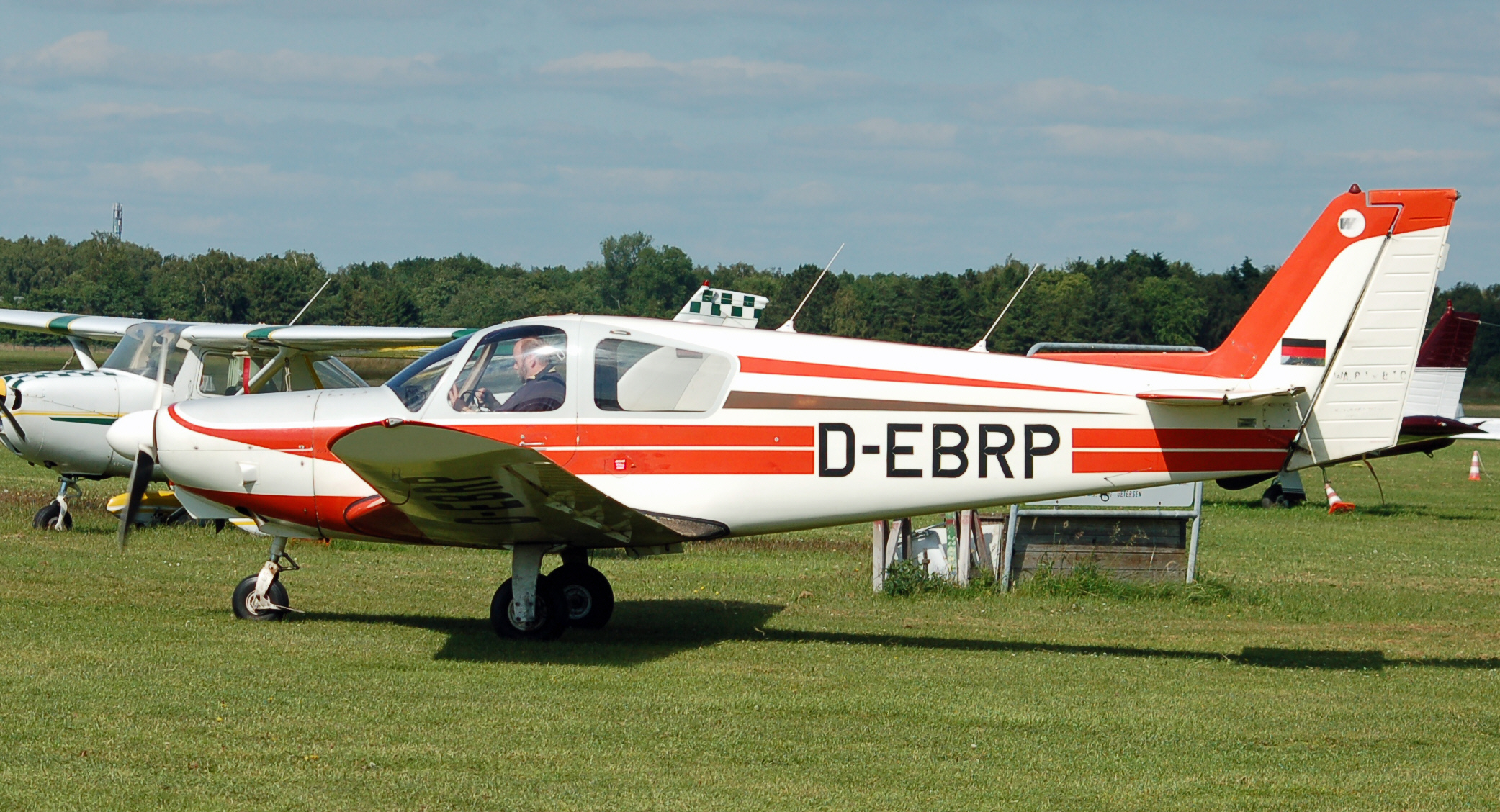
- Wassmer WA-81 Piranha

General information
- Type: Two-seat trainer
- National origin: France
- Manufacturer: Société Wassmer
- Number built: 25

History
- First flight: November 1975

The Wassmer WA-80 Piranha is a French two-seat low-wing cabin monoplane trainer designed and built by Société Wassmer. Based on the same construction as the company's WA-50 four-seater, the WA-80 was a scaled down version. The prototype, registered F-WVKR, first flew in November 1975 powered by a 100 hp Rolls-Royce Continental O-200 engine. Wassmer appointed a receiver and suspended production in 1977 after 25 had been built.

== Variants ==
WA-80 Piranha
Two-seater with a 100 hp Rolls-Royce Continental O-200-A engine, six built.
WA-81 Piranha
WA-80 fitted with an extra third rear seat, 18 built.

== Specifications (WA-80) ==
Data from Jane's All the World's Aircraft 1976–77

General characteristics

- Crew: 2
- Length: 7.50 m (24 ft 7 in)
- Wingspan: 9.40 m (30 ft 10 in)
- Height: 2.10 m (6 ft 11 in)
- Wing area: 12.40 m^{2} (133.5 sq ft)
- Aspect ratio: 7.1:1
- Airfoil: NACA 63418
- Empty weight: 500 kg (1,102 lb)
- Max takeoff weight: 800 kg (1,764 lb)
- Fuel capacity: 90 L (20 imp gal; 24 US gal)
- Powerplant: 1 × Rolls-Royce Continental O-200-A air-cooled flat-four engine, 75 kW (100 hp)

Performance

- Maximum speed: 240 km/h (150 mph, 130 kn) at sea level
- Cruise speed: 190 km/h (120 mph, 100 kn) (max. cruise)
- Stall speed: 80 km/h (50 mph, 43 kn) (flaps down)
- Never exceed speed: 302 km/h (188 mph, 163 kn)
- Range: 700 km (430 mi, 380 nmi)
- Service ceiling: 4,000 m (13,000 ft)
- Rate of climb: 3.5 m/s (690 ft/min)
- Takeoff run to 15 m (50 ft): 300 m (980 ft)
- Landing run from 15 m (50 ft): 300 m (980 ft)
