= Gehrlein =

Gehrlein is a surname. Notable people with the surname include:

- Stephanie Gehrlein (born 1982), German tennis player
- William Gehrlein (born 1946), American academic

== See also ==
- Gehrlein GP-1, is an American mid-wing, single seat FAI Standard Class glider
- Gehrlein Precursor, is an American high-wing single seat glider
