= Cerva CE.43 Guépard =

CE.43 Guépard
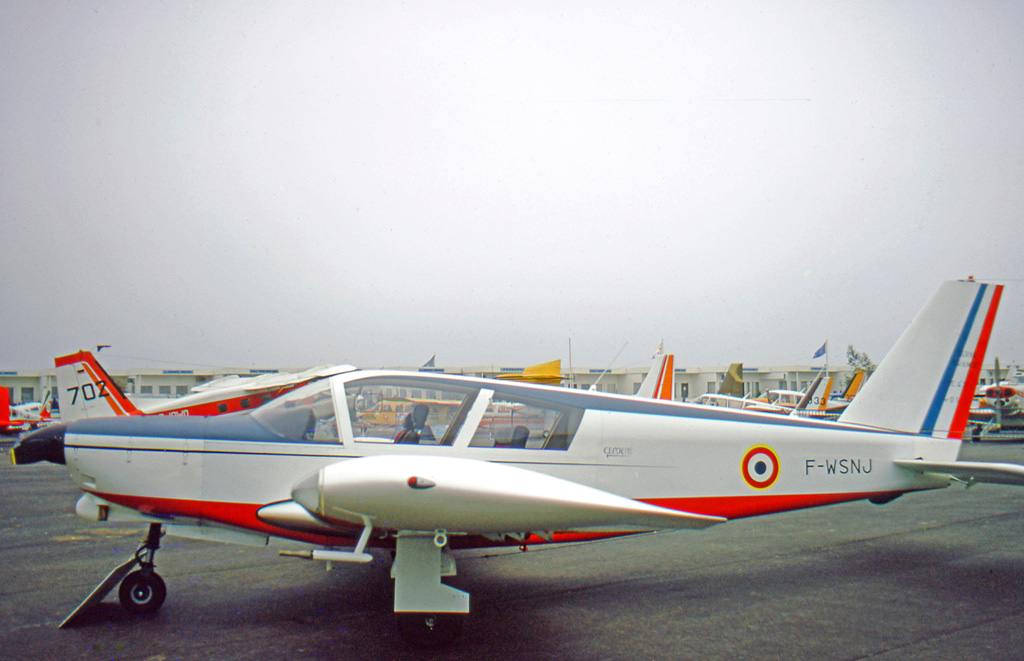
- The prototype CE 43 Guepard displayed at the June 1971 Paris Air Show in French Air Force Markings

General information
- Type: four/five seat cabin monoplane
- Manufacturer: Cerva
- Primary users: French Air Force private owner pilots
- Number built: 44

History
- First flight: 18 May 1971
- Developed from: Wassmer WA.4/21

The Cerva CE.43 Guépard is a 1970s French four/five seat cabin monoplane produced by Cerva.

== Design and development ==
The Cerva CE.43 Guépard (English: Cheetah) is an all-metal version of the Wassmer WA.4/21. The WA.4/21 prototype first flew in March 1967. Construction is a steel-tube with a fabric covered fuselage and plywood-covered wing. Wassmer decided to produce an alternate all-metal version and teamed up with Siren SA to form a joint-company known as Consortium Europeén de Réalisation et de Ventes d'Avions (CERVA). The two aircraft have identical dimensions but the all-metal Guépard is heavier.

The prototype Guépard was first flown on 18 May 1971 and was exhibited at the 1971 Paris Air Show. The aircraft was certified on 1 June 1972, and the French government ordered eight aircraft for the Service de la Formation Aéronautique (SFA), and 18 aircraft for use as communications aircraft by the Centre D'Essais en Vol (CEV) of the French Air Force. First deliveries to private customers began in 1975 and by the time production ended in 1976 44 aircraft had been produced with some being exported including to Finland.

Components for the Guépard were manufactured by Siren at Argenton-sur-Creuse and final assembly, equipment fit and flight testing was carried out by Wassmer at Issoire. Two new versions were developed, the CE.44 Couguar (English: Cougar) powered by a 285 hp (213 kW) Continental Tiara 6-285 engine, and the CE.45 Léopard powered by a 310 hp (231 kW) Avco Lycoming TIO-540. Development stopped when the Wassmer company went into liquidation in 1977.

== Operators ==
France

- French Air Force (Centre D'Essais en Vol)
- French Navy

== Specifications (CE.43 Guépard) ==
Data from Jane's All The World's Aircraft 1976–77

General characteristics

- Crew: 1
- Capacity: 4 passengers
- Length: 7.85 m (25 ft 9 in)
- Wingspan: 10.00 m (32 ft 10 in)
- Height: 2.90 m (9 ft 6 in)
- Wing area: 16.0 m^{2} (172 sq ft)
- Airfoil: NACA 63-618
- Empty weight: 890 kg (1,962 lb)
- Max takeoff weight: 1,460 kg (3,219 lb)
- Fuel capacity: 220 L (48 imp gal; 58 US gal)
- Powerplant: 1 × Avco Lycoming IO-540-C4B5 air-cooled flat-six engine, 190 kW (250 hp)
- Propellers: 2-bladed Hartzell HC 22YK variable pitch propeller

Performance

- Maximum speed: 320 km/h (200 mph, 170 kn)
- Cruise speed: 280 km/h (170 mph, 150 kn)
- Never exceed speed: 350 km/h (220 mph, 190 kn)
- Range: 2,900 km (1,800 mi, 1,600 nmi)
- Service ceiling: 5,300 m (17,400 ft)
- g limits: +4.4, -2.2
- Rate of climb: 5.5 m/s (1,080 ft/min)
