= Windward Performance DuckHawk =

American glider

DuckHawk

General information
- Type: Glider
- National origin: United States
- Manufacturer: Windward Performance
- Status: Production completed (2016)

History
- First flight: 2011
- Developed from: Windward Performance SparrowHawk

The Windward Performance DuckHawk is an American mid-wing, single-seat, 15-metre class glider, that was designed and produced by Windward Performance of Bend, Oregon. It first flew in 2011.

Since 2016 the aircraft has been no longer advertised as available by the manufacturer.

== Design and development ==
The DuckHawk is a development of the Windward Performance SparrowHawk and is intended as a higher performance glider than its predecessor, with very high structural limits and V_{ne}. The DuckHawk has less than 10% parts commonality with the SparrowHawk. It features a cantilever wing, a single-seat enclosed cockpit under a bubble canopy and retractable monowheel gear.

The aircraft is made from preimpregnated carbon fiber. Its 15 m (49.2 ft) span wing employs a Greg Cole-designed airfoil, has an area of 80 sq ft (7.4 m^{2}) and an aspect ratio of 30:1.

== Operational history ==
By December 2016 four examples had been registered in the United States with the Federal Aviation Administration, including three "V" models and one "E" model.

== Variants ==
DuckHawk E
Electric motorglider version, first example registered with the FAA in 2011.
DuckHawk V (Veloce)
Base model with an empty weight of 390 lb (180 kg), a maximum gross weight of 960 lb (440 kg) and load limits of +7/-5g. The first example was registered with the FAA in 2014 and three have been built.
DuckHawk SV (Super Veloce)
Proposed model with a 64% thicker spar, thicker fuselage, an empty weight of 435 lb (197 kg), a maximum gross weight of 960 lb (440 kg) and load limits of +11/-9g. None completed.
DuckHawk VNX
Proposed model with thicker wing skins, an empty weight of 455 lb (206 kg), a maximum gross weight of 1,150 lb (520 kg), maximum speed of 225 kn (417 km/h) and load limits of +11/-9g. None completed.

== Specifications (DuckHawk V) ==
Data from Bayerl and Windward Performance

General characteristics

- Crew: one
- Length: 20.6 ft (6.3 m)
- Wingspan: 49.2 ft (15.0 m)
- Height: 3 ft 8 in (1.12 m)
- Wing area: 80 sq ft (7.4 m^{2})
- Aspect ratio: 30:1
- Airfoil: Greg Cole-designed
- Empty weight: 390 lb (177 kg)
- Gross weight: 960 lb (435 kg)

Performance

- Never exceed speed: 193 mph (311 km/h, 168 kn)
- g limits: +7/-5g
- Maximum glide ratio: 50:1
- Wing loading: 12 lb/sq ft (59 kg/m^{2})

== See also ==
Related development

- Windward Performance SparrowHawk

Related lists

- List of gliders
