= Whigham GW-6 =

American glider

GW-6

General information
- Type: Glider
- National origin: United States
- Designer: Gene Whigham
- Number built: one

History
- Introduction date: 1983
- First flight: 1983

The Whigham GW-6 is an American mid-wing, single-seat, glider that was designed and constructed by Gene Whigham, a retired flight test engineer for Convair.

== Design and development ==
Whigham completed and flew the GW-6 in 1983. The aircraft was intended to be a very lightweight glider and incorporated some design innovations to achieve that goal. The wing spar was built up from extruded angles, with a sheet aluminium spar web. The wing ribs are made from sheet aluminium and the wing is covered in doped aircraft fabric covering. The wing has large ailerons, a 22:1 aspect ratio and a 44 ft (13.4 m) span. The tailplane and elevator are small in size. The normal flight centre of gravity is at 35% of chord, which is more aft than usual with the NACA 43012A airfoil employed.

Only one GW-6 was constructed and it was registered with the Federal Aviation Administration as an Experimental - Amateur-built.

== Operational history ==
Soaring Magazine reported that the GW-6 had about 65 hours of flying time by late in the summer of 1983, Whigham having flown it that season while building the GW-7. In July 2011 the aircraft was still on the FAA registry and owned by John B. Waters of San Diego, California.

== Specifications (GW-6) ==
Data from Soaring

General characteristics

- Crew: one
- Wingspan: 44 ft 0 in (13.41 m)
- Wing area: 88 sq ft (8.2 m^{2})
- Aspect ratio: 22:1
- Airfoil: NACA 43012A
- Empty weight: 323 lb (147 kg)
- Gross weight: 570 lb (259 kg)

Performance

- Maximum glide ratio: 32:1
- Wing loading: 6.47 lb/sq ft (31.6 kg/m^{2})

== See also ==
Related lists

- List of gliders
