= Warsztaty Szybowcowe SG-7 =

SG-7
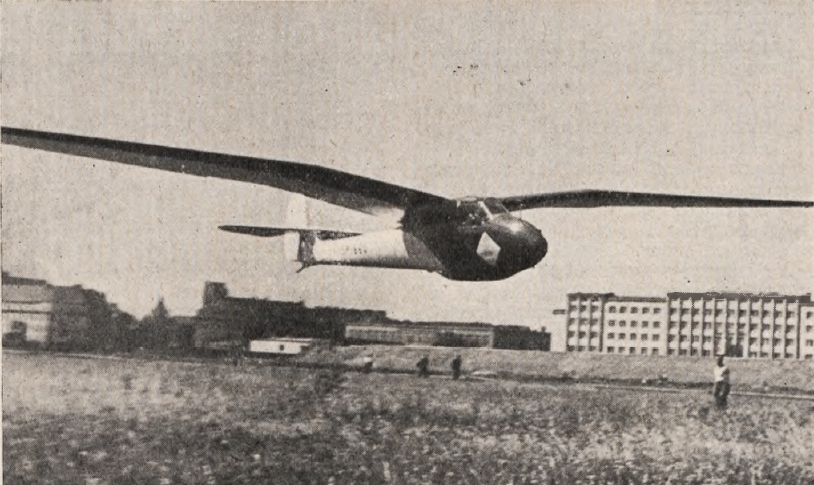

General information
- Type: Single seat, high performance sailplane
- National origin: Poland
- Manufacturer: Warsztaty Szybowcowe
- Designer: Szczepan Grzezezyk
- Number built: 2

History
- First flight: Spring 1937
- Developed from: Warsztaty Szybowcowe SG-3

The Warsztaty Szybowcowe SG-7 was a Polish high performance, single seat sailplane. Two prototypes flew in 1937 but, outperformed by their contemporaries, no more were built.

== Design and development ==
The SG-7, a development of the Warsztaty Szybowcowe SG-3 with reduced dimensions, was designed during 1936-7 to meet a government call for a high performance sailplane. It first flew in the late spring of 1937, followed in July by a second and final airframe.

The SG-7 was a wooden aircraft with a two-part, cantilever, high gull wing. Each part was built around a single spar which acted as the rear member of a torsion-resistant D-box formed with plywood surfacing around the leading edge. Behind the spar the wing was fabric-covered apart from a ply reinforced region at the join over the fuselage. The wing was trapezoidal in plan out to rounded tips, with differential ailerons over more than half the span.

Its fuselage was an oval-section, semi-monocoque plywood structure with the wing mounted above it on a faired pylon. Its enclosed cockpit was ahead of the pylon. The fuselage tapered aft to a narrow, integral fin which carried a fabric-covered, roughly D-shaped unbalanced rudder. The fin also mounted, a little above the fuselage, a narrow, ply-covered tailplane carrying rounded, fabric-covered elevators with a gap for rudder movement. The landing gear consisted of an under-fuselage, pneumatically sprung skid, assisted by a tailskid.

When competed, the SG-7s were 28 kg (62 lb) overweight, reducing their predicted performance.

== Operational history ==
One SG-7 appeared at the 1937 Scout Jamboree, held in the Netherlands in late July and in early August the other competed at the Fifth National Glider Cpntest in Inowrocław but only achieved 26th place. Though it flew better at low speeds and in turbulent conditions than the PWS-101 and the Warsztaty Szybowcowe Orlik it was otherwise inferior in performance and manoeuvrability and so did not go into production. The two prototypes remained in use until 1939, when modifications were required to meet new requirements on structural safety in cloud flight. These had not been completed before the 1939 Invasion of Poland.

== Specifications ==
Data from Samolty

General characteristics

- Crew: One
- Length: 6.35 m (20 ft 10 in)
- Wingspan: 15.8 m (51 ft 10 in)
- Height: 1.65 m (5 ft 5 in)
- Wing area: 15.9 m^{2} (171 sq ft)
- Aspect ratio: 15.7
- Empty weight: 160 kg (353 lb)
- Gross weight: 243 kg (536 lb)

Performance

- Maximum speed: 200 km/h (120 mph, 110 kn)
- Maximum glide ratio: 22 optimum at 73.6 km/h (45.7 mph; 39.7 kn)
- Rate of sink: 0.8 m/s (160 ft/min) minimum at 58 km/h (36 mph; 31 kn)
- Minimum speed: 50 km/h (31 mph; 27 kn)
