= Warsztaty Szybowcowe Mewa =

Mewa
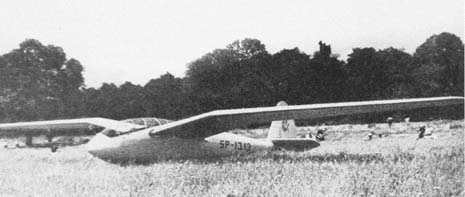

General information
- Type: High performance two seat sailplane
- National origin: Poland
- Manufacturer: Warsztaty Szybowcowe
- Designer: Szczepan Grzeszczyk and Antoni Kocjan
- Number built: at least 8

History
- First flight: Early 1936

The Warsztaty Szybowcowe Mewa was a Polish, high performance, two seat sailplane flown in 1936 and built in small numbers.

== Design and development ==
In 1935, Szczepan Grzeszczyk and Antoni Kocjan collaborated in the design of the Mewa, an aerodynamically clean, high performance, two seat sailplane. Its first flights were made early in the following year, though it was not ready for competition until 1937.

The Mewa was a wooden aircraft with a two-part, cantilever, shoulder-mounted gull wing. Each part was built around a single spar which acted as the rear member of a torsion-resistant D-box formed with plywood surfacing around the leading edge. Behind the spar, which was assisted by an internal diagonal drag strut to the fuselage, the wing was fabric-covered. The high dihedral, inner part of the wing was rectangular in plan but the outer wing was trapezoidal, tapering to rounded tips. The outer wings carried long, narrow-chord, differential Frise ailerons outboard with mid-chord, upper-surface air brakes inboard.

The Mewa's fuselage was an oval-section, semi-monocoque, plywood structure. The two crew sat in tandem, with dual controls, under a long, multi-part transparency. This extended rearwards over the wing, allowing the second seat to be positioned over the centre of gravity to avoid re-trimming when occupied. A broad, semi-elliptical, balanced rudder, fabric-covered except on its balance, was mounted on a small fin which was part of the fuselage structure. Close to its root, the fin carried an all-flying tail, fitted with Flettner tabs and also largely fabric-covered.

The landing gear consisted of an under-fuselage, pneumatically sprung skid, assisted by a tailskid under the rudder.

== Operational history ==
Its first significant competition was the Fifth National Glider Contest held at Ustianowa in June-July 1937 where the prototype, flown by Mieczysław Urban, came third. In 1938 a production batch of five was built, the first flying in the spring. Four took part in the Sixth National Glider Contest, held at Inowrocław, though the best only reached ninth place. The production Mewas went to clubs, where one was for used for blind flying training as well as the usual high performance instruction. They set national duration and distance records for two seat gliders: in April 1939 J. Pietrow and W. Dziergas flew for 11 h 2 min and in May Pietrow and J. Jakubiec covered 302 km (188 mi; 163 nmi).

Mewas were also built under licence in Estonia and in Yugoslavia, where one remained in use into the 1950s.

== Specifications ==
Data from J. Cynk, 1971 unless noted

General characteristics

- Crew: Two
- Length: 7.3 m (23 ft 11 in)
- Wingspan: 17 m (55 ft 9 in)
- Height: 1.3 m (4 ft 3 in)
- Wing area: 20.5 m^{2} (221 sq ft)
- Aspect ratio: 13.2
- Empty weight: 190 kg (419 lb)
- Gross weight: 355 kg (783 lb)

Performance

- Maximum glide ratio: 25.6 best at 64 km/h (40 mph; 35 kn)
- Rate of sink: 0.7 m/s (140 ft/min) at 55 km/h (34 mph; 30 kn) (seating two)
- Minimum speed: 49 km/h (30 mph; 26 kn)
