= General Aircraft GAL.56 =

General Aircraft Family

GAL.56
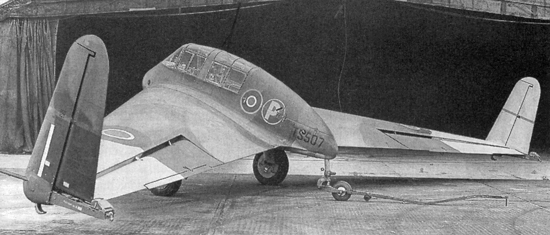
- GAL.56/01

General information
- Type: Experimental tailless gliders
- National origin: United Kingdom
- Manufacturer: General Aircraft Ltd
- Number built: 4

History
- First flight: November 1944

The General Aircraft GAL.56 was a family of 1940s British experimental tailless swept wing glider designs.

== Background ==
In July 1943, the Tailless Aircraft Advisory Committee was set up under the Directorate of Scientific Research, within the Ministry of Aircraft Production. The purpose was to investigate the future possible use of tailless and tail-first concepts. In 1944, contract Acft/3303/CB.10(c) was issued to GAL for the construction and development of four unpowered proof-of-concept aircraft, three later designated as GAL.56, plus one GAL.61.

== Design ==
The three GAL.56 variants employed the same fuselage design, married to three different wing designs. The fuselage of the GAL.56 was constructed of steel tubes and wooden ribs, covered in moulded plywood sheeting. Accommodation was for pilot and observer, in tandem cockpits. For each variant, the wings were constructed of laminated wood spars and ribs, covered in wood/paper laminated skins. Each wing was attached to the fuselage by a joint via which the dihedral could be pre-set before flight. Elevons were provided to act as elevators for pitch control, and as servo-assisted ailerons for roll control. Two sets of split flaps were installed, of which either set could be selected before flight. A fin and rudder was mounted at each wingtip. The fixed main undercarriage struts, using existing components, were attached to the wing spars, and an extended tailwheel attached to the rear of the fuselage pod.

== Variants ==
GAL.56/01
(serial number TS507) Also known as the "Medium-V" version, had a constant 33.5 deg wing sweepback at the leading edge, 28.4 deg at quarter chord. On 13 November 1944, Robert Kronfeld piloted the first flight at Farnborough, towed by an Armstrong Whitworth Whitley.
GAL.56/04
(TS510) Also known as the "Medium-U" version, had the same swept wing planform as the GAL.56/01 mounted outboard of a constant chord centre section, total wingspan 51 ft (15.5 m). First flight was on 27 February 1946, at RAF Aldermaston.
GAL.56/03
(TS513) Also known as the "Maximum-V" version, had a constant 40 deg wing sweepback at the leading edge, 36.4 deg at quarter chord. Wingspan was the same as GAL.56/01. First flight was on 30 May 1946.
GAL.57
A version of the GAL.56 powered by a 215 hp (160 kW) Lycoming R-680 radial engine, designed in 1943 but not built.
GAL.61
(TS515) A flying wing with no fuselage or fins, and incorporated retractable tricycle landing gear. It had a raised cockpit for a pilot, offset to port side, and a prone-position in the starboard wing for an observer.

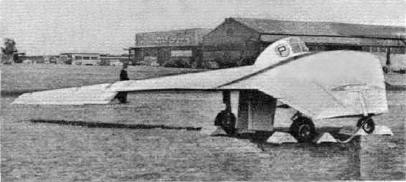
GAL.61

== Operational history ==
The GAL.56/01 conducted numerous flights from RAF Dunholme Lodge and RAF Wittering, variously towed by a Whitley, Supermarine Spitfire, or a Handley Page Halifax. After May 1945, research flights continued at Farnborough, and in August 1947 it was transferred to the GAL Flight Test Department at Lasham Airfield, where the GAL.56/03 and GAL.56/04 were already employed for trials under contract to the Air Ministry.

Its flying characteristics proved so bad that test pilot Capt. Eric "Winkle" Brown RN later described it as the most difficult aircraft he ever flew, out of the many hundreds of types that he tested. On 12 February 1948, the GAL.56/01 was conducting a stalling trial after being towed to 10,000 ft by a Halifax. The pilot, Robert Kronfeld, initiated a stall that progressed into an uncontrollable dive that caused both crew to lose consciousness. The observer, Barry MacGowan, awoke to find that the aircraft was level but inverted. He baled out successfully at low level, but Kronfeld died in the crash at Lower Froyle, near Lasham. As a result of the crash, and persistent stall problems on all tailless aircraft of the period, the research trials were terminated, the two other GAL.56s were transferred to the AFEE (Airborne Forces Experimental Establishment) at RAF Beaulieu, and the GAL.61 remained unflown.

== Specifications (GAL.56/01) ==
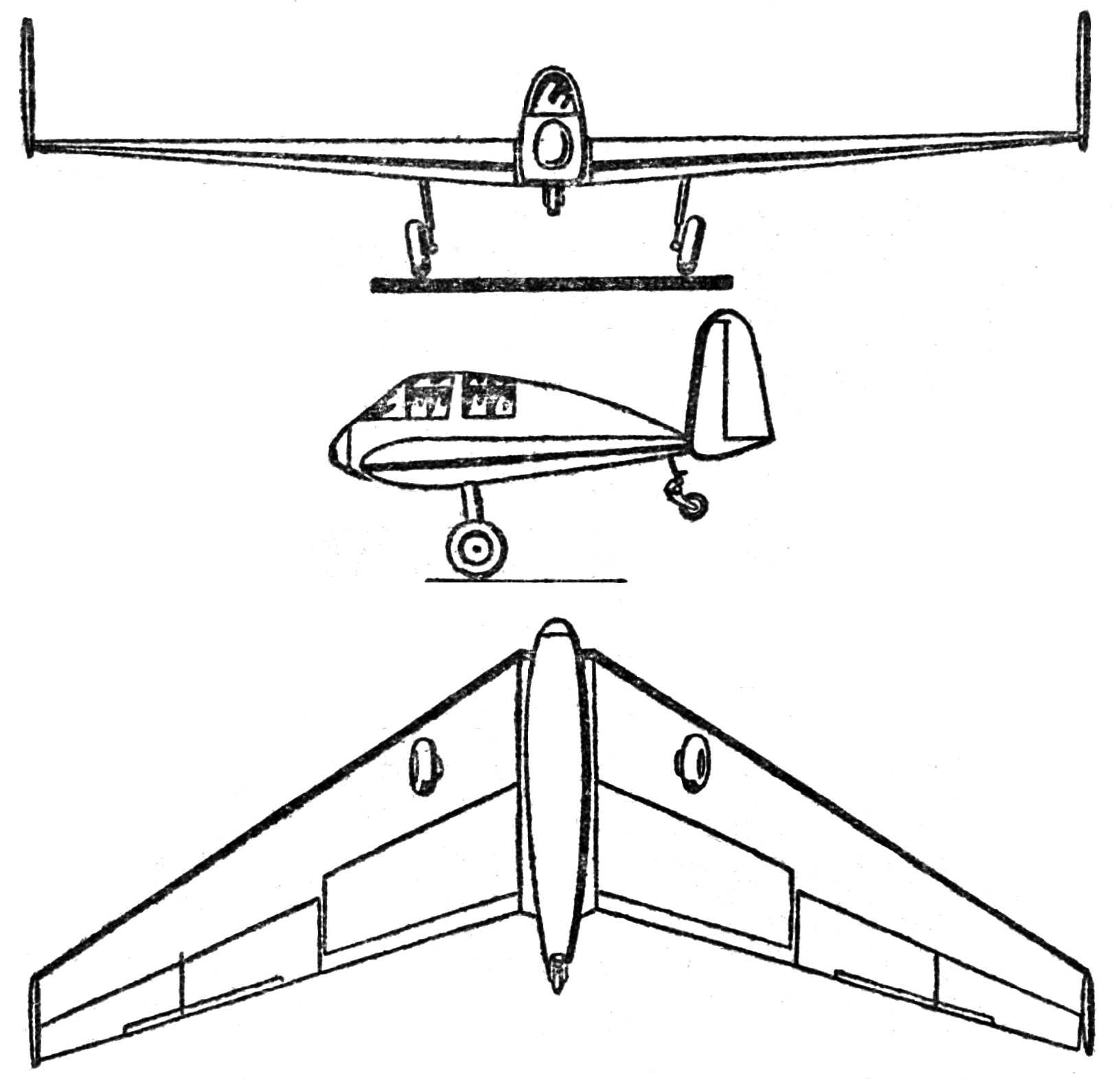
GAL 56 3-view drawing from Les Ailes January 4, 1947

Data from Flight 26 September 1946

General characteristics

- Crew: 2 (pilot and observer)
- Length: 18 ft 8 in (5.69 m)
- Wingspan: 45 ft 4 in (13.82 m)
- Height: 8 ft 9 in (2.67 m)
- Wing area: 350 sq ft (33 m^{2})
- Aspect ratio: 5.87
- Airfoil: RAF34 modified
- Empty weight: 3,405 lb (1,544 kg)
- Gross weight: 4,400 lb (1,996 kg)

Performance

- Stall speed: 58 mph (93 km/h, 50 kn)
- Never exceed speed: 200 mph (320 km/h, 170 kn)
- Wing loading: 12.57 lb/sq ft (61.4 kg/m^{2})
