= Windward Performance =

- Company type: Privately held company
- Industry: Aerospace
- Founder: Greg Cole
- Headquarters: Bend, Oregon, United States
- Products: Gliders
- Website: windward-performance.com

Windward Performance is an aircraft design house and manufacturer located in Bend, Oregon. The company is owned and led by Greg Cole. Windward Performance has helped numerous companies with technical expertise and in house they designed and developed the SparrowHawk ultralight sailplane and the DuckHawk high strength, high performance 15m sailplane.

The company also designed and built the Perlan II stratospheric glider which now holds the sailplane world altitude record at 52,172 ft.
