= Weber-Landholf-Münch WLM-1 =

WLM-1

General information
- Type: High performance training and racing glider
- National origin: Switzerland
- Manufacturer: Isler & Co., Wildegg
- Designer: Rudolf Sägesser
- Number built: 3

History
- First flight: 21 July 1947

The Weber-Landholf-Münch WLM-1 is a 1940s Swiss high performance sailplane designed to meet a Swiss Air Force (SAF) requirement for a training glider that could initiate potential fighter pilots. To this end it is fast, aerobatic and equipped with standard military instrumentation. Only three were built.

== Design and development ==
The WLM-1 is a high wing glider. It has an all-wood structure and, with the exception of the rudder, is entirely plywood covered. In plan the wing has straight taper out to rounded tips, with an unswept leading edge, and is built around two spars. It has a thin section with a thickness-to-chord ratio of only 13% at the root, reducing to 7% at the tip, and is set with 1.5° of dihedral. Slotted ailerons occupy about half the trailing edges and inboard slotted flaps the rest. The flaps can be set to deflections of 0°, 10° or 40° for fast gliding, soaring and landing respectively. When the flaps are down, the ailerons are lowered together by half the flap deflection. DFS-type metal spoilers, which open above and below the wing and can be used to limit speed to the allowed maximum, are mounted behind the rear spar at 68% chord.

The WLM-1 has a ply-covered, oval section, semi-monocoque fuselage. The cockpit is its most unusual feature, with the pilot on raised seating under a fighter-style bubble canopy with three separate, unbroken transparencies. The windscreen and aft parts, the latter reaching back above the wing almost to the rear spar, are fixed and the central hood removable; the resulting all-round view is exceptional. The cockpit is richly instrumented by glider standards to familiarize pilots with the standard fighter layout. The WLM-1's tail is conventional, with a short fin carrying a full, rounded, fabric-covered balanced rudder. Only its edges and balance are ply-covered. A narrow, triangular tailplane is mounted on the base of the fin and carries semi-elliptical plan elevators with large cut-outs for rudder movement. The glider's landing gear is also conventional, with a rubber-sprung forward skid and a tail-bumper on the extreme rear fuselage.

The WLM-1 first flew on 21 July 1947 from Lupfig. Sx months of rigorous testing followed, piloted by Rolf Isler. These included flutter tests at up to 340 km/h (210 mph; 180 kn), tows up to 290 km/h (180 mph; 160 kn) and a vertical dive from 2,500 m (8,200 ft) during which spoilers held the speed to 240 km/h (150 mph; 130 kn).

== Operational history ==
Though the Swiss Air Force had originally considered purchasing twelve WLM-1s, only three were built. They all competed in the 1948 World Gliding Championships, held in Samedan but did not excel. Their freedom from flutter at speed was noted but also their inability to exploit weak lift as well as several other competitors.

The first WLM-1 crashed in the spring of 1949 but the two survivors were used to prepare pilots for the SAF's de Havilland Vampires between 1949 and 1952; in 1953 the SAF began to receive two-seat Vampire trainers, making the WLM-1s redundant. The second example remained active until 1969, when it was lost in a spin at the end of a series of aerobatic manoeuvres.

The last example, HB-552, now belongs to the Air Force Museum "Clin d'Ailes" in Payerne. After a comprehensive restoration it remains active in 2019.

== Operators ==
Swiss Air Force

== Specifications ==
Data from The World's Sailplanes

General characteristics

- Crew: One
- Length: 7.0 m (23 ft 0 in)
- Wingspan: 14.0 m (45 ft 11 in)
- Wing area: 14.0 m^{2} (151 sq ft)
- Aspect ratio: 14.0
- Airfoil: NACA 23013 at root to NACA 23007 tip
- Empty weight: 210 kg (463 lb)
- Gross weight: 310 kg (683 lb)

Performance

- Maximum speed: 300 km/h (190 mph, 160 kn) placard, smooth air
- Stall speed: 46 km/h (29 mph, 25 kn) minimum, with full, 40° flap
- Maximum glide ratio: 25 best, with 3° flap and at 80 km/h (50 mph; 43 kn)
- Rate of sink: 0.80 m/s (157 ft/min) minimum, with 10° flap and at 65 km/h (40 mph; 35 kn)
