= Wassmer WA-30 Bijave =

French two-seat glider, 1958

WA-30 Bijave
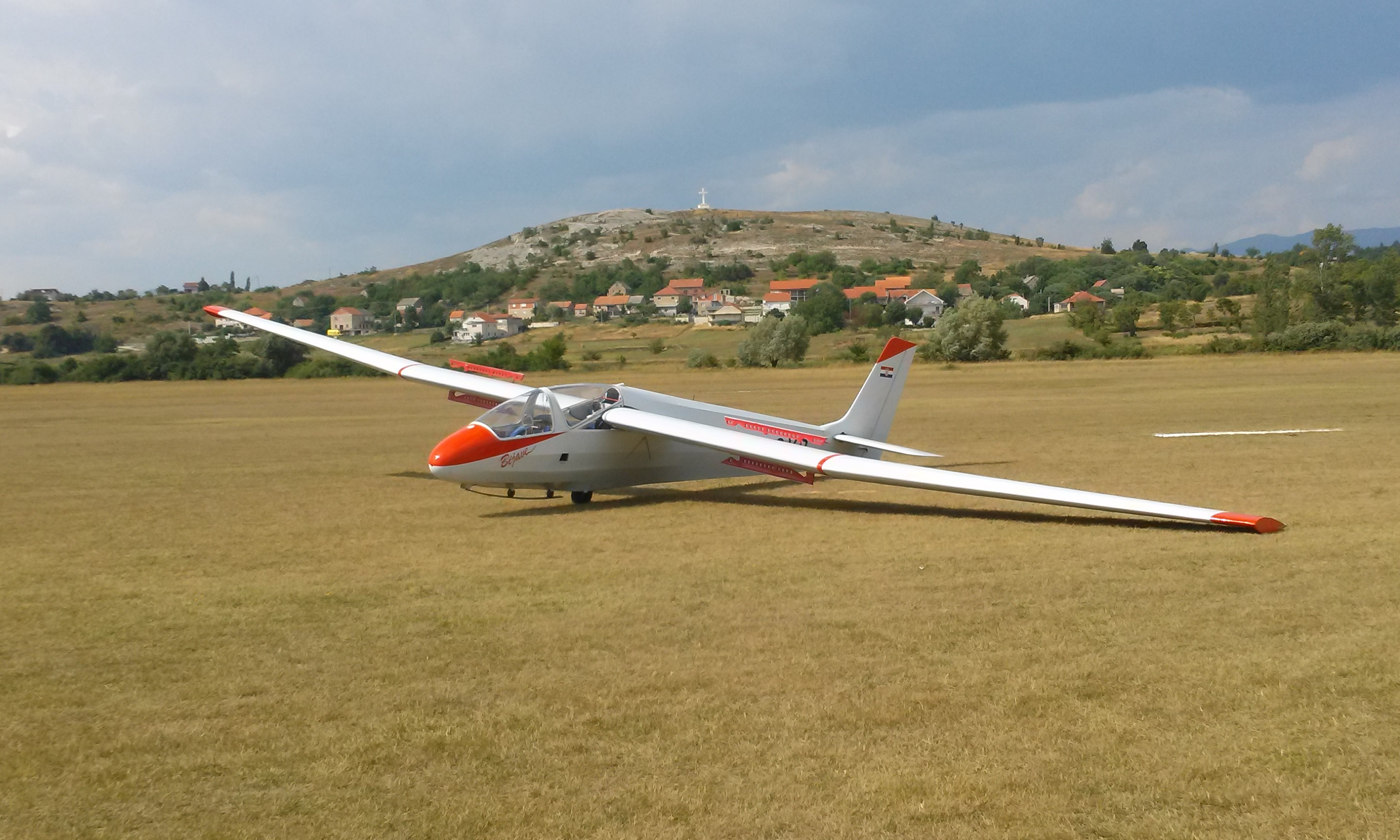

General information
- Type: Two-seat training glider
- National origin: France
- Manufacturer: Wassmer Aviation
- Number built: 285+

History
- First flight: 17 December 1958
- Developed from: Wassmer WA-21 Javelot

The Wassmer WA-30 Bijave is a French two-seat advanced training glider designed and built by Wassmer Aviation of Issoire.

== Design and development ==
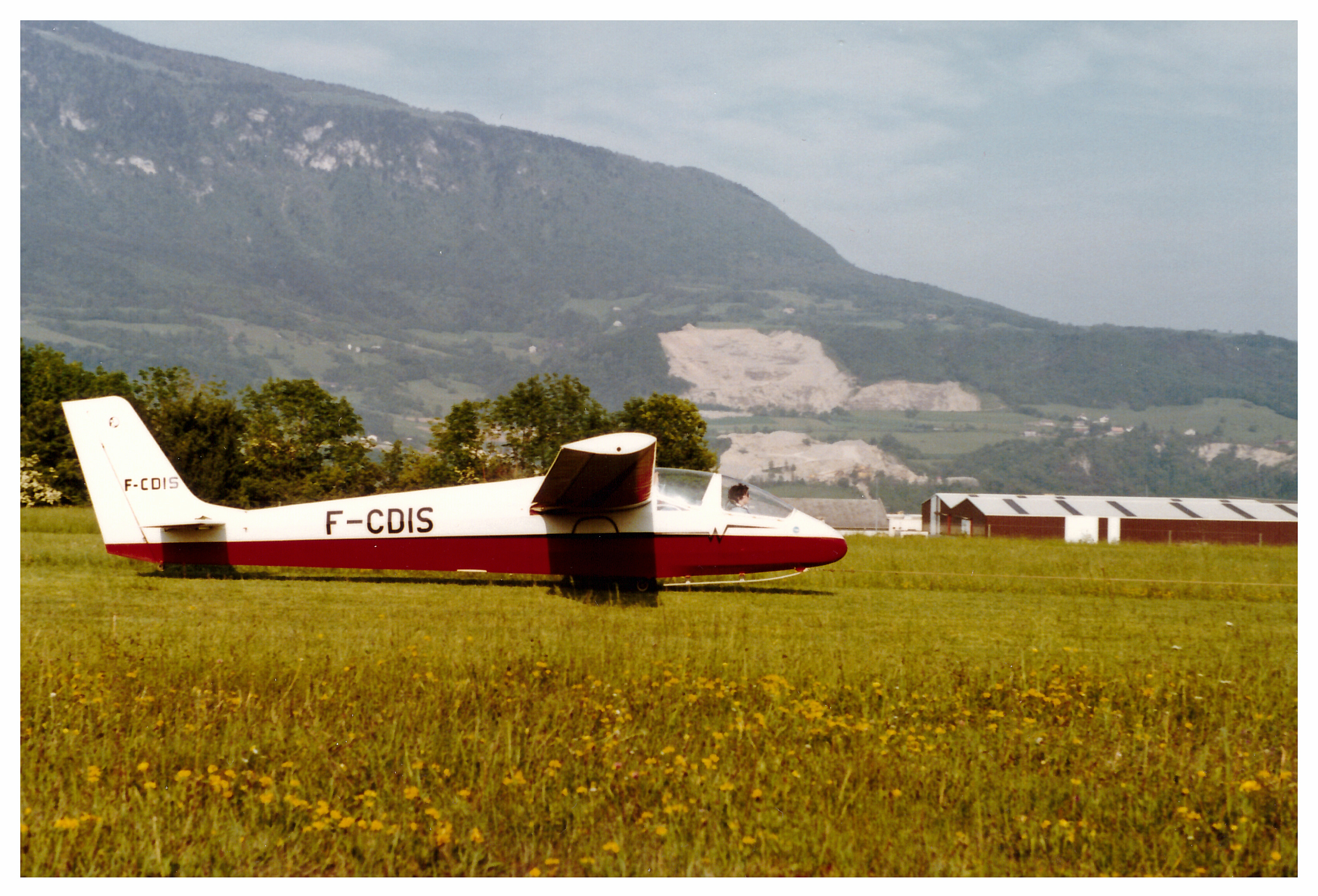
Wassmer 30 Bijave with factory decoration

The WA-30 Bijave is two-seat development of the Wassmer WA-21 Javelot II and the first Bijave flew on 17 December 1958 from Issoire Aerodrome. The Bijave is a cantilever shoulder-wing monoplane with a welded steel tube fuselage covered with fabric and reinforced plastic. The wing is made from wood, covered in birch forward of the spar and fabric to the rear, it has no flaps but is fitted with retractable perforated wooden airbrakes. The pilot and passenger sit in tandem in an enclosed cockpit with individual transparent canopies. The landing gear is a fixed monowheel, a wooden rubber-sprung skid under the nose and a steel tailskid.

== Specifications ==
3-view line drawing of the Wassmer WA-30

Data from Jane's All the World's Aircraft 1973-74 The World's Sailplanes:Die Segelflugzeuge der Welt:Les Planeurs du Monde Volume II

General characteristics

- Crew: 2
- Length: 9 m (29 ft 6 in)
- Wingspan: 16.85 m (55 ft 3 in)
- Height: 2.74 m (9 ft 0 in)
- Wing area: 19.2 m^{2} (207 sq ft)
- Aspect ratio: 15
- Airfoil: Root: NACA 63821, Tip: NACA 63415
- Empty weight: 295 kg (650 lb)
- Gross weight: 500 kg (1,102 lb)

Performance

- Stall speed: 60 km/h (37 mph, 32 kn)
- Never exceed speed: 200 km/h (120 mph, 110 kn)
- Rough air speed max: 150 km/h (93.2 mph; 81.0 kn)
- Aerotow speed: 130 km/h (80.8 mph; 70.2 kn)
- Winch launch speed: 100 km/h (62.1 mph; 54.0 kn)
- Terminal velocity: with full airbrakes 190 km/h (118 mph; 103 kn)
- g limits: +5.33 -2.13 at 220 km/h (136.7 mph; 118.8 kn)
- Maximum glide ratio: 27 at 85 km/h (52.8 mph; 45.9 kn)
- Rate of sink: 0.75 m/s (148 ft/min) at 78 km/h (48.5 mph; 42.1 kn)
- Wing loading: 26 kg/m^{2} (5.3 lb/sq ft)

== See also ==
Related lists

- List of gliders
