= Wassmer Squale =

French single seat glider, 1967

WA 26 Squale
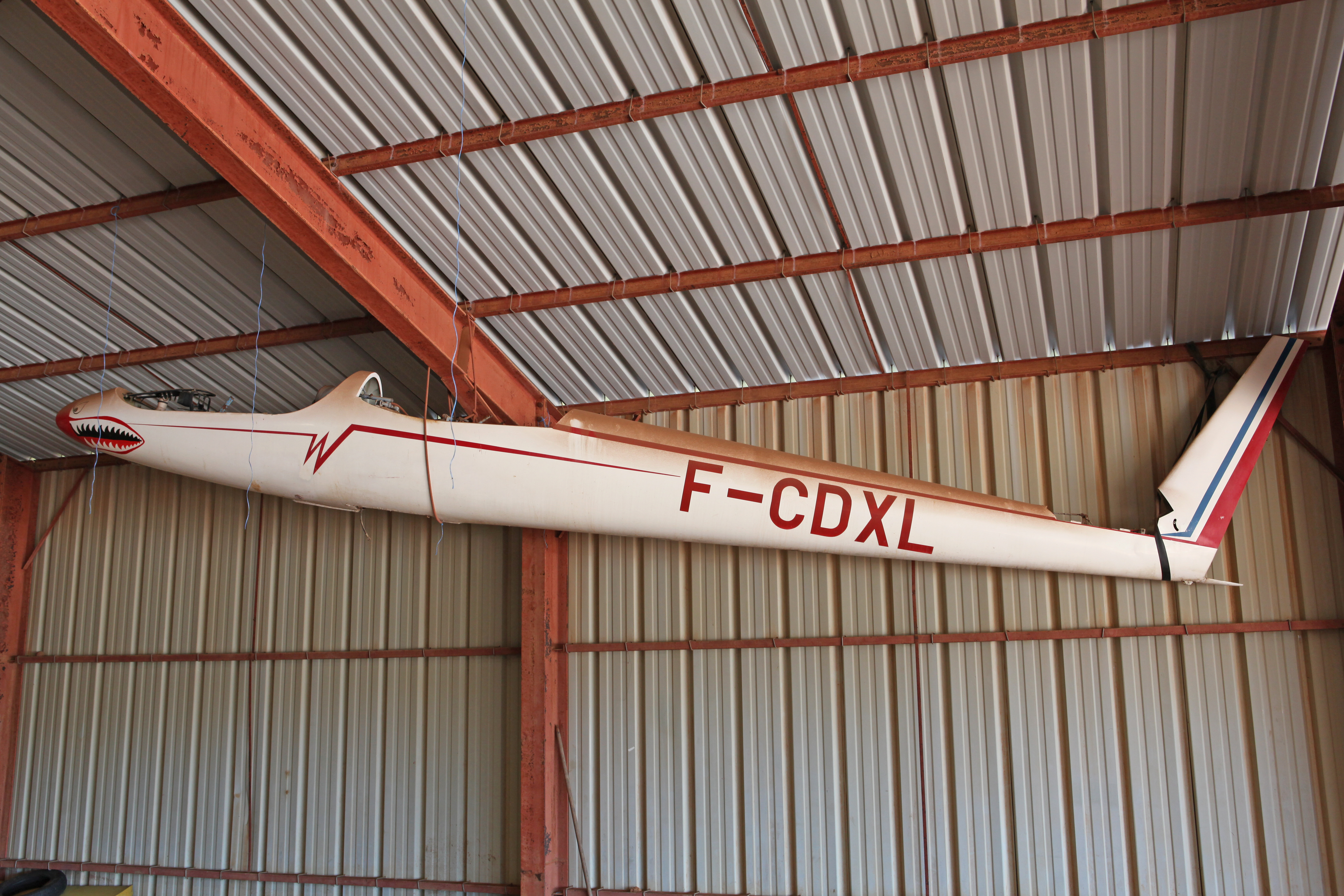
- Squale fuselage and fin

General information
- Type: Single seat high performance glider
- National origin: France
- Manufacturer: Wassmer Aviation
- Number built: 85 Squales and 20 Espadons ordered

History
- First flight: 21 July 1967

The Wassmer WA 26 Squale (English: Shark) is a single seat, 15 m (49 ft 3 in) span competition glider, designed and produced in France in the late 1960s. It has wooden wings and a glass fibre fuselage. The Wassmer WA 28 Espadon (English: Swordfish) is an aerodynamically very similar development with a glass fibre wing.

== Design and development ==
From 1956 until at least 1964 Wassmer built and developed the successful Javelot series of single seat gliders. These had wooden wings with NACA laminar flow profiles and steel framed fuselages, covered entirely with fabric on early models but later with a mixture of fabric and glass fiber. The Squale was attempt to break into the high performance market. Like the Javelots, it had a wooden wing but one with a Wortmann profile; its fuselage was a more aerodynamically refined and wholly GRP structure.

The straight edged high wing of the Squale has a slightly tapered centre section of about 60% of the span and more strongly tapered outer panels. There is constant dihedral across the whole span. The ailerons are on the outer panels, with airbrakes on the trailing edges of the outer centre section. The wing is built around a single wooden spar, with wooden ribs and 2.3 mm (0.1 in) plywood skin.

The straight tapered, all moving tail of the Squale is also wooden, with a ply covered leading edge and fabric covering aft. It is shoulder mounted on the fuselage. The early Squales lacked elevator feel, so anti-balance tabs were added on the WA 26M version. The straight edged, swept fin and rudder, the latter horn balanced, are GRP structures, integral with the fuselage. This has an oval section which gradually increases in diameter forwards to the wings. There is a retractable monowheel undercarriage, fitted with an hydraulic brake and assisted by a small, fixed tailskid. The pilot's semi-reclining position is under a long, single piece canopy which hinges to port.

The Squale sold quite well; after its first flight on 21 July 1967, production began the following year and by January 1970, 85 had been ordered.

Recognition that wooden-winged gliders were becoming outdated resulted in a redesigned wing, aerodynamically the same as the WA 26 Squale but built of GRP and fitted with Schempp-Hirth rather than trailing edge airbrakes. This led to the WA 28 Espadon, the new wing mounted on a Squale fuselage with a GRP all moving tail in place of the Squale's wooden one. The Espadon is 20–25 kg (44-55 lb) heavier than the Squale; its best glide ratio is 1:36 at 88 km/h (55 mph). It first flew in May 1974 and went into production that November; by the Spring of 1975, 20 were on order. It soon became apparent that competitors like the Schleicher ASW 15 had significantly better performance and production did not continue for long.

== Operational history ==
Several Squales and Espadons remain on the French and UK civil aircraft registers in 2010. In all there are thirty Squales, though two are dismantled or stored, and fourteen Espadons.

== Variants ==
WA 26 Squale
Initial version.
WA 26M Squale
Anti-balance tabs added to all-moving elevator.
WA 26 CM Squale
No anti-balance tab.
WA 26 CM Squale Marfa
WA 26 P Squale
WA 28 Espadon
First flew May 1974. All GRP; Schempp-Hirth airbrakes.

== Specifications (WA 26 Squale) ==
3-view line drawing of the Wassmer WA-26

Data from Sailplanes 1965-2000

General characteristics

- Crew: 1
- Length: 7.65 m (25 ft 1 in)
- Wingspan: 15.0 m (49 ft 3 in)
- Wing area: 12.6 m^{2} (136 sq ft)
- Aspect ratio: 12.6
- Empty weight: 228 kg (503 lb)
- Gross weight: 353 kg (778 lb)

Performance

- Wing loading: 28 kg/m^{2} (5.7 lb/sq ft)
