= Groshev GN-4 =

General information
- Type: Glider
- Role: Transport glider
- National origin: USSR
- Manufacturer: Moscow Glider Works
- Designer: G.F. Groshev
- Built by: Moscow Glider Works

History
- Introduction date: 1934

The Groshev GN-4 was a Soviet transport glider introduced in 1934.

Designed by G. F. Groshev and built by the Moscow Glider Works, the GN-4 was the world's first transport glider, with capacity for 5 passengers. Unlike later transport gliders, which would be towed near to the destination then released to glide on their own, the GN-4 was designed to be towed almost the entire flight except for a short while after release from the tow-plane for landing, though it is claimed that it could fly like a sailplane under the right conditions. The GN-4 was intended to be towed as part of a glider train behind a commercial version of the Polikarpov R-5. The GN-4's design consists of a narrow oval fuselage mated to a high-wing, strut-braced wing with an enclosed cockpit and 5 passenger seats.

== Specifications ==
- Crew: 1
- Passengers: 5
- Wingspan: 60 ft
- Fuselage length: 27 ft
- Empty weight: 1,000 lb
- Loaded weight: 1,992 lb
- Maximum towing speed: 100 mph
