= Warsztaty Szybowcowe SG-21 Lwów =

SG-21 Lwów
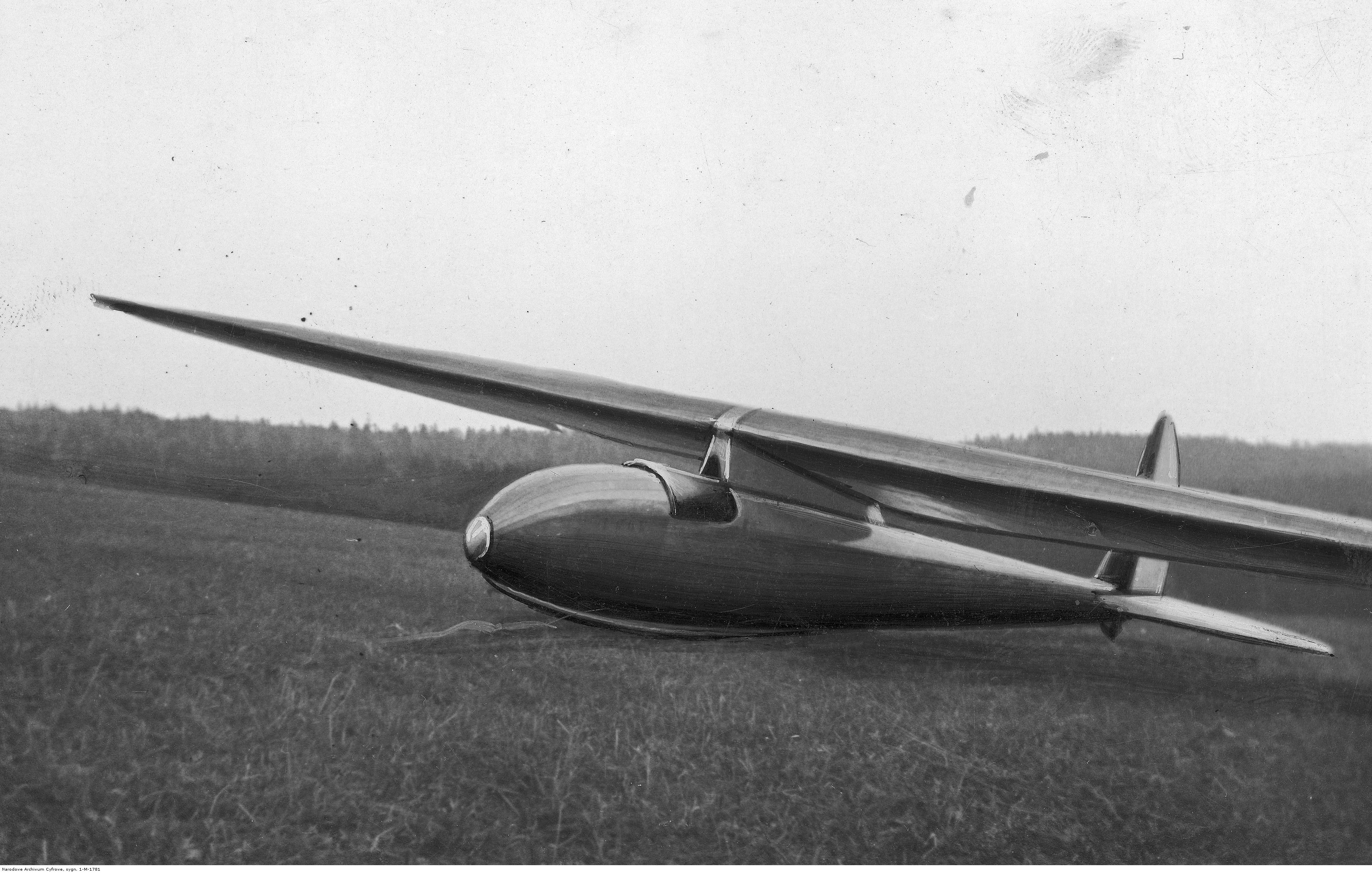
- SG-21 Lwów in 1932

General information
- Type: high performance competition sailplane
- National origin: Poland
- Manufacturer: D.W.L., a Warsztaty Szybowcowe associate
- Designer: Szczepan Grzesczyk
- Number built: 1 SG-21, 1 SG-28

History
- First flight: 16 October 1931

The D.W.L. SG-21 Lwów was a Polish high performance sailplane built for the Polish government. Though both it and a development, the SG-28, were one-offs, they set several national records and led to the batch-produced Warsztaty Szybowcowe SG-3.

== Design and development ==
Along with the Czerwiński CW 5 bis the Lwów was he result of a Ministry of Transport call for a high performance competition sailplane. It was designed by Szczepan Grzesczyk and its construction by DWL at Okęcie began in July 1931. The Lwów made its first flight, piloted by Grzesczyk, on 16 October 1931, well before its rival.

It was an all-wood, single-seat, high wing aircraft. Its wing was in two parts, rectangular in span inboard but trapezoidal over most of the span. Each part was built around a single spar with plywood covering from it forwards around the leading edge forming a torsion-resistant D-box. Behind the spar the wings were fabric-covered. They were connected together centrally on a streamlined fuselage pylon. The ailerons, also fabric-covered, operated differentially.

The Lwów's fuselage was a semi-monococque ply shell of oval cross-section with its open cockpit was ahead of the wing-pylon. Aft of the pylon the fuselage became slimmer back to a tall, ply-covered fin, integral with the fuselage and carrying broad, mostly fabric-covered balanced rudder. There was no tailplane as the narrow, tapered elevator was of the all-flying type. It was mounted on top of the fuselage and forward of the rudder.

Landing gear was a rubber-sprung skid and small tailskid.

Though only one SG-21 was built its distinguished career, described below, prompted a development, the SG-28, built by P.Z.L. The chief improvements were in the wing, with a span increased to 17.6 m (57 ft 9 in), a higher aspect ratio of 17.6 and an aerofoil section which varied over the span. The fuselage was cleaned up, the cockpit provided with a detachable enclosure, initially ply-framed then a tubular structure with windows, and pneumatic shock-absorbers replaced the rubber springs of the landing skid. As a result of these changes the SG-28 had an improved glide ratio (22.5) and lower sink rate 0.61 m/s (120 ft/min)).

== Operational history ==
On the day after its first flight on 16 October 1931, the SG-21 made the first cross-country towed flight in Poland, leaving Okęcie to reach Bezmiechowa, a well-known glider centre 507 km (315 mi; 274 nmi) away. Grzeszczyk piloted the glider behind a RWD 4 flown by Drezwwiecki. On 19 October Grzeszczyk set a new Polish national endurance record of 7 h 52 m 45 s. A number of other national records were set in the next three years: on 7 August 1932 Bolesław Łopatniuk made the first true cross-country flight in Poland, setting a new distance record of 17.3 km (10.7 mi), and on 1 September 1934 Michał Offierski greatly extended this to 210 km (130 mi; 110 nmi) and set a new altitude record at 2,256 m (7,402 ft) on the same flight. On 5 October 1934 Masria Younga set a record altitude for women at 77 m (253 ft).

The SG-21 also took part in the February 1933 First Course of Towing Flights.

The SG-28 was flight tested in the summer of 1932. Its outstanding flight was made the following year when on 21 June Bolesław Baranowski set two national records on one flight which lasted for 10 h 40 m and reached 1,270 m (4,170 ft), though this altitude was surpassed by Offierski's later flight.

The two gliders flew on into the mid-1930s. Though only one of each type was built, they provided Grzeszczyk with experience that was incorporated into the design of the batch-built Warsztaty Szybowcowe SG-3 which became Poland's most popular and successful high performance sailplane in the mid-1930s.

== Variants ==
SG-21 Lwów
One only, as described

SG-28
Revised design with new, longer span wing of varying section and aerodynamically cleaned-up fuselage with enclosed cockpit. One only.

== Specifications (SG-21) ==
Data from Samoloty: SG-21 "Lwów", 1931 (SG-1), Polish Aircraft 1893-1939

General characteristics

- Crew: One
- Length: 7 m (23 ft 0 in)
- Wingspan: 16.41 m (53 ft 10 in)
- Height: 1.8 m (5 ft 11 in)
- Wing area: 17.55 m^{2} (188.9 sq ft)
- Aspect ratio: 15.3
- Airfoil: Warsaw Aeronautical Institute no.100
- Empty weight: 128 kg (282 lb)
- Gross weight: 203 kg (448 lb)

Performance

- Maximum glide ratio: 21 at 55 km/h (34 mph; 30 kn)
- Rate of sink: 0.7 m/s (140 ft/min) minimum at 53 km/h (33 mph; 29 kn)
- Minimum speed: 49 km/h (30 mph; 26 kn)
