= Warsztaty Szybowcowe SG-3 =

Grzeszczyk SG-3
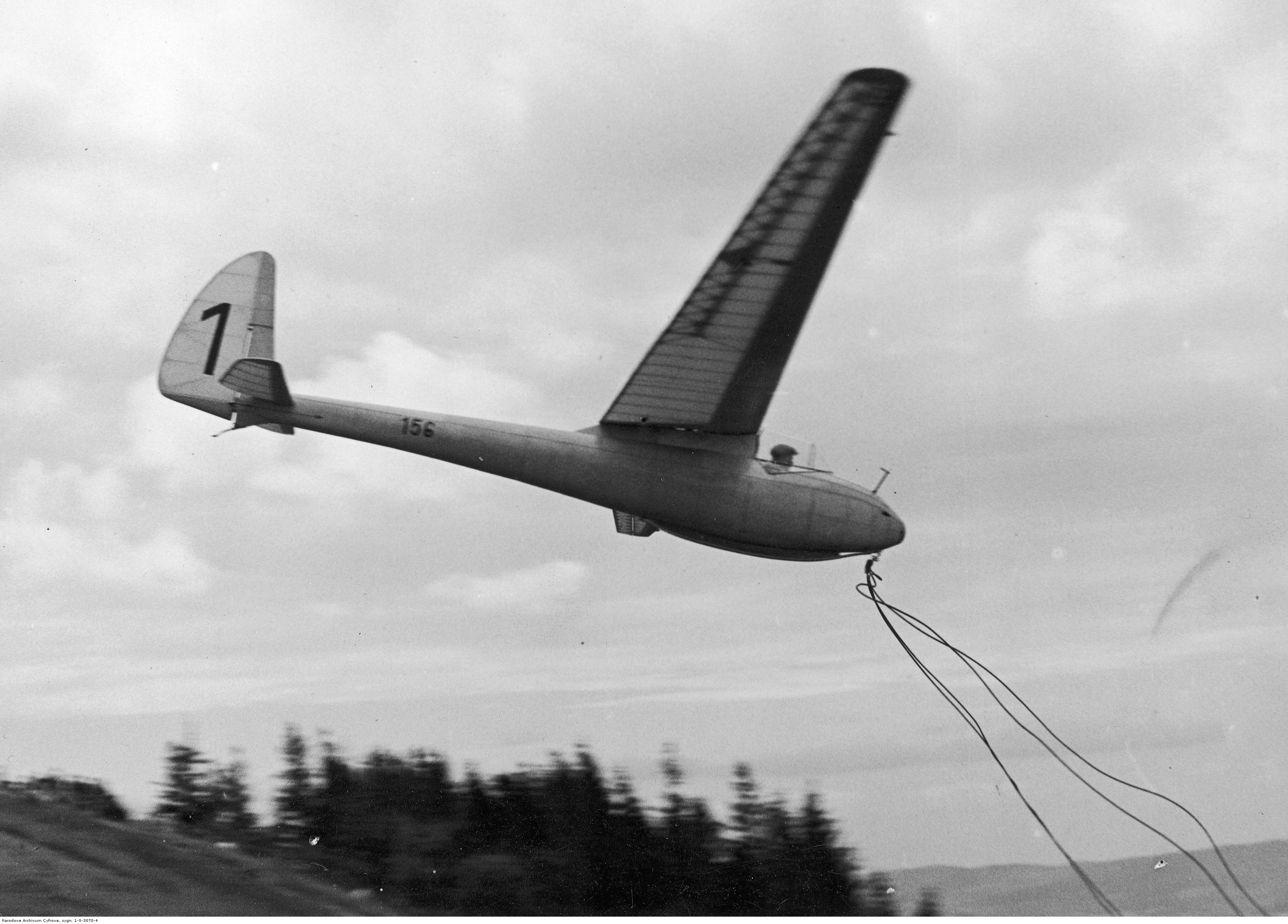

General information
- Type: High performance glider
- National origin: Poland
- Manufacturer: Warsztaty Szybowcowe
- Designer: Szezepan Grzeszczyk
- Number built: c.25 including SG-3 and SG-bis variants.

History
- Manufactured: 3 years
- First flight: July or August 1933
- Developed from: Grzeszczyk SG-21 Lwów and SG-28

The Grzeszczyk SG-3 was a Polish single-seat, high performance sailplane first flown in 1933. Between 1934 and 1937 it was Poland's most successful competitor and record setter; about twenty-five were completed.

== Design and development ==
In 1931-2 Szczepan Grzesczyk designed the Grzeszczyk SG-21 Lwów and SG-28, two high performance sailplanes. Although only one of each was built, they performed well and led to the batch-built Grzeszczyk SG-3. Design was initiated in 1932 and Warsztaty Szybowcowe began construction of three developmental airframes in March 1933. The first flew in July or August. Competing against the CW-5, the SG-3 established itself as the predominant Polish competition and record setting sailplane of its era.

It was an all-wood, single-seat, cantilever high wing aircraft. Its two part wing, mounted on a streamlined central pylon, was built around a single spar with angled drag struts near the fuselage. Plywood covering ran around the leading edge to the spar, forming a torsion resisting D-box, as well as forward of the drag strut. Fabric covered the rest of the wing. SG-3 and SG-3bis wings were similarly built but plans and dihedrals differed. The SG-3 had a rectangular plan centre section filling about 15% of the span, with trapezoidal panels outboard. The SG-3bis had a gull wing of constant taper but with higher dihedral over the inner 30% of the, a 600 mm (23.6 in) greater span and a 6% increase in aspect ratio. They also differed in section: the SG-3 used Warsaw Aerodynamic Institute airfoils but the SG-38bis used the Göttingen 549. The ailerons also differed, with split surfaces on the SG-3 but longer, narrower single surfaces on the SG-3bis.

The fuselage was a ply-skinned semi-monocoque, tapering rearwards most rapidly on the SG=3bis. The enclosed cockpit was ahead of the wing pylon and the wing leading edge and was continuously refined over the three annual production batches (SG-3/34, SG-3/35 and SG-36bis/36). The empennage was similar to that of the SG-21 Lwów and SG-28 with a very narrow, ply-covered fin integral with the fuselage and full, fabric-covered rudder. The rudder balance of early versions had gone by 1936. The chord of the split, tapered and mostly fabric-covered all moving tailplane of the SG-3 was increased in the SG-3bis.

It landed n a sprung, central skid, faired-in on the SG-3bis, and had a small tailskid.

== Operational history ==
The SG-3 and SG-3bis set many Polish records. These included duration records in 1933 and 1934, the latter lasting 12 h 60 min. In 1936 it set the altitude record at 3,435 m (11,270 ft) and a distance record of 332.3 km (206.5 mi; 179.4 nmi). In 1937 it took the out-and-return distance record to 62.2 km (38.6 mi; 33.6 nmi) and in the following year Wanda Modlibowska set a women's distance record at 343 km (213 mi; 185 nmi).

Twelve competed in the Fourth National Glider Contest, held at Ustianowa in July 1936. Six were SG-3bis and these dominated the competition. One flown Z. Źabski was the overall winner. A SG-3bis, flown by Tadeusz Góra, won the 1937 Contest. By 1938 other designs, like the PWS-101 were starting to out-perform the SG-3bis, which also needed strengthening to meet new cloud-flying regulations. According to Cynk this prevented their participation in the Sixth Contest, though a contract to make the required modifications was agreed. Simons states that this work was judged too costly and most were scrapped, though Samoloty reports that five took part.

== Variants ==
SG-3
Initial version, first flown in 1933 and produced in batches in 1934 and 1935 with improvements to the cockpit enclosure increasing the field of view.

SG-3bis
Gull-winged, longer span version flown in 1936. It also had minor fuselage and empennage improvements. The optimum glide ratio was increased to 1:25.

== Specifications (SG-3) ==
Data from Samoloty

General characteristics

- Crew: One
- Length: 7.05 m (23 ft 2 in)
- Wingspan: 17.0 m (55 ft 9 in)
- Height: 1.85 m (6 ft 1 in)
- Wing area: 16.5 m^{2} (178 sq ft)
- Aspect ratio: 17.5
- Airfoil: Warsaw Aerodynamic Institute 192 and 336
- Empty weight: 149 kg (328 lb)
- Gross weight: 226 kg (498 lb)

Performance

- Maximum glide ratio: 22.7 best at 58 km/h (36 mph; 31 kn)
- Rate of sink: 0.65 m/s (128 ft/min) minimum at 53 km/h (33 mph; 29 kn)
- Minimum speed: 48 km/h (30 mph; 26 kn)
