= Wiederkehr GHW-1 Cu-Climber =

American glider

GHW-1 Cu-Climber

General information
- Type: Glider
- National origin: United States
- Designer: George H. Wiederkehr
- Status: Sole example still flying
- Number built: One

History
- Introduction date: 1968
- First flight: 1968

The Wiederkehr GHW-1 Cu-Climber is an American, high-wing, single-seat glider that was designed by George H. Wiederkehr and first flown in 1968.

== Design and development ==
The Cu-Climber is an original design and is of mixed construction, with the fuselage of fibreglass with foam bulkheads, forming a semi-monocoque structure. The wings are a fiberglass and balsa sandwich, with fibreglass skin, except aft of the spar on the under-surface where aircraft fabric covering is employed. The wing also features a large 12 inch (30 cm) X 6 inch (15 cm) box spar that is made from spruce, plywood and fiberglass, which is stressed to +9.6/-6.3 g. The wing employs a Pfenninger 14% airfoil.

The control surfaces include an all flying tail fitted with an anti-servo tab and full-span ailerons of very short chord that act as flaps when drooped for glidepath control. The landing gear is a fixed monowheel that is faired to reduce drag.

The aircraft's designation of GHW-1 indicates the designer's initials. Unusually the aircraft is registered with the Federal Aviation Administration simply as Amateur Built 68 glider. Only one example was ever constructed.

== Operational history ==
In 1983 Soaring Magazine reported that the GHW-1 was being regularly flown and that the designer was constructing a new GHW-2. In May 2011 the GHW-1 was still registered to Wiederkehr. The GHW-2 was completed and in May 2011 was owned by Anthony C. Wiederkehr.

== Specifications (GHW-1) ==
Data from Sailplane Directory and Soaring

General characteristics

- Crew: One
- Wingspan: 47 ft 7 in (14.50 m)
- Wing area: 127 sq ft (11.8 m^{2})
- Airfoil: Pfenninger 14%
- Empty weight: 480 lb (218 kg)
- Gross weight: 700 lb (318 kg)

Performance

- Maximum glide ratio: 28 to 32:1 (estimated) at 55-60 mph (89-97 km/h)
- Rate of sink: 126 ft/min (0.64 m/s) to 150 fpm (0.76 m/s) (estimated) at 44-50 mph (71-80 km/h)
- Wing loading: 5.5 lb/sq ft (27 kg/m^{2})

== See also ==
Related lists

- List of gliders
