= Gehrlein Precursor =

American glider

Precursor

General information
- Type: Glider
- National origin: United States
- Designer: Larry Gehrlein
- Number built: One

History
- Introduction date: 1965
- First flight: 1965
- Developed from: Schweizer 1-26 and 1-23

The Gehrlein Precursor is an American, high-wing, single seat glider designed by Larry Gehrlein in 1965 and assembled from Schweizer Aircraft parts.

== Design and development ==
There was just one Schweizer 1-23C built and it was owned and modified by Gehrlein. The aircraft was crashed and rebuilt with new 1-23D wings. The 1-23C's damaged wings were rebuilt and formed the basis for the Precursor. The fuselage for the Precursor started life as a 1963 model Schweizer 1-26A. The two components were reworked by Gehrlein and his two sons, Rod and Jay, in 1965. They took the 1-26A fuselage and mounted the wings from the Schweizer 1-23C, modifying the fuselage, which had mounted the original 1-26 wings in the mid position to accept the 1-23C wings in the high position. The resulting aircraft is registered with the Federal Aviation Administration in the Experimental - Racing - Amateur Built - Exhibition category.

The Precursor is of all-metal construction and features a fixed monowheel landing gear, with a small tail caster. Only one Precursor was built.

== Operational history ==
PIlot reports indicate that the Precursor climbs well in thermals and exhibits stable handling.

Gehrlein eventually sold the one-of-a-kind design to Les Stoner of Houston, Texas and today it is owned by Gehrlein's son, Rod, and based in Erie, Pennsylvania.

== Specifications (Precursor) ==
Data from Soaring

General characteristics

- Crew: one
- Wingspan: 53 ft 6 in (16.31 m)
- Wing area: 165 sq ft (15.3 m^{2})
- Aspect ratio: 17:1
- Airfoil: NACA 43012A and 23009
- Empty weight: 525 lb (238 kg)
- Gross weight: 775 lb (352 kg)

Performance

- Maximum glide ratio: 32:1 at 46 mph (74 km/h)
- Rate of sink: 117 ft/min (0.59 m/s) at 40 mph (64 km/h)
- Wing loading: 4.7 lb/sq ft (23 kg/m^{2})

== See also ==
Aircraft of comparable role, configuration, and era

- Gehrlein GP-1

Related lists

- List of gliders
