= Windward Performance SparrowHawk =

SparrowHawk
- Three view drawing

General information
- Type: Glider
- National origin: United States
- Manufacturer: Windward Performance
- Status: Out of Production
- Number built: 35

History
- First flight: 2002

The Windward Performance SparrowHawk is an American mid-wing, single-seat glider that was designed and produced by Windward Performance. It first flew in 2002.

Since 2016 the aircraft has been no longer advertised as available by the manufacturer.

== Design and development ==
The SparrowHawk was designed to fit into the US FAR 103 Ultralight Vehicles category, including that category's requirement that unpowered aircraft have a maximum empty weight of 155 lb (70 kg). The sailplane achieves this by utilizing a structure that is predominantly made from carbon-fiber-reinforced polymer.

The SparrowHawk's multi-tapered, 36.1 ft (11.0 m) span wing employs five different airfoils and has an aspect ratio of 18.6:1. The wing features Schempp-Hirth style spoilers on the top surface. The cockpit can accommodate pilots who range in height from 63 to 75 in (160 to 191 cm). The landing gear is a fixed monowheel gear with an auxiliary tail wheel. The glider is finished with a two part polyurethane paint. The aircraft can be launched by auto-tow, winch-launch, or aero-tow by both light aircraft and ultralight aircraft. Aerobatics are not recommended.

The SparrowHawk achieves a best glide ratio of 36:1 and a minimum sink rate of 119 ft/min (0.60 m/s).

== Specifications (SparrowHawk) ==
Data from Bertrand and company website

General characteristics

- Crew: one
- Length: 20.6 ft (6.3 m)
- Wingspan: 36.1 ft (11.0 m)
- Height: 4.5 ft (1.4 m)
- Wing area: 70 sq ft (6.5 m^{2})
- Aspect ratio: 18.6:1
- Empty weight: 155 lb (70 kg)
- Gross weight: 415 lb (188 kg)

Performance

- Stall speed: 32 kn (37 mph, 59 km/h)
- Never exceed speed: 123 kn (142 mph, 228 km/h)
- g limits: +5.48/-4.0g
- Maximum glide ratio: 36:1 at 50 kn (58 mph; 93 km/h)
- Rate of sink: 119 ft/min (0.60 m/s) at 38 kn (44 mph; 70 km/h)
- Wing loading: 5.93 lb/sq ft (29.0 kg/m^{2})

== See also ==
Related lists

- List of gliders
