= Gehrlein GP-1 =

American glider

GP-1

General information
- Type: Glider
- National origin: United States
- Designer: Jay and Rod Gehrlein
- Status: Kits no longer available
- Number built: At least five

History
- First flight: July 1968

The Gehrlein GP-1 is an American mid-wing, single seat FAI Standard Class glider that was designed by Jay and Rod Gehrlein and first flown in July 1968.

== Design and development ==
When their father, glider pilot Larry Gehrlein was on an extended vacation, his two sons, Rod and Jay decided to design and build a new glider as a surprise for his return. The resulting GP-1 was designed and built in under a year, between the summer of 1968 and the summer of 1969.

Unlike Larry Gehrlein's earlier Gehrlein Precursor, the GP-1 is an original design and uses no Schweizer Aircraft parts in its construction.

The GP-1 is an all-metal aircraft, with a 15 m (49.2 ft) wingspan. The wing is of a constant 30 in (76 cm) chord and employs a Wortmann FX-61-184 airfoil. Glide path control is via a set of scissor-type spoilers and air brakes. The design was intended to be simple to construct. Kits were at one time offered for sale with at least five aircraft being completed.

== Operational history ==
In May 2011 there were still four GP-1s on the Federal Aviation Administration registry.

== Specifications (GP-1) ==
Data from Sailplane Directory and Soaring

General characteristics

- Crew: One
- Wingspan: 49 ft 3 in (15 m)
- Wing area: 120 sq ft (11 m^{2})
- Aspect ratio: 20:1
- Airfoil: Wortmann FX-61-184
- Empty weight: 458 lb (208 kg)
- Gross weight: 662 lb (300 kg)

Performance

- Maximum glide ratio: 35:1 at 60 mph (97 km/h)
- Rate of sink: 120 ft/min (0.61 m/s) at 50 mph (80 km/h)
- Wing loading: 5.5 lb/sq ft (27 kg/m^{2})

== See also ==
Related lists

- List of gliders
