= Whigham GW-7 =

American glider

GW-7

General information
- Type: Glider
- National origin: United States
- Designer: Gene Whigham
- Status: No longer in production
- Number built: one

History
- First flight: 1987

The Whigham GW-7 is an American mid-wing, single-seat, 15 metre class glider that was designed and constructed by Gene Whigham, a retired Convair flight test engineer.

== Design and development ==
Whigham's last glider design was the GW-7. The aircraft was completed and first flew in 1987.

The GW-7 is of all metal construction, has a 15 m (49.2 ft) wing span and employs a NASA NLF(1)-0215F airfoil. The flaps and ailerons are interconnected. The flaps travel +/-10° in normal flight in concert with the ailerons and then can be deployed to 60° for glidepath control on landing.

Only one GW-7 was constructed and it was registered with the Federal Aviation Administration as an Experimental - Amateur-built.

== Operational history ==
In July 2011 the sole GW-7 built was still on the FAA registry and owned by Donald Macey of Fallon, Nevada.

== Specifications (GW-7) ==
Data from Sailplane Directory

General characteristics

- Crew: one
- Wingspan: 49 ft 3 in (15.0 m)
- Wing area: 92 sq ft (8.5 m^{2})
- Aspect ratio: 27:1
- Airfoil: NASA NLF(1)-0215F
- Empty weight: 333 lb (151 kg)
- Gross weight: 532 lb (241 kg)

Performance

- Maximum glide ratio: 39:1 at 48 mph (77 km/h)
- Rate of sink: 110 ft/min (0.56 m/s)
- Wing loading: 5.78 lb/sq ft (28.2 kg/m^{2})

== See also ==
Related lists

- List of gliders
