= Czerwiński CW 5 bis =

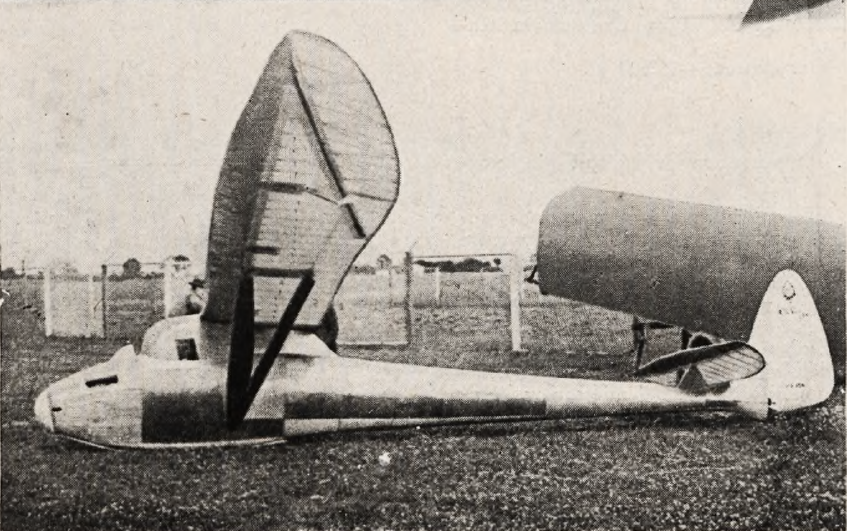

General information
- Type: high performance sailplane
- National origin: Poland
- Manufacturer: ZASPL
- Designer: Wacaw Czerwiński
- Number built: c.20

History
- First flight: 1932

The Czerwiński CW 5bis was a Polish high performance sailplane, produced and developed between 1933 and 1935. It set several national records, competed at both national and international level and remained a Polish gliding club mainstay until the outbreak of World War II.

== Design and development ==
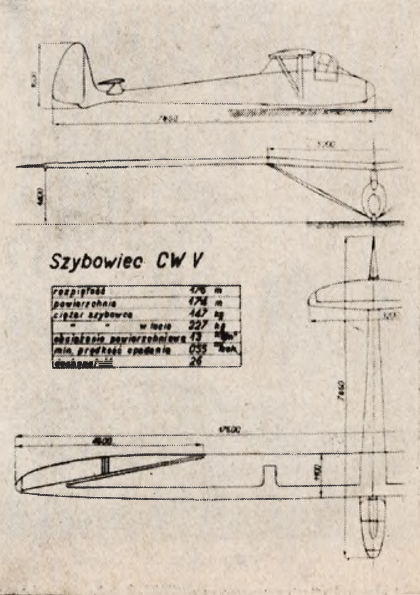
CW 5 bis

ZASPL, the Aviation Association of students of the Lwów Technical University, was the oldest aviation organization in Poland. Revived after World War I, by 1926 it had workshops in Lwów which began building the glider designs of ZASPL member Wacław Czerwiński. The 1931 CW 5 was his response to a call from the government for a high performance glider. His earliest draft, the CW 5, specified the Gôttingen Gô 652 airfoil that Alexander Lippisch had used on the RRG Fafnir, despite the lack of full information on its characteristics at the time, and wind tunnel tests proved very disappointing. The CW 5.bis design that followed used a thinner and lower camber airfoil from the Warsaw Aerodynamic Institute. Wind tunnel results for it were much closer to expectations and the CW 5.bis was completed in the ZASPL workshops in 1932.

The Cw 5.bis had a single spar, high mounted gull wing with an aspect ratio of 18, very high for the 1930s. It was covered with plywood ahead of the spar, forming a D-box, and with fabric behind. Only the inner part, about a quarter of the span, carried dihedral. Out to half span the wing had a rectangular plan but beyond this long, curved ailerons, mounted at an angle to the centre-line, narrowed the chord to fine tips. The wing was braced by V-struts from the lower fuselage to the spar and false spar of the central section.

Its pilot sat ahead of the leading edge; the prototype had an open cockpit but in the production models it was enclosed with multi-panel glazing. The fuselage was a semi-monocoque structure which became progressively more slender aft of the wing and had a sprung landing skid mounted below the forward part. The CW 5.bis's elevator was its most unconventional feature. Semi-elliptical in plan and with a ply covered leading edge and fabric elsewhere, it was mounted on a short, streamlined V-strut clear and ahead of the integral, ply covered fin. The latter was narrow and ply covered and carried a curved, fabric covered rudder. There was a short tailskid under the fin.

There is some uncertainty about the year of the first light, but according to Cynk this occurred in the summer of 1932. After successful flight trials a short production run of the CW 5.bis/33 followed. The first air-towed launch was in May 1933. 1934 saw an improved version, the CW 5.bis/34. A final version, the CW 5.bis/35, had an aerodynamically cleaner, deeper and strengthened fuselage. About ten of this version were produced. The final airframe count over all models was about twenty.

In 1936 Michal Blaicher produced a markedly different derivative of the CW 5.bis/35. It was constructed in the workshops of the W.O.S. (Military Gliding Camp) at Ustjanowa Górna and first flew in 1937, appearing in public in August of that year at the Fifth National Glider Contest. Named the WOS-37 Splett, it used a different airfoil, a different wing plan and shorter wing struts, though the span was unchanged. The fuselage was about 6% shorter. Most noticeably, it had a tailplane, which was integral with the fin. Either one or two were built.

== Operational history ==
The CW 5/bis was widely used for advanced pilot training in Poland in the remaining pre-World War II period. Examples also took part in many national competitions and set a series of national records for altitude and distance. For example, on 4 October 1935 Żabski reached 2,540 m (8,330 ft). The same year Maria Younga set the women's altitude record at 2,235 m (7,333 ft). One CW 5.bis was flown by Żabski on the Wasserkuppe in the international Rhön contest of 1937, where it was placed eighth and helped Poland into second place.

== Variants ==
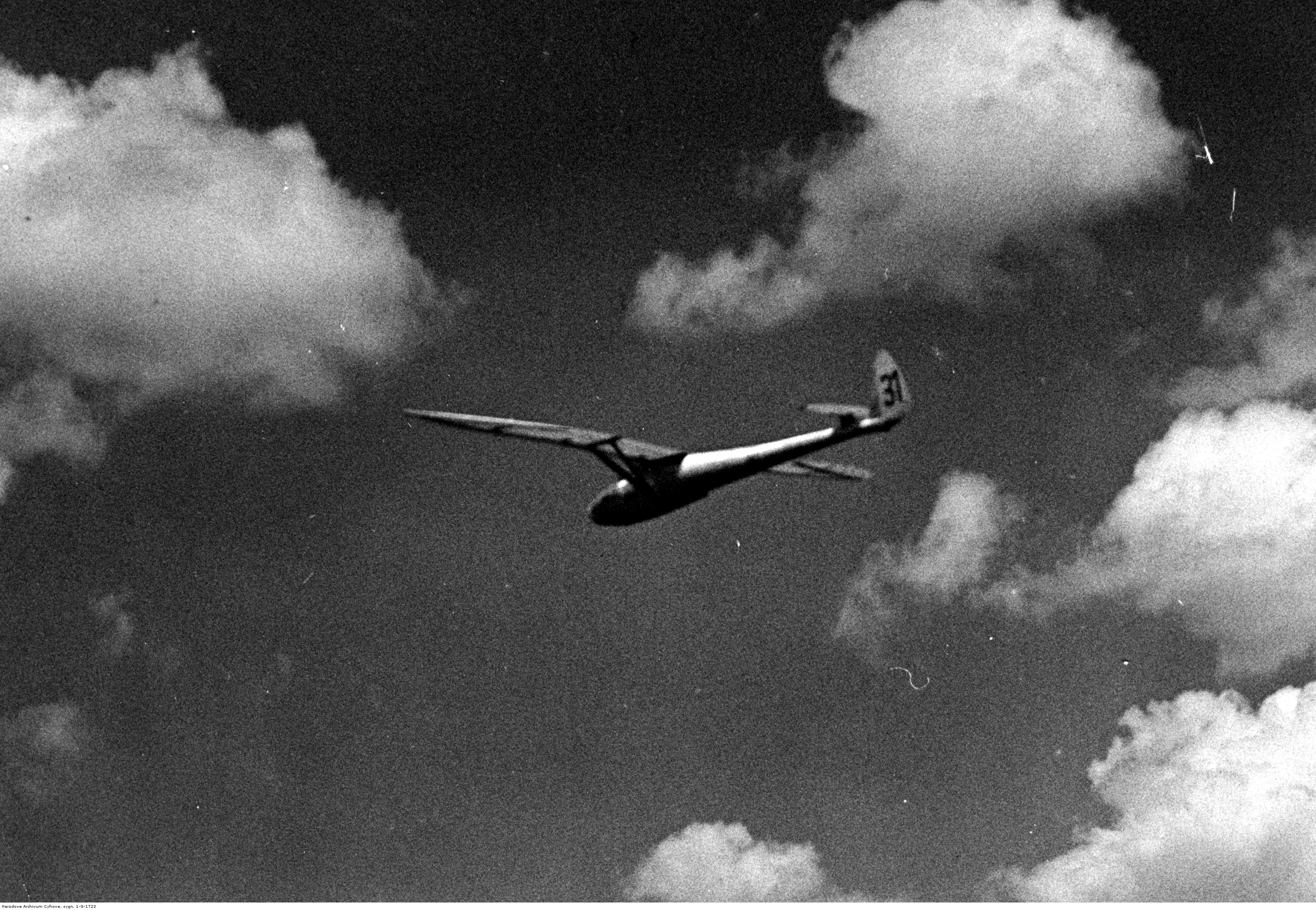
CW 5.bis/35 in flight

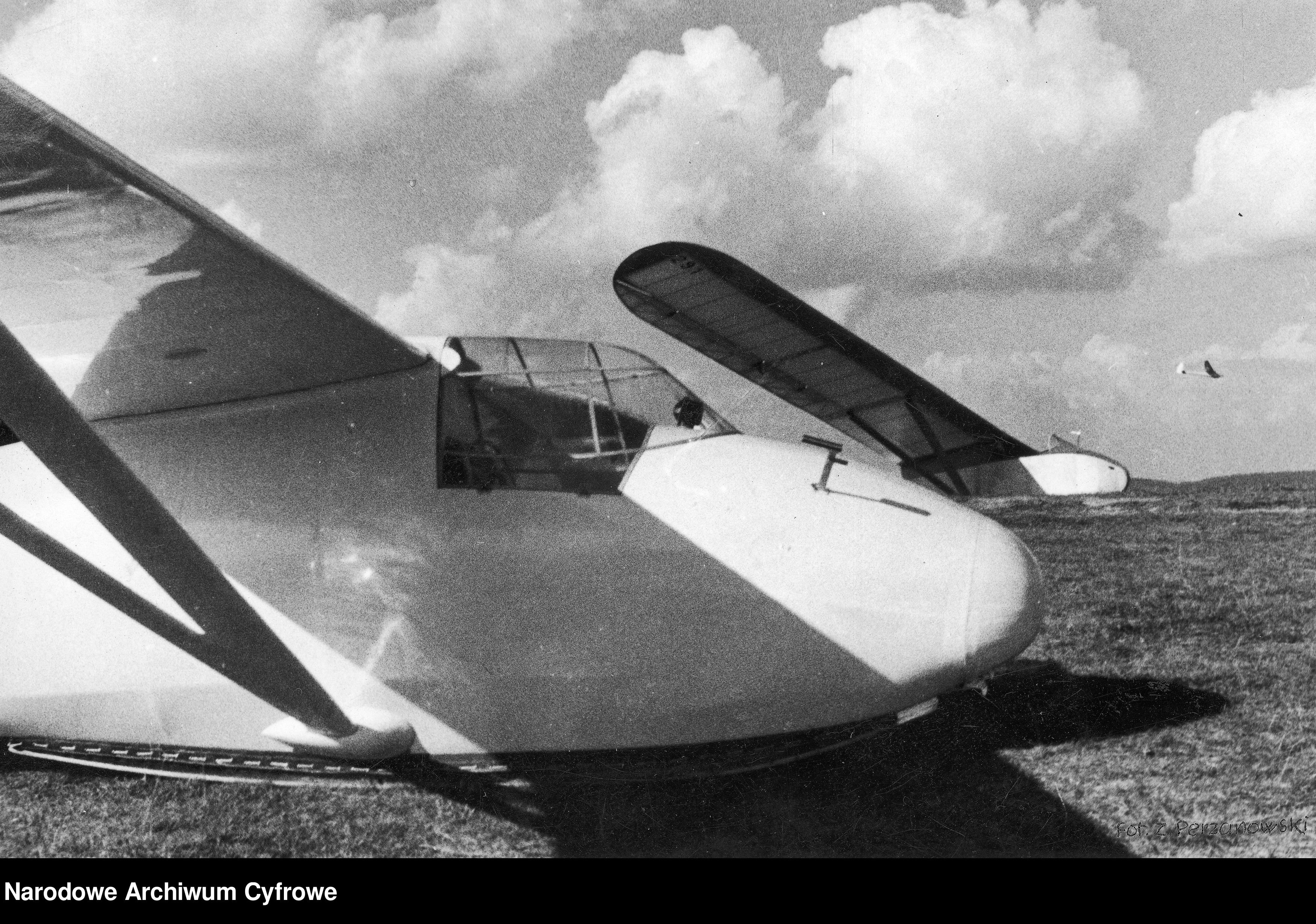
CW 5.bis/35

CW 5.bis
prototype, open cockpit.
CW 5.bis/33
1933 first production version with detachable cockpit cover.
CW 5.bis/34
1934 version with refinements.
CW 5.bis/35
1935 version with a deeper, strengthened and cleaned-up fuselage.
WOS-37 Splett
1937 derivative with different airfoil and wing shape, shorter wing struts and fuselage. Revised cockpit and new empennage, with a conventional tailplane integral with the fuselage and fin.

== Specifications (CW 5bis/34) ==
Data from J.Cynk, 1971 except where noted

General characteristics

- Crew: One
- Length: 7.86 m (25 ft 9 in)
- Wingspan: 17.8 m (58 ft 5 in)
- Height: 1.6 m (5 ft 3 in)
- Wing area: 17.4 m^{2} (187 sq ft)
- Aspect ratio: 18.2
- Airfoil: Warsaw Aerodynamic Institute 192
- Empty weight: 144 kg (317 lb)
- Gross weight: 224 kg (494 lb)

Performance

- Stall speed: 44 km/h (27 mph, 24 kn) minimum speed
- Maximum glide ratio: 21.5 best
- Rate of sink: 0.6 m/s (120 ft/min) minimum
- Towing speed: 148 km/h (92 mph; 80 kn)
