= Wassmer WA-40 =

WA-40
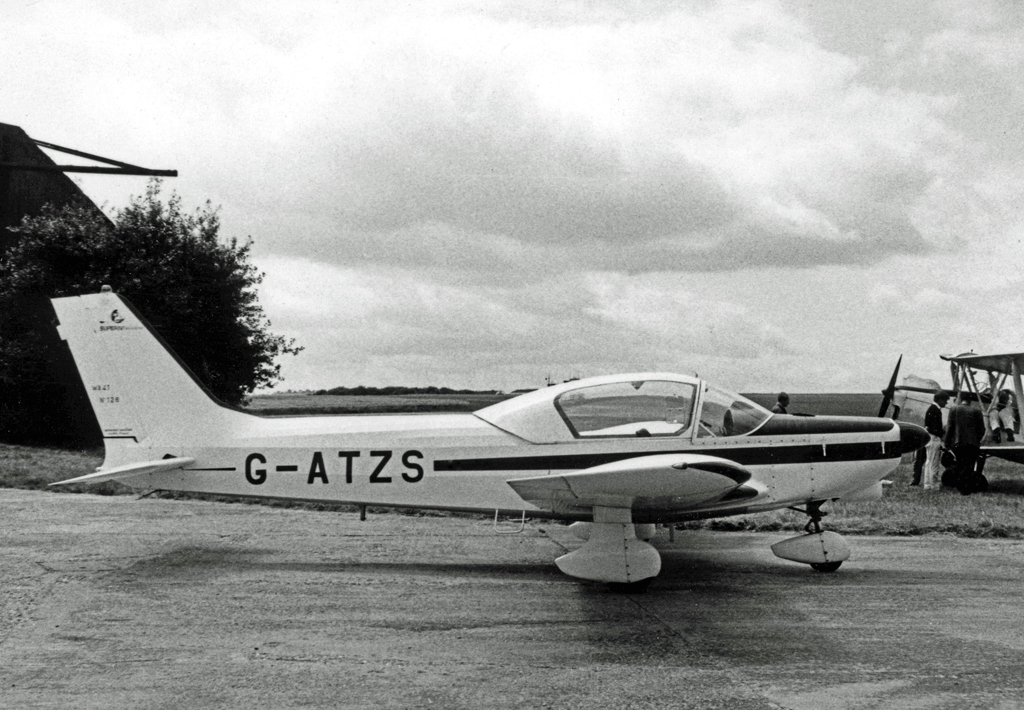
- Wassmer WA.41 Super Baladou at Thruxton Aerodrome Wiltshire in 1967

General information
- Type: Light Aircraft
- National origin: France
- Manufacturer: Wassmer

History
- Manufactured: 1961-1977
- First flight: 8 June 1959

The Wassmer WA-40 Super 4 Sancy is a French single-engined light aircraft of the 1960s and 70s. A single-engined low-winged monoplane with retractable nosewheel undercarriage, variants include the more powerful WA 4/21 Prestige and the WA-41 Baladou with a fixed undercarriage.

== Design and development ==
In 1955, Société Wassmer, which was formed in 1905 as an aircraft repair organisation, opened a design department, subsequently building over 300 Jodel aircraft under license before producing its first fully original aircraft, the WA-40 Super Sancy. This was a low-winged monoplane with a retractable nosewheel undercarriage. The fuselage was of steel tube construction with fabric covering, while the wings were of wooden construction. The first prototype flew on 8 June 1959, receiving French certification on 9 June 1960.

On the 53rd production aircraft (1963), a swept vertical fin and rudder were incorporated (designated WA.40A; first flying in January 1963 and receiving French certification in March 1963); all subsequent units produced continued the swept design.

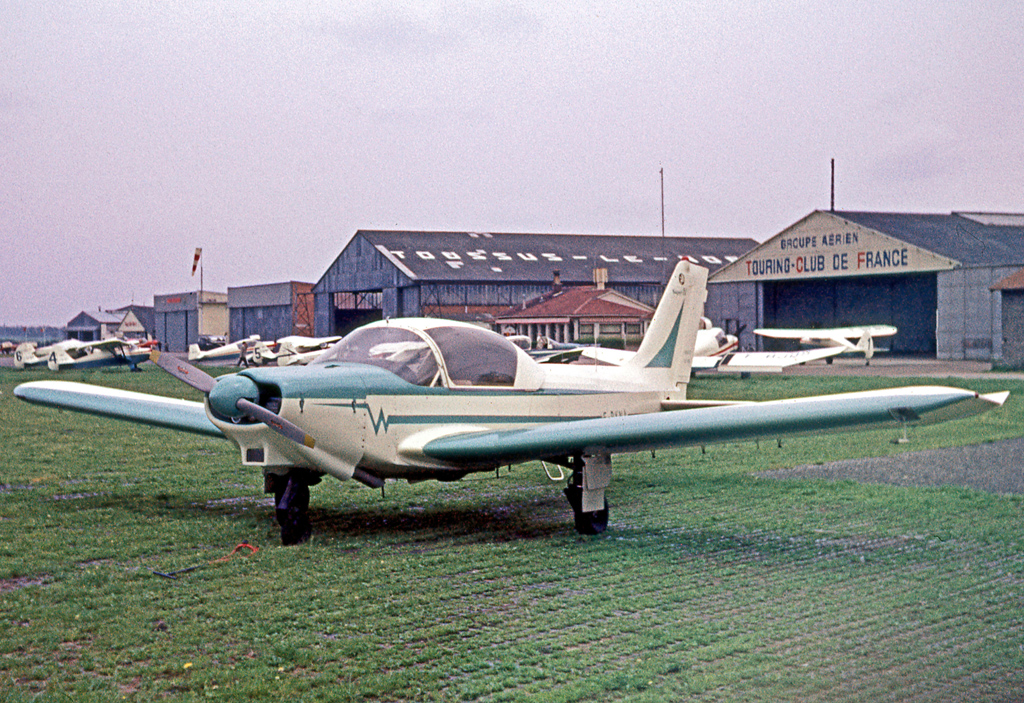
WA.40A Super IV in 1963 fitted with retractable undercarriage.

In 1965 the WA.41, with fixed landing gear was introduced, named Baladou. In March 1967 the Super 4/21 Prestige, powered by a 235 hp (175 kW) Lycoming O-540 engine. The 4/21 used a McCauley variable-pitch propeller, autopilot, electric flaps and IFR instrumentation.

An all-metal derivative design, the CE-43 Guépard (Cheetah) was produced by CERVA, a production company which Wassmer and Siren SA formed. It used the same engine as the Prestige (which by 1971 had been upgraded to a 250 hp Lycoming IO-540).

Wassmer suffered financial difficulty in 1977, and became insolvent in September 1977. By that time the Guépard offered an optional sixth seat, and designers were developing two further variants, the CE.44 Cougar and the CE.45 Léopard. However, due to the liquidation, those developments were not finalized, and no further aircraft were produced after September 1977.

== Variants ==
WA-40 Super IV
Original production. Powered by 180 hp Lycoming O-360-A1A engine. Upswept fin. Two prototypes + 50 production aircraft.
WA-40A Super IV
Revised production with swept fin. 180 WA-40 and WA40A built.
WA-41 Baladou
Simplified version with fixed undercarriage. 60 built by 1970.
WA 4/21 Prestige
More powerful version of the WA-40A with 250 hp Lycoming IO-540-C4B5 engine, electric flaps and landing gear, lengthened nose, the prototype was fitted with a 235 hp engine, 25 built by 1970.
WA-41-250
Alternate designation for the WA 4/21 production aircraft with a 250 hp engine.
CERVA CE-43 'Guépard'
derived from the WA4/21 the CE-43 was produced by CERVA
CERVA CE-44 'Couguar'
derived from CE-43 'Guépard'
CERVA CE-45 'Leopard'
derived from CE-43 'Guépard'

== Specifications (WA-40A) ==
3-view line drawing of the Wassmer WA-40

Data from Jane's All the World's Aircraft 1969–70

General characteristics

- Crew: 1
- Capacity: 3–4 passengers
- Length: 8.09 m (26 ft 7 in)
- Wingspan: 10.00 m (32 ft 10 in)
- Height: 2.86 m (9 ft 5 in) (over tail)
- Wing area: 16.0 m^{2} (172 sq ft)
- Aspect ratio: 6.2:1
- Airfoil: NACA 63.618
- Empty weight: 740 kg (1,631 lb)
- Max takeoff weight: 1,200 kg (2,646 lb)
- Fuel capacity: 220 L (48 imp gal; 58 US gal)
- Powerplant: 1 × Lycoming O-360-A1A 4-cylinder air cooled horizontally opposed, 130 kW (180 hp)
- Propellers: 2-bladed McCauley 2A36C14-78KM4 constant-speed propeller, 1.88 m (6 ft 2 in) diameter

Performance

- Maximum speed: 270 km/h (170 mph, 150 kn) at sea level
- Cruise speed: 225 km/h (140 mph, 121 kn) (econ. cruise, 55% power)
- Stall speed: 95 km/h (59 mph, 51 kn) (flaps down)
- Never exceed speed: 310 km/h (190 mph, 170 kn)
- Range: 1,700 km (1,100 mi, 920 nmi)
- Service ceiling: 5,000 m (16,000 ft)
- Rate of climb: 4.60 m/s (905 ft/min)
- Takeoff run to 15 m (50 ft): 530 m (1,740 ft)
- Landing run from 15 m (50 ft): 400 m (1,300 ft)
