= Wassmer Javelot =

French single seat glider, 1956

Javelot

General information
- Type: Competition and recreational glider
- National origin: France
- Manufacturer: Wassmer Aviation
- Designer: Maurice Collard
- Number built: 120+, all variants

History
- First flight: August 1956

The Wassmer WA 20 Javelot (English: Javelin) and its very similar successors the WA 21 Javelot II and WA 22 Super Javelot are single seat gliders built in France in the 1950s and 1960s. Well over a hundred were sold as club aircraft and over fifty remain on the French civil register in 2010.

== Design and development ==
The Javelot was designed by Maurice Collard to provide a simply constructed glider with good performance to replace pre-war German- designed aircraft like the DFS Weihe and French built DFS Olympia Meise (Nord 2000), as well as the first post war generation of French designs such as the Arsenal Air 100, then widely used by French clubs.

The original WA 20 Javelot, later known as the Javelot I and first flown in August 1956, has an all wood wing of 16.08 m (52 ft 9 in) span and a wing area of 15.5 m^{2} (167 sq ft) giving it an aspect ratio of 16.7. It is shoulder mounted and is in two pieces built around single box spars with leading edge D-shaped, plywood skinned torsion boxes. The wing is fabric covered aft of the spar. There are small endplates at the wing tips, partly to protect them on the ground. The airbrakes deploy both above and below the wing.

The Javelot has a flat-sided, polygonal fuselage, shaped by a steel tube frame and with fabric covering. Forward of the wing there are four longerons and the fuselage is deep and flat sided, which together with a deep, flat topped and sided canopy, which curves in side view, forms a blunt nose. The undercarriage is a combination of rubber sprung nose skid and fixed monowheel. Behind the wing the fuselage has only three longerons, tapers and has a prominent dorsal ridge. The wooden fin and rudder have straight edges and a rounded top; the tailplane, which carries a one piece elevator is mounted on top of the fuselage. There is a tailskid.

A revised, Standard competition class version, the WA 21 Javelot II made its first flight on 25 March 1958. This has a modified wing with a span of 15 m (49 ft 3 in) and 4° of dihedral on the outer parts though none on the constant chord centre section. The Javelot II also introduced separated pairs of differential ailerons as well as altering the wing to fuselage connection. By mid-1960, 50 Javelots had been delivered.

The final production variant, though one that continued to be improved, was the WA 22 Super Javelot, which first flew in June 1961. Initially this combined the wing of the Javelot II with a fuselage built around the same steel tube structure but now with a resin bonded glass cloth covering forward of the wings. The nose was extended to be better streamlined and a new, lower, single piece canopy introduced. Aft, the vertical surfaces remained wood but were swept. The 1964 version of the Super Javelot increased the dihedral on the outer panels to 5.50°, refined the aerodynamics of the wing root to fuselage junction and covered the whole wing with birch ply to encourage laminar flow.

The Wassmer WA 23 was a final, experimental development. It had a Super Javelot fuselage fitted with a new, 18 m (59 ft 1 in) span wing, an aspect ratio of 22 and a new airfoil profile specially designed by Maurice Collard. The empty weight of the WA 23 was 295 kg (650 lb). It flew for the first time on 6 August 1962.

== Operational history ==
In 2010 the civil aircraft registers of European countries outside Russia contained four Javelot Is, fourteen Javelot IIs (one dismantled) and thirty five Super Javelots. All fifty three were French registered.

== Variants ==
WA 20 JavelotTaylor, John W R (1959). Jane's All the World's Aircraft 1959-60. London: Sampson Low, Marston & Co. Ltd. p. 149.
First flight August 1956. Later referred to as the Javelot I.
WA 21 Javelot II
First flight 25 March 1958.
WA 22 Super Javelot
First flight 26 June 1961. Modified forward fuselage and swept fin.
WA 22 Super Javelot 64
1964 model, with increased outer wing dihedral.
WA-22-28
WA-23
Experimental development of the WA 22 with a new wing of 18 m (59 ft) span and aspect ratio 22.

== Aircraft on display ==
- Musée Aéronautique Berry, Touchay, France - Javelot II
- Musée Regional de l'Air, Angers, France - Super Javelot

== Specifications (WA 21 Javelot II) ==
Data from Jane's All the World's Aircraft 1960/61 The World's Sailplanes:Die Segelflugzeuge der Welt:Les Planeurs du Monde Volume II

General characteristics

- Crew: 1
- Length: 7.06 m (23 ft 2 in)
- Wingspan: 15.00 m (49 ft 3 in)
- Height: 1.79 m (5 ft 10 in)
- Wing area: 14.4 m^{2} (155 sq ft)
- Aspect ratio: 15.7
- Airfoil: Root: NACA 63821, Mid: NACA 63821, Tip: NACA 63415
- Empty weight: 200 kg (441 lb)
- Gross weight: 350 kg (772 lb)

Performance

- Stall speed: 58 km/h (36 mph, 31 kn)
- Never exceed speed: 200 km/h (120 mph, 110 kn) *Rough air speed max: 150 km/h (93.2 mph; 81.0 kn)
- Aerotow speed: 140 km/h (87.0 mph; 75.6 kn)
- Winch launch speed: 100 km/h (62.1 mph; 54.0 kn)
- Terminal velocity: with full airbrakes 160 km/h (99 mph; 86 kn)
- Maximum glide ratio: 28:1 at 80 km/h (49.7 mph; 43.2 kn)
- Rate of sink: 0.75 m/s (148 ft/min) minimum at 73 km/h (45.4 mph; 39.4 kn)
- Wing loading: 24.3 kg/m^{2} (5.0 lb/sq ft) maximum

== See also ==
Aircraft of comparable role, configuration and era

- Schleicher Ka 6
- Schweizer SGS 1-26

Related Lists

- List of gliders
