= Wibault =

French aircraft manufacturing company

Société des Avions Michel Wibault
- Industry: Aeronautics, defence
- Founded: 1919
- Founder: Michel Wibault
- Fate: Merged
- Headquarters: Billancourt, France, France
- Products: Aircraft

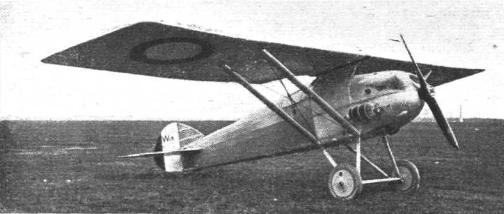
Wibault 3

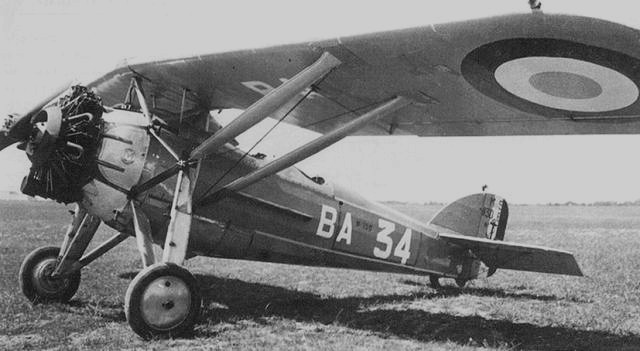
Wibault 74

The Wibault company or Société des Avions Michel Wibault was a French aircraft manufacturing company. Its workshops were located in Billancourt, in the Paris area.

== History ==
The Wibault company was established in 1919 by Michel Wibault. The planes produced by Wibault in the first decade included reconnaissance, fighter and bomber aircraft, but production shifted mainly to civilian aircraft after 1930.

Some of the Wibault designs were quite successful; the Vickers Wibault was a licensed version of the Wibault 7 built by the British company Vickers in the 1920s.

In 1930 Société des Avions Michel Wibault built the Wibault-Penhoët 280, which was funded by the Penhoët (Chantiers St. Nazairre) shipyard and the following year the companies merged to form Chantiers Aéronautiques Wibault-Penhoët. That company produced the Wibault-Penhoët 280 series of trimotor airliners, twelve of which were bought by Air France. They also built transport and racing types but in 1934 were taken over by Breguet Aviation who built several Wibault designs including the Breguet 670 twin-engined airliner.

== Aircraft ==
- Wibault 1 fighter 1918
- Wibault 2 night bomber 1921
- Wibault 3 fighter 1923
- Wibault 7 fighter 1924
- Wibault 72 fighter 1928
- Wibault 73 fighter 1927
- Wibault 74 fighter 1930
- Wibault 8 Simoun fighter
- Wibault 9 fighter 1926
- Wibault 10 twin boom project
- Wibault 10/II re-allocated for two-seat parasol wing reconnaissance aircraft, built for A.2 1923 competition
- Wibault 12 Sirocco fighter
- Wibault 121 Sirocco reconnaissance
- Wibault 122 fighter
- Wibault 123 reconnaissance
- Wibault 124 surveillance 1929
- Wibault 125 reconnaissance 1930
- Wibault 13 Trombe I single seat lightweight fighter to C.1 1926 Jockey fighter contest
- Wibault 130 Trombe I fighter
- Wibault 170 Tornade fighter 1928
- Wibault 210 fighter 1929
- Wibault 220 reconnaissance 1930
- Wibault 240 transport seaplane 1933
- Wibault 260 long range reconnaissance 1930
- Wibault 280T civil airliner 1930
- Wibault 281T
- Wibault 282T
- Wibault 283T
- Wibault 313
- Wibault 360T5 civil airliner 1931
- Wibault 361
- Wibault 362
- Wibault 363
- Wibault 364
- Wibault 365
- Wibault 366
- Wibault 367
- Wibault 368
- Breguet-Wibault 670 civil airliner 1935

=== Significant projects ===
- Wibault 4 heavy bomber project (no data)
- Wibault 5 single-seat parasol-wing fighter project, submitted to C.1 1923
- Wibault 6 two-seat parasol-wing fighter derivative of Wibault 5
- Wibault 11 single-seat fighter project powered by one 500 hp engine, for C.1 1923
- Wibault 14 two-seat parasol wing tourist aircraft project
- Wibault 14H a floatplane version of Wibault 14
- Wibault 15 single-seat fighter project to C.1 1926 contest
- Wibault 160 Trombe II a more powerful version of Wibault 130 Trombe I, also for C.1 1926
- Wibault 230 three-engined transport aircraft project (no data)
- Wibault 270 single-seat lightweight fighter project for C.1 1928
- Wibault 330 transport aircraft (no more details)
- Wibault 340 two-seat low-wing tourist aircraft project
