= Wibault 12 Sirocco =

Wib 12 Sirocco
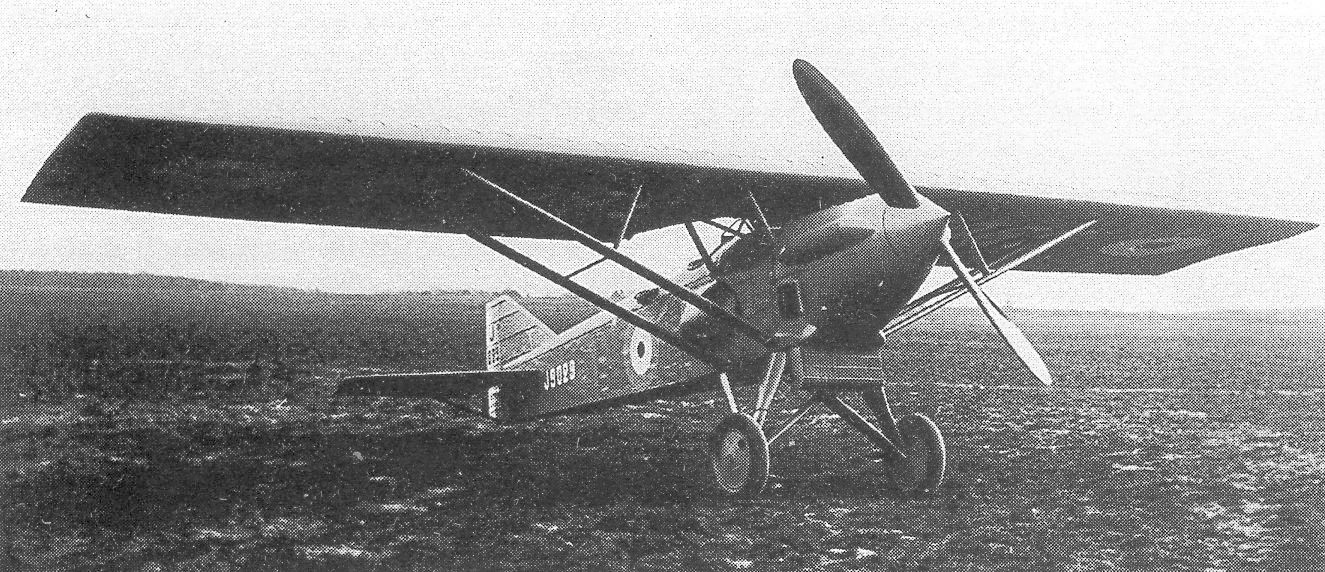
- Wib 122 (Vickers 127)

General information
- Type: Two seat fighter aircraft
- National origin: France
- Manufacturer: Avions Michel Wibault
- Designer: Michel Wibault
- Number built: 3

History
- First flight: May 1926
- Developed from: Wibault 8 Simoun

The Wibault 12 Sirocco or Wib 12 Sirocco was a two-seat, parasol wing fighter aircraft designed and built in France in the 1920s. Three fighter prototypes were completed, one for the RAF and two Army co-operation variants. There was no series production.

== Design ==
The Wib 12 Sirocco, a single engine, two seat, parasol wing fighter was a structurally much revised development of the similarly configured Wib 8 Simoun, following it through the Avions Marcel Wibault works with less than a month between their maiden flights. They were externally very similar but the more refined structure of the Wib 12 made it both stronger and 12% lighter than its predecessor. One major change was the replacement of the Wib 8's box spars with ones of I-section.

The general design followed that of Wibault's family of single- and two-seat fighters, the Wib 3, Wib 7, Wib 8 and Wib 9 but in external detail was closest to the Wib 8. It was an all-metal aircraft, the structure mostly Duralumin and covered with narrow aluminium strips applied longitudinally. The parasol wing was straight edged and of constant chord, braced to the lower fuselage with a pair of parallel struts on each side which met the wing at about mid-span. The Wib 12 had a new pair of jury struts from the main wing struts to the wing underside for strengthening. There were cabane struts over the fuselage and a trailing edge cut-out in the wing over the pilot's cockpit to enhance his visibility. A pair of synchronised 7.7 mm (0.303 in) Vickers machine guns fixed to the fuselage fired forwards through the propeller arc; in addition the rear cockpit was fitted with a pair of Lewis guns of the same calibre on a Scarff ring. A braced tailplane was mounted towards the top of the fuselage, together with an angular fin and rudder.

The Wib 12's engine, the same 500 hp (373 kW) water-cooled V-12 Hispano-Suiza 12Hb type as used by the Wib 8, was totally enclosed and drove a two blade propeller. It was cooled by a retractable, half-cylindrical radiator on the fuselage underside at the back of the engine. Behind the engine the fuselage was flat sided. The fighter had a fixed conventional undercarriage with mainwheels on a split axle attached to the fuselage underside, supported by a pair of V-struts; there was a small tailskid.

The Wib 12 and the Wib 121 (the first and second prototypes) were both flown for the first time in May 1926. The latter was about 8% faster in a climb to 4,000 m (13,125 ft) than the heavier Wib 8. The third aircraft, the Wib 122 was built for Vickers aircraft, with whom Wibault shared patents and collaborative designs. They fitted it with a 410 kW (550 hp) W-12 Napier Lion XI engine and knew it as the Vickers Type 127. To avoid the central bank of cylinders the Vickers guns were moved from the fuselage top to the sides. Its test programme was interrupted by continual engine overheating problems.

When the Service Technique de l'Aéronautique (S.T.Aé, Technical Department of Aeronautics) cancelled the two seat fight specification in 1926, further development by Wibault also ended; though the Wib 121 went on a sales demonstration in Turkey in 1928, no orders were gained. Instead, the company tried to develop the design into a two-seat Army cooperation reconnaissance aircraft. The Wib 124 had its armament modified, having no wing guns and only one fuselage mounted synchronised Vickers machine gun, but with an added ventral Lewis gun. The Wib 125 had the same armament but was powered by a Renault 12Jc 500 hp (373 kW) water-cooled V-12 engine. Again, no orders resulted.

== Variants ==
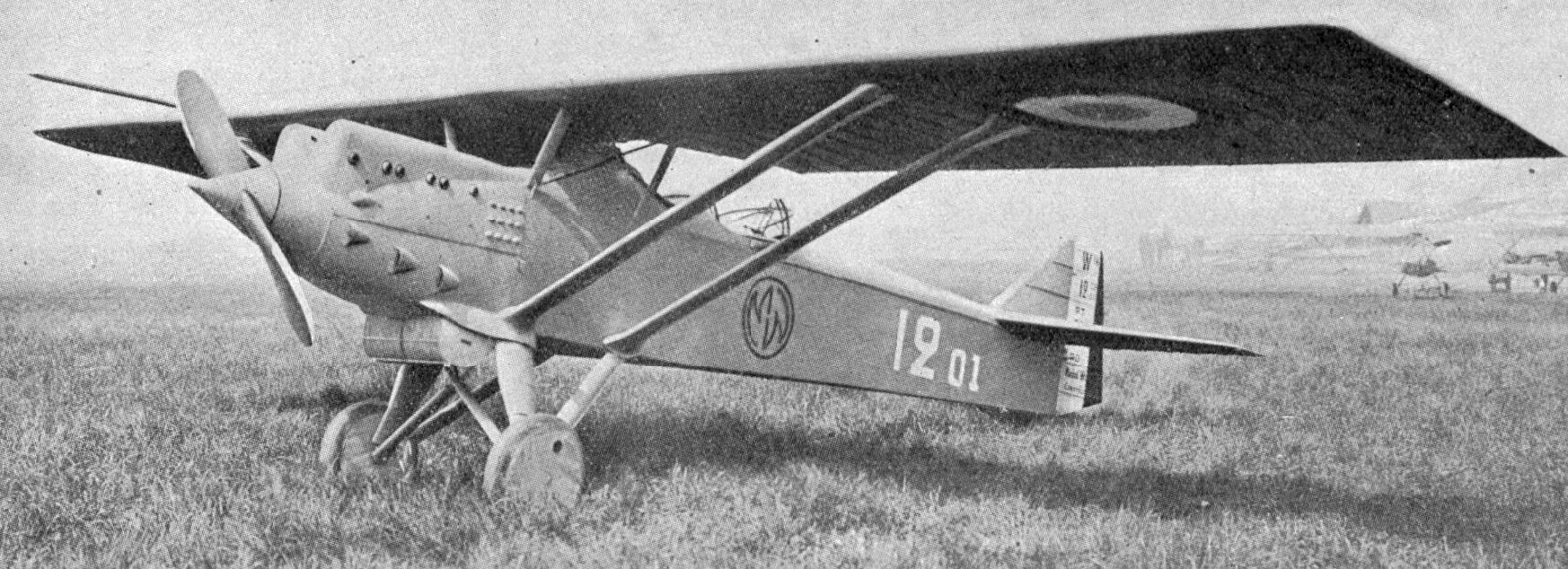
Wibault 12 photo from L'Aéronautique October,1927

C=Chasseur (fighter); A=Army; 2=two-seater. One of each only.

Wib 12 Sirocco C.2
First prototype, fuselage and rear seat guns only.
Wib 121 Sirocco C.2
Second prototype, wing guns added.
Wib 122 Sirocco C.2
One aircraft built as the Vickers Type 127.
Wib 124 A.2
Army co-operation version. No wing guns and only one synchronised Vickers gun in upper fuselage but a ventral Lewis gun added.
Wib 125 A.2
Army co-operation version. Renault 12Jc 500 hp (373 kW) water-cooled V-12 engine, same armament as Wib 124.
Vickers Type 127
\the single Wib 122 Sirocco C.2 built for Vickers, who replaced the Hispano engine with a 410 kW (550 hp) W-12 Napier Lion XI. Vickers referred to it as the Vickers Type 127; its RAF serial was J9029.

== Specifications (Wib 121 C.2) ==
Data from The Complete Book of Fighters, Jane's all the World's Aircraft 1928

General characteristics

- Crew: One
- Length: 9.44 m (31 ft 0 in) (122 C.2 9.09 m (29.8 ft))
- Wingspan: 12.66 m (41 ft 6 in)
- Height: 3.15 m (10 ft 4 in)
- Wing area: 29.63 m^{2} (318.9 sq ft)
- Empty weight: 1,212 kg (2,672 lb) (122 C.2 1,234 kg (2,721 lb))
- Gross weight: 2,050 kg (4,519 lb) (122 C.2 2,085 m (6,841 ft))
- Powerplant: 1 × Hispano-Suiza 12Hb water-cooled upright V-12, 370 kW (500 hp) (122 C.2 410 kW (550 hp) Napier Lion XI W-12)
- Propellers: 2-bladed fixed pitch peropeller

Performance

- Maximum speed: 242 km/h (150 mph, 131 kn) at 3,000 m (9,840 ft)
- Service ceiling: 6,200 m (20,300 ft)
- Time to altitude: 14.15 min 33 s to 4,000 m (13,125 ft)
- Wing loading: 70.5 kg/m^{2} (14.4 lb/sq ft) (122 C.2 70.5 kg/m^{2} (14.4 lb/sq ft))
- Power/mass: 122 C.2 0.196 kW/kg (0.119 hp/lb) with 410 kW (550 hp) Napier Lion XI

Armament

- Wing guns: 2×7.7 mm (0.303 in) unsynchronised Darne machine guns firing outside the propeller arc.
- Fuselage guns 2×7.7 mm (0.303 in) synchronised Vickers machine guns firing through the propeller arc.
- Rear cockpit: 2×7.7 mm (0.303 in) Lewis machine guns on a Scarff ring.
