= Wibault 170 Tornade =

Wib 170C.1 Tornade
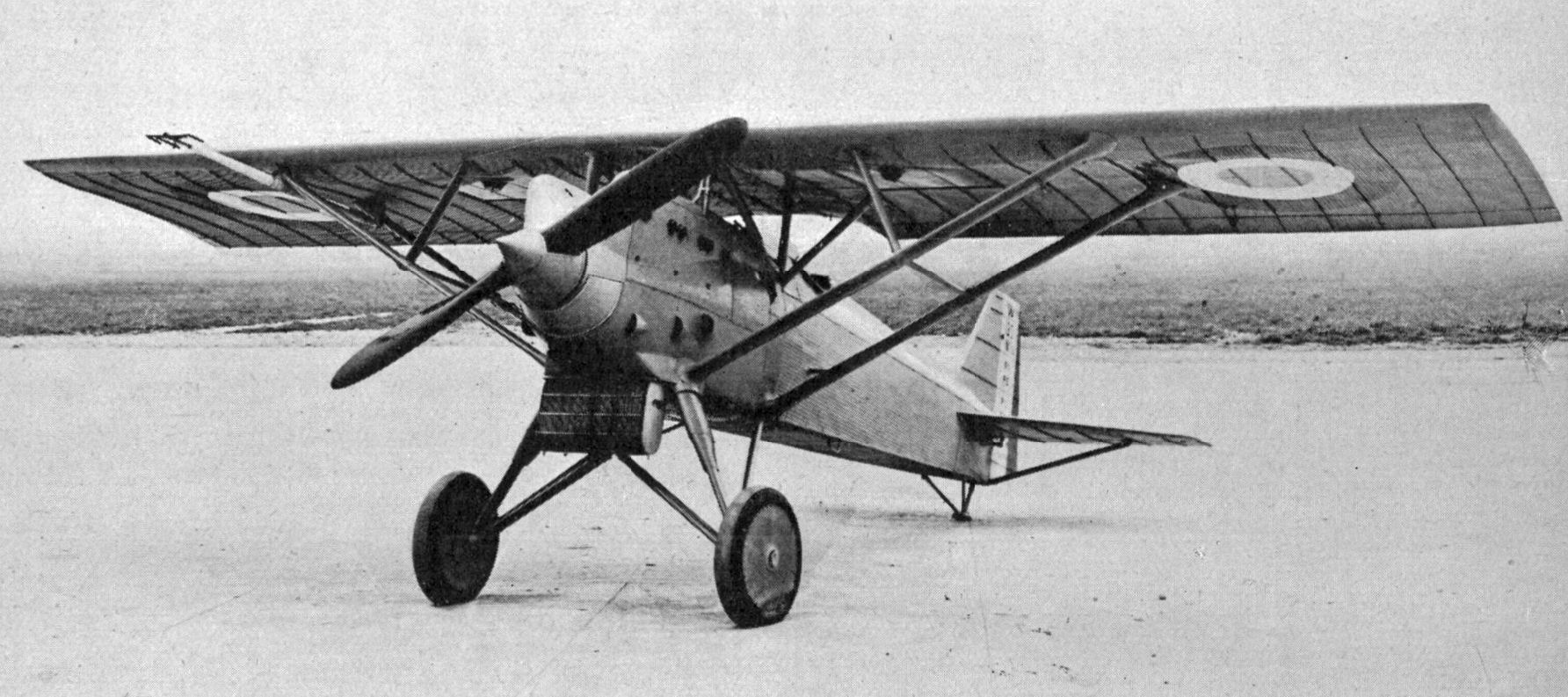
- 130 C.1

General information
- Type: Single seat fighter aircraft
- National origin: France
- Manufacturer: Avions Michel Wibault
- Designer: Michel Wibault
- Number built: 2

History
- First flight: 1928

The Wibault 13C.1 Trombe (Whirlwind), later known as the Wib 130C.1 Trombe was a single seat, parasol wing lightweight fighter aircraft designed and built in France in the 1920s. It was developed into the more powerful Wib 170C.1 Tornade (Tornado) but government interest in lightweight fighters soon waned.

== Design and development ==
The Wib 13 was Avions Marcel Wibault's response to a call from the Service Technique de l'Aéronautique (S.T.Aé, Technical Department of Aeronautics) for a chasseur légere (light fighter). The call, which set out what became known as the Jockey programme, was intended to reduce the ever-increasing weight and cost of fighters. The general design of the Wib 13 followed the pattern set by Wibault's earlier single seat, parasol wing fighters, the Wib 3 and Wib 7 but it was smaller and lighter. An all-metal aircraft, its structure was mostly Duralumin covered with narrow aluminium strips applied longitudinally. The parasol wing was straight edged and of constant chord, braced to the lower fuselage with a pair of parallel struts on each side which met the wing at about mid-span and were strengthened by a pair of jury struts to the wing underside. There were cabane struts over the fuselage and a trailing edge cut-out in the wing over the pilot's cockpit to enhance his visibility. A pair of synchronised 7.7 mm (0.303 in) Vickers machine guns fixed to the fuselage fired forwards through the propeller arc. The Wib 13's initially cantilever tailplane was lowered after flight testing and external bracing added. Tailplane and fin were nearly triangular, the latter bearing a rudder which extended down to the fuselage base, moving between split elevators.

The Wib 13's 400 hp (298 kW) water-cooled V-12 Hispano-Suiza 12Jb engine was totally enclosed under a cowling which fitted closely around each cylinder bank. It drove a two blade propeller and was cooled by a radiator on the fuselage underside at the rear of the engine. Behind the engine the fuselage was flat sided. The fighter had a fixed conventional undercarriage with mainwheels on a split axle attached to the fuselage underside, supported by a pair of V-struts; there was a small tailskid.

By the time the aircraft was flight tested at Villacoublay in 1926 it was known as the Wib 130; around this time several French manufacturers settled on a consistent three digit form for their types numbers. It was assessed as manoeuvrable and robust but somewhat underpowered. Wibault therefore produced the Wib 170 Tornade, which used the same wings, empennage, undercarriage and armament as the Wib 130 but had a more powerful Hispano-Suiza 12Jb V-12 engine which provided 500 hp (373 kW). The fuselage was similar in construction and appearance to that of its predecessor though slightly (330 mm (13 in)) longer. The fuel capacity was increased by 14%. The extra power improved the maximum speed at sea level by 13%, though the empty weight was up by 8%.

The Tornade was first seen in public at the Paris Salon d'Aéronautique in December 1928 and was test flown at Villacoublay early the following year. As well as being faster it had a significantly better climb rate than the Trombe and received all-round good reports. By this time, though the S.T.Aé had lost faith in the chasseur legére concept and wrote off the Jockey programme as a failure.

== Variants ==
C.1=Chasseur (fighter), single seat

Wib 130 Trombe C.1
400 hp (298 kW) Hispano-Suiza 12Jb engine. One built.
Wib 170 Tornade C.1
500 hp (373 kW) Hispano-Suiza 12Hb engine. Two built.

== Specifications (Wib 170 Tornade) ==
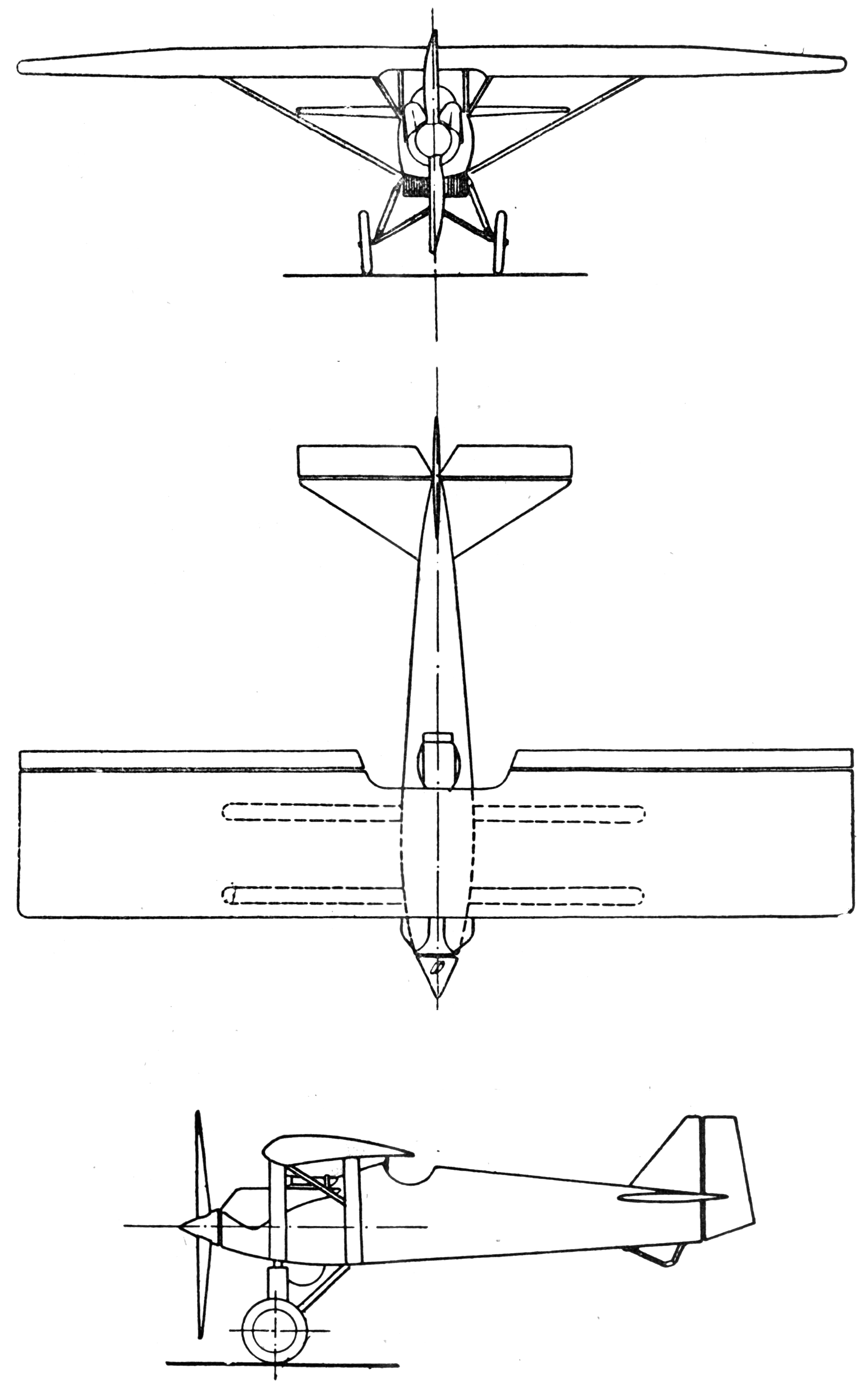
Wibault 13 C.1 3-view drawing from L'Air April 15,1928

Data from Green & Swanborough p.597

General characteristics

- Crew: One
- Length: 7.15 m (23 ft 5 in)
- Wingspan: 9.07 m (29 ft 9 in)
- Height: 2.77 m (9 ft 1 in)
- Wing area: 17.00 m^{2} (183.0 sq ft)
- Empty weight: 965 kg (2,127 lb)
- Gross weight: 1,350 kg (2,976 lb)
- Fuel capacity: 300 L (66 UKgal, 79 USgal)
- Powerplant: 1 × Hispano-Suiza 12Hb water-cooled upright V-12, 370 kW (500 hp)
- Propellers: 2-bladed

Performance

- Maximum speed: 279 km/h (173 mph, 151 kn) at sea level
- Service ceiling: 9,600 m (31,500 ft)
- Time to altitude: 9.15 min to 5,000 m (16,405 ft)

Armament

- Fuselage guns 2×7.7 mm (0.303 in) synchronised Vickers machine guns firing through the propeller arc.
