= Wibault 10/II =

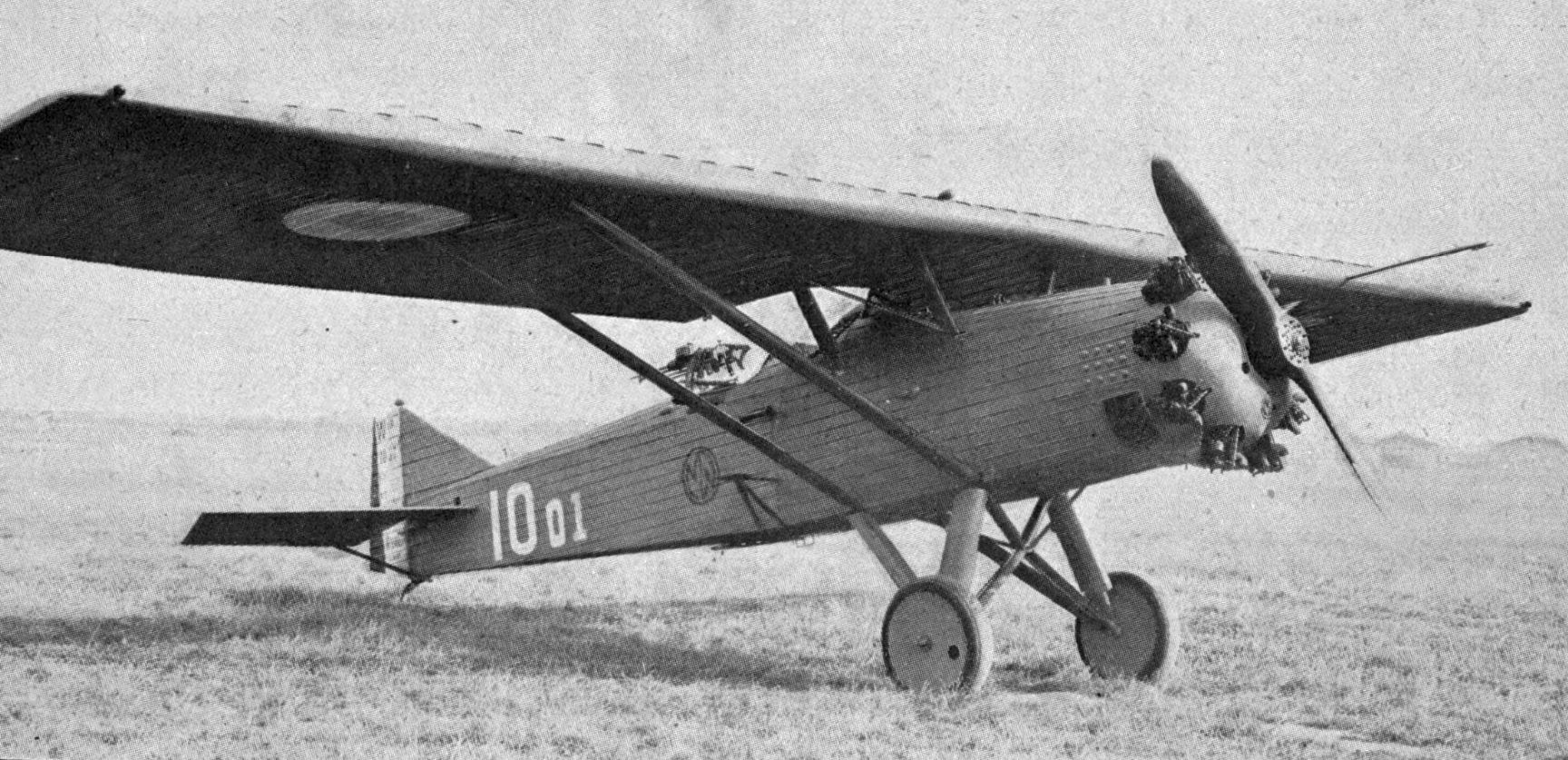
- Wibault 10

General information
- Type: Two-seat reconnaissance aircraft
- National origin: France
- Manufacturer: Société des Avions Michel Wibault
- Designer: Michel Wibault
- Number built: 1

History
- First flight: 1926
- Developed from: Wibault 9

The Wibault 10/II Tramontane was a two-seat reconnaissance aircraft designed and built by Société des Avions Michel Wibault in France for the French military 1923 A.2 competition for a 2-seater reconnaissance aircraft.

== Design and development ==
Derived from the Wibault 9, the Wib 10/II, (the Wibault 10 designation was re-used from an unbuilt project), was a parasol monoplane with two cockpits in tandem to house the pilot and observer. As with previous Wibault aircraft the Wib 10/II was built entirely from Duralumin with corrugated sheet skin and a strut-braced parasol wing.

Power was supplied by a 310 kW (420 hp) Gnome & Rhône 9Ac 9-cyl. air-cooled radial engine with a crankcase cowl leaving just the cylinders exposed. Pilot and observer were housed in tandem cockpits with fixed armament of 2x 7.7 mm (0.303 in) Vickers machine guns, synchronised to fire through the propeller, mounted in the forward fuselage and 2x 7.7 mm (0.303 in) Lewis machine guns on a manually aimed mount in the rear cockpit.

== Specifications ==
Data from

General characteristics

- Crew: 2
- Length: 8.94 m (29 ft 4 in)
- Wingspan: 12.66 m (41 ft 6 in)
- Height: 3.2 m (10 ft 6 in)
- Wing area: 29.6 m^{2} (319 sq ft)
- Empty weight: 1,032 kg (2,275 lb)
- Gross weight: 1,905 kg (4,200 lb)
- Powerplant: 1 × Gnome & Rhône 9Ac 9-cyl. air-cooled radial piston engine, 310 kW (420 hp)

Performance

- Maximum speed: 225 km/h (140 mph, 121 kn) at sea level
- Cruise speed: 192 km/h (119 mph, 104 kn)
- Range: 600 km (370 mi, 320 nmi)
- Service ceiling: 7,400 m (24,300 ft)
- Time to altitude: 6,000 m (20,000 ft) in 35 minutes 30 seconds

Armament

- 2 x 7.7 mm (0.303 in) Vickers machine guns, synchronised to fire through the propeller, mounted in the forward fuselage
- 2 x 7.7 mm (0.303 in) Lewis machine guns on a manually aimed mount in the rear cockpit.
