= Wibault 210 =

Wib 210
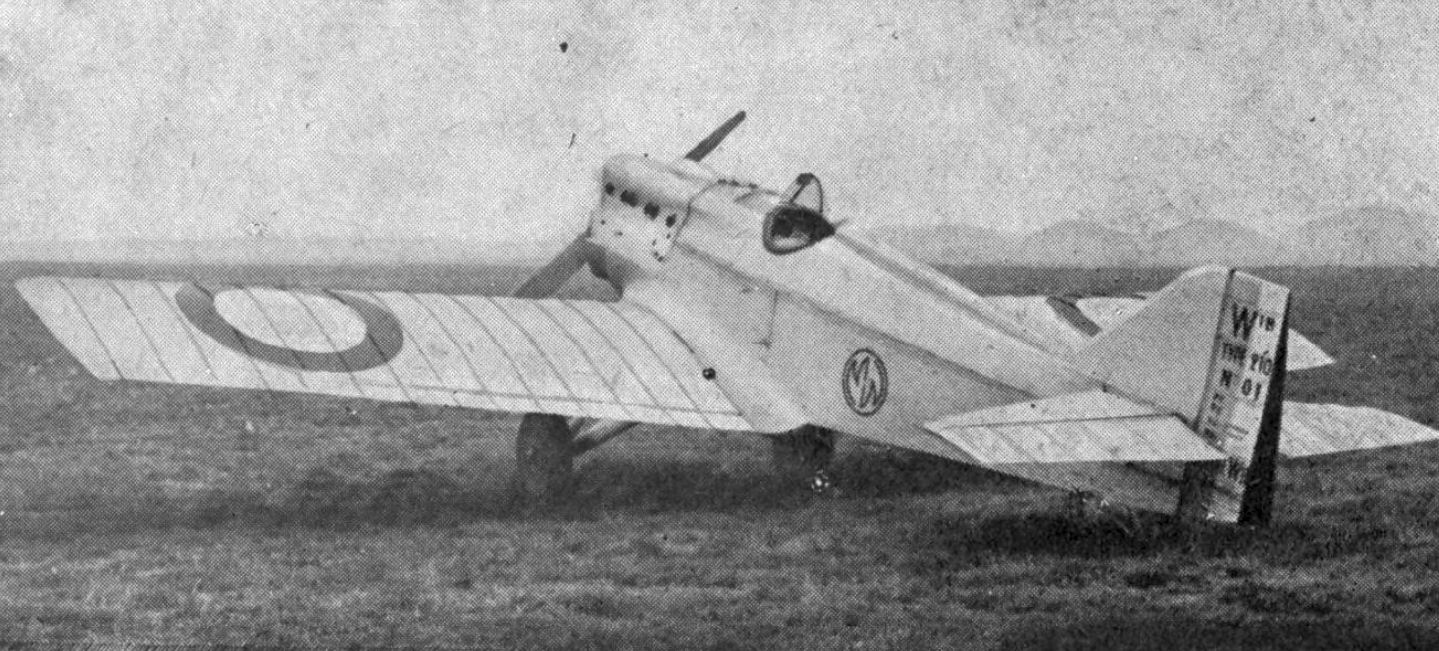

General information
- Type: Single seat fighter
- National origin: France
- Manufacturer: Avions Michel Wibault
- Designer: Michel Wibault
- Number built: 2

History
- First flight: late April 1929

The Wibault Wib 210 C.1 was a single engine, single seat low wing monoplane fighter aircraft, designed and built in France in the late 1920s. Flight tests revealed vibration problems and development was quickly abandoned.

== Design and development ==
The Wib 210 was designed in response to a 1928 Service Technique de l'Aéronautique (S.T.Aé, Technical Department of Aeronautics) single-seat fighter (C.1) programme. Like the Wib 170 Tornarde, which was being developed at the same time, it was a lightweight aircraft (chasseur légere) but as a low wing cantilever monoplane it ended decisively Wibault's long series of parasol wing fighters. Their proposal won them an order for two prototypes.

Like earlier Wibault designs, the Wib 210 was an all-metal aircraft with a largely Duralumin structure and clad with narrow aluminium strips applied longitudinally. Its wings, mounted with mild dihedral, were straight edged and tapered with blunt wing tips. Full span ailerons were fitted. The triangular tailplane carried split elevators and the fin was angular, with a swept leading edge and square tip, bearing a rudder which extended down between the elevators to the keel.

The fuselage was flat sided with rounded decking; the single open cockpit was situated just ahead of the wing trailing edge. The Wib 210 was powered by an upright, liquid cooled V-12 Hispano-Suiza 12Hb driving a two bladed propeller. This was closely cowled, following the profiles of the two banks of cylinders individually. A rectangular radiator, as wide as the fuselage, was placed under the wing between the undercarriage legs. The fixed, conventional undercarriage was of the split axle type, with the axles fixed to the centre of the fuselage underside and the mainwheels mounted on V-struts. There was a small tailskid. The Wib 210 was armed with a pair of 7.7 mm (0.303 in) synchronised machine guns firing through the propeller arc.

Flight testing began at Villacoublay late in April 1929 but the first flight revealed a serious vibration problem in the rear fuselage and empennage. The Wib 210 was modified and returned to the air at the end of the next month. Its flight reports were not encouraging and vibration remained an issue when speeds greater than 350 km/h (217 mph) were reached in shallow dives. In consequence development ended.

== Specifications ==
Data from Green and Swanborough p.597

General characteristics

- Crew: One
- Length: 6.87 m (22 ft 6 in)
- Wingspan: 9.40 m (30 ft 10 in)
- Height: 2.30 m (7 ft 7 in)
- Wing area: 16.00 m^{2} (172.2 sq ft)
- Empty weight: 1,016 kg (2,240 lb)
- Gross weight: 1,320 kg (2,910 lb)
- Powerplant: 1 × Hispano-Suiza 12Hb water-cooled upright V-12, 370 kW (500 hp)
- Propellers: 2-bladed

Performance

- Maximum speed: 300 km/h (190 mph, 160 kn) at sea level
- Service ceiling: 8,000 m (26,000 ft)
- Time to altitude: 7.7 min to 3,000 m (9,840 ft)

Armament

- Guns: 2×7.7 mm (0.303 in) synchronised machine guns firing through propeller arc.

== Bibliography ==
- Bruner, Georges (1977). "Fighters a la Francaise, Part One". Air Enthusiast (3): 85–95. ISSN 0143-5450.
- Cortet, Pierre (April 1998). "Rétros du Mois" [Retros of the Month]. Avions: Toute l'aéronautique et son histoire (in French) (61): 15. ISSN 1243-8650.
