= Wibault 368 =

General information
- Type: Long-range aircraft
- National origin: France
- Manufacturer: Wibault
- Number built: 1

History
- First flight: 15 June 1937
- Developed from: Wibault 360

The Wibault 368 was a single-engined aircraft built to contend for a French government prize for a long-range aircraft using a diesel engine in the late 1930s.

== Specifications (variant specified) ==
Data from L'avion de record Wibault 368: une filiation peu courante...

General characteristics

- Crew: 2
- Length: 11.876 m (39 ft 0 in)
- Wingspan: 17.102 m (56 ft 1 in)
- Height: 4.25 m (13 ft 11 in)
- Wing area: 37 m^{2} (400 sq ft)
- Empty weight: 2,102 kg (4,634 lb)
- Max takeoff weight: 5,090 kg (11,222 lb)
- Fuel capacity: 2,960 litres (650 imp gal; 780 US gal)
- Powerplant: 1 × Clerget 14 F2 14-cylinder radial diesel engine, 370 kW (500 hp)
- Propellers: 2-bladed

Performance

- Maximum speed: 270 km/h (170 mph, 150 kn)
- Range: 10,000 km (6,200 mi, 5,400 nmi)
- Service ceiling: 5,000 m (16,000 ft)

== Bibliography ==
- Cortet, Pierre (November 2000). "L'avion de record Wibault 368: une filiation peu courante..." [The Wibault 368: A Record-contender of Unusual Parentage]. Avions: Toute l'Aéronautique et son histoire (in French) (92): 28–30. ISSN 1243-8650.
