= Vickers Viastra =

12-seat passenger high-wing monoplane

Viastra
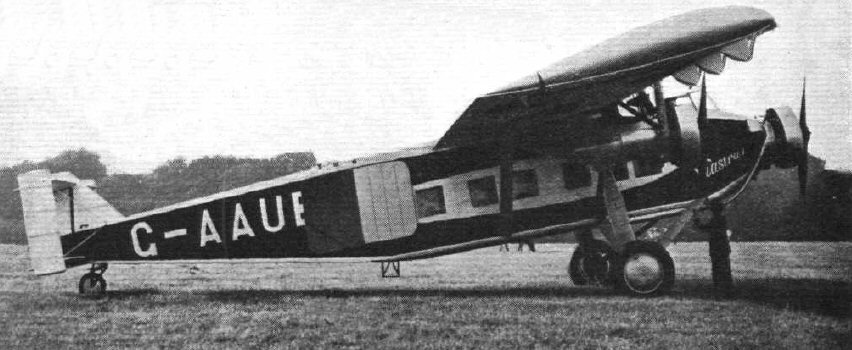
- Viastra I

General information
- Type: Passenger transport
- National origin: United Kingdom
- Manufacturer: Vickers Ltd
- Primary user: West Australian Airways
- Number built: 6

History
- First flight: 1 October 1930
- Retired: 1937

The Vickers Viastra was an all-metal 12-seat passenger high-wing monoplane, with variants powered by one, two and three engines. Two twin-engined Viastras operated commercially in Australia from 1931-6; another served as a Royal transport.

== Development ==
The Vickers-Wibault construction method was based on the patents of Michel Wibault, who began working with Vickers in 1922. It was a way of producing an all-metal aircraft with an airframe built up from simple, non-machined metal shapes, covered with very thin e.g. 0.016 in (0.4 mm) corrugated light alloy sheets. Skin panels were riveted to each other and to the underlying structure; the skin on the wings was not stressed. Vickers' first experience of the method was with the licence built Wibault Scout. The first Vickers design using this construction was the Vireo and the third, the Viastra, used a blend of Wibault and Vickers construction techniques.

The Viastra was envisaged as a one or three-engined commercial aircraft capable of carrying ten passengers and designed with an eye to operations in countries with poor surface transport facilities. Vickers built several variants, largely similar apart from the engines: ultimately, there were Viastras with one, two and three engines. They were high-wing monoplanes, the wings having constant chord, square tips and a thick Raf 24 section. The wings, like the rest of the aircraft were covered with the corrugated skin and carried balanced ailerons and outboard slots. There was a biplane tail unit with a pair of narrow chord planes, the lower attached to the fuselage underside and the upper mounted clear above. The outboard vertical tail surfaces were again very narrow and served as the main rudders; the single-engined and tri-motor variants also had a small triangular central fin, carrying an auxiliary rudder and supporting the upper horizontal plane. With one exception, the twin-engined Viastras had the central fin and rudder replaced by tubular bracing.

The fuselage had a square cross-section, parallel in the passenger cabin area and narrowing towards the tail. The passenger compartment had six rectangular windows on each side and the crew had an enclosed cabin forward of the wings. Each wing was braced to the lower fuselage with a parallel pair of struts; the forward of these was used to carry a main undercarriage leg with the help of further robust strutting. The two and three-engined Viastras had their outer engines mounted just below the wings. The outer engines were enclosed by a narrow chord Townend ring, but the central engines of the tri-motored and single-engined Viastras were uncowled.

== Operational history ==
The first Viastra, registered as G-AAUB and powered by three 270 hp (200 kW) Armstrong Siddeley Lynx Major 7-cylinder radial engines first flew on 1 October 1930. It was followed by a pair of Viastra IIs that flew on the Perth-Adelaide route with West Australian Airways from March 1931. One was lost in a landing accident in 1933, but the other continued in service until 1936. They were both configured as twelve seaters and initially powered by a pair of 525 hp (390 kW) Bristol Jupiter XIF radials, although on occasions they flew with one or two Jupiter VIs because the higher rated XIFs proved troublesome. The Australian operation showed that the twin-engined Viastra II was a little underpowered in that it could not hold altitude on only one engine. Vickers confirmed this by replacing the Lynx engines of G-AAUB with Jupiter VIFMs. In this guise it was known as the Viastra VIII. The first of the two West Australian Airways aircraft was briefly converted into a Viastra IX, which had its engines lowered by 15 in (380 mm) before reconversion to a Viastra II. West Australian Airways also ordered a single-engined Viastra, with Jupiter XIF power but the order was cancelled, probably because of the unreliability of that engine, and it remained in the UK.

In between its tri-motor Lynx and Jupiter lives, G-AAUB flew for a time as a twin Armstrong Siddeley Jaguar VIc (470 hp (350 kW) 14-cylinder radial engines) powered Viastra III, otherwise similar to the Viastra II. The Viastra X G-ACCC was a one-off twin powered by Bristol Pegasus IIL3s 9-cylinder radials, built as a "Royal barge" for the Prince of Wales and lavishly kitted out. This aircraft had a spatted undercarriage, an under-fuselage pannier and the central fin/rudder otherwise reserved for the odd engined Viastras. First flown in April 1933, it was little used as a barge, though it joined the 1934 Hendon RAF display in royal livery. After that and until 1937 it was used to test airborne radios, carrying the wireless operators in unusual luxury.

One more Viastra was built, using a new and lighter weight wing designed by B. E. Wallis. It was taken to the Royal Aircraft Establishment at Farnborough for structural tests but there is no record that it flew. It did not receive a Viastra variant number.

== Variants ==
Viastra I (Type 160)
Prototype ten-passenger variant with three Armstrong Siddeley Lynx V engines, one built registered G-AUUB later modified as a two-engined Vastra III and later back to three-engines as the Viastra VIII.
Viastra II (Type 198)
12-seater passenger variant for West Australian Airways with two Jupiter XIF engines, two built
Viastra III (Type 199)
Viastra I converted with two Jaguar VIc engines, later modified back to three-engines as the Viasta VIII.
Viastra VI (Type 203)
Single-engined freighter version powered by a Jupiter XIF: one built but never delivered.
Viastra VIII (Type 220)
Viastra III converted with three Jupiter VIFM
Viastra IX (Type 242)
brief conversion of a Viastra II, with lowered engines
Viastra X (Type 259)
Seven-seat VIP passenger version for the Prince of Wales with two Pegasus radial engines, one built registered G-ACCC.
Wallis-Viastra (Type 256)
new wing, possibly never flown: one built.

== Specifications (Viastra II) ==
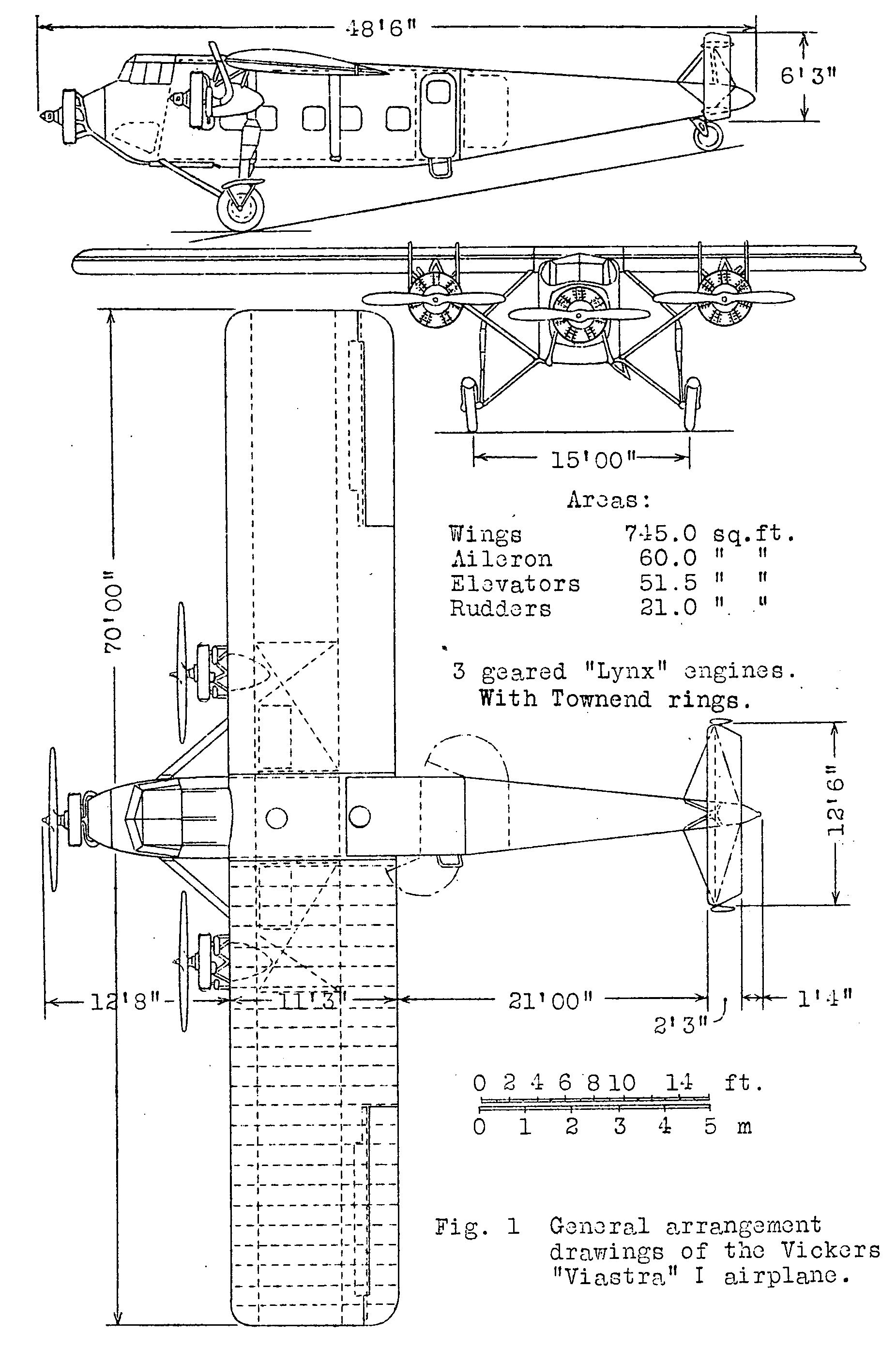
Vickers Viastra 3-view drawing from NACA Aircraft Circular No.129

Data from

General characteristics

- Crew: 2
- Capacity: 12 passengers
- Length: 45 ft 6 in (13.87 m)
- Wingspan: 70 ft 0 in (21.34 m)
- Height: 13 ft 6 in (4.11 m)
- Wing area: 745 sq ft (69.2 m^{2})
- Empty weight: 7,880 lb (3,574 kg)
- Gross weight: 12,350 lb (5,602 kg)
- Powerplant: 2 × Bristol Jupiter XIF 9-cylinder radial, 525 hp (391 kW) each

Performance

- Maximum speed: 120 mph (190 km/h, 100 kn)
- Range: 535 mi (861 km, 465 nmi)
- Rate of climb: 970 ft/min (4.9 m/s)
- Time to altitude: 4.5 min to 4,920 ft (1,500 m)
