= Bréguet 670T =

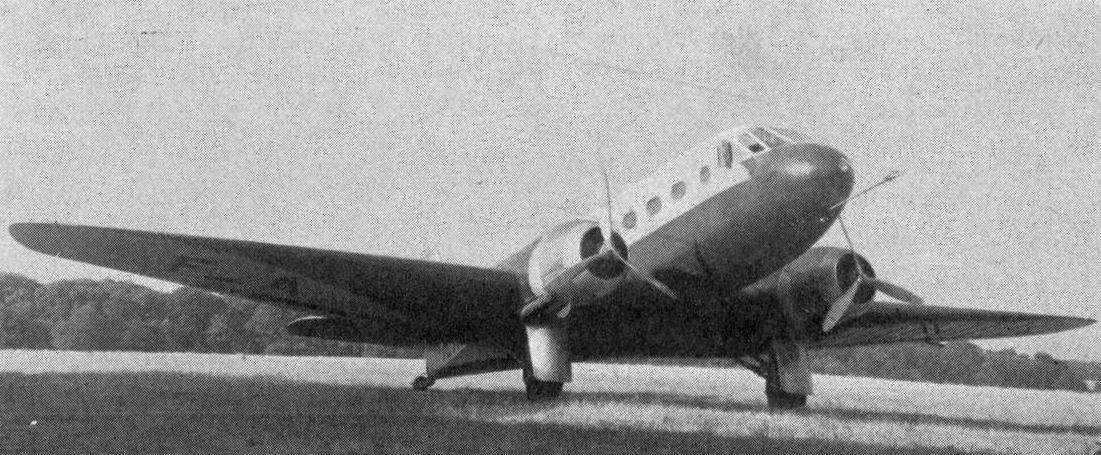

General information
- Type: 18 seat airliner
- National origin: France
- Manufacturer: Société des Avions Louis Bréguet
- Designer: Michel Wibault
- Number built: 1

History
- First flight: 1 or 16 March 1935

The Bréguet 670, Bréguet 670T or Bréguet-Wibault 670 was a French twin engine, all metal eighteen seat airliner with a retractable undercarriage flown in 1935. Only one was built.

== Design ==
In 1934 Bréguet acquired Chantiers Aéronautiques Wibault-Penhoët and produced some of their unbuilt designs. The Bréguet 670 was one of these, an all-metal, low wing, twin engine airliner accommodating eighteen passengers. Engine layout apart, it was similar to though larger than the successful trimotor Wibault-Penhoët 282, used by six French airlines including Air France. In the mid-1930s companies worldwide were designing and producing twin engine aircraft of the same configuration, most notably the earlier Douglas DC-2, which was less powerful and carried only fourteen passengers.

The Bréguet 670's wing had a constant thickness centre section, with wing roots faired into the fuselage on its trailing edges, and two outer panels, tapering in both thickness and plan to semi-elliptical tips. It was a two spar structure, with sheet duralumin, I-section spars which had extruded webs, and was duralumin skinned. Narrow chord slotted ailerons occupied the outer two-thirds of the span and the rest fitted with similar flaps.

It was powered by two wing-mounted 615 kW (825 hp) Gnome-Rhône 14Krs Mistral Major fourteen cylinder radial engines driving three blade variable pitch propellers. The engine mountings were steel tube structures supported by the longerons; the engine cowlings were most prominent above the wings. The main legs of the 5.56 m (18 ft 3 in) track landing gear, with fairings mounted on the front of, them retracted rearwards into the cowlings. The undercarriage was completed with an oleo mounted, steerable tailwheel. There were fuel tanks in the central section of the wings between both the engines and the longerons.

The fuselage was duralumin throughout and was flat sided and bottomed, though its top was slightly rounded and the nose was rounded in both plan and elevation. The pilots' cabin had two seats side-by-side, fitted with dual control and radio equipment by the righthand seat. Behind them there was a separate cabin with a 0.75 m × 1.8 m (2 ft 6 in × 5 ft 11 in) floor, which could be fitted as a navigator's post or a bar and gave access to an underfloor baggage hold; a port-side external door accessed this space and allowed the pilots to reach their positions via an internal door. A second internal door opened into the passenger cabin, 9.1 m × 1.8 m (29 ft 10 in × 5 ft 11 in) in plan and 1.75 m (5 ft 9 in) high, which had nine rows of seats, one on each side under its own window. There was a toilet at the rear and behind it a final space containing a library and the main passenger door port-side.

The Bréguet 670 was designed so that it could be adapted to carry cargo or mail instead of passengers. With a 2,030 kg (4,480 lb) payload, its range was 750 km (470 mi) but reducing this to 1,320 kg (2,910 lb) increased the range to 1,500 km (930 mi).

The empennage was conventional, with a tapered, round tipped horizontal tail mounted on top of the fuselage. The fin and rudder were straight edged, meeting in a rounded top. Neither the rudder, which reached down to the keel and worked in a small cut-out between the elevators, nor the elevators were balanced.

== Operational history ==
Two slightly different dates for the first flight appear in the contemporary literature, 1 March 1935 and 16 March 1935. This was followed by about six months testing and refining at the hands of pilots Détroyat and Ribière before going for its air ministry tests at Villacoubly.

The Bréguet 670 did not go into production and only the prototype was built. In June 1936 structural problems appeared when the passenger door detached from the fuselage whilst the aircraft was on the ground; it turned out that the adhesive attaching soundproofing material to the cabin walls was attacking the duralumin. After a major rebuild ownership passed in March 1938 to La Société Française des Transports Aériens, a company formed to supply aircraft clandestinely to the Spanish Republican government forces during the Spanish Civil War. It may have been used for spares or re-registered in Spain but destroyed by bombing in Catalonia.

== Specifications ==
Data from L'année aéronautique 1934-5

General characteristics

- Crew: Two
- Capacity: 18 passengers
- Length: 18.74 m (61 ft 6 in)
- Wingspan: 24.86 m (81 ft 7 in)
- Height: 7.2 m (23 ft 7 in)
- Wing area: 78.6 m^{2} (846 sq ft)
- Empty weight: 5,059 kg (11,153 lb)
- Gross weight: 9,009 kg (19,861 lb)
- Fuel capacity: 1,100 kg (2,400 lb) fuel + oil
- Powerplant: 2 × Gnome-Rhône 14Krsd Mistral Major 14-cylinder, supercharged twin row radials, geared down 3/2, 615 kW (825 hp) each
- Propellers: 3-bladed, 3.10 m (10 ft 2 in) diameter variable pitch

Performance

- Maximum speed: 340 km/h (210 mph, 180 kn) at 2,000 m (6,600 ft)
- Cruise speed: 300 km/h (190 mph, 160 kn) at 60% power
- Range: 2,000 km (1,200 mi, 1,100 nmi) with a 1,465 kg (3,230 lb) payload
- Service ceiling: 6,000 m (20,000 ft)
- Landing speed: 105 km/h (65 mph; 57 kn)
- Landing distance: 550 m (1,800 ft)
