= Wibault 313 =

Wib 313

General information
- Type: Single seat fighter
- National origin: France
- Manufacturer: Avions Michel Wibault
- Designer: Michel Wibault
- Number built: 1

History
- First flight: late November 1932

The Wibault 313, Wibault Wib 313 or Penhoët Wibault Wib 313 was a single engine, single seat low wing monoplane fighter aircraft, designed and built in France in the early 1930s. It was entered into a government competitive tender programme but was not ordered.

== Design and development ==
The Wib 313 was designed for the 1930 Service Technique de l'Aéronautique (S.T.Aé, Technical Department of Aeronautics) single-seat fighter (C.1) programme. It was a low wing cantilever monoplane, as were all its many competitors but unlike the others it was powered by a radial engine. It also moved away from Wibault's tradition of angular wing plans and empennages and flat sided fuselages. It was designed and constructed by Avions Michel Wibault, though the company merged with Chantiers de Saint-Nazaire, forming Chantiers Aéronautiques Wibault-Penhoët before the Wib 313 was completed.

The Wib 313 was an all-metal aircraft. Its wings, mounted with mild dihedral, were straight edged and tapered with rounded wing tips. Narrow chord ailerons occupied about three-quarters of the trailing edges. The tail surfaces were also straight tapered and round tipped; the fin was tall and the rudder ended at the top of the fuselage, with the tailplane mounted about halfway up the fuselage. The latter was oval in cross section, with a slightly humped upper line. The cockpit was placed at the highest point, just ahead of the wing trailing edge. The fighter's 520 hp (388 kW) nine cylinder Gnome-Rhône 9Kbrs radial engine was neatly enclosed within a short cowling and drove a variable-pitch propeller, a novelty at the time. The Wib 313's fixed, conventional undercarriage was wide track, the mainwheels enclosed in fairings and attached to the wings by vertical, faired legs which were cross braced to the central fuselage underside. There was a small tailskid. A 7.7 mm (0.303 in) unsynchronised Darne machine gun in a shallow fairing was mounted outboard of each undercarriage leg, firing outside the propeller arc.

The Wib 313 was flown for the first time in late November 1932 at Villacoublay and competitive flight testing continued until September 1933, when it was returned to the factory for modifications. The fighter had returned to Villacoublay by December but by then a contract had been awarded for the Dewoitine D.500; the Wib 313 was criticized for its poor rate of climb and limited pilot's view. Development work on the Wib 313 ended the following month.

== Specifications ==
Data from Green and Swanborough p.597

General characteristics

- Crew: One
- Length: 7.00 m (23 ft 0 in)
- Wingspan: 11.35 m (37 ft 3 in)
- Height: 3.45 m (11 ft 4 in)
- Wing area: 16.56 m^{2} (178.3 sq ft)
- Empty weight: 1,153 kg (2,542 lb)
- Gross weight: 1,556 kg (3,430 lb)
- Powerplant: 1 × Gnome-Rhône 9Kbrs 9-cylinder radial, 390 kW (520 hp)
- Propellers: 2-bladed variable pitch

Performance

- Maximum speed: 372 km/h (231 mph, 201 kn) at 5,000 m (16,405 ft)
- Range: 800 km (500 mi, 430 nmi)
- Time to altitude: 50 min to 11,250 m (36,910 ft)

Armament

- Guns: 2 × 7.7 mm (0.303 in) unsynchronised Darne machine guns firing outside propeller arc

== Bibliography ==
- Cortet, Pierre (April 1998). "Rétros du Mois" [Retros of the Month]. Avions: Toute l'aéronautique et son histoire (in French) (61): 15. ISSN 1243-8650.
