= Simoun =

- Simoom, a strong, dry, dust-laden local wind in Sahara, Palestine, Jordan, Syria, and the Arabian Peninsula
- Caudron Simoun, a 1930s aircraft
- Simoun (TV series), a Japanese animated TV series and its manga adaptations featuring aircraft called Simoun
- Simoun, the false identity of Crisóstomo Ibarra, one of the main characters of El filibusterismo by José Rizal
- Henri Simoun, Howard Rodman's pseudonym when working on The Six Million Dollar Man film adaptation
- French destroyer Simoun, a Bourrasque-class destroyer
- Wibault 8 Simoun, a 1920s fighter aircraft

== See also ==
- Simoom (disambiguation)
- Simon (disambiguation)
