= Simoom (disambiguation) =

Simoom is a strong, dry, dust-laden local wind in Sahara, Palestine, Jordan, Syria, and the Arabian Peninsula.

Simoom may also refer to:

- "Simoon", a song by Japanese electronic band Yellow Magic Orchestra on their first album
- HMS Simoom, six different ships of the Royal Navy
- Operation Simoom, a Polish intelligence operation
- Simoom Sound, a sound on the Central Coast of British Columbia
- Simoom Sound, British Columbia, the post office located on the sound
- "Simoom", a song by the Creatures on their album Boomerang
- Project Simoom, a Swedish and Saudi Arabian military project
- Simoom (album) by composer Lois V Vierk
- Simoom Hill, a hill on the western Antarctic Peninsula
- Simoom, a one-act play by August Strindberg
- Simoom, a Djinni in the video game Golden Sun: Dark Dawn

== See also ==
- Simoun (disambiguation)
