= Wibault 360 =

French passenger aircraft

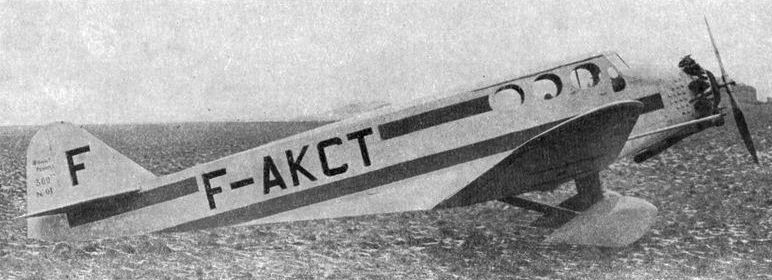
- Wibault 365

General information
- Type: Airliner
- National origin: France
- Manufacturer: Wibault
- Designer: Michel Wibault

History
- First flight: 1931

The Wibault 360 was a 1930s French five-passenger airliner designed and built by the Wibault company.

== Design and development ==
The Wibault 360 was a low-wing monoplane powered by a 230 hp (172 kW) Salmson 9Ab radial engine and equipped with conventional landing gear. The design was based on the earlier three-engined Wibault 283 but the 360 was smaller and had an enclosed cabin for a pilot and five passengers. The prototype, designated the 360T5, first flew in August 1931. A number of variants were built with different engines, the last of the series was the Wib.366 designed to compete in the 1934 London to Melbourne air race.

== Variants ==
360T5
Prototype with a 230 hp (172 kW) Salmson 9Ab radial engine, one built.
362
Variant powered by a 300 hp (224 kW) Gnome-Rhône 7Kb engine, two built in 1933.
365
Six-seat variant powered by a 500 hp (373 kW) Gnome-Rhône 9Kbrs radial engine, one built in 1933.
366
Variant for the MacRobertson Air Race powered by a 500 hp (373 kW) Hispano-Suiza 12Ybrs engine, it had a cruising speed of 250 km/h (155 mph), it did not take part in the race.
367
The Wibault 365 modified with a retractable landing gear.

== Specifications (360 T.5) ==
Data from Air Transport: The Wibault Penhoet 360 T.5 Monoplane

General characteristics

- Crew: 1
- Capacity: 4 passengers
- Length: 11.18 m (36 ft 8 in)
- Wingspan: 16.97 m (55 ft 8 in)
- Height: 2.94 m (9 ft 8 in)
- Wing area: 31.8 m^{2} (342 sq ft)
- Empty weight: 1,272 kg (2,804 lb)
- Gross weight: 1,900 kg (4,189 lb)
- Powerplant: 1 × Salmson radial engine, 170 kW (230 hp)

Performance

- Maximum speed: 203 km/h (126 mph, 110 kn) at sea level
- Service ceiling: 5,000 m (16,000 ft)
