= Wibault 2 =

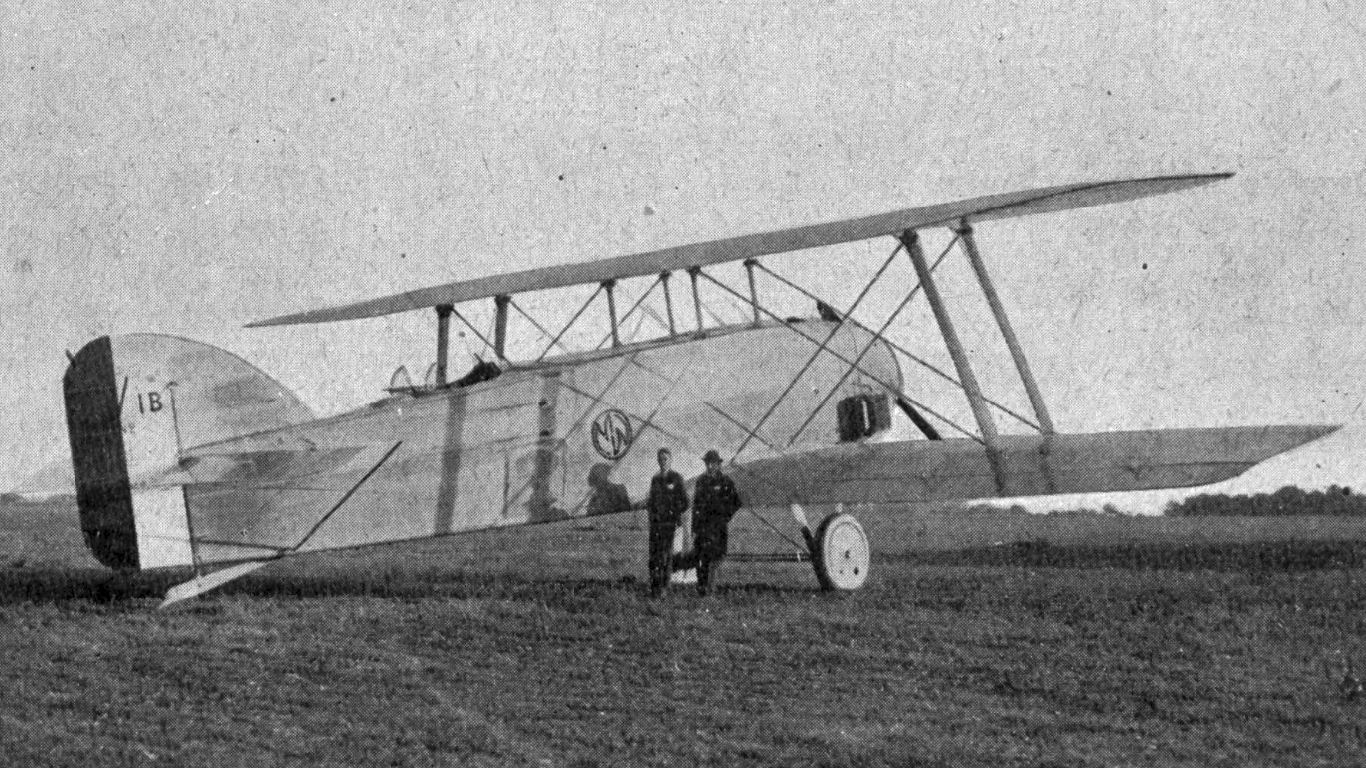

General information
- Type: Night bomber
- National origin: France
- Manufacturer: Pierre Lavasseur
- Designer: Michel Wibault
- Number built: 1

History
- First flight: 29 October 1921

The Wibault 2, Wib 2 or Wib 2 BN.2 was a single engine biplane aircraft designed and built in France in the early 1920s. It was intended as a heavy night bomber, though a thirteen-seat passenger version was proposed. Only one was built.

== Design and development ==
As the military description BN.2 indicates, the Wib 2 was designed as a two-seat night bomber, but the designer had hopes of a passenger carrying derivative. As it was structurally an all-metal aircraft it had, by the standards of the times, a low structural weight and, as a consequence, a high useful load of 1,406 kg (3,100 lb) making the suggested capacity of thirteen passengers plausible. In addition to its metal construction, contemporaries noted other unusual design features, in particular the position of the wings well back along the fuselage, Flight speculated the idea being to distribute the passenger (or bomb) load symmetrically about the centre of pressure and over a greater longitudinal distance than usual, rather than along the span. The pilot sat quite close to the tail with the gunner (in the bomber version) in a separate, gun mounting equipped cockpit immediately behind him. Its span was large for a biplane with only a single set of struts and its upper wing had a shorter span than the lower.

The wings of the Wib 2 were rectangular in plan and mounted without stagger or dihedral. The single bays were defined by parallel pairs of inward leaning interplane struts, assisted by crossed flying and landing wires from the bases of the struts to the fuselage. Cabane struts supported the upper wing above the fuselage. The wings had thick, high lift coefficient sections, constructed around deep single spars built up from Duralumin sheet; the ribs were formed from cross-braced metal tubes. Ailerons were mounted only on the lower wing.

The fuselage was metal framed and fabric covered, with a straight edged, wire braced tailplane carrying divided elevators mounted on top. Its vertical tail was low and broad, with a curved leading edge; the rudder was deep and aerodynamically balanced. The Wib 2 was powered by a 600 hp (447 kW) water-cooled V-12 Renault 12 M engine completely enclosed within a smooth cowling and drove a two blade propeller. Small radiators projected out on either side of the cowling. The undercarriage was of the fixed conventional type, with the mainwheels on a rigid axle supported by V-struts and assisted by a tailskid.

The Wib 2 flew for the first time on 29 October 1921 but only one, in bomber configuration, was built.

== Specifications (BN.2) ==
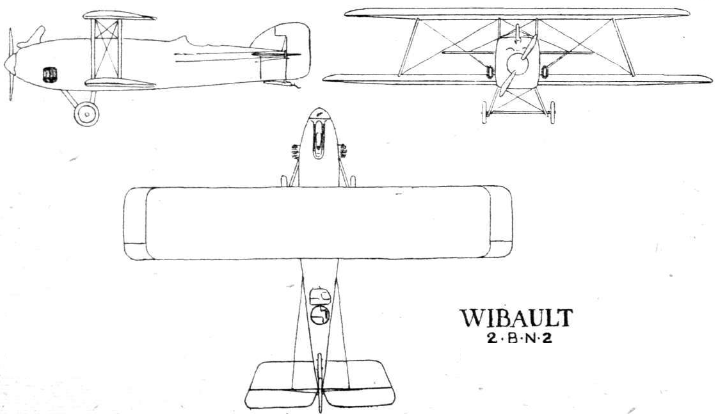
Wibault 2 Bn.2 night bomber

Data from Flight, 12 January 1922, Aviafrance

General characteristics

- Crew: Two, as a bomber; one as an airliner
- Capacity: 13 passengers as an airliner
- Length: 12.75 m (41 ft 10 in)
- Wingspan: 16.92 m (55 ft 6 in)
- Height: 5.00 m (16 ft 5 in)
- Wing area: 96.2 m^{2} (1,035 sq ft)
- Empty weight: 2,096 kg (4,620 lb)
- Gross weight: 4,286 kg (9,450 lb)
- Powerplant: 1 × Renault 12 Ma water-cooled V12, 450 kW (600 hp)
- Propellers: 2-bladed fixed pitch propeller

Performance

- Maximum speed: 201 km/h (125 mph, 109 kn) at 1,980 m (6,500 ft)
- Range: 600 km (370 mi, 320 nmi)
- Endurance: 4 hr at full throttle
- Service ceiling: 4,000 m (13,000 ft)
- Wing loading: 44.6 kg/m^{2} (9.13 lb/sq ft)
- Power/mass: 0.048 kW/m² (0.063 hp/lb)
