= HMS Simoom =

Six ships of the Royal Navy have borne the name HMS Simoom, after the desert wind, the Simoom:

- HMS Simoom was to have been a wooden paddle frigate, but she was renamed HMS Terrible in 1842, prior to being launched in 1845.
- HMS Simoom (1849) was an iron screw frigate launched in 1849. She was converted to a troopship in 1852 and was sold in 1887.
- HMS Simoom was previously HMS Monarch, an iron screw ship launched in 1868 and converted to a guardship in 1897, and a depot ship in 1904, when she was renamed HMS Simoom. She was sold in 1905.
- HMS Simoom (1916) was an R-class destroyer launched in 1916 and sunk in 1917.
- HMS Simoom (1918) was an S-class destroyer launched in 1918 and sold in 1931.
- HMS Simoom (P225) was an S-class submarine launched in 1942 and sunk in unknown circumstances in 1943.

== See also ==
- Simoom (disambiguation)
