= Wibault 8 Simoun =

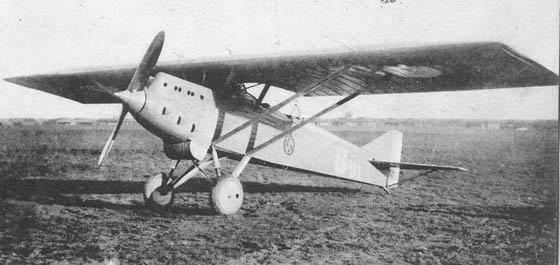
- 8C2

General information
- Type: Two seat fighter aircraft
- National origin: France
- Manufacturer: Avions Michel Wibault
- Designer: Michel Wibault
- Number built: 1

History
- First flight: May 1926

The Wibault 8 or Wib 8 Simoun (Simoon) was a tandem seat, parasol wing fighter aircraft designed and built in France to a 1925 specification which was later withdrawn; only one Wib 8 was completed.

== Design ==
The Wib 8 Simoun was designed around a 1925 specification from the Service Technique de l'Aéronautique (S.T.Aé, Technical Department of Aeronautics) for a two-seat fighter. Wibault's submission was one of a series of parasol wing aircraft, beginning with the Wibault Wib 3 and including the successful Wib 7. Along with the later Wib 12 and the single seat Wib 170, which also used the water-cooled upright V-12 500 hp (373 kW) Hispano-Suiza 12Hb engine, it was the most powerful of the group.

The design and construction of the Wib 8 was similar to that of the earlier aircraft. It was an all- metal machine, the structure mostly Duralumin and the covering narrow aluminium strips applied longitudinally. The parasol wing, built around box spars, was straight edged and of constant chord, braced to the lower fuselage with a pair of parallel struts on each side which met the wing at about mid-span. There were cabane struts over the fuselage and a trailing edge cut-out in the wing over the pilot's cockpit to enhance his visibility. A pair of synchronised 7.7 mm (0.303 in) Vickers machine guns fixed to the fuselage fired forwards through the propeller arc; in addition the rear cockpit was fitted with a pair of Lewis guns of the same calibre on a Scarff ring. The gunner also had auxiliary flight controls. A braced tailplane was mounted towards the top of the fuselage, together with an angular fin and rudder.

The Wib 8's engine was totally enclosed and drove a two blade propeller. The Mercedes was cooled by a retractable, half-cylindrical radiator on the fuselage underside at the back of the engine. Behind the engine the fuselage was flat sided, like that of the Wib 7. The fighter had a fixed conventional undercarriage with mainwheels on a split axle attached to the fuselage underside, supported by a pair of V-struts; there was a small tailskid.

It was flown for the first time in May 1926 but like other contenders for the contract it failed to meet the S.T.Aé's expectations. The two seat specification was then withdrawn and development of the sole Wib 8 ended.

== Specifications ==
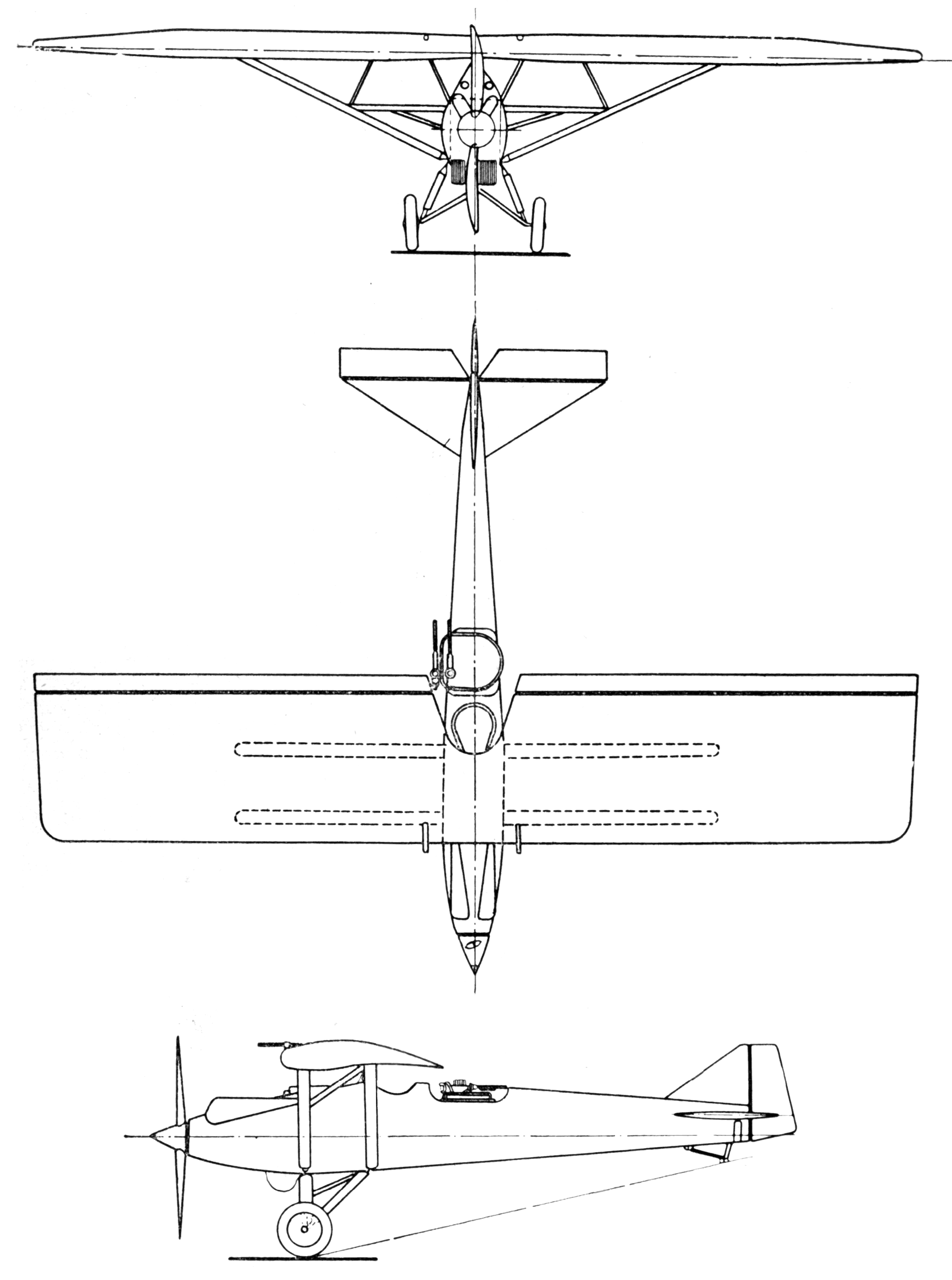
Wibault 8 C.2 3-view drawing from L'Air May 15,1928

Data from Green & Swanborough p.596

General characteristics

- Crew: Two
- Length: 8.95 m (29 ft 4 in)
- Wingspan: 12.63 m (41 ft 5 in)
- Height: 3.20 m (10 ft 6 in)
- Wing area: 29.60 m^{2} (318.6 sq ft)
- Empty weight: 1,233 kg (2,718 lb)
- Gross weight: 2,064 kg (4,550 lb)
- Powerplant: 1 × Hispano-Suiza 12Hb water-cooled upright V-12, 370 kW (500 hp)
- Propellers: 2-bladed

Performance

- Maximum speed: 236 km/h (147 mph, 127 kn) at 2,000 m (6,650 ft)
- Range: 600 km (370 mi, 320 nmi)
- Service ceiling: 7,000 m (23,000 ft)
- Time to altitude: 18.8 min to 5,000 m (16,405 ft)

Armament

- Forward firing guns: 2×7.7 mm (0.303 in) synchronised Vickers machine guns in fuselage, 2×7.7 mm (0.303 in) Darne machine guns in wings.
- Rear cockpit: 2×7.7 mm (0.303 in) Lewis guns on Scarff ring.
