= Vickers Wibault =

British fighter aircraft

Type 121
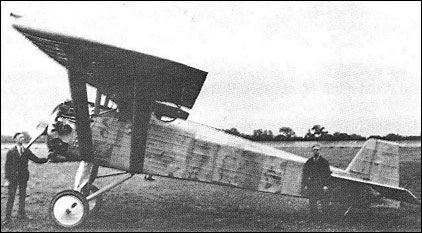

General information
- Type: Fighter
- Manufacturer: Vickers
- Primary user: Chile
- Number built: 26

History
- Introduction date: 1926
- First flight: 1926
- Retired: 1934
- Developed from: Wibault 7

The Vickers Type 121 Wibault Scout was a British fighter built by Vickers in the 1920s. It was a licensed version of the French Wibault 7 aircraft, with 26 being sold to Chile in 1926, where they served until 1934.

== Design and development ==
Vickers set up a partnership with the French aircraft manufacturer, Société des Avions Michel Wibault to exploit the patented system of all-metal construction developed by Michel Wibault. This used corrugated light alloy skin panels, and made for easy maintenance and inspection. As part of this partnership, Vickers placed an order with Wibault for a single Wibault 7, re-engined with a Bristol Jupiter VI radial engine, to act as a prototype for potential licensed production. The Wibault 7, and therefore the Vickers licensed copy, were single-engine high-wing parasol monoplanes.

The prototype, which differed from the standard Wibault 7 by having a new undercarriage and British instruments, was delivered to Britain in February 1926 and was later fitted by Vickers with strengthened wing struts. The durability of the aircraft's all-metal structure, together with promised good altitude performance, attracted the attention of the Chilean Military Air Service, which, after evaluating the prototype, placed an order for 26 aircraft, known as the Vickers Type 121, or Vickers-Wibault Scout.

The first Vickers built Type 121 flew at the end of June 1926, but crashed following an inverted spin on its first flight. This was found to be due to problems with the aircraft's centre of gravity, which were resolved by modifying the tailplane.

== Operational history ==
The first Type 121s were delivered to Chile in November 1926, partly equipping the Groupo Mixto de Aviación 1, with deliveries continuing until October 1927. Several were lost in accidents, with at least one losing its wing in flight, but it remained in service when the Chilean Air Force was formed from the air components of the Chilean Army and Navy, finally being retired in 1934.

== Operators ==
Chile

- Chilean Air Force

== Specifications (Type 121) ==
Data from The British Fighter since 1912

General characteristics

- Crew: 1
- Length: 23 ft 2 in (7.06 m)
- Wingspan: 36 ft 1 in (11.00 m)
- Height: 11 ft 6 in (3.51 m)
- Wing area: 237 sq ft (22.0 m^{2})
- Empty weight: 1,920 lb (871 kg)
- Gross weight: 2,970 lb (1,347 kg)
- Powerplant: 1 × Bristol Jupiter VI nine cylinder radial engine, 455 hp (339 kW)

Performance

- Maximum speed: 154 mph (248 km/h, 134 kn) at sea level; 144 mph (125 kn; 232 km/h) at 15,000 ft (4,600 m)
- Range: 300 mi (480 km, 260 nmi)
- Service ceiling: 23,000 ft (7,000 m)
- Time to altitude: 7 min 40 s to 10,000 ft (3,000 m)

Armament

- Guns: 2 × .303 in (7.7 mm) Vickers machine guns

== See also ==
Related development

- Wibault 7
