= Wibault 1 =

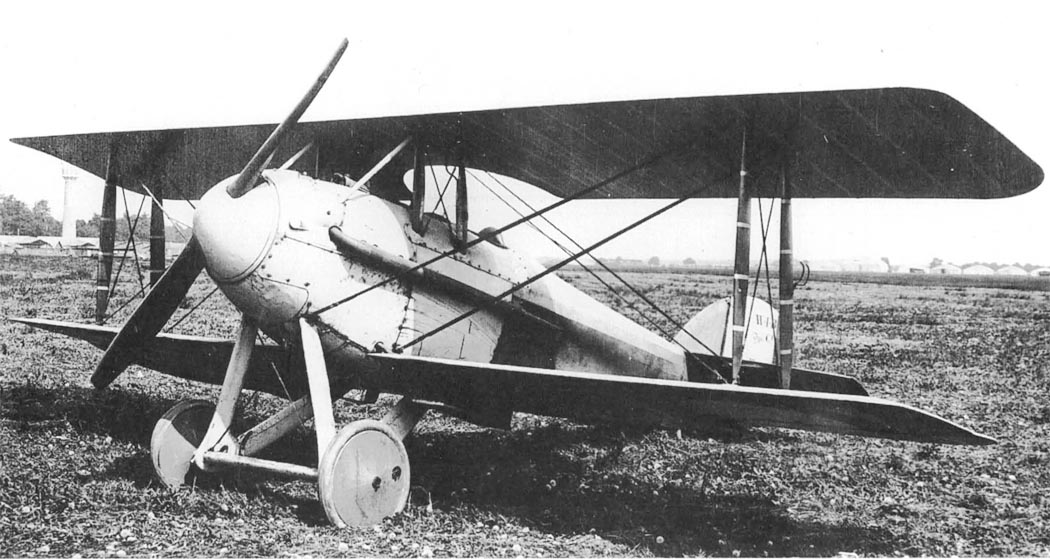

General information
- Type: Single seat fighter
- National origin: France
- Manufacturer: Niepce et Fetterer, Boulogne-Billancourt
- Designer: Michel Wibault
- Number built: 1

History
- First flight: early November 1918

The Wibault Wib 1, Wib C1 or, later, Wib 1 C1 was a French World War I single seat, single engine fighter aircraft prototype. Flown near the end of the war, it was not selected for production.

== Design and development ==
The Wib 1 was an aerodynamically clean single bay biplane, with square ended, constant chord unswept wings, mounted with slight stagger and braced with pairs of parallel interplane struts assisted by wires. It had short span, broad chord ailerons only on the lower wings. The fabric covered wings were metal framed like the rest of the aircraft. There was a rounded central cut-out in the trailing edge of the upper wing, under which the pilot sat in his open cockpit. The fuselage was rounded in cross-section and covered with light alloys panels over the engine and forward part, with fabric covering behind. A roughly elliptical plan, braced tailplane was attached to the top of the fuselage and carried split elevators with curved trailing edges. The fin was short and small but the rudder was broad in chord and extended down between the elevators to the keel; both fin and rudder had rounded edges.

The Wib 1 was powered by a 220 hp (164 kW) Hispano-Suiza 8B, a water-cooled, upright V8 engine. This was neatly housed under a smooth curved cowling behind a large, domed spinner and drove a two blade propeller. A pair of synchronised 7.7 mm (0.303 in) Vickers machine guns fired through the propeller arc. It had a fixed, conventional undercarriage with the mainwheels on a rigid axle attached to the lower fuselage by a pair of faired V-struts, together with a small tailskid.

The prototype flew for the first time early in November 1918, right at the end of World War I. The C1 designation was standard French military terminology for Chasseur (fighter), single seat. It went for official testing, in the hope of winning an Aviation Militaire contract, on 12 February 1919 and turned out to be fast, despite its relatively low engine power, because of its light construction and clean design. Though faster, it had a lower climb rate than its competitor, the Nieuport 29 with its 300 hp (224 kW) Hispano-Suiza 8 F engine and was heavier on the controls. The Nieuport was preferred for the contract and development of the Wib 1 ended.

== Specifications ==
Data from Green and Swanborough

General characteristics

- Crew: One
- Length: 6.30 m (20 ft 8 in)
- Wingspan: 7.80 m (25 ft 7 in)
- Height: 2.40 m (7 ft 10 in)
- Wing area: 21.85 m^{2} (235.2 sq ft)
- Gross weight: 896 kg (1,975 lb)
- Powerplant: 1 × Hispano-Suiza 8B upright, water-cooled V8, 160 kW (220 hp)
- Propellers: 2-bladed

Performance

- Maximum speed: 237 km/h (147 mph, 128 kn) at sea level; 206 km/h (128.0 mph; 111.2 kn) at 5,000 m (16,404 ft)
- Service ceiling: 7,000 m (23,000 ft)

Armament

- Guns: 2× synchronised 7.7 mm (0.303 in) Vickers machine guns
