= Wibault 9 =

Fighter aircraft

General information
- Type: Single seat fighter aircraft
- National origin: France
- Manufacturer: Avions Michel Wibault
- Number built: 1

The Wibault 9 or Wib 9 was a single seat, parasol wing fighter aircraft designed and built in France in the 1920s. It was a re-engined version of the relatively successful Wib 7, but failed to reach production.

== Design ==
The Wib 9 Simoun was a version of the Wib 7 with the latter's 480 hp (358 kW) 12-cylinder radial Gnome-Rhône 9Ad replaced by a 400 hp (298 kW) water-cooled V-12 Hispano-Suiza 12Jb engine. It was designed and built during the competitive trials held in Villacoublay in 1926–1927, after which the lowly placed Wib 7 won a small order of 25 machines. Originally known as the Wib 71, the Hispano powered version was not completed until after these trials were over, by which time it had been redesignated the Wib 9.

Apart from the engine installation and armament, the Wib 9 and Wib 7 were almost identical. They shared the same all-metal structure, mostly Duralumin covered with narrow aluminium strips applied longitudinally. The parasol wing was straight edged and of constant chord, braced to the lower fuselage with a pair of parallel struts on each side which met the wing at about mid-span. There were cabane struts over the fuselage and a trailing edge cut-out in the wing over the pilot's cockpit to enhance his visibility. The two designs shared the same flat sided fuselage and angular empennage, though the fin of the Wib 9 was noticeably broader. They shared similar split axle fixed conventional undercarriages. The dimensions were also the same apart from a 250 mm (10 in) increase in length resulting from the longer V-12 engine. Though the Wib 9 had both wing and fuselage mounted pairs of machine guns whereas the production Wib 7 had just the fuselage pair, a similar four gun arrangement had been trialled on the second prototype of the Wib 7.

The engine installation of the Wib 9 was different from that of the radial engined Wib 7 but close to that used on the Wib 8, another V-12 Hispano powered aircraft. The engine was totally enclosed within a cowling which clearly followed the contours of the two cylinder banks and was cooled by a retractable, half-cylindrical radiator on the fuselage underside at the back of the engine. A two-bladed propeller was fitted, as on all the Wibault parasol fighters. As well as being longer, the water-cooled V-12 was inevitably heavier than the air-cooled radial so the Wib 9 had an empty weight 90 kg (198 lb) greater than the Wib 7, but with the fuel load reduced by 16% the loaded weights only differed by 37 kg (82 lb).

The Wib 9 was flown for the first time no earlier than mid-1926. Limited flight trials suggested it was a little faster than the Wib 7 but no production contract followed and development was soon ended. Only one was built.

== Specifications ==
Data from Green & Swanborough p.596

General characteristics

- Crew: One
- Length: 8.20 m (26 ft 11 in)
- Wingspan: 11.00 m (36 ft 1 in)
- Height: 2.90 m (9 ft 6 in)
- Wing area: 22.00 m^{2} (236.8 sq ft)
- Empty weight: 917 kg (2,022 lb)
- Gross weight: 1,481 kg (3,265 lb)
- Powerplant: 1 × Hispano-Suiza 12Jb water-cooled upright V-12, 300 kW (400 hp)
- Propellers: 2-bladed

Performance

- Maximum speed: 243 km/h (151 mph, 131 kn)
- Range: 600 km (370 mi, 320 nmi)
- Service ceiling: 7,100 m (23,300 ft)
- Time to altitude: 12 min 33 s to 4,000 m (13,123 ft)

Armament

- Wing guns: 2×7.7 mm (0.303 in) unsynchronised Darne machine guns firing outside the propeller arc.
- Fuselage guns 2×7.7 mm (0.303 in) synchronised Vickers machine guns firing through the propeller arc.
