= Wibault 7 =

French monoplane fighter

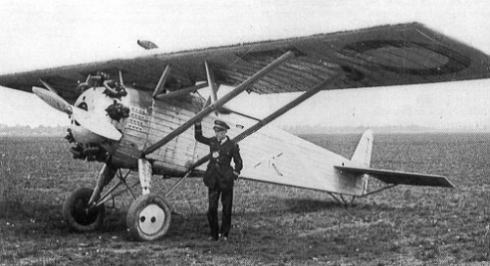
- Wibault 74

General information
- Type: Monoplane fighter
- National origin: France
- Manufacturer: Wibault
- Designer: Michel Wibault
- Primary user: Aéronautique Militaire

History
- Introduction date: 1929
- First flight: 1924
- Variant: Vickers Wibault

The Wibault 7 was a 1920s French monoplane fighter designed and built by Société des Avions Michel Wibault. Variants were operated by the French and Polish military and built under licence for Chile as the Vickers Wibault.

== Development ==
Developed from the earlier Wib.3 the Wibault 7 was a C.I category single-seat high-wing braced parasol monoplane fighter powered by a 480 hp (360 kW) Gnome-Rhone 9Ad radial engine. The main difference from earlier aircraft was the use of an all-metal construction system which was patented by Wibault. The first prototype flew in 1924, and was followed by two more prototypes. Despite being placed only third in the competition (behind the Nieuport-Delage NiD 42 and the Gourdou-Leseurre GL.32), an order for 25 Wib.7s was placed in January 1927. These were followed in production by 60 aircraft for the Aéronautique Militaire as the Wib.72 which entered service in 1929. 26 Wib.7s were built for Chile under licence by Vickers in England.

Plans to sell the aircraft to Poland did not come about, but the PZL company bought a licence and manufactured 25 aircraft with Bristol Jupiter engines, designated in Poland as Wibault 70C1, to the Polish military. One or two of them were fitted with Wright Cyclone engine. The next variant was the Wib.73, with seven built for Paraguay. The French Navy bought some carrier-capable Wib.74s with a strengthened fuselage and arrestor hook.

== Variants ==
Wib.7
Prototype powered by a 480 hp (358 kW) Gnome-Rhone 9Ad radial engine. Two further prototypes followed by 25 production aircraft.
Wib.71

Re-engined with a 400 hp (298 kW) Hispano 12 Jb engine but redesignated Wib.9 before completion.

Wib.72
Strengthened production aircraft for French Air Force and Poland. 85 built.
Wib.73
Production aircraft for Poland and Paraguay powered by 336 kW (451 hp) Lorraine-Dietrich 12Eb W engine. 11 built .
Wib.74
Production navalised aircraft for the French Navy. 18 built.
Vickers Wibault Scout
Licensed production with a Bristol Jupiter engine for Chile, 26 built.
Wibault 70C1
Licensed production with a Bristol Jupiter engine for Poland, 25 built by PZL

== Operators ==
Chile

- Chilean Air Force

France

- Aéronautique Militaire
- French Navy

Paraguay

- Paraguayan Air Force received 7 Wib.73s. Three remained in service at the outbreak of the Chaco War between Paraguay and Bolivia.

Poland

- Polish Air Force

== Specifications (Wib 7) ==
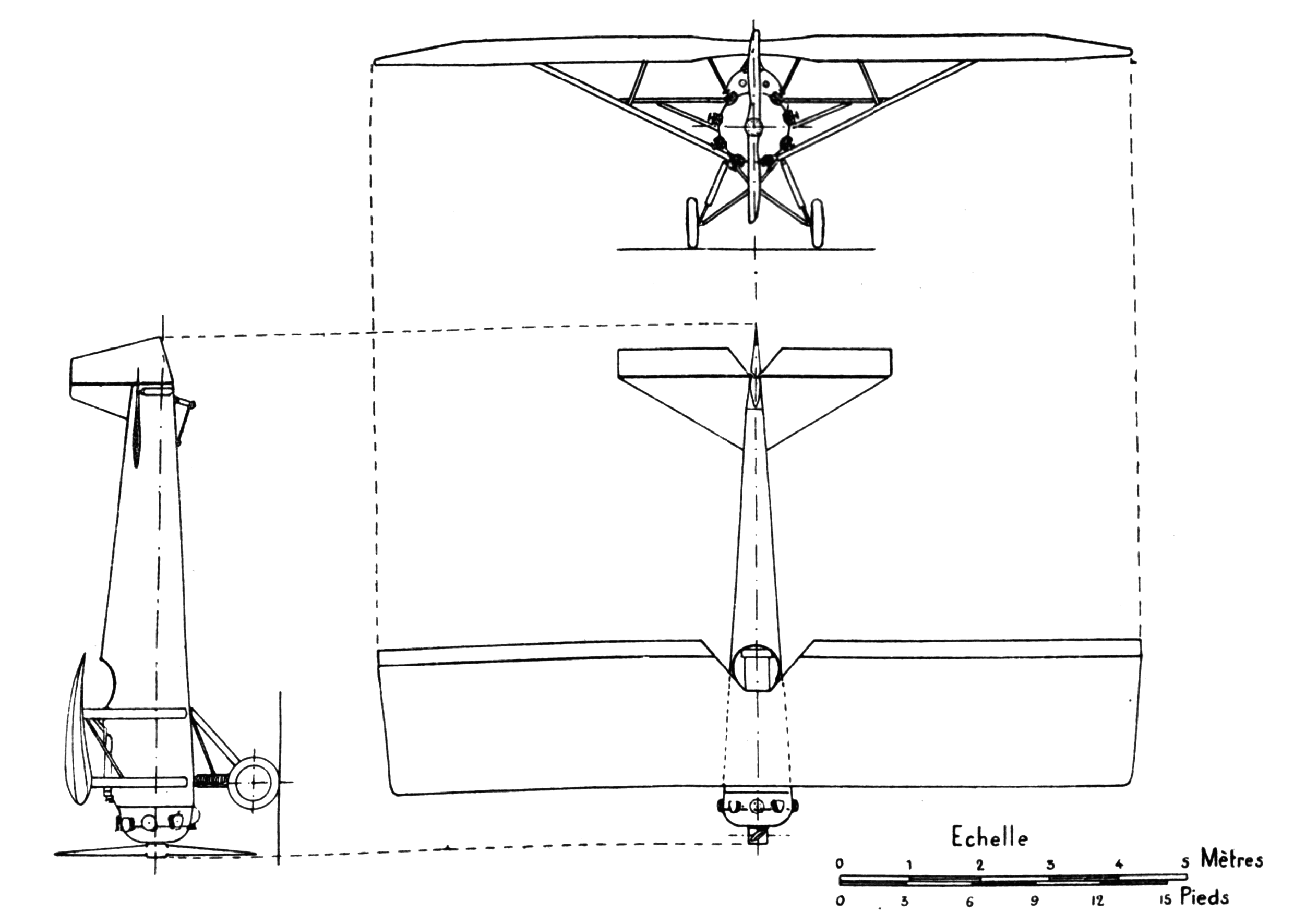
Wibault 7 C1 3-view drawing from L'Aéronautique April,1927

Data from The Complete Book of Fighters

General characteristics

- Crew: one
- Length: 7.45 m (24 ft 5.33 in)
- Wingspan: 11.00 m (36 ft 1.13 in)
- Height: 2.90 m (9 ft 6.13 in)
- Wing area: 22.0 m^{2} (236.8 sq ft)
- Empty weight: 827 kg (1,823 lb)
- Gross weight: 1,444 kg (3,183 lb)
- Powerplant: 1 × Gnome et Rhône 9Ac , 313 kW (420 hp)

Performance

- Maximum speed: 227 km/h (141 mph, 123 kn)
- Range: 600 km (373 mi, 324 nmi)
- Service ceiling: 8,500 m (27,900 ft)
- Rate of climb: 5.4 m/s (1,070 ft/min)

Armament

- 2x 7.7 mm Vickers machine guns

== See also ==
- Aerial operations in the Chaco War

Related development

- Vickers Wibault

Related lists

- List of Interwar military aircraft
