= Michel Wibault =

French aircraft designer and inventor

- Born: 5 June 1897; Douai, France
- Died: 23 January 1963 (aged 65); Paris. France
- Occupations: aircraft designer and aeronautical inventor

Michel Henri Marie Joseph Wibault (5 June 1897 – 23 January 1963) was a French aircraft designer. He was a strong advocate of metal construction, and his airliners were important in the development of French commercial aviation in the 1930s. He is especially known for his invention of vectored thrust for aircraft, which led to the development of the V/STOL Hawker Siddeley Harrier.

== Early life ==
Michel Wibault was born in Douai, near Lille, France, on 5 June 1897 to Achille and Madelaine Wibault. Achille owned a chain of about a hundred grocery shops. They had three sons and three daughters.

At the age of four, Michel was disabled by polio affecting all his limbs. As a result, he did not attend school, and was entirely home- and self-educated. He also had a German nanny. His disability precluded him from military service. During his childhood he often visited La Brayelle Airfield, where the world's first aviation meeting took place. It was home to the workshops of Louis Breguet whom he met and with whom he later formed a lasting acquaintance.

In August 1914, Douai was captured by the Germans, and German officers occupied the family mansion. Michel made visits to the occupied La Brayelle airfield. The Germans took little notice of the disabled young man and, understanding German, he was able to observe the activities and take extensive notes. He also met Anthony Fokker, who was staying with family friends while demonstrating his designs to the Germans. Michel built his own wind tunnel for testing models. Disliking the Germans, he was able to move to Belgium and then to Switzerland where he developed his ideas.

== Aircraft development ==
In March 1917 Wibault presented a fighter design to Lieutenant-Colonel Émile Dorand, Director of the Technical Section of Military Aeronautics (STAé) in Paris, and with financial assistance from his maternal uncle, made in December 1917, built a model which was successfully tested in the Eiffel aerodynamic laboratory.

With French engineer Paul Boccaccio, in 1918 he designed and built his first aeroplane, the Wibault-Boccaccio & Cie C.1 fighter powered by a 220 hp Hispano-Suiza engine. Tests were very successful, achieving a top speed of 237 km/h and an altitude of 7,500m, but development was abandoned at the end of the war.

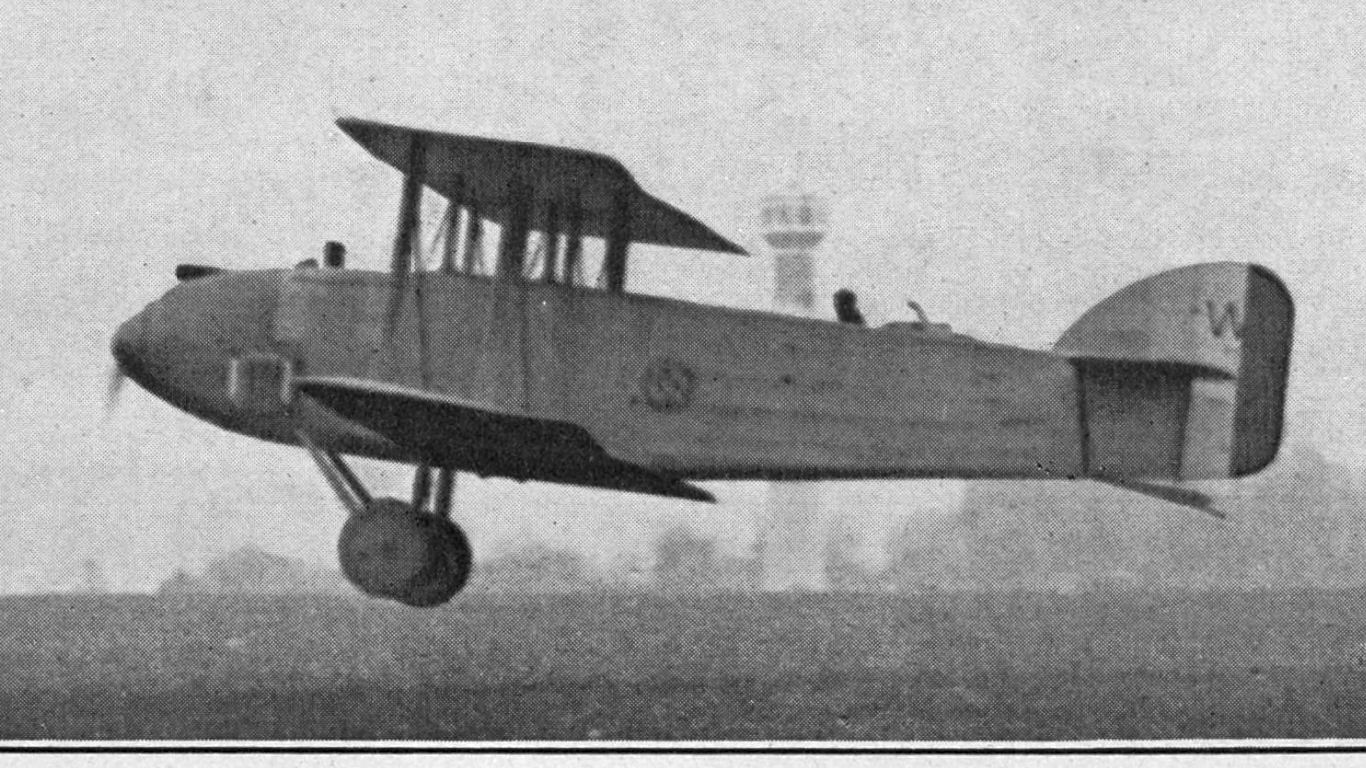
The company's first aircraft, the Wibault 2 night bomber – only one built

In 1919 Wibault founded Société des Avions Michel Wibault at Billancourt, with various aircraft, mostly parasol monoplanes of Duralumin construction, flying from 1920. At first the aircraft were all military types, with Wibault turning to civil transports from 1930.

Wibault became a consulting engineer for Vickers, starting in 1922. As a pioneer of metal construction for which he held patents, he closely followed the design methods of Hugo Junkers and Caudius Dornier. Wibault and Vickers jointly developed more metal construction patents. By 1925 Vickers had adopted Wibault’s construction methods, and produced the Vickers Wibault Scout (based on the Wibault 7) – 26 of which were bought by the Chilean Air Force – the Vickers Vireo and Jockey fighters, and the Viastra, Vellore and Vellox civil transports.

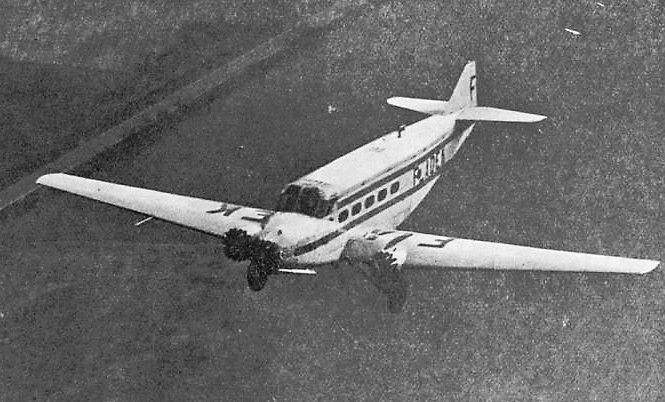
Wibault-Penhoët 281T F-ADEK, the prototype 280T with Hispano-Wright engines replaced by Gnome-Rhônes

In 1930 French shipbuilders Penhoët (Chantiers St. Nazaire) funded construction of the Wibault-Penhoët 280-T low-wing trimotor transport. This was the first of a series of airliners that was vitally important to the development of commercial aviation in France in the 1930s. The collaboration was successful, with Penhoët merging with Wibault in 1931, forming the Chantiers Aeronautiques Wibault-Penhoët. Then in 1934 Wibault-Penhoët itself was sold to Breguet, which went on to produce several Wibault designs.

In 1937 the French Air Ministry awarded Wibault a contract for a large four-engined double-deck airliner carrying up to 72 passengers. An early version, carrying 25 passengers in some luxury, including a lower deck bar and restaurant was named the Air-Wibault 1.00. The prototype was completed, but only three engines could be obtained, and it was destroyed in an air raid on the Arsenal works at Villacoublay on 3 June 1940. It is said that Wibault himself set fire to it to stop it falling into German hands.

On 17 June 1940 Wibault escaped with his wife Marie-Rose from Paris to London where Charles de Gaulle appointed him as technical director of France Forever, a support organisation for de Gaulle in the USA, and he was very active in the group. Moving to America, Wibault joined Republic Aviation where he worked with the company’s major driving force and chief designer Alexander Kartveli. Kartveli, a Soviet émigré, had trained at an aviation school in Paris and then worked for Louis Bleriot, and for the Wibault company, leaving for America in 1927, and was a strong proponent of metal construction methods. For Republic, Wibault worked on the design of the XF-12 Rainbow, and the RC-3 Seabee.

== VTOL development ==
While in New York in 1940, Wibault met Winthrop Rockefeller, the billionaire politician and philanthropist, who was to finance Wibault for the rest of his career, mainly through an entity called the Vibrane Corporation which supported him and sponsored his US patent applications. After the war, Wibault divided his time between New York and Paris. He became increasingly interested in vertical take-off and landing (VTOL) aircraft, with projects ranging from interceptors to large airliners, most of which he classified as a “Gyropter” (French – “Gyroptère”). His starting point was a circular aircraft comparable to the Avro Canada VZ-9 Avrocar.

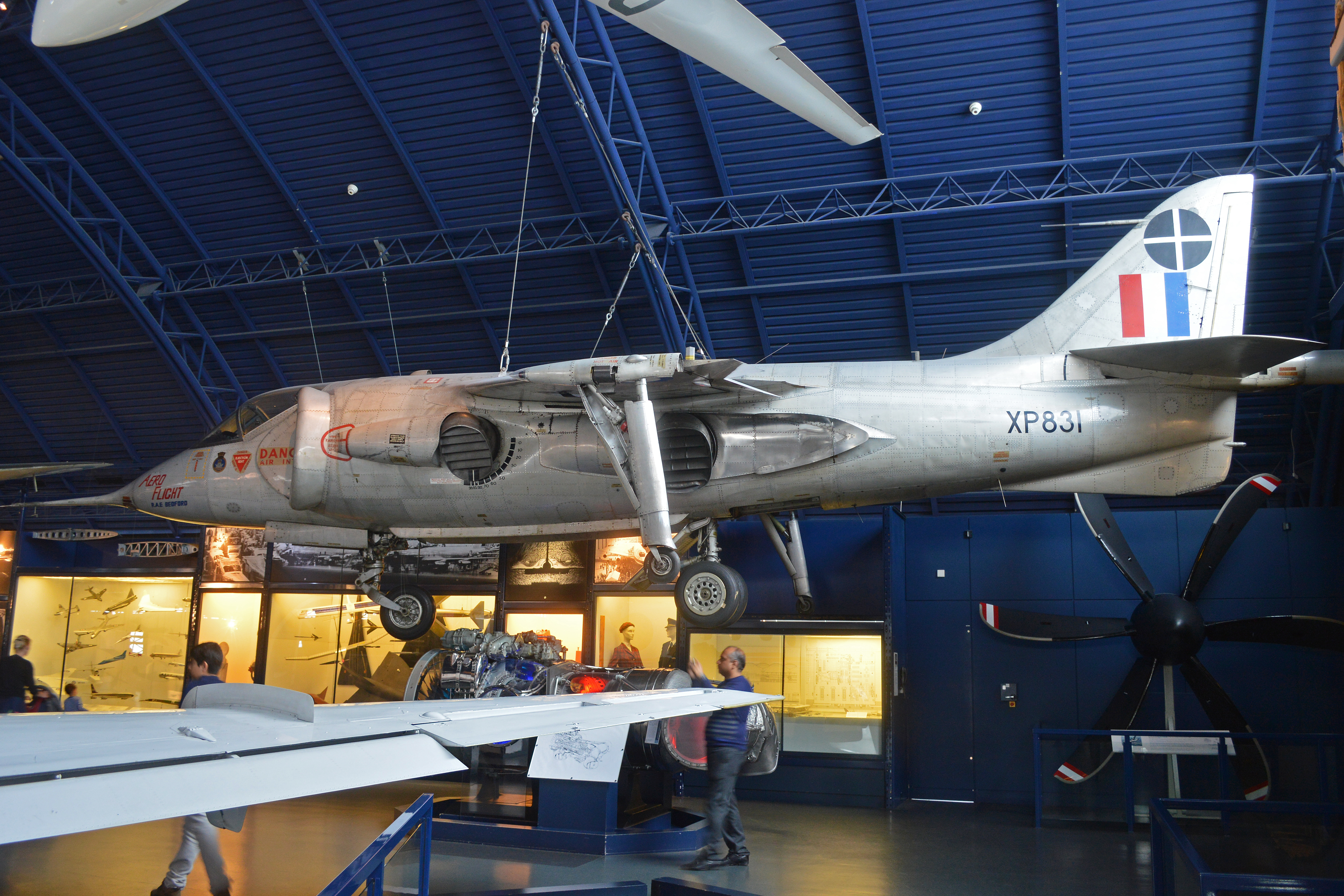
The first prototype Hawker P.1127 XP831 which made its first vertical take-off on 21 October 1960, over two years before Wibault's death

In 1954, one of his projects was for a vertical take-off and landing ground-attack Gyropter using the most powerful turboshaft engine then available, a Bristol Orion, driving four centrifugal compressors mounted on the sides of the airframe around the centre of gravity. The compressor outlet nozzles were able to swivel between pointing straight down for take-off and landing, and pointing horizontally backwards for forward flight. He obtained patents for his vectored thrust design.

Unable to interest the French government or industry in the idea, in 1955 Wibault submitted it to the NATO Mutual Weapons Development Programme and was subsequently introduced to Stanley Hooker who was then technical director of Bristol Engines. Soon Wibault agreed to work with Bristol, and they worked to lighten and simplify the engine design, leading to a new patent in 1957, jointly authored by Michel Wibault and Hooker’s assistant, Gordon Lewis.

Meanwhile, Hawker’s chief designer Sidney Camm, noting the success of the Ryan X-13 Vertijet, had developed an interest in VTOL aircraft, which he expressed in a letter to Hooker, and thus the scene was set for the development of the Bristol Siddeley Pegasus engine. This was at the heart of the Hawker P.1127 design that evolved into the Hawker Siddeley Harrier.

== Personal life ==
In March 1930 he married Marie-Rose Boistel. In 1931 he was appointed a Chevalier of the Legion of Honour. He died in the 16th arrondissement of Paris on 23 January 1963.

== See also ==
- Société des Avions Michel Wibault (includes list of designs)
