= Air France accidents and incidents =

Air France has been in operation since 1933. Its aircraft have been involved in a number of major accidents and incidents. The deadliest accident of the airline occurred on June 1, 2009, when Air France Flight 447, an Airbus A330-203, flying from Rio de Janeiro to Paris crashed into the Atlantic Ocean with 228 fatalities. A selected list of the most noteworthy of these events is given below.

== 1930s ==
Date	Aircraft type	Registration	Route	Location of crash site	Passenger / crew / total	Dead / injured	Cause of crash	Notes
15 January 1934	Dewoitine D.332	F-AMMY	Saigon–Paris	Corbigny, France	7 / 3 / 10	10 / 0	Crashed, possibly due to icing, after flying into a snowstorm	Named Emeraude
9 May 1934	Wibault 282T-12	F-AMHP	Le Bourget–Croydon	English Channel off Dungeness, Kent, United Kingdom	3 / 3 / 6	6 / 0	Undetermined	Some debris and a body found on the French coast on 18 May
19 May 1934	Wibault 282.T12	F-AMHL	Le Bourget–Croydon	Croydon Airport, Surrey, United Kingdom	? / ? / 10	0 / 1	Fuel exhaustion	
31 May 1934	Lioré et Olivier LeO 213	F-AIVG	Croydon–Paris	Croydon	0 / 2 / 2	2 / 0	Struck a radio mast shortly after takeoff	
5 August 1934	Latécoère 26-2R	F-AILK	Unknown	Near Bahia, Brazil	0 / 2 / 2	2 / 0	Loss of control on takeoff for reasons unknown	
1 April 1935	Farman F.306	F-ALHQ	Paris–Croydon	Brémontier-Merval	1 / 2 / 3	1 / 0	Loss of control	
2 November 1935	Latécoère 28-1	F-AJIQ	Santiago de Chile–Paris	Off Aracaju, Brazil	0 / 4 / 4	4 / 0	Crashed at sea for reasons unknown	Wreckage and bodies found a day later
11 November 1935	Latécoère 28-1	F-AJPB	Marseille–Barcelona	Near Istres, France	0 / 3 / 3	3 / 0	Crashed while flying in a thunderstorm	
21 January 1936	CAMS 53/1	F-AJIR	Marseille–Tunis	Corsica	3 / 3 / 6	6 / 0	Loss of control following engine failure	
10 February 1936	Latécoère 301	F-AOIK	Paris–Rio de Janeiro	Atlantic Ocean	1 / 5 / 6	6 / 0	Disappeared after messaging that they were flying in a storm	Named Ville de Buenos Aires
8 May 1936	Lioré et Olivier LeO H-242	F-ANQG	Marseille–Algiers	Mediterranean Sea	4 / 4 / 8	1 / 0	Ditched after all four engines failed due to fuel starvation	Named Ville de Nice
2 August 1936	Wibault 283.T12	F-ANBL	Paris–Toulouse–Dakar–Natal–Rio de Janeiro	Albine, Tarn	0 / 3 / 3	3 / 0	CFIT	Named L'Aventureux
7 December 1936	Latécoère 300	F-AKGF	Marseille–Rio de Janeiro	Atlantic Ocean	0 / 5 / 5	5 / 0	Disappeared after pilot messaged "we have switched off the right rear engine"	Named Croix du Sud Aviator Jean Mermoz was on board
27 October 1937	Dewoitine D.333	F-ANQA	Dakar–Toulouse	Off El Jadida, Morocco	3 / 3 / 6	6 / 0	Disappeared over the Atlantic after sending an SOS	Named Antares Only two mail bags recovered on beaches in Morocco
8 December 1937	Potez 621	F-AOTZ	Paris–Marseille	Near Saillans, France	4 / 3 / 7	2 / 5	Poor visibility, CFIT	Named L'Épervier
24 December 1937	Wibault 280	F-AMYD	Bucharest–Vienna–Prague	Near Zhůří, Rejštejn, Czechoslovakia	1 / 2 / 3	3 / 0	CFIT, navigation error	
9 February 1938	Lioré et Olivier H.242/1	F-ANPB	Marseille–Tunis	Etang de Berre	9 / 5 / 14	7 / 0	Struck breakwater in fog	Named Ville de Bone
7 March 1938	Potez 62/1	F-ANQR	Hanoi–Paris	[Datia, near Jhansi], India	3 / 4 / 7	7 / 0	Crashed and burst into flames shortly after takeoff	Named La Tapageuse Burials at Jhansi Cantonment Cemetery
23 March 1938	Dewoitine D.338	F-AQBB	Dakar–Toulouse	Pyrenees Mountains	3 / 5 / 8	8 / 8	CFIT	
27 January 1939	Potez 62	F-ANPJ	Paris–Berlin	Near Butzweilerhof Airfield, Germany	2 / 4 / 6	6 / 0	Struck a chimney in fog	Named Courlis
3 April 1939	Caudron Simoun	F-AOOT	Unknown	Mountain near Marrakech, Morocco	? / ? / 9	9 / 0	CFIT	
2 May 1939	Dewoitine D.338	F-ARIC	Dakar–Casablanca–Paris	Near Argana, Morocco	6 / 3 / 9	9 / 0	Icing, loss of control	

== 1940s ==
Date	Aircraft type	Registration	Route	Location of crash site	Passenger / crew / total	Dead / injured	Cause of crash	Notes
3 March 1940	Bloch MB.220	F-AOHA	Paris–Marseille	near Orange, France	0 / 3 / 3	3 / 0	CFIT in bad weather due to a navigation error	
20 June 1940	Dewoitine D.338	F-ARTD	Unknown	near Ouistreham	0 / 3 / 3	1 / 0	Accidental shootdown	
7 July 1940	Dewoitine D.338	F-AQBA	Unknown	Gulf of Tonkin	0 / 4 / 4	4 / 0	Shot down by Japanese fighter	
10 October 1940	Dewoitine D.338	F-AQBJ	Niamey–Cotonou	Carnotville, Benin	0 / 3 / 3	3 / 0	CFIT in poor weather	
27 November 1940	SNCAC NC.223.4	F-AROA	Marseille–Damascus	Mediterranean Sea	5 / 2 / 7	7 / 0	Shot down after flying into the battle zone off Cape Spartivento (likely)	named Le Verrier
1 September 1941	Bloch MB.220	F-AQNL	Marseille–Toulouse	Bollemont	14 / 3 / 17	15 / 2	Engine failure during takeoff	
13 August 1942	Lioré et Olivier H-246.1	F-AREJ	Marseille–Algiers	Algiers	4 / 6 / 10	4 / 0	Attacked by RAF Hawker Hurricane fighters, sank after landing	named Mauritanie
27 September 1942	Dewoitine D.342	F-ARIZ	Paris–Dakar	Ameur-el-Aïn, Algeria	18 / 7 / 25	25 / 0	Loss of control after takeoff for reasons unknown; possible bombing	
13 January 1943	Lockheed 14H2 Super Electra	F-ARRF	Dakar–Algiers	Aguelhok, Mali	0 / 3 / 3	3 / 0	Engine failure	
23 August 1945	Lockheed Lodestar	F-ARTK	Unknown	off Algiers	3 / 4 / 7	7 / 0	Loss of control, crashed at sea for reasons unknown	Wreckage never recovered
10 September 1945	Amiot AAC.1	F-BAJP	Unknown	Le Bourget Airport	Unknown	Unknown	Written off	
31 October 1945	Latécoère 631	F-BANT	Unknown	Laguna de Rocha, Uruguay	2+ / ? / 2+	2 / ?	Propeller separation, fuselage penetration	
10 November 1945	Amiot AAC.1	F-BANO	Unknown	Le Bourget Airport	Unknown	Unknown	Written off	
23 November 1945	Amiot AAC.1	F-BAKL	Unknown	Toulouse	Unknown	Unknown	Written off	
25 December 1945	Lockheed C-60A Lodestar	F-BALV	Paris–Fort Lamy–Bangui–Antananarivo	near Bangui	5 / 3 / 8	8 / 0	Loss of control	Prince Vinh San of Vietnam killed Aircraft leased from the Ministry of Air
13 January 1946	Amiot AAC.1	F-BANP	Paris–Bordeaux	Le Bouscat, Bordeaux, France	0 / 2 / 2	2 / 0	Struck a church steeple	
29 June 1946	Amiot AAC.1	F-BAJS	Paris–Pau	near Pau	0 / 3 / 3	2 / 0	Struck power lines on approach	
8 August 1946	Amiot AAC.1	F-BAJT	Unknown	Le Bourget Airport	Unknown	Unknown	Written off	
3 September 1946	Douglas DC-3A	F-BAOB	Copenhagen–Paris	Køge, Denmark	17 / 5 / 22	22 / 0	Engine fire caused by fuel leak, CFIT	
4 September 1946	Douglas DC-3D	F-BAXD	Paris–London	near Le Bourget Airport	21 / 5 / 26	20 / 6	Unexplained loss of power resulting in loss of altitude on takeoff	Killed Air France's first flight attendant, Paulette Vavasseur; one person also died on the ground; amongst the survivors was the English actor John Slater and his wife Betty
1 February 1947	Douglas C-47A	F-BAXQ	Paris–Bordeaux–Lisbon	Serra de Sintra	11 / 5 / 16	15 / ?	CFIT	
5 March 1947	Amiot AAC.1	F-BAKP	Unknown	Le Bourget Airport	Unknown	Unknown	Written off	
14 March 1947	Douglas C-47A	F-BAXO	Nice–Lyon–Paris	Mont Moucherolle	18 / 5 / 23	23 / 0	Possible navigation error, CFIT	
4 June 1947	Amiot AAC.1	F-BANB	Nice–Marseille–Lyon–Paris	Gèmenos, France	3 / 0 / 3	3 / 0	ADF failure, CFIT	
7 June 1947	Amiot AAC.1	F-BAKV	Unknown	Yoff Airport	Unknown	Unknown	Written off	
1 July 1947	Amiot AAC.1	F-BALF (AF612)	Bangui–Yaounde–Douala	Eséka, Cameroon	10 / 3 / 13	13 / 0	CFIT	
4 October 1947	Amiot AAC.1	F-BAJB	Unknown	Pau, France	Unknown	Unknown	Written off	
7 October 1947	SNCASE SE.161/P7 Languedoc	F-BATY	Bône–Paris	Bône (now Annaba), Algeria	? / ? / ?	0 / ?	Landing gear failure, overran and crashed on takeoff	
6 January 1948	Douglas DC-3D	F-BAXC (AF122)	Brussels–Paris	near Gonesse	11 / 5 / 16	16 / 0	Possible stall on approach	
26 January 1948	SNCASE SE.161/P7 Languedoc	F-BCUC	None	Romainville, Paris	0 / 9 / 9	9 / 0	Loss of control	
4 February 1948	SNCASE SE.161/P7 Languedoc	F-BATK	Unknown	Marignane Airport	Unknown	Unknown	Written off	
10 February 1948	SNCASE SE.161/P7 Languedoc	F-BATH	Unknown	Orly Airport	Unknown	Unknown	Written off	
10 April 1948	Douglas DC-4-1009	F-BBDC	Lagos–Kano–Algiers–Paris	Kano Airport	0 / 6 / 6	1 / ?	Locked nosewheel, runway excursion	
14 June 1948	SNCASE SE.161/P7 Languedoc	F-BATG	None	Coulommiers Airport	? / ? / 9	0 / 0	Caught fire during refueling, burned out	
23 November 1948	SNCASE SE.161/P7 Languedoc	F-BATM	None	Montaudran Airport	0 / 5 / 5	1 / ?	Maintenance error, loss of control on takeoff	
29 August 1948	SNCASE SE.161/P7 Languedoc	F-BATO	None	Le Bourget Airport	? / ? / ?	0 / ?	Caught fire in hangar, burned out	
9 April 1949	SNCASE SE.161/P7 Languedoc	F-BATU	Paris–Nice	Nice Airport	30 / 5 / 35	0 / 0	Runway overrun	
28 November 1949	Douglas C-54A	F-BELO	Paris–Lyon–Tunis	near Saint-Just-Chaleyssin	33 / 5 / 38	5 / 0	Pilot error, CFIT	

== 1950s ==
22 January 1950
A Douglas DC-4-1009 (F-BBDB) burned out during maintenance at Orly Airport. During work on an engine, an inspection lamp fell in some parts Yuperd made it happen. Some parts and the tail went to the Centre d'Instruction de Vilgenis (CIV) while the nose section was used to repair a C-54 (F-BBDD) that was damaged by a SNCASE Languedoc in 1952.
16 February 1950
An Air France Douglas DC-3A (F-BAOD) overran the runway on landing at Cotonou Airport; there were no casualties.
12 and 14 June 1950
Two Air France Douglas DC-4s (F-BBDF and F-BBDM, respectively) crashed into the sea off Bahrain while landing, with a combined loss of 86 lives. The first accident claimed the lives of 40 of the 53 occupants and the second 46 out of 52. Both aircraft had operated the Karachi, Pakistan, to Bahrain portion of Air France's Saigon, Indochina – Paris sector. The accident investigators concluded that the pilot in command did not maintain his correct altitude until the runway lights became visible during the approach to Bahrain in the first accident, and that the pilot in command did not keep an accurate check of his altitude and rate of descent during the approach procedure in the second accident. In 1994, the wreckage of F-BBDM was found on the seabed. A subsequent re-investigation ruled out pilot error, sabotage and mechanical failure. Using contemporary weather reports archived in the UK, it was determined that extreme weather, now known as microbursts, brought down both DC-4s. The report was relayed to France via its embassy in Bahrain with the recommendation that the pilots be exonerated due to conditions unknown at the time and beyond their capability to counteract.
30 July 1950
A SNCASE SE.161/P7 Languedoc (F-BCUI) was written off when its undercarriage collapsed on landing at Marignane Airport, Marseille; all 31 on board survived.
3 February 1951
A Douglas DC-4-1009 (F-BBDO, named Ciel de Savoie) operating Air France's Douala, Cameroon, to Niamey, Niger, sector hit the 13,354 feet high Cameroon Mountain near Bouea, Cameroon, west of Douala, at a height of 8,500 feet (2,600 m). The aircraft was destroyed, killing all 29 occupants. The mountain was probably only partially visible from the flight deck due to the mist surrounding it. Although the pilot immediately turned to the left, the plane hit the steeply rising terrain with its left wing. The accident investigators concluded that the crew followed an inaccurate procedure and relied on imprecise navigation. The investigators furthermore determined that the crew did not check the draft [sic]. Moreover, they cited the crew's error of judgement and over-confidence when flying over the mountain mass as additional contributory factors.
11 August 1951
An Air France Douglas DC-3D (F-BAXB) broke up in mid-air and crashed at Moisville during a training flight out of Le Bourget Airport, killing the five crew.
2 January 1952
An Amiot AAC.1 (F-BAMQ) crashed at Andapa, Madagascar, killing 6 of 11 on board.
3 March 1952
A SNCASE SE.161/P7 Languedoc (F-BCUM) operating a passenger flight from Nice Le Var Airport to Paris Le Bourget Airport crashed shortly after take-off with the loss of all 38 lives on board. Soon after takeoff from Le Var Airport, the aircraft began banking to the left. This increased progressively until the aircraft flipped over on its back and crashed. The accident investigators attributed the accident to the aircraft's blocked ailerons to the left, as a result of a mechanical fault related to the design.
7 April 1952
A SNCASE SE.161/P7 Languedoc (F-BATB) was damaged beyond economic repair when it overran the runway on take-off from Le Bourget Airport, Paris. All 23 on board survived; the aircraft was operating an international scheduled passenger flight from Le Bourget to Heathrow Airport, London.
29 April 1952
A Douglas DC-4 (F-BELI) operating a German internal service from Frankfurt Rhein-Main Airport to Berlin Tempelhof Airport came under attack from two Soviet MiG-15 fighters while passing through one of the Allied air corridors over East Germany. Although the attack had severely damaged the aircraft, necessitating the shutdown of engines three and four, the pilot landed it safely at West Berlin's Tempelhof Airport, where an inspection revealed that it had been hit by 89 shots fired from the Soviet MiGs during the air attack. There were no fatalities among the 17 occupants (six crew, eleven passengers). Russian authorities that the DC-4 was outside the air corridor at the time of the attack.
10 April 1953
An Amiot AAC.1 (F-BALE) crashed on takeoff from Miandrivazo Airport, Madagascar due to double engine failure, killing 4 of 15 on board.
3 August 1953
Air France Flight 152, a Lockheed L-749A Constellation (F-BAZS), ditched 6 miles from Fetiye Point, Turkey, 1.5 miles offshore into the Mediterranean Sea on a flight between Rome and Beirut. Violent vibrations following an unexplained fracture of a propeller blade caused engine number three to break away, and control of engine number four was also lost. Vibrations continued with loss of altitude. The crew of eight and all but four of the 34 passengers were rescued. In 2013 an engine was found, but not the airliner itself. The Turkish Navy rediscovered the nearly intact aircraft in 2018 in 842 feet of water. Following this accident, liferafts were mandated on all flights.
1 September 1953
Air France Flight 178, a Lockheed L-749A Constellation (F-BAZZ) operating the Paris-Nice portion of a passenger flight to Saigon crashed into Mount Cemet, France, with the loss of all 42 lives on board. The accident occurred while the flight deck crew was preparing to land at Nice's Côte d'Azur airport, the aircraft's first scheduled stop. The flight had deviated from the planned route for unknown reasons.
3 August 1954
Air France Flight 075, a Lockheed L-1049C Super Constellation (F-BGNA) flying from Orly Airport to Idlewild Airport force-landed in a field near Preston, Connecticut following fuel exhaustion. All 37 occupants survived.
25 August 1954
Air France Flight 075, a Lockheed L-749 Constellation (F-BAZI), was written off after it overran the runway at Gander Airport; all 67 passengers and crew on board survived.
10 May 1955
A Breguet Deux-Ponts (F-BASQ) made a forced landing in a field at Pont-Évêque, Isère following directional control problems in flight. The four crew and 46 passengers were unharmed. The aircraft was repaired on site and flown out from an improvised airstrip a few weeks later.
18 March 1955
A Douglas C-47A (F-BAXL) struck power lines and crashed on takeoff from Tille Airport, reportedly killing nine.
28 January 1956
A Douglas C-47 (F-BCYK) struck telephone lines and crashed while on approach to Bron Airport during a mail flight after the pilot became disorientated, killing the three crew.
12 December 1956
A Vickers Viscount 708 (F-BGNK) crashed near Dannemois, Île de France while on a training flight due to an unexplained loss of control, killing all five crew on board.
8 April 1957
A Douglas C-47B (registration F-BEIK) operating an Algerian passenger flight from Biskra lost height after takeoff due to engine failure and crashed a mile beyond the airport's runway with the loss of all 32 lives on board, although a source put the death toll at 34.
20 April 1957
A Lockheed Super Constellation (F-BGNE) flying from Tehran to Istanbul underwent explosive decompression after a window broke at 18,000 feet over Jirkouk, Iraq. A passenger was sucked out of the open window and fell to his death; his body was never recovered.
31 May 1958
A Douglas C-47A (registration F-BHKV) operating a military charter flight from Algiers to Colomb crashed near Molière with the loss of all 15 lives on board; a source put the death toll at 14.
24 December 1958
Air France Flight 703, a Lockheed L-749A Constellation (F-BAZX) crashed short of the runway at Schwechat Airport; all 34 on board survived.

== 1960s ==
29 August 1960
Air France Flight 343, a Lockheed L-1049G Super Constellation (F-BHBC) operating from Paris to Abidjan via Dakar, crashed into the sea with the loss of all 63 lives on board while the aircraft's crew made a second attempt to land at Dakar's Yoff Airport. The incident was blamed on a tropical wave that would become Hurricane Donna.
10 May 1961
Air France Flight 406, a Lockheed L-1649A Starliner (F-BHBM, named De Grasse) operating the Fort Lamy, Chad, to Marseille portion of Air France's Brazzaville – Paris flight crashed in the Sahara desert near Edjele, Algeria, with the loss of all 78 lives on board. The aircraft was cruising at an altitude of 20,000 feet (6,100 m) when its empennage failed. This caused it to break up in flight. The accident investigators believed that the empennage separated from the rest of the aircraft as a result of the detonation of a nitrocellulose explosive device.
15 June 1961
A Boeing 707 en route from Paris to Lima caught fire while landing at Lisbon Portela de Sacavém as a result of a burst tyre. Although only three out of 109 passengers were slightly injured and most of the baggage, cargo and mail was salvaged, hundreds of chickens on their way to a farm in Central America did not survive the accident.
27 July 1961
Air France Flight 272, a Boeing 707-328 (F-BHSA, named Chateau de Versailles) operating the polar route from Paris Orly via Hamburg and Anchorage to Tokyo Haneda veered to the left and ran off the runway at Hamburg Fuhlsbüttel, coming to rest 2,840 m from the starting point in depression containing a building site 140 m from the runway. The accident, which occurred while the aircraft was departing Fuhlsbüttel for Anchorage, severely damaged the aircraft, splitting the fuselage in two places ahead of the wings. As a result, ten of 41 occupants (four of 15 crew members and six of 26 passengers) sustained serious injuries.
12 September 1961
Air France Flight 2005, a Sud Aviation SE-210 Caravelle III (F-BJTB) operating a Paris Orly-Rabat-Casablanca service crashed near Rabat's airport with the loss of all 77 lives on board. At the time of the accident, meteorological conditions in the local area were thick, low fog. The poor weather conditions reduced horizontal visibility and ceiling. The pilot informed ATC that he wanted to attempt a break-through over the NDB. The aircraft was destroyed by fire when it impacted the ground, killing everyone on board. The accident investigators cited the commander's error in reading his instruments as the most likely cause.
3 June 1962
Air France Flight 007, a chartered Boeing 707-328 (registration F-BHSM), Chateau de Sully, flying from Orly Airport, Paris, France, to Atlanta's Hartsfield-Jackson Airport, crashed at Orly during takeoff. 130 out of 132 people on board were killed. Two flight attendants sitting in the rear section of the aircraft were saved. The investigation found a faulty servo motor, which had led to an improper (and non-adjustable) elevator trim. Brake marks measuring 1,500 feet (457 m) were found on the runway, indicating that the flight deck crew tried to abort takeoff. The aircraft rolled right while only seven feet (two m) from the ground, causing its right wing to hit the ground. It crashed 50 yards (45 m) from the runway and exploded. Of the passengers 106 were Atlanta art patrons who had finished a tour of European capitals. Ann Uhry Abrams, the author of Explosion at Orly: The True Account of the Disaster that Transformed Atlanta, described the incident as "Atlanta's version of Sept. 11 in that the impact on the city in 1962 was comparable to New York of Sept. 11." This was the deadliest crash in Air France history until the crash of Air France Flight 447.
22 June 1962
Air France Flight 117, operated with a Boeing 707-328 (F-BHST), crashed into a forest on a hill at an altitude of about 4,000 feet (1,200 m) during bad weather, while attempting to land at Pointe-à-Pitre in Guadeloupe, killing all 113 on board. The aircraft was attempting a non-precision NDB approach. A malfunctioning VOR station and poor NDB reception due to thunderstorms were blamed for the accident. The airframe had accumulated only 985 hours of flying at the time of the accident. After that crash Air France pilots criticized under-developed airports with facilities that were ill-equipped to handle jet aircraft, such as Guadeloupe's airport.
5 March 1968
Air France Flight 212, a Boeing 707-328C (F-BLCJ) operating a Caracas-Point-à-Pitre service hit the southern slope of La Soufrière Mountain at an altitude of 3,937 feet, 27.5 km SSW of Le Raizet Airport with the loss of all 63 lives on board. When ATC had cleared the flight deck crew for a visual approach to Le Raizet's runway 11, the crew had reported the airfield in sight. Flight 212 started to descend from FL90 and passed Saint Claude at an altitude of about 4,400 feet (1,300 m). The accident investigators cited the probable cause as a visual approach procedure at night in which the descent was begun from an incorrectly identified point. Charlie Juliet had flown for 33 hours since coming off the Boeing production line, and was on her second revenue service (her maiden passenger flight was the previous day's outbound journey from Paris).
11 September 1968
Air France Flight 1611, a Sud Aviation SE-210 Caravelle III (F-BOHB) operating an Ajaccio, Corsica – Nice service, crashed into the sea near Cap d'Antibes off Nice with the loss of all 95 lives on board. The accident occurred while the flight deck crew attempted an emergency landing at Côte d'Azur Airport, following the detection of a fire in the aircraft's rear cabin 21 minutes after takeoff from Ajaccio. The accident investigators believed that the fire had started in the right lavatory and galley area. In 2011, a former French Army soldier alleged that he saw a report that a missile shot down the aircraft.
3 December 1969
Air France Flight 212, a Boeing 707-328B (F-BHSZ) operating a Caracas-Point-à-Pitre service crashed into the sea shortly after takeoff from Simon Bolivar International Airport with the loss of all 62 on board.

== 1970s ==
24 July 1973
An Air France Fokker F27 Friendship crashed after it struck electric cables during approach, killing all three crew members onboard. The aircraft was re-built.
12 June 1975
Air France Flight 193, a Boeing 747-128 (N28888) operating the sector between Bombay (now Mumbai), and Tel Aviv to Paris-Charles de Gaulle Airport was destroyed by fire on the ground at Bombay's Santa Cruz Airport, following an aborted takeoff. The aircraft's tire on its right-hand main undercarriage had failed while the flight deck crew was executing a 180 degree turn at the beginning of Santa Cruz Airport's runway 27. When the flight deck crew began its takeoff run, another tire failed. At that point the plane's wheels and braking assembly came into contact with the runway, starting a fire. The crew aborted takeoff. The ensuing delay in shutting down the engines, as well as the improper deployment of the airport's fire service, caused the fire to spread, leading to the plane's total destruction. There were no fatalities among the 394 occupants (18 crew and 376 passengers).
Operation Entebbe
On 27 June 1976, an Airbus A300 (registration F-BVGG) operating as Flight 139 from Tel Aviv to Paris via Athens was hijacked shortly after departing Athens. After refueling in Benghazi, Libya, the hijackers demanded it be flown to Entebbe, Uganda. One hostage was freed in Benghazi and in Uganda another 155 non-Israeli and/or non-Jewish hostages were released. The flight crew remained with the hostages after Captain Bacos insisted he was responsible for them. After several days of negotiating and diplomatic interventions, Israel launched a commando raid into Entebbe to free them. During the assault, all six of the hijackers were killed as were three hostages. The leader of the rescue mission, Yoni Netanyahu, was also killed. One hostage, 75-year-old Dora Bloch, was unaccounted for. She had been taken to Mulago Hospital prior to the operation and later murdered on Idi Amin's orders.
14 June 1979
Air France Flight 054, a Concorde suffered a multiple tire burst on take off en route to Paris. Two tires burst, with the subsequent shrapnel piercing the wing, which consequently began to leak fuel. The crew did not notice this, until a passenger alerted the cabin crew to a hole in the wing. When the flight crew was informed, they immediately reduced thrust, and landed at Dulles Airport for a closer inspection. A similar issue for the Concorde occurred 21 years later, led to the Air France Flight 4590 disaster, which had a fatality count of 113 people (100 passengers, 9 crew and 4 people on the ground).

== 1980s ==
17 March 1982
Air France Flight 125, Airbus A300B4-203 suffered right hand engine failure and explosion during take off from Sanaa International Airport, Yemen. Crew managed to stop the aircraft, but due to the fuel tanks being punctured by parts from the engine, burst into flames. All 124 people on board survived.
18 January 1984
Air France Flight 171, a Boeing 747, suffered an explosion in the cargo hold en route from Karachi, Pakistan, to Dhahran, Saudi Arabia, shortly after departing Karachi blew a hole in the right rear cargo hold. The resulting loss of cabin pressure necessitated an immediate descent to 5,000 feet (1,500 m). The aircraft returned to Karachi without any fatalities among the 261 occupants (15 crew and 246 passengers).
2 December 1985
Air France Flight 091, a Boeing 747-228B (F-GCBC), veered off the runway on landing at the Rio de Janeiro-Galeão International Airport, crossed a ditch and collided with a concrete ramp. There were no fatalities or injuries among the 250 passengers and 23 crew. The aircraft was scrapped.
26 June 1988
Air France Flight 296Q, Airbus A320-111 (F-GFKC) crashed near Mulhouse-Habsheim Airport, in the French region of Alsace. The accident occurred during an airshow while the flight deck crew was performing a flypast at low height and speed. The aircraft overflew the airfield in good weather. Seconds later the aircraft struck treetops behind the runway and crashed into a forest, as a result of flying too low and too slow. Three passengers died and about 50 were injured.

== 1990s ==
12 September 1993
Air France Flight 072, a Boeing 747-428 registered F-GITA skidded out of runway 22 at Tahiti Faa'a International Airport – Papeete, French Polynesia. No fatalities reported.
24 December 1994
Air France Flight 8969, an Airbus A300B2-1C (registration F-GBEC) was hijacked at Marseille Provence International Airport in France, by four terrorists who belonged to the Armed Islamic Group. The terrorists apparently intended to crash the plane into the Eiffel Tower on Boxing Day. After a failed attempt to leave Marseille following a confrontational firefight between the terrorists and the GIGN French Special Forces, the result was the death of all four terrorists. (Snipers on the terminal front's roof shot dead two of the terrorists. The other two terrorists died as a result of gunshots in the cabin after approximately 20 minutes.) Three hostages, including a Vietnamese diplomat, were executed, 229 hostages survived, many of them wounded by shrapnel. The almost 15-year-old aircraft was written off.
5 September 1996
During Air France Flight 437 turbulence caused injuries to thirty people on a Boeing 747 in mid-air, operating Johannesburg to Paris. One passenger died later from injuries received from an in-flight film projection screen.
20 April 1998
Air France Flight 422: the Air France flight from Bogotá's El Dorado Airport, to Quito, using a Boeing 727 wet-leased from TAME, crashed into a mountain near Bogotá. All 43 passengers and 10 crew died. Although not an Air France plane, the flight was the final segment of an Air France flight originating in Paris.
5 March 1999
Air France Cargo Asie Flight 6745, an ex-UTA Boeing 747-2B3F (SCD) freighter (registration F-GPAN) carrying a revenue load of 66 tons of cargo from Paris Charles de Gaulle to Madras, (now Chennai) India crash-landed, caught fire and burned out. Madras ATC had cleared the aircraft for an ILS approach to the airport's runway 07. The crew abandoned the approach due to technical difficulties. The aircraft circled to attempt a second approach and at the end of the second approach, the aircraft's nose struck the runway while touching down because its nose gear was either not down or not locked. The plane skidded and came to rest 7,000 feet (2,100 m) down the 13,050 foot runway. After it had come to a standstill, the crew noticed smoke on the flight deck and began to extinguish the flames. Soon after, flames erupted in the aircraft's front section. One crew member managed to escape from the flight deck via a rope ladder. The remaining four crew members were rescued by the airport fire service from the rear, before the flames engulfed the entire aircraft. The fire service was unable to extinguish the fire and the aircraft burned out.

== 2000s ==
25 July 2000
Air France Flight 4590, a chartered Concorde (F-BTSC) departing from De Gaulle airport in Paris bound for New York's JFK Airport crashed into a hotel in Gonesse, France, just after takeoff, with the loss of all 109 people on board, as well as 4 people on the ground. According to the accident investigation report, the probable cause was the destruction of one of the aircraft's main wheel tires, as a result of passing at high speed over a part lost by a Continental Airlines DC-10 operating for Continental Airlines Flight 55 during its takeoff run. The damage to one of the fuel tanks by a piece of the exploding tire ignited the leaking jet fuel and caused a loss of thrust in engine number one and two in quick succession.
2 August 2005
Air France Flight 358, an Airbus A340-300 (registration F-GLZQ) overshot the runway at Toronto Pearson International Airport during a thunderstorm. The plane continued for 300 metres (980 ft) before coming to rest at the bottom of a ravine at the end of the runway next to Ontario Highway 401. All 297 passengers and 12 crew survived but the plane was completely destroyed by fire. The investigation predominately blamed pilot error when faced with severe weather conditions. The pilots did not enable maximum braking and thrust reverse until 12 seconds after touchdown, the wet runway combined with a tailwind and insufficient braking caused the aircraft to roll off the runway.
1 June 2009
Air France Flight 447, an Airbus A330-203 (registration F-GZCP) from Rio de Janeiro to Paris with 228 people on board lost contact with air traffic control while over the Atlantic Ocean, 300 km (190 mi; 160 nmi) north-east of the Brazilian city of Natal. In the days following the crash only portions of the plane and 51 bodies were found. All passengers and crew members were killed in the crash. It took just under two years to find the black boxes. The BEA's final report stated that the probable cause of the crash was the aircraft's pitot tubes icing over leading the autopilot to disconnect and handing full control of the aircraft to the pilots. The pilots were confused by various warnings and messages from the aircraft's on-board systems and pulled the nose of the plane up to the point where the aircraft stalled. The pilots failed to recognise that the aircraft had stalled until it was too late to prevent an uncontrolled and rapid descent into the Atlantic Ocean. The crash is the deadliest in Air France's history, as well as the deadliest crash involving the Airbus A330.

== 2010s ==
2 May 2015
Air France Flight 953, a Boeing 777-228ER registered as F-GSPG, flying from Malabo International Airport, Equatorial Guinea to Douala International Airport, Cameroon, nearly crashed into Mount Cameroon. All 37 occupants onboard survived without injury.
13 July 2015
Air France Flight 111, a Boeing 777-300ER (registration F-GSQF) from Shanghai to Paris lost an actuator door after take off, the actuator door dropped down and struck a factory located at No. 28 Yimin Road, Songjiang District, Shanghai, later this was handed over to the Civil Aviation Administration of China (CAAC) Eastern China Regional Administration to investigate. The plane was safely landed in Paris. Air France stated they were corporated with Boeing to investigate. Boeing published a service bulletin on 18 July for related guidance during maintenance works. The CAAC Eastern China Regional Administration opted not to publish investigation results.

30 September 2017
Air France Flight 066, an Airbus A380-800 (registration F-HPJE) from Paris to Los Angeles suffered an in-flight failure of the #4 engine (outermost right engine) when the main fan and engine inlet separated from the main engine assembly. The aircraft diverted to Goose Bay Airport in Newfoundland and Labrador, where it made an emergency landing. The plane landed safely and no passengers or crew were harmed. Passengers reported a loud thud followed by vibrations. The runway the plane landed on had to be cleaned after landing because debris from the engine had littered the runway. Passengers had to stay onboard because the airport does not have capacity to accommodate such large number of passengers from commercial aircraft. Air France dispatched two Boeing 777-300ER from Montreal, continuing to take the passengers to Los Angeles. The BEA released its final report in September 2020, indicating that the engine failed from a crack in the Ti-6-4 alloy fan hub caused by cold dwell fatigue cracking.

25 October 2017
Air France Flight 125, a Boeing 777-300ER (registration F-GSQX) from Beijing to Paris suffered an in-flight fire alarm, and the pilot reported the 7700 code call shortly after takeoff. The aircraft was flown back to Beijing Capital International Airport.

11 November 2018
Air France Flight 116, a Boeing 777-300ER (registration F-GSQC) from Paris to Shanghai suffered a mechanical malfunction in flight, and smoke filled the cabin. The plane was diverted to Irkutsk. Then Air France dispatched another Boeing 777-300ER (registration F-GSQB) operating Air France Flight 384V from Paris to evacuate passengers, the plane arrived at Irkutsk the next day. However, F-GSQB was later found unflyable due to hydraulic icing, so Air France dispatched a third Boeing 777-300ER (registration F-GZNE) operating Air France Flight 380V from Paris, the plane arrived at Irkutsk the next day, and successfully arrived at Shanghai on 14 November.

== 2020s ==
31 December 2020
Air France Flight 736, an Airbus A330-203 (registered as F-GZCJ), en route from Brazzaville to Paris Charles-De Gaulle Airport had a fuel leak on engine 1. A Mayday call was made and the flight diverted to N'Djamena Airport in Chad. Although fuel leak was identified and located in the left engine mid-flight, the crew decided to keep said engine operating, which went against fuel leak procedure. No one was injured and the plane resumed regular service on 6 January 2021.

3 June 2021
Air France Flight 865, a Boeing 787-9 (registered as F-HRBF) en route from N'Djamena, Chad to Charles-De Gaulle Airport was escorted until landing in Paris by a French Air Force jet after receiving an anonymous threat regarding the presence of an explosive device on board. The aircraft landed normally, and the passengers were evacuated and the incident was being investigated by the French government.

4 April 2022
The pilots of Air France Flight 011, a Boeing 777 from New York to Paris struggled to control the plane during landing and were engaged in a kind of "tug-of-war" – apparently unaware of each other’s inputs on the controls, according to a report.

August 2022
It was reported that two pilots were suspended after a fistfight in the cockpit of an Airbus A320 in flight.

21 January 2024
While attempting to land on runway 24L at Toronto Pearson International Airport, Air France Flight 356, an Airbus A350-900, initiated a go-around and suffered a tailstrike. The aircraft circled round for a second attempt and landed on the same runway without further incident. No injuries were reported but the aircraft received significant damage.

31 May 2024
An Air France Airbus A330-203, (registered as F-GZCL), named "Chenonceaux" completed Air France Flight 878, suffered a severe damage to its fuselage when parked at N'Djamena Airport in Chad due to the strong wind from a cumulonimbus causing the plane to pivot on the main gear, which led to the nose gear to move more than a meter to the right, colliding with the high loader assigned to loading containers. The aircraft received minor to moderate damage; however, it was withdrawn from service and was retired from the fleet the following day after serving 21 years with the company.

== Hijackings ==
Air France has been the target of several hijackings, which are listed in chronological order:

- 1973 Marseille
- 1976 Benghazi (Operation Entebbe) and Saigon
- 1977 Benghazi and Brindisi
- 1983 Tehran
- 1984 Geneva and Tehran
- 1989 Algiers
- 1993 Nice
- 1994 Algiers
- 1999 Paris
