= Aero Portuguesa =

First airline of Portugal with scheduled international services

Aero Portuguesa (AP, sometimes written Aero-Portuguesa, short names for the Sociedade Aero Portuguesa Lda. - Air Portuguese Society, Ltd.) was the first airline of Portugal with scheduled international services. It existed from 1934 to 1953, when its routes were integrated in the TAP service.

AP was created with the main objective of providing a regular air connection between Portugal, Morocco and Brazil. Flights from Lisbon to Casablanca and Tangier started in 1934, followed by Lisbon-Brazil service in 1936. There were also plans to establish routes between Lisbon, Madrid and Paris, between the Portuguese colonies of Guinea and Cape Verde and between the French Congo and the Portuguese colony of Angola, but the start of World War II didn't allow this.

During World War II, AP gained the importance of being the only company of a neutral country authorized to fly to a belligerent territory. Because of this, AP become the only way of communication of the allies with North Africa. These flights were used by many refugees from Europe, who were looking for refuge in Tangier. The AP route from Lisbon to Casablanca became world-famous from the movie Casablanca with Humphrey Bogart and Ingrid Bergman.

AP was absorbed by TAP in 1953.

== Operated aircraft ==
- Wibault 283-T
- Junkers Ju 52
- Fokker F.VII
- Lockheed Lodestar
- Farman
