= Wibault 280 =

Type of aircraft

Wibault 280-T
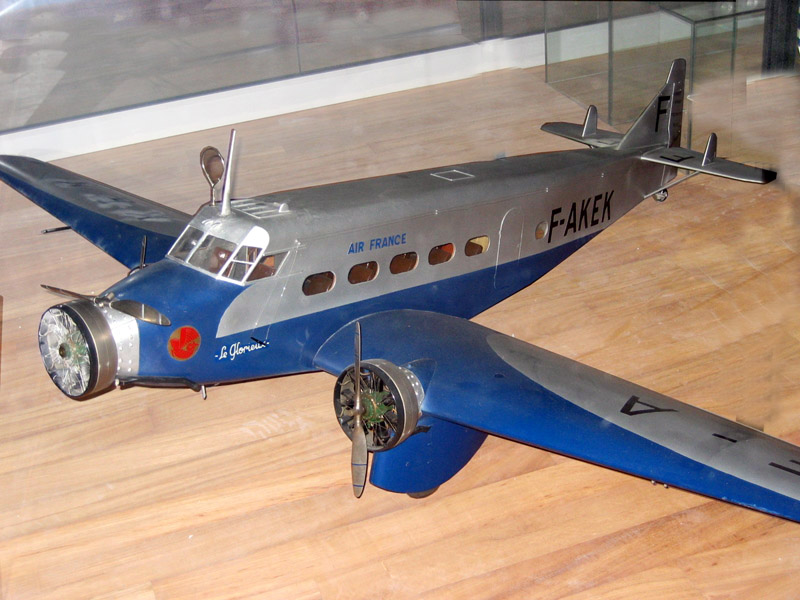
- Scale model of Wibault 283.T12 F-AMYF

General information
- Type: Passenger transport monoplane
- Manufacturer: Wibault
- Designer: Michel Wibault
- Primary users: Air France Air Union; Aero Portuguesa

History
- First flight: 1930

The Wibault 280-T was a monoplane trimotor airliner designed and produced by the French aircraft manufacturer Wibault. Designed to accommodate up to 12 passengers in its largest variant, development of the aircraft was financially backed by the Penhoët shipyards, which led to the aircraft alternatively being referred to as 'Penhoët Wibault'.

== Development ==
Development of what would become the Wibault 280 was heavily financed by the Penhoët shipyards of St Nazaire. During November 1930, the prototype Penhoët Wibault 280-T performed its maiden flight from Villacoublay. It was powered by three 300 hp (224 kW) Hispano-Wright 9Qa radial engines, although these were soon replaced by three Gnome-Rhône 7Kb, after which the aircraft was redesignated the Wibault 281-T.

A second aircraft was built to the 281 standard but then it was converted to a Wibault 282-T with three 350 hp (261 kW) Gnome-Rhône 7Kd engines and room for 12 passengers, seven further aircraft were built as 282s. Some of the 282s were operated by Air Union on the Paris-London Voile d'Or ("Golden Clipper") service in 1933. During 1934, Air France took delivery of the first of ten Wibault 283-Ts which had an increased fuel capacity and modified tail. Some of the 282s were subsequently converted to 283 standard. Several commercial aircraft were later taken over as military transports.

== Design ==
The Wibault 280 was an all-metal cantilever monoplane trimotor airliner. The fuselage was constructed out of three separate sections, which were sized as such to permit their transportation by rail. The forward section of the fuselage contained the central engine bay, firewall, and the baggage compartment. The central section of the fuselage contains the cockpit and passenger cabins; the former seated a flight crew of two in a side-by-side arrangement on adjustable seats, both positions being provided with flight controls. The cockpit had numerous windows that were arranged so that the pilots were able to readily view multiple angles, including upwards and rearwards.

The passenger cabin was relatively spacious, being able to accommodate up to ten passengers and providing ample height for the average person to move around entirely upright. Amenities included an adjustable ventilation system and the placement of a large window besides every seat. The rear of the passenger cabin is occupied by the lavatory and the entrance door. The third and rearmost section of the fuselage comprised a freight compartment, which was accessible via an external door, and a radio set; the rearmost element of the section was a sternpost that supported the tail surfaces. The horizontal empennage consisted of a stabilizer, which was adjustable mid-flight, and a two-part unbalanced elevator. The vertical empennage comprised a fin and an unbalanced rudder. All the tail surfaces are covered with sheet metal, as were the walls of the passenger cabin and the exterior covering. The structure of the fuselage comprised several T-section longerons.

The Wibault 280 was originally powered by a total of three Hispano-Wright 9Qa air-cooled radial engines, which had provided a total power output of 936 hp. Provisions for the use of alternative engines of roughly the same power, such as the Gnome-Rhône 7Kd, were made from the onset. These engines were arranged with the central engine being mounted within the aircraft's nose while the lateral engines were mounted on bearers that were connected to the leading edge of the wing. These engines drove Ratier-built metal variable-pitch propellers and were fitted with lengthy exhaust pipes that functioned as silencers. Fuel was housed in two wing-mounted tanks which had a combined capacity of 1,200 litres (317 gallons); these were designed with a mechanism that allowed for the tanks to be dropped mid-flight as an emergency measure.

It had a relatively low-mounted wing, the floor of the fuselage being run directly upon the two I-shaped duralumin spars of this wing; advantages of this configuration included the wing being nearer to the ground and thus easier to conduct most ground-based inspection and maintenance activities, as well as the wing providing some shielding for the passengers in the event of an accident. The wing was made up of three sections, these being the central rectangular section and two tapering lateral parts. The central section, which maintained consistent thickness and chord, supported the fuselage, engine mounts, and the undercarriage. The lateral parts decreased in thickness and thus increased the wing's lateral dihedral; relatively narrow ailerons were hinged (upon ball bearings) to the trailing edge of these lateral parts. Both of the wing spars were braced so that stresses would be evenly conveyed between them, while the duralumin ribs were reinforced using rivetted stiffeners; sheet metal panels covered the exterior.

The undercarriage, which was fitted with non-continuous elbow-type axles, had a structure that comprised a pair of independent flexible trihedrals. The compact axles connected with Messier-supplied oleo-pneumatic shock absorbers; the wheels were equipped with brakes in order to reduce the landing distance required. While the main undercarriage was fitted with wheels, the tail element comprised a cast light alloy skid that was mounted directly underneath the sternpost.

== Accidents and incidents ==
- On 9 May 1934, Wibault 282-T F-AMHP of Air France crashed into the English Channel off Dungeness, Kent, United Kingdom, killing all six people on board.
- On 19 May 1934, a Golden Clipper of Air France crash-landed on a cricket pitch adjacent to Croydon Airport, Surrey, United Kingdom, due to fuel exhaustion. Only one of the ten people on board was injured.
- On 24 December 1937, Wibault-Penhoët 283.T12 (c/n 11) F-AMYD of Air France crashed near Zhůří (currently part of Rejštejn), Czechoslovakia, due to a navigational error. The aircraft was supposed to land at Prague, but was directed by controllers to fly south and crashed in foggy, snowy and dark conditions after 120 km (75 mi). Two pilots and a single passenger were killed.

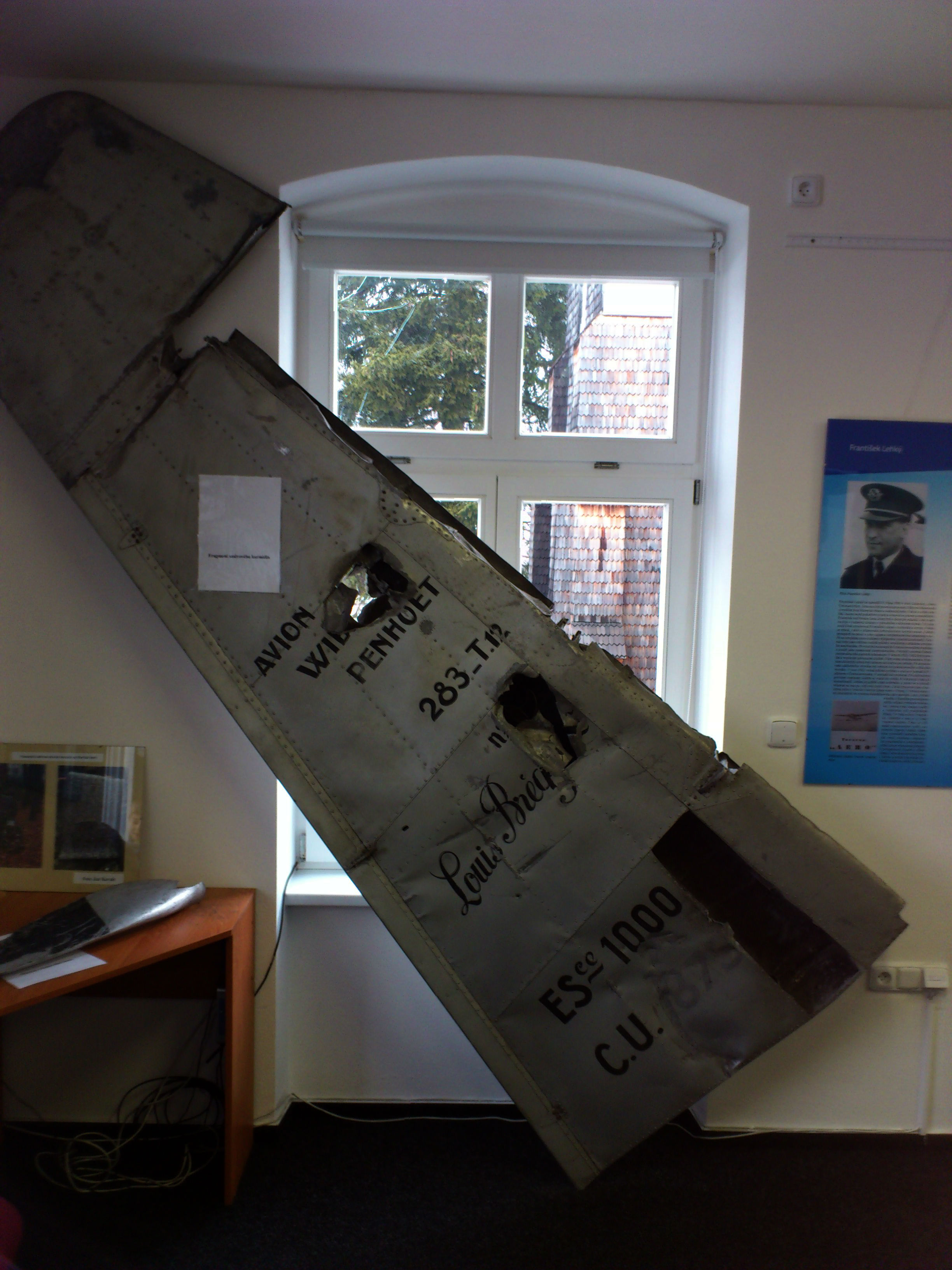
Rudder of Penhoët Wibault 283.T12 F-AMYD displayed on an exhibition at Kvilda

== Variants ==
Penhoët Wibault 280-T
Prototype with three 300 hp (220 kW) Hispano-Wright 9Qa radial engines, one built converted to a 281 and then to a 282.
Wibault 281-T
Prototype with three 350 hp (260 kW) Gnome-Rhône 7Kd radial engines. One built as such and one converted from 280-T. Both converted to 282-Ts.
Wibault 282-T
10-passenger production variant with Gnome-Rhône 7Kd engines with cowlings around the wing-mounted engines. Six built from new plus two converted prototypes.
Wibault 283-T
Production variant for Air France with three Gnome-Rhône 7Kd engines, NACA cowlings, increased fuel capacity, higher weights and a modified tail, ten built.

== In popular culture ==
A series 280 Wibault features in L'Oreille cassée a late thirties episode of Les aventures de tintin depicting a treasure hunt in a fictional revolution-torn south american republic. The Wibault is painted in a gloss black and bright yellow livery bearing the well known winged seahorse Air France mascot affectionately dubbed "the shrimp" by Air France staff. Ramon Bada and Alonzo Perez, the archetypal south american knife-wielding vilains, can be seen boarding the airliner at Le Bourget,using the period real life transatlantic combined express service (airplane from Le Bourget to Le Havre or Bordeaux and then an ocean liner to America.

== Operators ==
France

- Air France
- Air Union
- French Air Force

Portugal

- Aero Portuguesa

== Specifications (283-T-12) ==
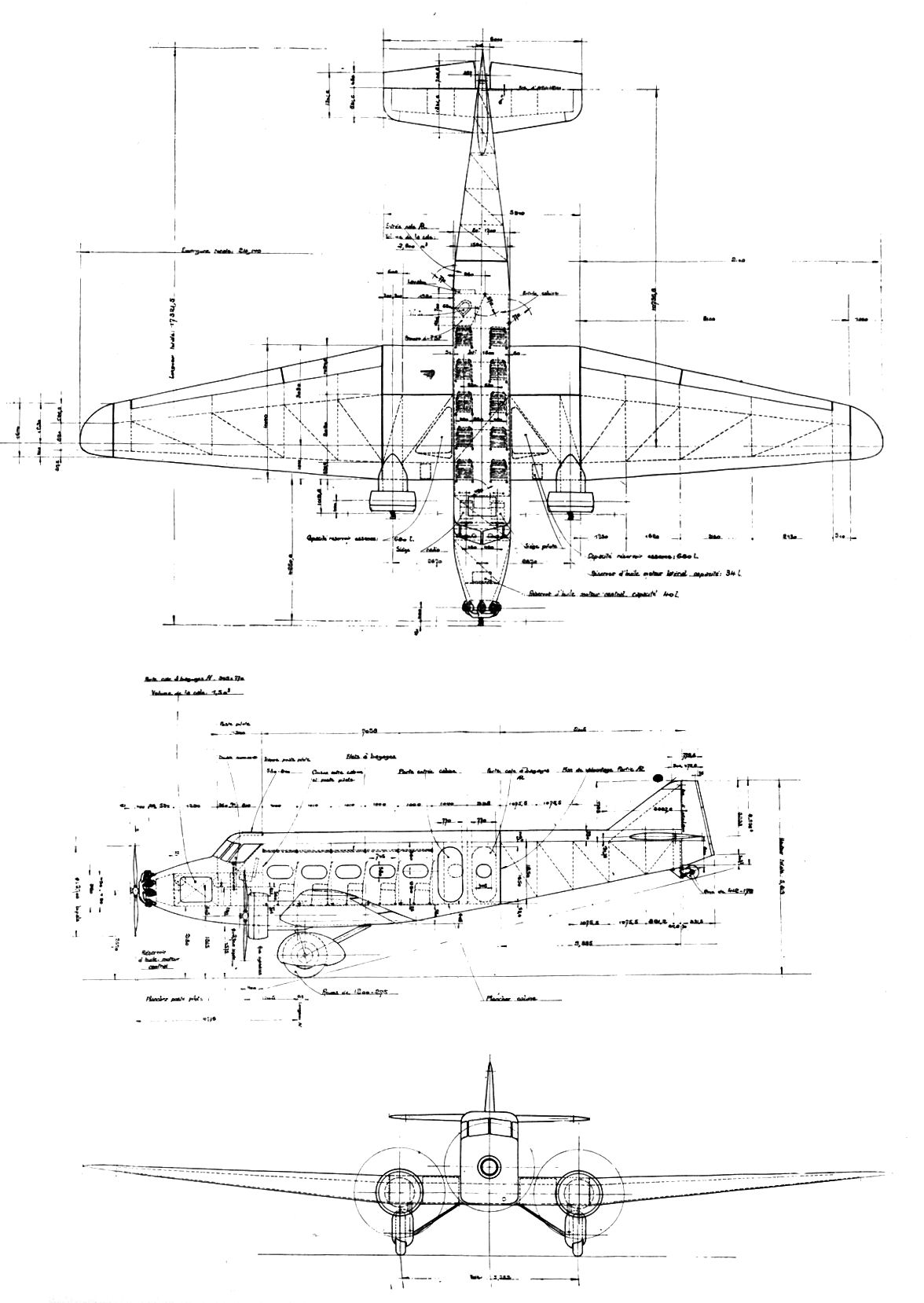
Wibault 282 T12 3-view drawing from L'Aerophile September 1933

Data from European Transport Aircraft since 1910, The Wibault 280 T.10 commercial airplane (French)

General characteristics

- Crew: 2
- Capacity: Ten passengers
- Length: 17.0 m (55 ft 9 in)
- Wingspan: 22.61 m (74 ft 2 in)
- Height: 5.75 m (18 ft 10 in)
- Wing area: 64.4 m^{2} (693 sq ft)
- Empty weight: 4,266 kg (9,405 lb)
- Gross weight: 6,350 kg (13,999 lb)
- Powerplant: 3 × Gnome-Rhône Titan Major 7Kd seven-cylinder air-cooled radial engine, 260 kW (350 hp) each

Performance

- Maximum speed: 251 km/h (156 mph, 136 kn)
- Cruise speed: 230 km/h (140 mph, 120 kn)
- Range: 1,000 km (620 mi, 540 nmi)
- Service ceiling: 5,200 m (17,100 ft)
