= 1934 Air France Wibault 282T crash =

1934 aviation accident

Coordinates: 50°46′55″N 1°8′42″E

Accident
- Date: 9 May 1934
- Summary: Controlled flight into terrain
- Site: English Channel

Aircraft
- Aircraft type: Wibault 282T-12
- Operator: Air France
- Registration: F-AMHP
- Flight origin: Le Bourget, Paris, France
- Destination: Croydon, Surrey, United Kingdom
- Passengers: 3
- Crew: 3
- Fatalities: 6
- Survivors: 0

On 9 May 1934, a Wibault 282T-12 of Air France crashed into the English Channel off Dungeness, United Kingdom, while operating an international scheduled passenger flight from Le Bourget, Paris, France to Croydon, Surrey, United Kingdom. All six people on board were killed.

== Aircraft ==
The accident aircraft was Wibault 282T-12 F-AMHP, c/n 8. The aircraft had entered service with Air Union on 21 August 1933, passing to Air France on formation.

== Accident ==
The aircraft was operating a scheduled international passenger flight from Le Bourget Airport in Paris, France, to Croydon Airport in Surrey, United Kingdom. It carried three crew members and three passengers. The aircraft had taken off from Le Bourget at 11:15 local time (10:15 GMT) and passed over Le Tréport, Seine-Maritime at 12:10. At 12:19, a radio fix from Croydon confirmed the aircraft's position as 18 1/2 miles (29.8 km) west-southwest of Boulogne, Pas-de-Calais. There were no further communication received. At the time, the weather conditions included low cloud cover.

At 17:20 GMT, the Folkestone lifeboat was launched with instructions to search the sea at a position 12 miles (19 km) south east by south of Dungeness, where wreckage had reportedly been sighted. The Dover lifeboat also joined the search but thick fog hindered the search. Despite their effort, no trace of the aircraft was found. The Folkestone lifeboat did not return to its station until after 22:00 GMT. The absence of an SOS call from the aircraft indicated that it had crashed into the sea while attempting to fly below the low cloud base. On 18 May, a mailbag from the aircraft was washed up on the French coast.

== Casualties ==
The nationalities of the casualties were:-

Nationality	Crew	Passengers	Total
French	2	2	4
British	1	–	1
Swiss	–	1	1
Total	3	3	6

== Sources ==
- Denham, Terry (1996). World Directory of Airliner Crashes. Sparkford: Patrick Stephens Ltd. ISBN 1-85260-554-5.
