= Air France Flight 2005 =

1961 aviation accident

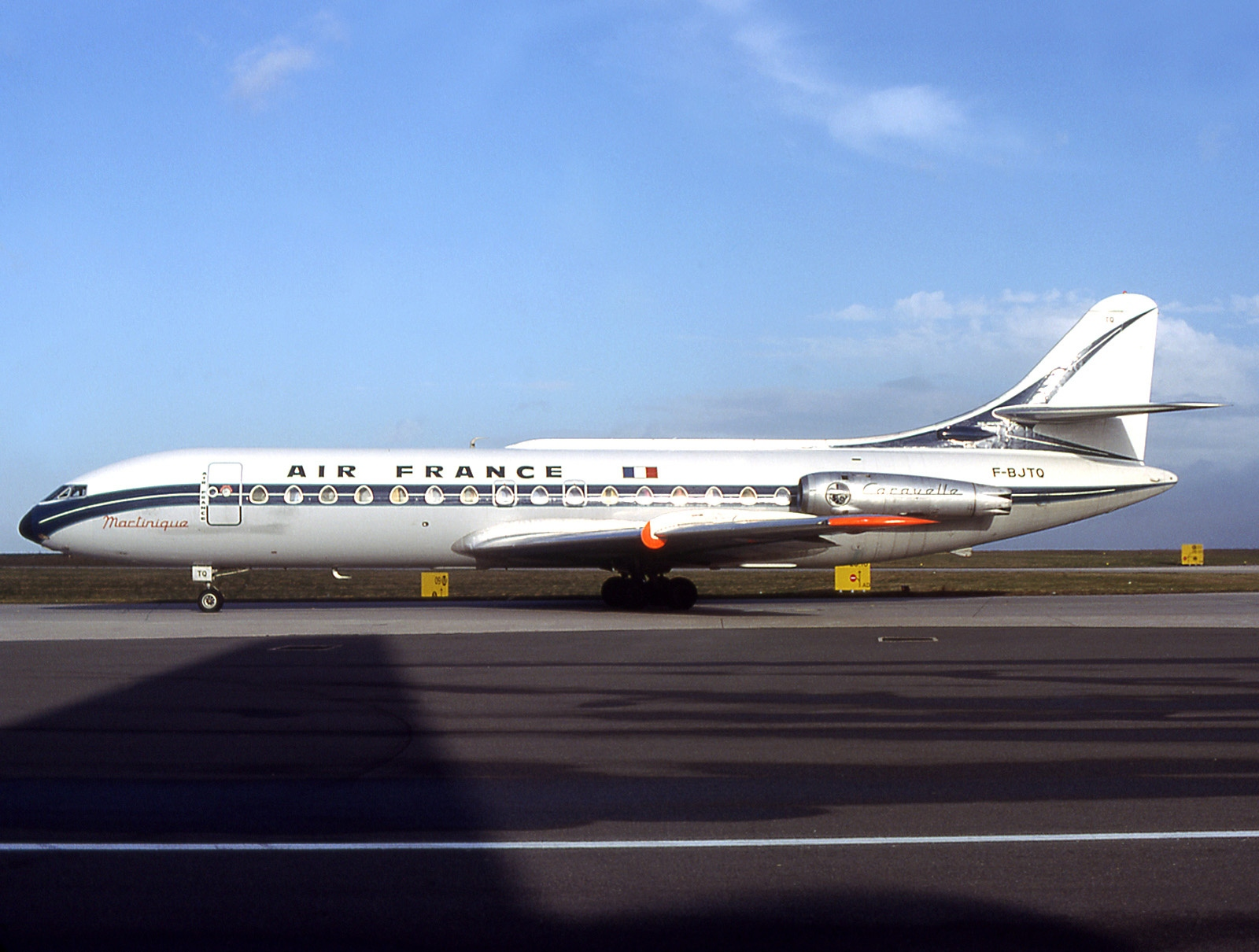
- A Sud Aviation Caravelle of Air France, similar to the accident aircraft

Accident
- Date: 12 September 1961
- Summary: Error in instrument reading
- Site: Near Rabat-Salé Airport, Rabat, Morocco; 33°59′6″N 6°49′34″W

Aircraft
- Aircraft type: Sud Aviation Caravelle
- Aircraft name: Antilles
- Operator: Air France
- IATA flight No.: AF2005
- ICAO flight No.: AFR2005
- Call sign: AIRFRANS 2005
- Registration: F-BJTB
- Flight origin: Orly Airport, Paris, France
- Stopover: Rabat-Salé Airport, Salé, Morocco
- Destination: Mohammed V International Airport, Casablanca, Morocco
- Occupants: 77
- Passengers: 71
- Crew: 6
- Fatalities: 77
- Survivors: 0

Air France Flight 2005 of 12 September 1961 was a scheduled international passenger flight from Paris-Orly Airport to Casablanca Airport with a stop at Rabat-Salé Airport. The Sud Aviation Caravelle aircraft crashed that day at 21:09 GMT near a place called Douar Doum 8.4 kilometres (5.2 mi; 4.5 nmi) from the threshold of runway 04 and 1.4 kilometres (0.87 mi; 0.76 nmi) to the left of the extended centreline at a height of 87.5 metres (287 ft) above sea level, killing all 77 people on board, including 6 crew members. The weather was foggy and unfavourable for landing.

== Flight history ==
The aircraft left Paris (ORY) at 18:26 GMT for the first leg to Rabat with passengers and load within limits and fuel for four hours. The flight was uneventful until approaching Rabat/Salè airport. At 21:09 GMT the aircraft hit the ground before reaching the runway. It was completely destroyed.

== Investigation ==
The investigation concluded that there was no evidence of technical failure, neither for physical failure of the personnel nor of air traffic control. Weather conditions were very unfavourable for landing at Rabat/Salé and fast changing and deteriorating shortly before the accident. The pilot took advice from the Air France operations agent in Casablanca and considered proceeding directly to Casablanca because of the weather.

During the flight the crew reviewed the weather several times with the air traffic control and finally decided to land at Rabat, using the non-directional beacon (NDB). Air traffic control warned the pilot that the NDB was not aligned with the runway, but this message received no response. The investigation reported an "Error in instrument reading" as probable cause.

== See also ==
- Air France Flight 406, another Air France aviation disaster that took place on the continent of Africa in 1961
