= Air France Flight 406 =

1961 airliner bombing

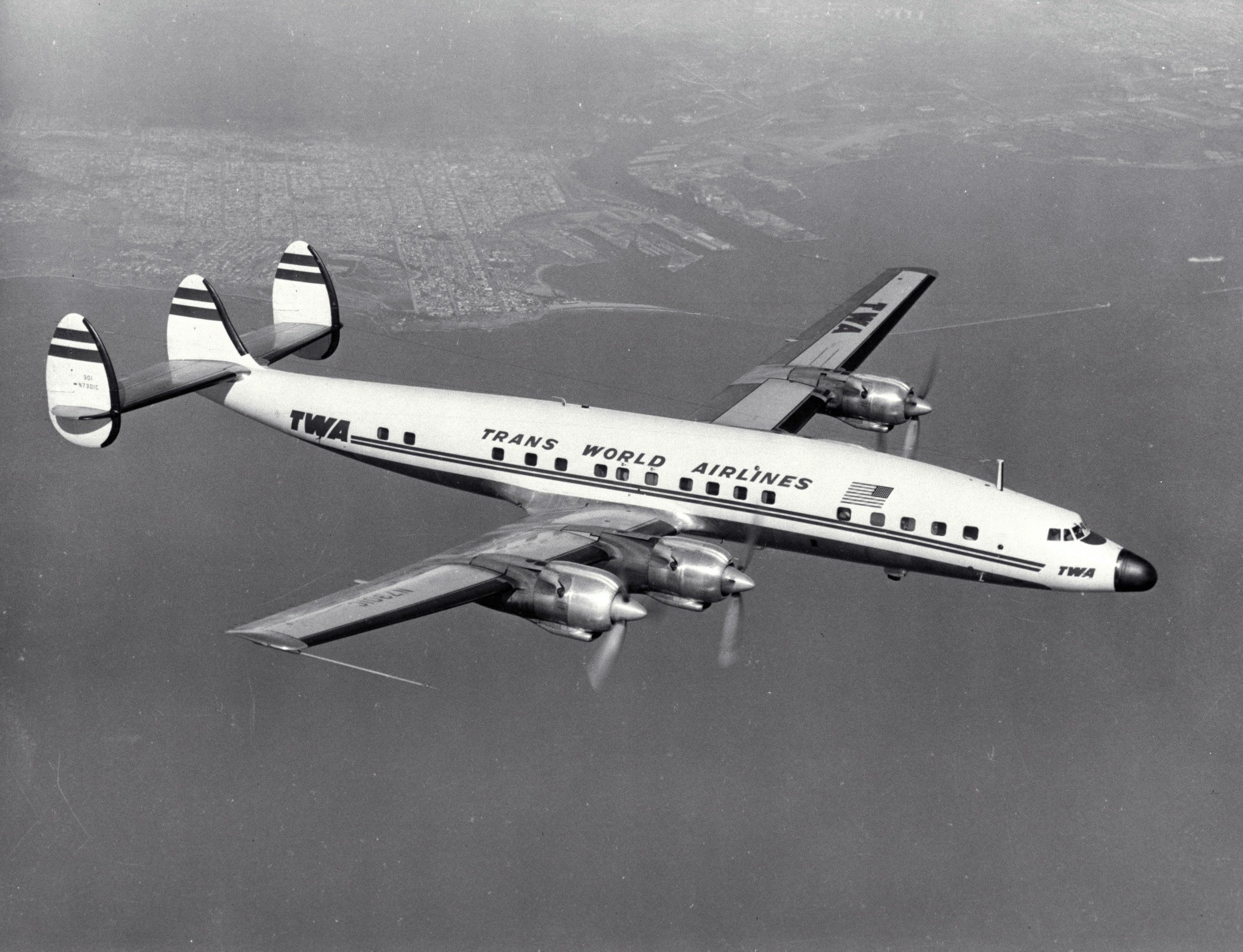
- A TWA Starliner similar to the accident aircraft

Bombing
- Date: 10 May 1961
- Summary: Bombing in flight
- Site: Debdeb, Algeria, Sahara Desert; 29°N 9°E

Aircraft
- Aircraft type: Lockheed L-1649 Starliner
- Aircraft name: De Grasse
- Operator: Air France
- Call sign: AIRFRANS 406
- Registration: F-BHBM
- Flight origin: Brazzaville, Congo
- 1st stopover: Fort Lamy Airport, Fort Lamy (now N'Djamena), Chad
- Last stopover: Marseille-Marignane Airport, Marseille, France
- Destination: Marignane Airport, Bouches-du-Rhône, France
- Occupants: 78
- Passengers: 69
- Crew: 9
- Fatalities: 78
- Survivors: 0

Air France Flight 406 was a Lockheed L-1649 Starliner that crashed in French Algeria on May 10, 1961, after a bomb exploded on board. All 78 passengers and crew on board were killed. It was the deadliest aviation disaster involving a Lockheed Starliner.

== Flight ==
Air France Flight 406 was an international scheduled passenger flight originating in Brazzaville, Congo, on a route with the final destination Marignane Airport, France. Intermediate stops were Fort Lamy, Chad, and Marseille, France. The flight was flown by a Lockheed L-1649 Starliner, F-BHBM De Grasse.

After taking off from Fort Lamy, and while cruising at an altitude of approximately 20,000 feet (6,100 m), the Starliner broke up after its empennage failed. The plane crashed to earth approximately 35 miles (56 km) from Edjele oilfield, near the Libya border. All aboard Flight 406 were killed.

Eighteen children were among the dead. Among them were the three young children of the United States Charge d'Affaires in the Central African Republic, who, along with their mother (the charge's wife), were on Flight 406 headed for London. Also among the dead were a count and countess, plus two Central African Republic government ministers. Rumors began to surface after Flight 406's crash that it had been an assassination by enemies of the Central African Republic.

== Investigation ==
The most probable cause of Air France Flight 406 crashing was sabotage with a nitrocellulose explosive. The motive for the bombing remains unclear, as no one was arrested, caught, or owned up to being the bomber.

== See also ==
- List of accidents and incidents involving commercial aircraft
- UTA Flight 772, which was bombed over a desert
- Air France Flight 2005, another Air France aviation disaster that took place on the continent of Africa in 1961
