= Jhansi Cantonment Cemetery =

European cemetery in Uttar Pradesh, India

Coordinates: 25°25′39″N 78°35′23″E

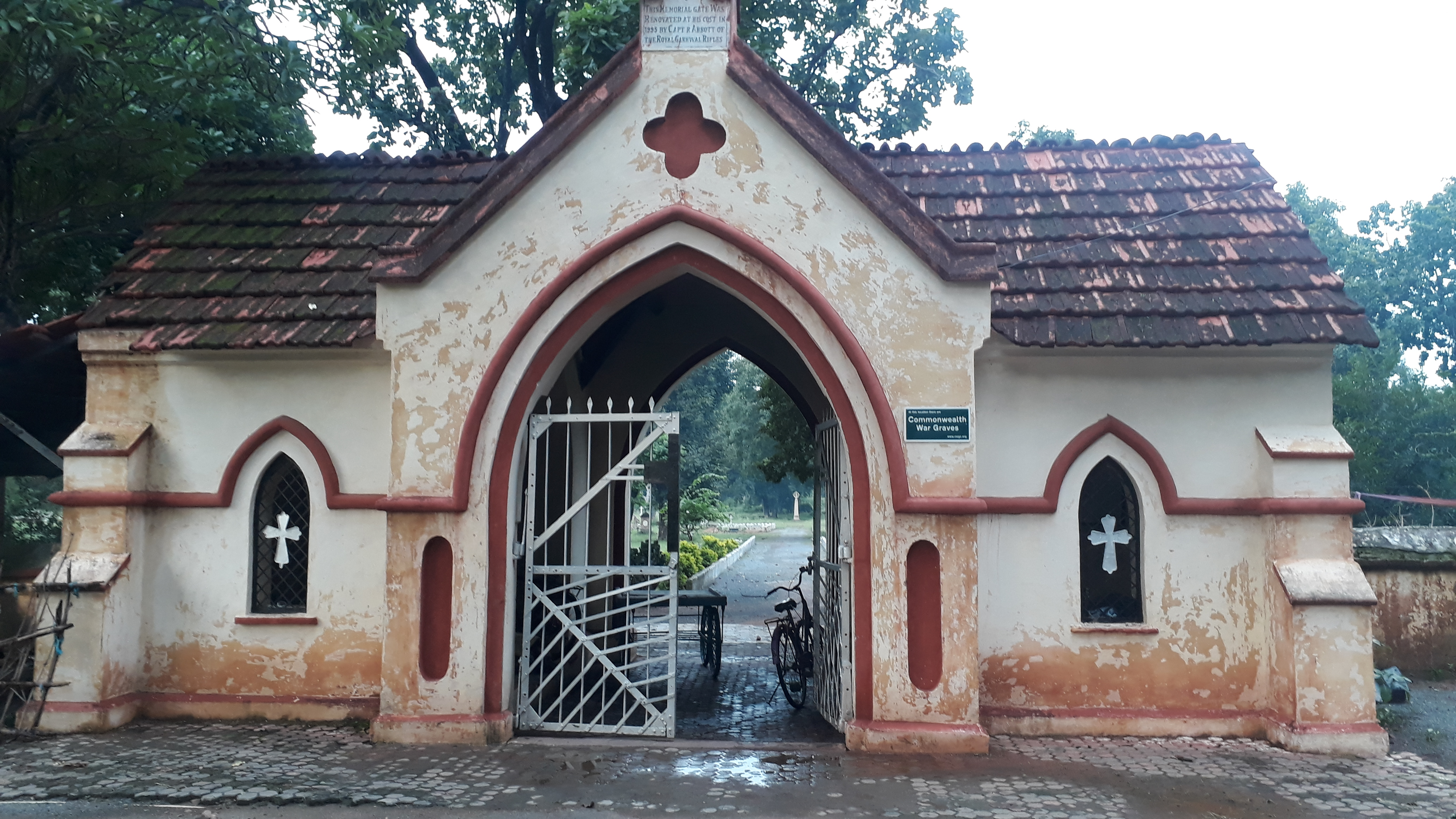
- Entrance of Jhansi Cantonment Cemetery
- Interactive map of Jhansi Cantonment Cemetery

Details
- Established: 19th century
- Location: Jhansi, Uttar Pradesh
- Country: India

Jhansi Cantonment Cemetery is a historic European cemetery situated at the military cantonment in Jhansi, Uttar Pradesh, India. A number of British civilian and military personnel who died in the Jhansi Mutiny massacre of 1857 were buried there. The graves include those of British officers, their wives and children, and railway workers and their families, along with those of members of Indian, Scottish, Welsh and West African regiments of the British Indian Army who died during the time of Indian Rebellion of 1857 and the First World War.

== Gallery ==
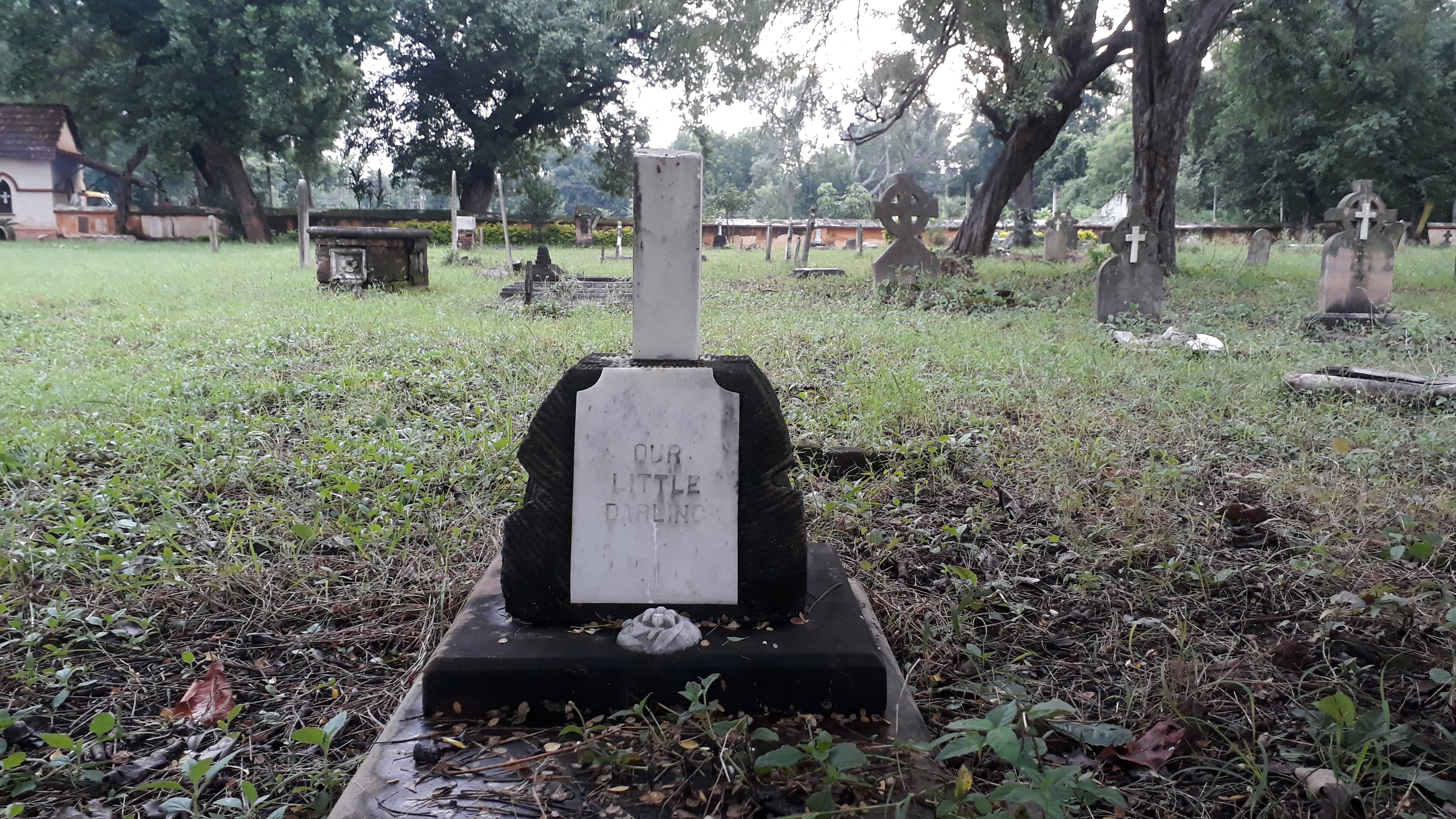
An unnamed grave

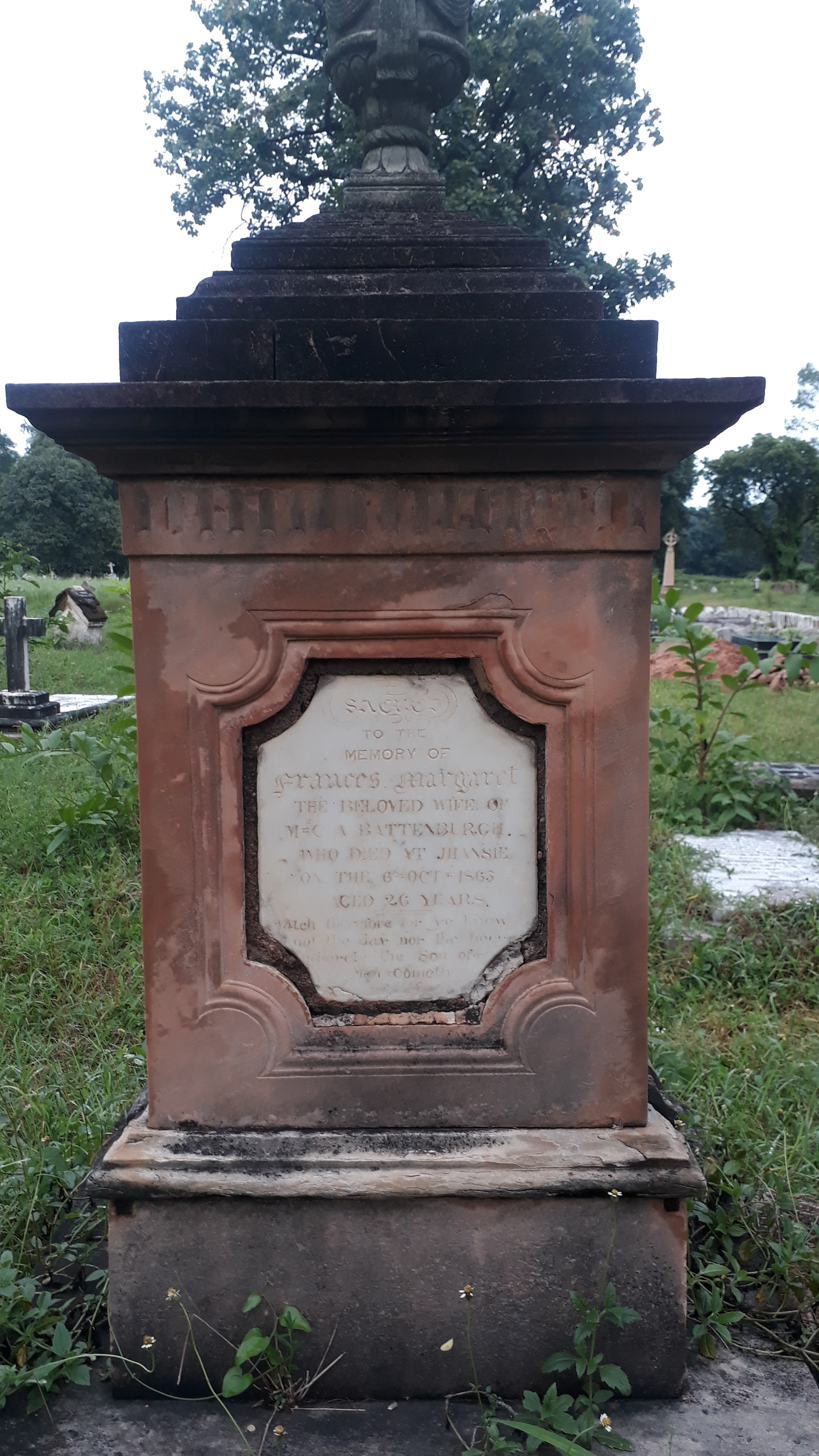
Grave of Frances Margaret

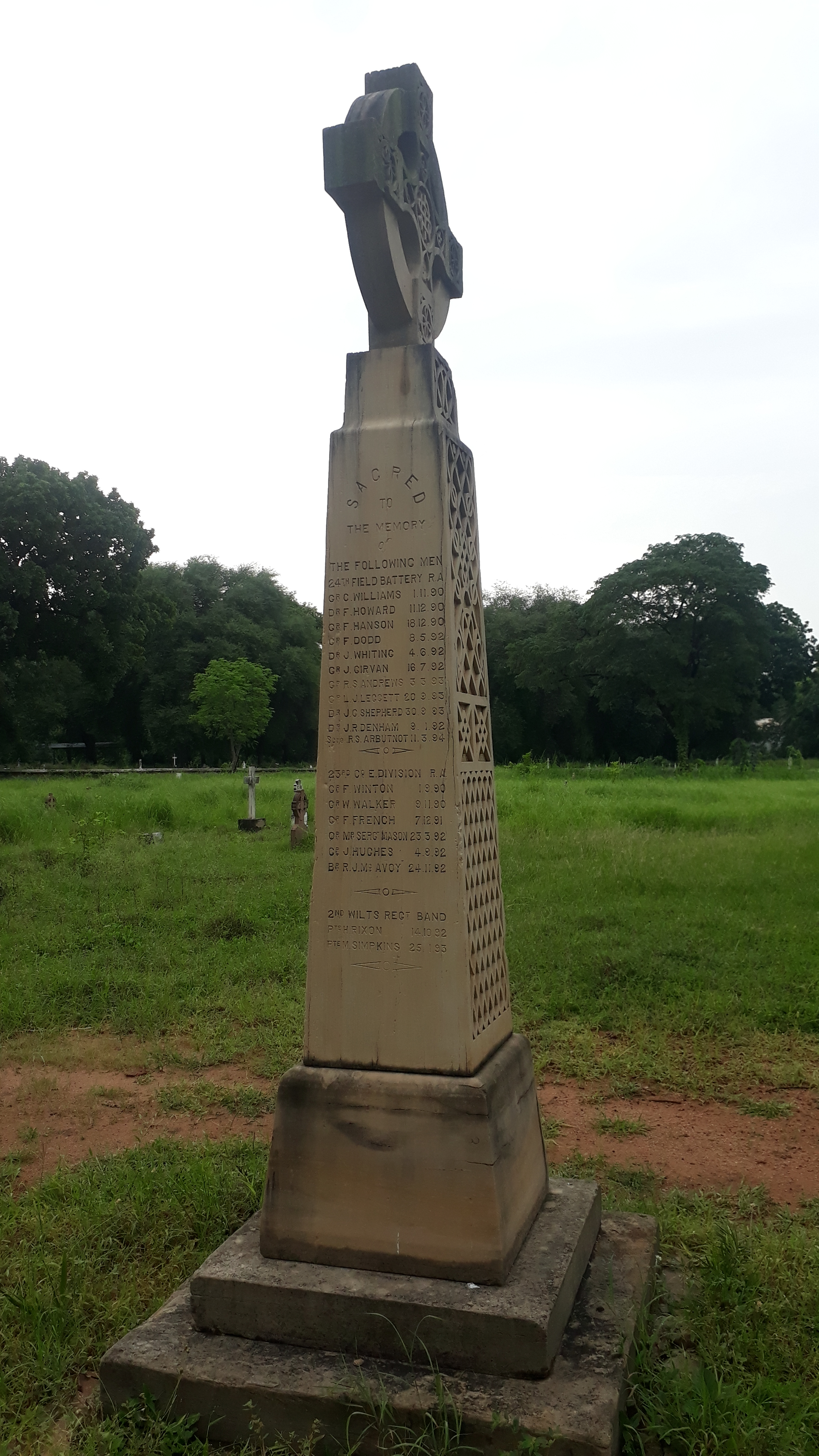
Memory of died soldier

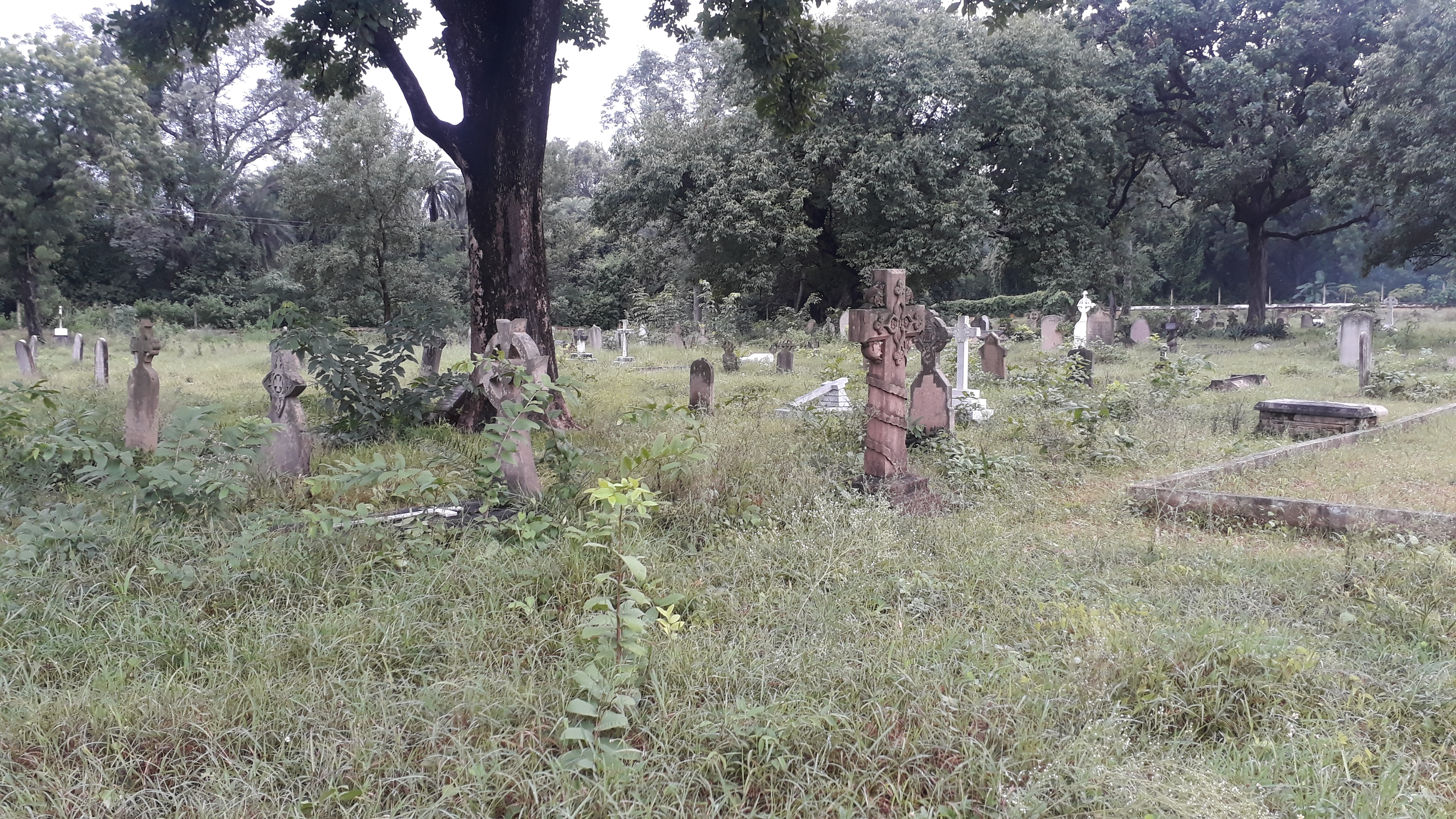
Cemetery complex

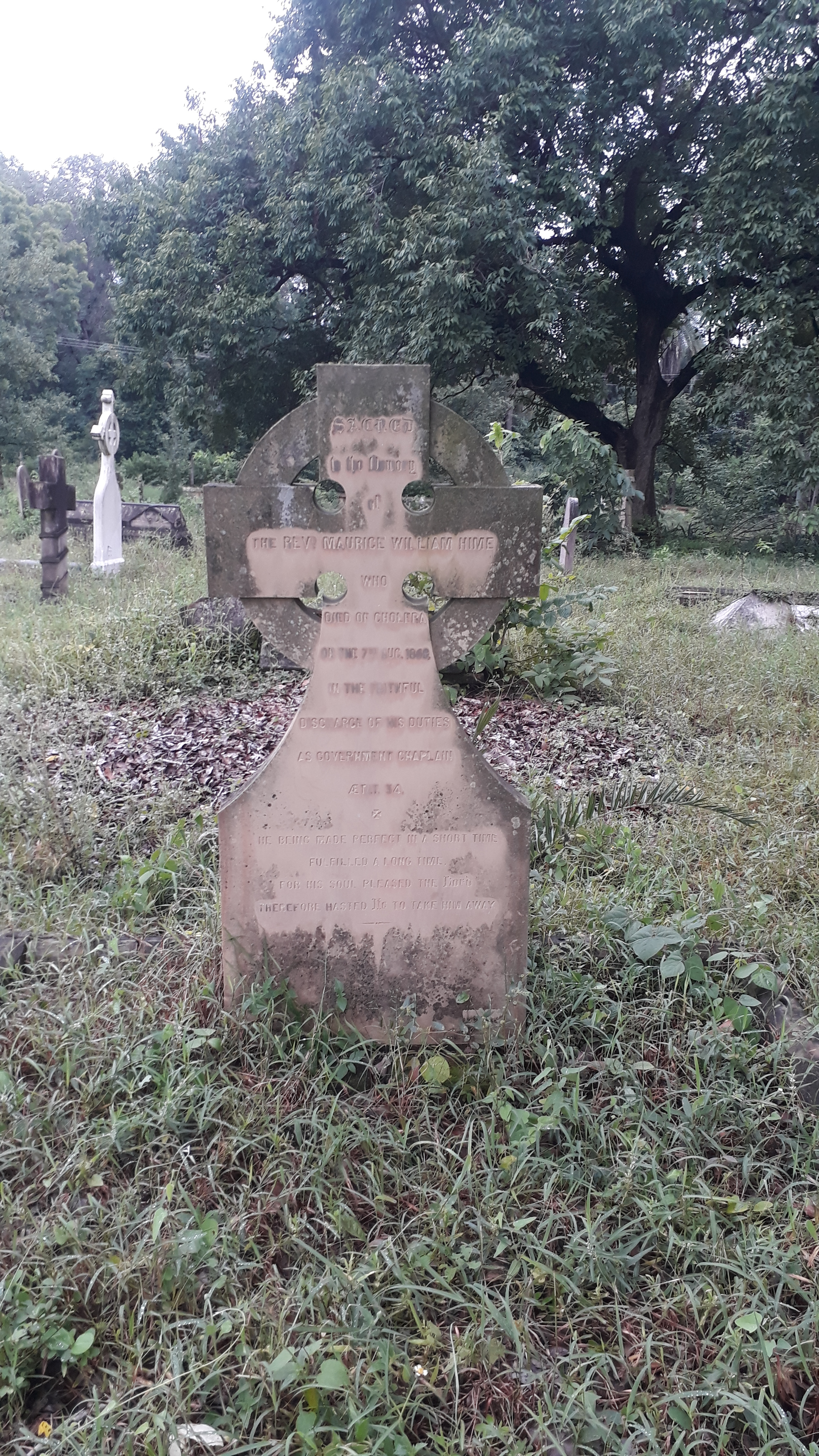
Grave of Rev. Maurice William Hime
