= List of gliders (A) =

This is a list of gliders/sailplanes of the world, (this reference lists all gliders with references, where available) Note: Any aircraft can glide for a short time, but gliders are designed to glide for longer.

== A ==
=== AAK (Akademski Aero Klub, Belgrade) ===
- AAK Pionir IIa

=== AAS ===
(Ateliers Aéronautiques de Suresnes)

- AAS Libération

=== AB Flygindustri ===
- AB Flygindustri Fi-1
- AB Flygindustri Fi-3
- AB Flygindustri Lg 105
- AB Flygindustri G-101 (DFS Schulgleiter SG.38)
- AB Flygindustri Se-104
- AB Flygindustri C-180
- AB Flygindustri C-103

=== AB Flygplan ===
- AB Flygplan Se-102
- AB Flygplan Se-103

=== Abate ===
( U. Abate)

- Abate GP-1

=== Abbott-Baynes Sailplanes Ltd ===
- Abbott Farnham sailplane
- Baynes Bat
- Abbott-Baynes Scud 1
- Abbott-Baynes Scud 2
- Abbott-Baynes Scud 3
- Carden-Baynes Auxiliary

=== Abramov ===
- Abramov BA-3M Sokol
- Abramov VA-3/48 Cupidon 17m span
- Abramov VA-3/48 Dniepr 13.5m span

=== Abrial ===
(Georges Abrial de Pega)

- Levasseur-Abrial A-1
- Abrial A-2 Vautour
- Abrial A-3 Oricou
- Peyret-Abrial A-5 Rapace
- Abrial A-12 Bagoas
- Abrial A-13 Buse
- Abrial Air 5
- Abrial Air 50
- Abrial Air 6
- Abrial Air 65
- Abrial Air 60

=== Abric-Calas ===
(Abric & Calas)

- Abric-Calas 1909 glider

=== ACBA ===
(Aéro Club du Bas Armagnac)

- ACBA 3

=== AC Mulhouse Mure ===
(Aéro Club du Mulhouse)

- AC Mulhouse Mure

=== ACS ===
(Aero-Club Suisse)

- ACS Zögling

=== ACMN ===
(Aéro-Club des Montagnes Neuchâteloises)

- ACMN Caps I - Aéro-Club des Montagnes Neuchâteloises

=== Adair ===
(Ronald Hamilton Adair, Clifford Gurr and H. Zechner)

- Adair Altair

=== Adam ===
(Roger Adam)

- Adam RA-01
- Adam RA-02
- Adam RA-03
- Adam RA-08
- Adam RA-09
- Adam RA-10
- Adam RA-10S
- Adam RA-12
- Adam RA-13

=== Addyman ===
(E.T.W. Addyman)

- Addyman STG
- Addyman Zephyr

=== ADI ===
(Aircraft Designs Inc / Martin Hollman / Winther-Hollman Aircraft Inc.)

- Hollman Condor)
- ADI Condor

=== Adaridi ===
(Boris Adaridi)

- Adaridi SK-24

=== Ader ===
(Clement Ader)

- Ader 1873 glider

=== Adorján ===
- Adorján Libelle

=== Advanced Aeromarine ===
- Advanced Aeromarine Sierra
- Advanced Aeromarine Sierra LS

=== Adventure Aircraft ===
- Adventure Aircraft EMG-6

=== AEA ===
(Aerial Experimental Association)

- AEA 1907 glider

=== Aecherli-Farner ===
(Hermann Aecherli & Willy Farner)

- D.D. Zögling
- Aecherli Pfau 7
- Aecherli Pfau
- Aecherli HAFA-1
- Aecherli HAFA-2
- Aecherli HAFA-3
- Aecherli HAFA-4
- Aecherli HAFA-5
- Aecherli HAFA-6
- Aecherli HAFA-8
- Aecherli HAFA-9
- Aecherli Z-10

=== AER ===
(Aeronautica Rio)

- AER M-100S Pegaso

=== AER Pegaso ===
- AER Pegaso M 100S

=== Aerbul ===
(Aerbul s.r.l. / Horacio Bulacio Campos)

- Aerbul HB-1 Club
- Aerbul HB-2
- Aerbul HB-3
- Aerbul HB-4
- Aerbul HB-5
- Aerbul HB-6

=== Aériane ===
- Aériane Swift

=== Aero Industries Technical Institute ===
- Aero Industries Technical Institute G-2
- Aero Industries Technical Institute TG-31

=== Aero Vodochody ===
- Aero A.17
- Aero VT 100 Démant
- Aero Ae-53

=== Aero-Club Suisse ===
- Ae.C.S. Zögling

=== AeroJaén ===
(Aeronaútica del Jaén SA)

- AeroJaén RF5-AJ1 Serrania
- AeroJaén AJ-1 Serrania

=== Aerola ===
(Also known as Aeros)

- Aerola AL-12
- Aerola AL-12M
- Aerola AC-21
- Aerola Alatus
- Aerola Alatus-M
- Aerola Alatus ME

=== Aeromere ===
- Aeromere M-100S
- Aeromere M-100

=== Aeromot ===
- Aeromot AMT-100 Ximango
- Aeromot AMT-200 Super Ximango
- Aeromot AMT-300 Turbo Ximango Shark (motor glider)
- Aeromot AMT-600 Guri

=== Aeronca ===
- Aeronca C.2 glider
- Aeronca TG-5

=== Aeros ===
see:Aerola

=== Aérostructure ===
(Aérostructure SARL)

- Aérostructure Lutin 80

=== Aerotalleres ===
- Aerotaller E-38

=== Aerotechnik ===
(designer: Karel Dlouhy)

- Aerotechnik L-13 SDL Vivat
- Aerotechnik L-13 SL Vivat
- Aerotechnik L-13 SW Vivat
- Aerotechnik L-13 SE Vivat
- Aerotechnik L-13SDM Vivat
- Aerotechnik L-113

=== AeroXpert ===
(AeroXpert, Hennopsmeer / Peter Cellier & François Jordaan)

- AeroXpert AX-1

=== AGA ===
(AGA Aviation)

- AGA Aviation LRG – USN amphibious twin hull transport glider

=== Agusta ===
(Giovanni Agusta)

- Agusta glider

=== Ahrens ===
(Ahrens Aircraft Corporation)

- Ahrens AR 124

=== Aiello ===
(Eugenio Aiello)

- Aiello 1
- Aiello 2

=== AII ===
(Aviation Industries of Iran)

- AII AVA-101

=== Aircraft Cooperative Mechta ===
- Fedorov Baïkal
- Aviastroitel AC-4 Russia
- Fedorov Istra
- Fedorov Mechta I

=== Air Energy ===
- Air Energy AE-1 Silent

=== Air Est Services ===
- Air Est Goeland
- Air Est JCD 03 Pelican

=== Airdisco ===
(Aircraft Disposal Company)

- Airdisco Phi-Phi – Aircraft Disposal Company

=== Airmate ===
See: Schreder

=== Airspeed Ltd ===
- Airspeed Tern
- Airspeed AS.51 Horsa
- Airspeed AS.52
- Airspeed AS.53 Horsa
- Airspeed AS.58 Horsa II

=== AISA ===
(Émile Dewoitine / Aeronáutica Industrial S.A.)

- Iberavia IP-2
- Iberavia IE-02

=== Aizsardze ===
- Aizsardze

=== Akaflieg Berlin ===
(FFG Berlin / Akaflieg Berlin)

- Akaflieg Berlin B 1 "Charlotte"
- Akaflieg Berlin B 2 "Teufelchen"
- Akaflieg Berlin B 3 "Charlotte II"
- Akaflieg Berlin B 5
- Akaflieg Berlin B 6
- Akaflieg Berlin B 8
- Akaflieg Berlin B 11
- Akaflieg Berlin B 12
- Akaflieg Berlin B 13

=== Akaflieg Braunschweig ===
- Akaflieg Braunschweig SB-01 Storch
- Akaflieg Braunschweig SB-02 Brockenhexe
- Akaflieg Braunschweig SB-03
- Akaflieg Braunschweig SB-04
- Akaflieg Braunschweig SB-5 Danzig
- Akaflieg Braunschweig SB-6 Nixope
- Akaflieg Braunschweig SB-7 Nimbus
- Akaflieg Braunschweig SB-8
- Akaflieg Braunschweig SB-9 Stratus
- Akaflieg Braunschweig SB-10 Schirokko
- Akaflieg Braunschweig SB-11
- Akaflieg Braunschweig SB-12
- Akaflieg Braunschweig SB-13 Arcus
- Akaflieg Braunschweig SB-14
- Akaflieg Braunschweig SB-15

=== Akaflieg Danzig ===
(Akademische Fliegergruppe T. H. Danzig)

- Akaflieg Danzig Boot-Danzig
- Akaflieg Danzig Libelle

=== Akaflieg Darmstadt ===
- Akaflieg Darmstadt D-1
- Akaflieg Darmstadt D-2 Pumpelmeise
- Akaflieg Darmstadt D-3 Nolleputzchen
- Akaflieg Darmstadt D-4 Edith
- Akaflieg Darmstadt D-5 Flohschwanz
- Akaflieg Darmstadt D-6 Geheimrat
- Akaflieg Darmstadt D-7 Margarete
- Akaflieg Darmstadt D-8 Karl der Große
- Akaflieg Darmstadt D-9 Konsul
- Akaflieg Darmstadt D-10 Hessen / Piepmatz
- Akaflieg Darmstadt D-11 Mohamed
- Akaflieg Darmstadt D-12 Römryke Berge
- Akaflieg Darmstadt D-13 Mohamed II
- Akaflieg Darmstadt D-15 Westpreußen
- Akaflieg Darmstadt D-17 Darmstadt and Chanute
- Akaflieg Darmstadt D-19 Darmstadt II
- Akaflieg Darmstadt D-20 Starkenburg
- Akaflieg Darmstadt D-28 Windspiel
- Akaflieg Darmstadt D-30 Cirrus
- Akaflieg Darmstadt D-31
- Akaflieg Darmstadt D-32
- Akaflieg Darmstadt D-33 (Lippisch / Heinemann DM-1)
- Akaflieg Darmstadt D-34
- Akaflieg Darmstadt D-36 Circe
- Akaflieg Darmstadt D-37 Artemis
- Akaflieg Darmstadt D-38
- Akaflieg Darmstadt D-39
- Akaflieg Darmstadt D-40
- Akaflieg Darmstadt D-41
- Akaflieg Darmstadt D-42
- Akaflieg Darmstadt D-43
- Akaflieg Darmstadt Schloss Mainberg
- FSV Darmstadt FSV 10

==== Akaflieg Darmstadt/Akaflieg München ====
- Akaflieg Darmstadt/Akaflieg München DM.1
- Akaflieg Darmstadt/Akaflieg München DM.2
- Akaflieg Darmstadt/Akaflieg München DM.3
- Akaflieg Darmstadt/Akaflieg München DM.4

=== Akaflieg Dresden ===
- Akaflieg Dresden D-B1 Sehaufchen
- Akaflieg Dresden D-B2 Doris
- Akaflieg Dresden D-B3
- Akaflieg Dresden D-B4
- Akaflieg Dresden D-B5
- Akaflieg Dresden D-B6
- Akaflieg Dresden D-B7
- Akaflieg Dresden D-B8
- Akaflieg Dresden D-B9
- Akaflieg Dresden D-B10
- Akaflieg Dresden D-B11

=== Akaflieg Graz ===
(Akademischen Segelfliegergruppe Graz)

- Graz G-20 Roland
- Graz G-23 Fliegendes Ei
- Graz G-25
- Graz G-26
- Graz G-27
- Graz G-28 Mücke
- Graz Graz
- Graz Graz II
- Graz Musger G-24
- Graz Oswald
- Graz Pagat
- Graz PN-1 Benjamin
- Graz Schöckelfalke
- Graz Sturmvogel
- Graz Vandale
- Graz VL-1 Maulwurf I
- Graz VL-1 Maulwurf II
- Graz VL-2 Kef
- Graz VL-3 Kauz
- Graz Zögling Hugin
- Graz Zögling Konrad
- Graz-Musger Mg-19S

=== Akaflieg Hannover ===
(for Hannoverische Waggonfabrik gliders see:Hannover)

- Akaflieg Hannover AFS 1 Schnecke
- Akaflieg Hannover AFH 2
- Akaflieg Hannover AFH 3
- Akaflieg Hannover AFH 4
- Akaflieg Hannover AFH 5
- Akaflieg Hannover AFH 6
- Akaflieg Hannover AFH 8
- Akaflieg Hannover AFH 10
- Akaflieg Hannover AFH 11
- Akaflieg Hannover AFH 17
- Akaflieg Hannover AFH 21 (Neukom Elfe S4d constructed by students)
- Akaflieg Hannover AFH-22
- Akaflieg Hannover AFH-24
- Akaflieg Hannover AFH 26
- Akaflieg Hannover Moritz
- Akaflieg Hannover Spatz – built by Hannoversche Waggonfabrik A.G., Hannover
- Akaflieg Hannover Strolch – Karl Bremer

=== Akaflieg Karlsruhe ===
- Akaflieg Karlsruhe HL-28 Bliemchen Brigant – built by SGK (Segelflieger Gruppe Karlsruhe)
- Akaflieg Karlsruhe AK-1 Mischl self-launching sailplane
- Akaflieg Karlsruhe AK-2
- Akaflieg Karlsruhe AK-5 Ardea
- Akaflieg Karlsruhe AK-5b Otto K.K.
- Akaflieg Karlsruhe AK-8
- Akaflieg Karlsruhe DG-1000J Turbine

=== Akaflieg Köln ===
- Akaflieg Köln AFK-1

=== Akaflieg Marcho-Silesia ===
- Schlesien in Not

=== Akaflieg München ===
- Akaflieg München Mü1 Vogel Roch
- Akaflieg München Mü2 Münchner Kindl
- Akaflieg München Mü3 Kakadu
- Akaflieg München Mü4 München
- Akaflieg München Mü5 Wastl
- Akaflieg München Mü6
- Akaflieg München Mü7
- Akaflieg München Mü10 Milan
- Akaflieg München Mü11 Papagei
- Akaflieg München Mü12 Kiwi
- Akaflieg München Mü13 Merlin / Atlante
- Akaflieg München Mü15
- Akaflieg München Mü16
- Akaflieg München Mü17 Merle
- Akaflieg München Mü18 Meßkrähe
- Akaflieg München Mü19
- Akaflieg München Mü20
- Akaflieg München Mü21
- Akaflieg München Mü22
- Akaflieg München Mü23 Saurier
- Akaflieg München Mü24
- Akaflieg München Mü25
- Akaflieg München Mü26
- Akaflieg München Mü27
- Akaflieg München Mü28
- Akaflieg München Mü31

=== Akaflieg Stuttgart ===
- Akaflieg Stuttgart F.1 Fledermaus
- Akaflieg Stuttgart fs16 Wipperstertz (Heide)
- Akaflieg Stuttgart fs17
- Akaflieg Stuttgart fs18a
- Akaflieg Stuttgart fs19
- Akaflieg Stuttgart fs20 [Project] Spring 1939, powered FS-17 devel.
- Akaflieg Stuttgart fs21 [Project] 1952 completion of revised FS-19
- Akaflieg Stuttgart fs22 [Project] 2-seat glider, trapezoidal wing, span 18 m
- Akaflieg Stuttgart fs23 Hidalgo
- Akaflieg Stuttgart fs24 Phönix
- Akaflieg Stuttgart fs25 Cuervo
- Akaflieg Stuttgart fs26 Moseppl
- Akaflieg Stuttgart fs29 TF
- Akaflieg Stuttgart fs31
- Akaflieg Stuttgart fs32 Aguila
- Akaflieg Stuttgart fs33 Gavilán
- Akaflieg Stuttgart fs34 Albatros
- Akaflieg Stuttgart fs35
- Akaflieg Stuttgart Icaré 1
- Akaflieg Stuttgart Icaré 2
- Akaflieg Stuttgart I (FVA 4)
- Akaflieg Stuttgart II (FVA Fox)
- Akaflieg Stuttgart LS 1 1926 'Roter Rand' = 'Red Edge', training glider, span 14 m'
- Akaflieg Stuttgart LS 2 1928 primary training glider, span 13 m, supervised by E Bachem & A Protzen

=== Akaflieg Wien ===
- Akaflieg Wien AFW-8

=== Akasiya Mokko ===
- Shindo Cirrus 2

=== Akira ===
(Myahara Akira)

- Akira 2C (日本式鳳2型)
- Akira Brume de chaleur (日本式かげろう型)

=== AK Zagreb ===
- AK Zagreb Borongaj

=== Akerboom-Schmidt ===
(J. Akerboom & J. Schmidt / Nijs & Van Driel)

- Akerboom-Schmidt T-10 I
- Akerboom-Schmidt T-10 II
- Akerboom-Schmidt T-10 III
- Akerboom-Schmidt T-10
- Akerboom-Schmidt T-20

=== Älands Flygklubb ===
- Älands Flygklubb glider

=== Alanne ===
(Pentti Alanne)

- Alanne Motorlerche

=== Albastar Ltd ===
- Albastar A1
- Albastar Apis
- Albastar Sinus
- Albastar Apis 15
- Wezel Apis 2 Martin WEZEL

=== Albatros ===
(Club Argentino de Planeadores Albatros / Alberto Rosmarin, Vito Antonio Ernesto Vignera & Jorge Ubaldo Pallich )

- Albatros 1
- Albatros 8-T-1 Jorge Newbery
- Giannoni Albatros 3-E-2
- Bertoni-Altinger BA-1 Superalbatros

=== Albatros Vrabac ===
- Albatros Vrabac A

=== Albini-Cella-Facciolo-Moltrasio ===
(Albini, Cella, Facciolo, Moltrasio)

- Albini-Cella-Facciolo-Moltrasio Zögling biposto

=== Aldasoro-Suárez ===
(Juan-Pablo Aldasoro-Suárez & Eduardo Aldasoro-Suárez - Real del Monte, Estado de Hidalgo, México)

- Aldasoro-Suárez 1909 glider

=== Alexander ===
(Albert W. Mooney / Alexander Aircraft Co, Colorado Springs (Colorado, USA)

- Alexander B-1

=== Alfaro ===
- Alfaro ACA 1910

=== Alfieri ===
(A. Alfieri)

- Alfieri AT-1 Alcyone

=== Alise (glider constructor) ===
- Alise (glider)

=== Alisport ===
(Alisport srl, Cremella, Italy)

- Alisport Silent
- Alisport Silent Club
- Alisport Silent 2
- Alisport Silent 2 Electro
- Alisport Silent 2 A302efi
- Alisport Silent 2 Targa
- Alisport Silent 2 Targa A302
- Alisport Silent Club A302efi
- Alisport Yuma

=== Allen ===
(Aeronautical Engineering Society, New-York / E. Allen & E.P. Warner)

- Allen AES-1
- Allen AES-2

=== Allgeier ===
(Josef Allgeier)

- Allgaier Geier

=== Allied ===
(Allied Aviation)

- Allied Aviation LRA
- Allied Aviation LR2A

=== Allievo ===
- Allievo Milano
- Allievo Roma

=== Allstar ===
(Allstar PZL Glider Sp. z o.o.)

- Allstar SZD-50-3 Puchacz
- Allstar SZD-51-1 Junior
- Allstar SZD-54 Perkoz
- Allstar SZD-59 Acro
- Allstar SZD-55-1

=== Alpaero ===
- Alpaero Sirius

=== Alpla ===
(Alpla-Werke / Alpla-Werken Alvin Lehner OHG)

- Alpla AVo 60 Samburo
- Alpla AVo 68 Samburo a.k.a. M&D A Vo 68 Samburo

=== Alsema ===
(Piet Alsema)

- Alsema Sagitta

=== Altinger ===
(Raúl Altinger & Theo Altinger)

- Altinger TA-1
- Altinger TA-2
- Altinger TA-3
- Altinger TA-4 Lenticular
- Altinger TA-5 Biguá
- Altinger TA-6
- Altinger TA-7 Yarará
- Altinger TA-8
- Altinger TA-12
- Altinger TA-15S Lenticular
- Altinger TA 24 Caracolero
- Altinger-Bertoni Super Albatross

=== Anczutin-Malinowski-Aleksandrowicz ===
(AMA - Andrzej Anczutin, Henryk Malinowski & Rościsław Aleksandrowicz / Université Technique de Varsovie & Ateliers de Construction aéronautique d'Antoni Kocjan)

- AMA Motoszybowiec

=== AmEagle ===
(AmEagle Corporation, aka* AmEagle American Eaglet)

- AmEagle Eaglet

=== American Falcon ===
- American Falcon (sailplane)

=== American Spirit (glider constructor) ===
- American Spirit XL

=== AMF ===
(AMF Microlight)

- AMF Chevvron 2-32C

=== AMS Flight ===
- Glaser-Dirks DG-303 Elan
- Glaser-Dirks DG-500
- Glaser-Dirks DG-505 Orion
- AMS Carat motorglider

=== Amstutz ===
(L. Lergier & Blaser / E. Amstutz, H. Belart & H. von Travel, Bern)

- Amstutz Thun

=== ANB ===
( Pytor Almurzin, Nikitin & Bogatov)

- ANB-M
- ANB-I

=== Andersson ===
(A.J. Andersson / Augsburger V.L.)

- Andersson Datschi

=== Andrews ===
(Kenneth Edwin Andrews)

- Andrews 1930 Glider

=== Andrews ===
(Kenneth Edwin Andrews)

- Andrews 1930 glider

=== ANEC ===
(W. S. SHACKLETON / Air Navigation and Engineering Company)

- ANEC 1

=== Anotchenko ===
(N.D. Anotchenko a.k.a. Anoschenko ND Macaque)

- Anotchenko Makaka

=== Ansaldo ===
(José María Ansaldo)

- Ansaldo Fabi

=== Antoni brothers Antoni ===
(Antoni brothers)

- Antoni Volumano

=== Antonov ===
(Oleg K. Antonov / Antonov Design Bureau(OKB))

- Antonov Standard-1 (Стандарт-1)
- Antonov Standard-2 (Стандарт-2)
- Antonov U-s1 (У-с1) – Uchebnyi (Учебный – "Trainer")
- Antonov U-s2 (У-с2) – first version built in series – Uchebnyi (Учебный – "Trainer")
- Antonov U-s3 (У-с3) – 1,600 built – Uchebnyi (Учебный – "Trainer")
- Antonov U-s4 (У-с4), redesignated A-1 – major production version – Uchebnyi (Учебный – "Trainer")(3000 built)
- Antonov U-s5 (У-с5)
- Antonov U-s6 (У-с6)
- Antonov P-s1 (П-с1) – Paritel' (Паритель – "Sailplane")aka Upar (Упар, portmanteau of uchebnyi paritel' – учебный паритель – "training sailplane")
- Antonov P-s2 (П-с2) – Paritel' (Паритель – "Sailplane")aka Upar (Упар, portmanteau of uchebnyi paritel' – учебный паритель – "training sailplane") – licence built as the THK-4 in Turkey
- Antonov B-s3 (Б-с3) – Buksirovochnye (Буксировочные – "Towed")
- Antonov B-s4 (Б-с4) – Buksirovochnye (Буксировочные – "Towed")
- Antonov B-s5 (Б-с5) – Buksirovochnye (Буксировочные – "Towed")
- Antonov RF-1 Rot Front
- Antonov RF-2 Rot Front
- Antonov RF-3 Rot Front
- Antonov RF-4 Rot Front
- Antonov RF-5 Rot Front
- Antonov RF-6 Rot Front
- Antonov RF-7 Rot Front (red front)
- Antonov RF-8 Rot Front
- Antonov A-1
- Antonov A-2
- Antonov A-3 Molodv
- Antonov A-7 aka RF-8
- Antonov A-9
- Antonov A-10 version of A-9
- Antonov A-11
- Antonov A-13
- Antonov A-15
- Antonov A-40 a.k.a. KT – Krylya Tanka – Flying Tank
- Antonov E-153
- Antonov M-1
- Antonov M-3
- Antonov M-4
- Antonov M-5
- Antonov OKA-1 Golub ("Dove")
- Antonov OKA-2
- Antonov OKA-3
- Antonov OKA-5 Standard-2
- Antonov OKA-6 Gorod Lenina (City of Lenin)
- Antonov OKA-7 Bubik
- Antonov OKA-11 (PS-1 training glider)
- Antonov OKA-12 (PS-2 training glider)
- Antonov OKA-13 Chest Uslovii Stalina ("Stalin's six conditions")
- Antonov OKA-14 DIP ("Dognat i peregnat") ("Catch up and overtake")
- Antonov OKA-17 (RF-1 experimental glider) (1933)
- Antonov OKA-18 (RF-2 experimental glider) (1933)
- Antonov OKA-19 (RF-3 experimental glider) (1933)
- Antonov OKA-20 (RF-4 experimental glider) (1933)
- Antonov OKA-21 (apparently based on OKA-14) (1933)
- Antonov OKA-23 RF-5 experimental glider (1934)
- Antonov OKA-24 M-3 experimental glider (1934)
- Antonov OKA-28 RF-6 experimental glider
- Antonov OKA-29 M-4 experimental glider
- Antonov OKA-30 M-5 experimental glider (1936)
- Antonov OKA-31 BS-5 training glider (1936)
- Antonov OKA-32 US-5 training glider (1936)
- Antonov OKA-33 (LEM-2 motor glider)
- Antonov Amur
- Antonov DIP
- Antonov IP experimental glider
- Antonov Golub
- Antonov Staline 1
- Antonov Staline 5
- Antonov E153 Masha

=== Antykacap ===
- Antykacap

=== Apogs ===
- Apogs

=== Applebay Sailplanes ===
- Applebay GA-II Chiricahua
- Applebay GA-111 Mescalero
- Applebay Zia
- Applebay Zuni

=== Ara ===
(Agence Rethéloise d'Aviation)

- Ara 1930 primary

=== Archdeacon ===
(Ernest Archdeacon)

- Archdeacon 1904 glider (1)
- Archdeacon 1904 glider (2)
- Archdeacon 1905 glider
- Archdeacon-Voisin 1905 glider

=== Armstrong-Whitworth ===
- Armstrong-Whitworth A.W.52G

=== ARMV-2 ===
(Atelierele de Reparatii Material Volant-2 – Pipera)

- ARMV-2 CT-2 – Traian Costǎchescu
- ARMV-2 OP-2 – Ovidiu Popa
- ARMV-2 GP-2 – Octavian Giuncu & Ovidiu Popa

=== Armytage ===
(Norman Armytage)

- Armytage 1929 glider

=== Arplam ===
(All Reinforced Plastic Mouldings / Leuvense university Aero Club)

- Arplam Leuvense L-1

=== Arsenal ===
(Arsenal de l'Aéronautique)

- Air 100
- Air 101
- Air 102
- Arsenal 4111
- Arsenal 1301
- Arsenal 2301
- Arsenal Guerchais-Roche SA-103 Emouchet
- Arsenal S.A.104 Emouchet
- Arsenal S.A 104 Emouchet Escopette
- Arsenal SA.110 Eider

=== Arup ===
(Arup Inc (fdr: Cloyd L Snyder), 231 Lincoln Way, South Bend IN.)

- Arup S-1

=== Arzeulov ===
(K.K. Arzeulov)

- Arzeulov A-1
- Arzeulov A-2
- Arzeulov A-3
- Arzeulov A-5

=== ASC ===
(Advanced Soaring Concepts / Jensen Tor)

- ASC Falcon
- ASC Spirit
- ASC Test
- ASC Apex

=== Ashfield ===
(R. J. Ashfield)

- Ashfield Kl Biplane

=== ASUP ===
(Ugo Abate & Giovanni Pirelli / ASUP / Fratelli Visco, Somma Lombardo)

- ASUP 1924 glider
- ASUP GP-1

=== Ateliers Vosgiens ===
- Ateliers Vosgiens 1909 glider

=== Aubiet ===
(Marceau Aubiet)

- Aubiet 1922 glider

=== Auburn ===
(Robert J. Auburn)

- Auburn Sun Spot

=== August ===
(Henry August)

- August 1909 glider

=== Aurora ===
(Aurora Training Sailplane Project)

- Aurora TBD

=== Auseklis ===
- Auseklis (glider)

=== AVF ===
(Akademiya Vozdushnogo Flota - Air Fleet Academy)

- AVF-01 Aral
- AVF-03 Mastyazhart
- AVF-04 Rabfakovets – АВФ-4 Рабфаковец
- AVF-05 Mastyazhart-2 – АВФ-5 Мастяжарт-2
- AVF-06
- AVF-07 Strekoea-pechatnitsa – АВФ-7 Стрекоэа-печатница
- AVF-08 Condor – АВФ-8 Кондор
- Denisov AVF-09 Krasvoenlet
- AVF-10 – АВФ-10
- AVF-11 Komsomolets – АВФ-11 Комсомолец
- AVF-12 KIM – АВФ-12 КИМ
- AVF-13 Bis – АВФ-13 бис
- AVF-13 Larionich – АВФ-13 Ларионыч
- AVF-14 1924 URSS Planeur
- AVF-16 Aeo – АВФ-16 ЭАП
- AVF-17 Une Nuit – АВФ-17 Одна ночъ
- AVF-18 Pionnier – АВФ-18 Пионер
- AVF-19 – Бураго АВФ-19
- AVF-21 Moskau
- AVF-23 Krasnaia Presnia
- AVF-34

=== Avia ===
- Avia LM-02

=== AVIA ===
(Ateliers vosgiens d'industrie aéronautique)

- AVIA X-A
- AVIA XI-A
- AVIA XV-A
- AVIA XX-A
- AVIA 11A (XIA ?)
- AVIA 15A (XVA ?)
- AVIA 22A
- AVIA 30E
- AVIA 32E
- AVIA 40P
- AVIA 41P
- AVIA 50MP
- AVIA 60MP
- AVIA 151A
- AVIA 152A

=== A.V.I.A. ===
(Azionaria Vercellese Industrie Aeronautiche – Francis Lombardi)

- AVIA FL.3
- AVIA LM.02

=== Aviad ===
(Aviad Francesco Di Martino)

- Aviad Zigolo MG12

=== Aviafiber ===
see:Farner

=== Avialsa ===
- Avialsa 60 Fauconnet

=== Aviamilano ===
(Aviamilano Costruzione Aeronautiche)

- Aviamilano A2 Standard
- Aviamilano A3
- Aviamilano CPV1

=== Aviastroitel ===
- Aviastroitel AC-4 Russia Россия АС-4
- Aviastroitel AC-4M
- Aviastroitel AC-5K
- Aviastroitel AC-5M
- Aviastroitel AC-5MP
- Aviastroitel AC-6
- Aviastroitel AC-7
- Aviastroitel AC-7K
- Aviastroitel AC-7M
- Aviastroitel AC-8

=== Aviatrust ===
- Aviatrust Moskau
- Aviatrust Rote Presnia
