= Abrial =

Abrial is a surname. Notable people with the surname include:

- André Joseph Abrial (1750–1828), French politician
- Comte André-Pierre-Etienne Abrial (born 1783), general police chief in Lyon under Napoleon I
- Georges Abrial (1898–1970), French aerodynamicist
- Jean-Marie Charles Abrial (1879–1962), French admiral during World War II
- Jean-Raymond Abrial (1938–2025), French computer scientist and creator of the Z notation and the B-Method
- General Stéphane Abrial, French air force general
- Thibault Abrial, French guitarist

== See also ==
- Abrial A-12 Bagoas, experimental glider
- Abrial A-3 Oricou, two-seat touring airplane
- Abrial A-2 Vautour, single-seat sailplane
