= Addyman =

Addyman may refer to:

- Brian Addyman, a fictional character in the British ITV soap opera Emmerdale
- Caroline Addyman, a fictional character in the British ITV soap opera Emmerdale
- Katie Sugden (AKA Addyman), a fictional character in the British ITV soap opera Emmerdale
- Peter Addyman (born 1939), British archaeologist
- Addyman STG, a British single-seat glider which first flew in 1934, designed by Erik T. W. Addyman
- Addyman Zephyr, a British single-seat sailplane which first flew in 1933, designed by Erik T. W. Addyman
