= Abrial A-13 Buse =

General information
- Type: Glider
- National origin: France
- Designer: Georges Abrial
- Status: prototype

The Abrial A-13 Buse was a tailless glider prototype that was designed in 1954. It was the last in a series of glider aircraft designed by Georges Abrial.

== Design ==
The glider featured a short fuselage with a single, non-tapered strut-braced straight wing. The design had been demonstrated by very complete tests carried out on a 1:10 scale model at the Eiffel Laboratory but no full-size version was ever constructed.

== Specifications Abrial A-13 Buse ==
Data from retroplane

General characteristics

- Capacity: 1
- Wingspan: 13 m (42 ft 8 in)
- Wing area: 10 m^{2} (110 sq ft)
- Aspect ratio: 16.9
- Airfoil: Abrial / STAé 230-231
- Empty weight: 120 kg (265 lb)

== See also ==
Related development

- Abrial A-2 Vautour
- Abrial A-3 Oricou
- Abrial A-12 Bagoas
