= Akaflieg München Mü15 =

German two-seat glider, 1940

Mü15
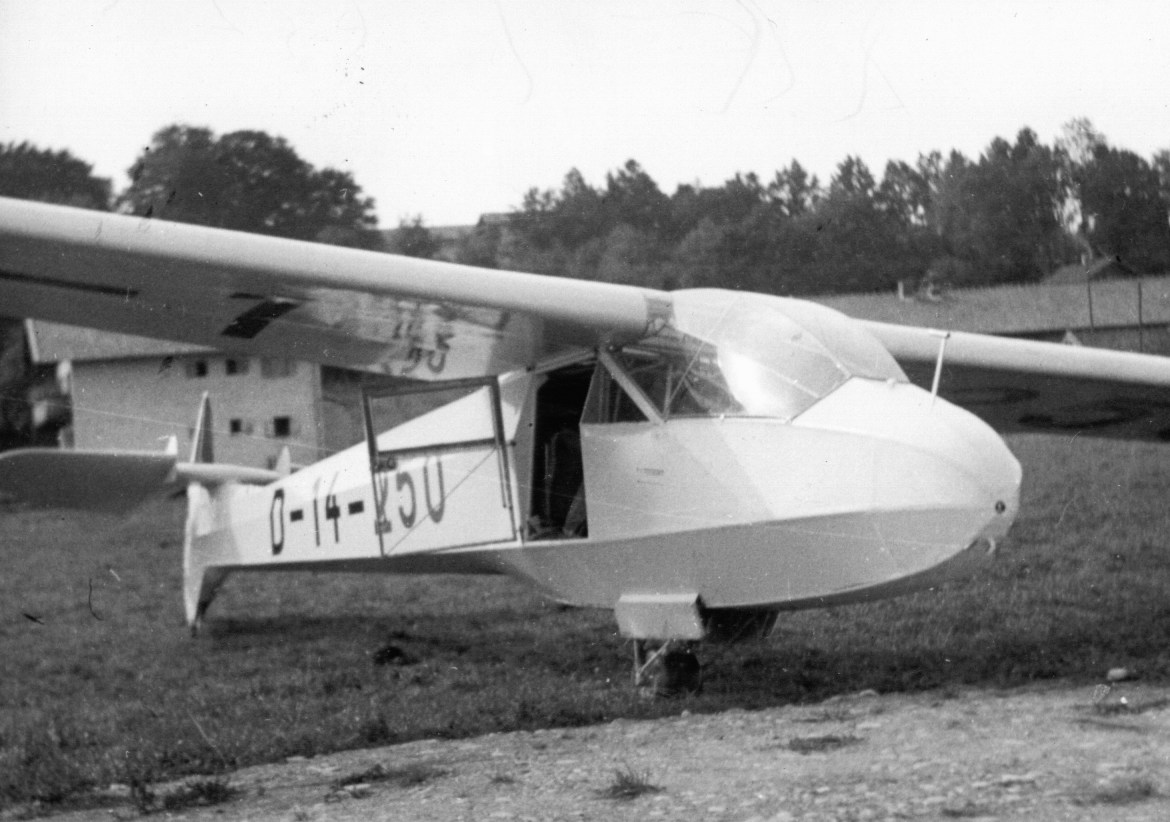
- The Mü15 illustrating the instructor's access door, windows and retractable undercarriage.

General information
- Type: Sailplane
- National origin: Germany
- Manufacturer: Akaflieg München
- Number built: 1

History
- First flight: November 1940
- Retired: November 1941

The Akaflieg München Mü15 was a two-seat glider designed and built in Germany in the late 1930s, loosely based on the Mü10. A longer span version, the Akaflieg München Mü20 was still in the design stages when further work was abandoned.

== Development ==
Germany had established Akademische Fliegerschule at several universities after World War I. The first and lead group was established in Berlin, but one of the most prolific, up to World War II, was Akaflieg München.

The Akaflieg München Mü15 was a high-performance, two-seat glider loosely based on the Akaflieg München Mü10 Milan, with flaps and a retractable main undercarriage. Following a similar construction method to the early Akaflieg München gliders, the Mü15 was constructed using a welded steel tube fuselage covered by wooden longerons with aircraft fabric covering and conventional wooden wings, with plywood skinning back to the main spar and fabric aft. The trailing edges of the wings were taken up by steel-framed fabric covered flaps and ailerons, all deflectable to improve thermalling and approach control. DFS style spoilers, on upper and lower surfaces, were fitted for approach control. The Mü15 had long-span wings, a long fuselage with a large fin and rudder. This arrangement from Egon Scheibe became known as the Schüle München - Munich School. The pilot sat forward of the wing under a long built-up canopy, affording excellent visibility. In contrast, the instructor/passenger sat with their head between the wing leading edges, relying on windows either side of the fuselage under the wings for visibility.

=== Mü20 ===
A longer-span, 20 m (66 ft), version of the Mü15 was still in the design stages when further work was abandoned.

== Operational history ==
Like the single-seat Mü13, the performance of the sole Mü15 (D-14-250) was regarded as particularly good, with a glide ratio of 29:1 and the ability to fly at relatively high speeds, due to the slender 'Scheibe Mü' aerofoil section. First flown in 1940, at Ainring in Austria, this aircraft was equipped for blind flying, but had very poor roll response, requiring large application of the oversized rudder to complete turns with much skid. Flown until the exigencies of World War II intervened, the Mü15 had flown a total of 45 hours when flying ceased in November 1941.

== Variants ==
Akaflieg München Mü15
Loosely based on the Mü 10 with 19 m (62 ft) span wings, flaps and a mainwheel.
Akaflieg München Mü20
Further development of the Mü10/Mü15 line with a 20 m (66 ft) span wings and 500 kg (1,102 lb) all-up weight. Design of the Mü20 was almost complete when work was abandoned.

== Specifications (Mü15) ==
Data from Flugzeug-Typenbuch. Handbuch der deutschen Luftfahrt- und Zubehör-Industrie 1944.

General characteristics

- Crew: 2
- Length: 8.2 m (26 ft 11 in)
- Wingspan: 19 m (62 ft 4 in)
- Height: 1.7 m (5 ft 7 in)
- Wing area: 18.8 m^{2} (202 sq ft)
- Length de-rigged: 9.6 m (31 ft)
- Width de-rigged (without tailplane): 1.02 m (3 ft 4 in)
- Width de-rigged (with tailplane): 2.6 m (8 ft 6 in)
- Height de-rigged: 1.5 m (4 ft 11 in)
- Aspect ratio: 19.3
- Airfoil: Scheibe Mü
- Empty weight: 250 kg (551 lb)
- Gross weight: 450 kg (992 lb)

Performance

- Never exceed speed: 200 km/h (120 mph, 110 kn)
- g limits: +8 (ultimate)
- Maximum glide ratio: 29:1 at 80 km/h (50 mph; 43 kn)
- Rate of sink: 0.7 m/s (140 ft/min) at 65 km/h (40 mph; 35 kn)
- Wing loading: 23.95 kg/m^{2} (4.91 lb/sq ft)
