= AB Flygindustri Fi-3 =

Swedish military transport glider

Fi-3
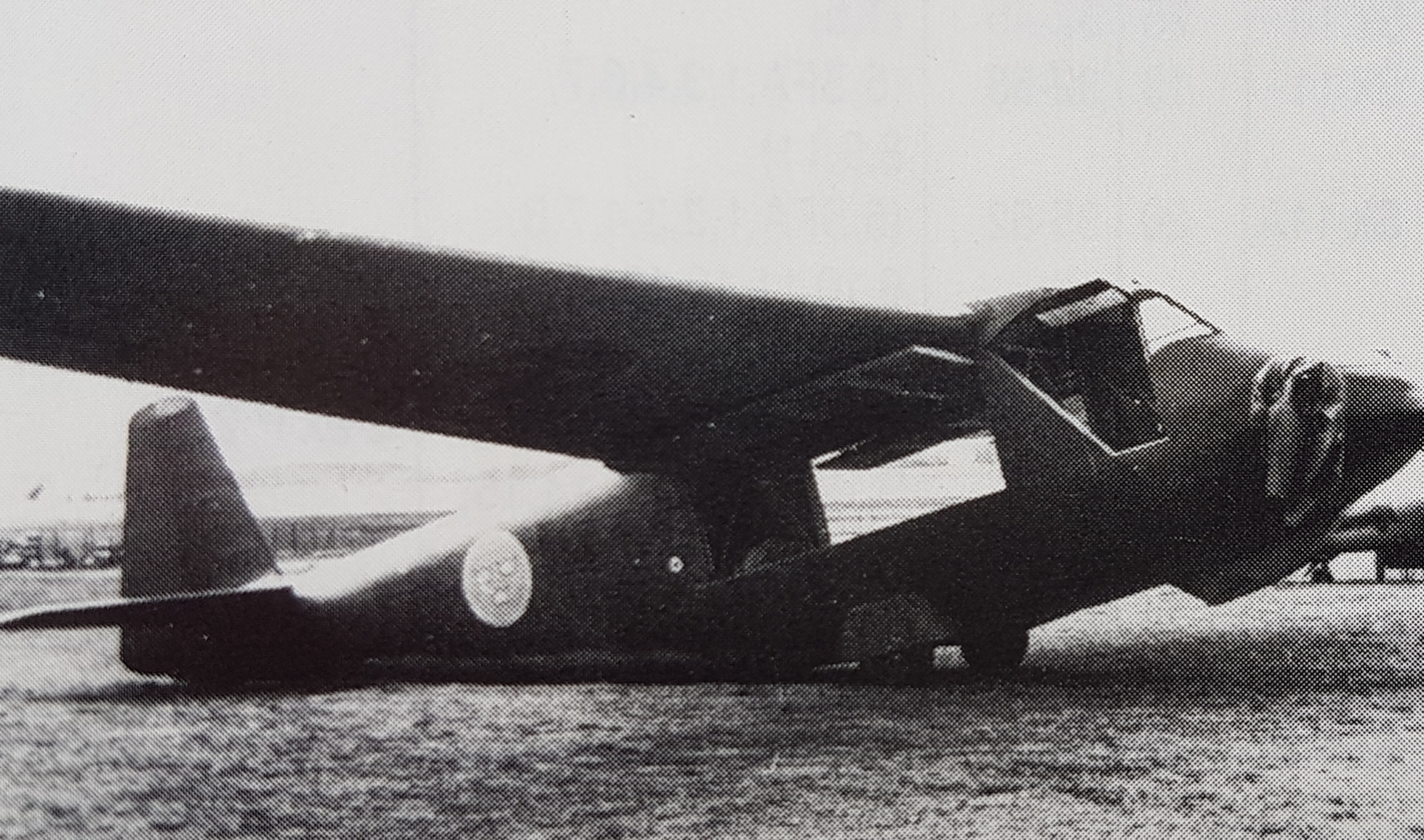

General information
- Type: Transport glider
- National origin: Sweden
- Manufacturer: AB Flygindustri
- Primary user: Swedish Air Force
- Number built: 5

History
- Manufactured: 1944–1945
- First flight: February 1944

The AB Flygindustri Fi-3 was a Swedish military transport glider designed and built during the Second World War for the Swedish Air Force, which designated it the Lg 105. A prototype flew in February 1944, and was followed by four production examples before the end of the war caused the programme to be abandoned.

== Design and development ==
Following the German use of airborne forces during the invasion of France and the Low Countries in May–June 1940 (and in particular the successful assault on the Belgian Fort Ében-Émael by glider-borne troops on 10–11 April), countries around Europe sought to develop their airborne troops, both paratroopers and glider-borne forces. Sweden, although neutral, found itself surrounded by potential hostile neighbours, with Swedish forces too small and poorly equipped to repel any potential invasion by Nazi Germany or the Soviet Union, and sought to build up its armed forces. In 1941, the Swedish Air Force developed a requirement for a transport glider, capable of carrying up to 12 armed men and being towed by a single-engined SAAB 17 bomber.

The company selected to build the new glider was AB Flygindustri of Halmstad, which had been established in 1937 to build German-designed training gliders under license and maintain them. (Note: The is not the same company as the AB Flygindustri based at Malmö between 1924 and 1935) Work began on the new glider, called Fi-3 by AB Flyindustri, and Lg 105 by the Swedish Air Force, in 1942. It was a high-wing monoplane of mixed construction, with the central part of the fuselage, housing the cabin, having a welded steel-tube structure with plywood covering, with most of the rest of the airframe of wooden construction. Two pilots sat side-by-side in an enclosed cockpit, while the main cabin had large upward opening doors for loading and unloading passengers and cargo. The aircraft had a tricycle undercarriage, with a sprung skid under the nose and two mainwheels with balloon tyres attached to the fuselage. Air brakes were fitted to the wings.

== Testing and production ==
The prototype made its first flight, towed by a Northrop 8 (designated B 5 under the Swedish Air Force designation system), in February 1944. The prototype crashed on 28 April 1944, but despite this an order was placed for five Lg 105s. Only four of them had been completed by the end of the war, when the programme was cancelled.

== Specifications ==
Data from Letadla 39–45: AB Flygindustri Fi-3/LG 105

General characteristics

- Crew: 2
- Capacity: 10 troops
- Length: 9.70 m (31 ft 10 in)
- Wingspan: 16.50 m (54 ft 2 in)
- Height: 3.30 m (10 ft 10 in)
- Wing area: 32.00 m^{2} (344.4 sq ft)
- Empty weight: 790 kg (1,742 lb)
- Gross weight: 1,800 kg (3,968 lb)
- Max takeoff weight: 2,100 kg (4,630 lb)

Performance

- Maximum speed: 350 km/h (220 mph, 190 kn) (maximum glide speed), 250 km/h (160 mph; 130 kn) (max tow speed)
- Maximum glide ratio: 1:12

== See also ==
- CAT TM.2
- DFS 230
- Gribovsky G-11
