= Akaflieg München Mü23 Saurier =

Mü23 Saurier
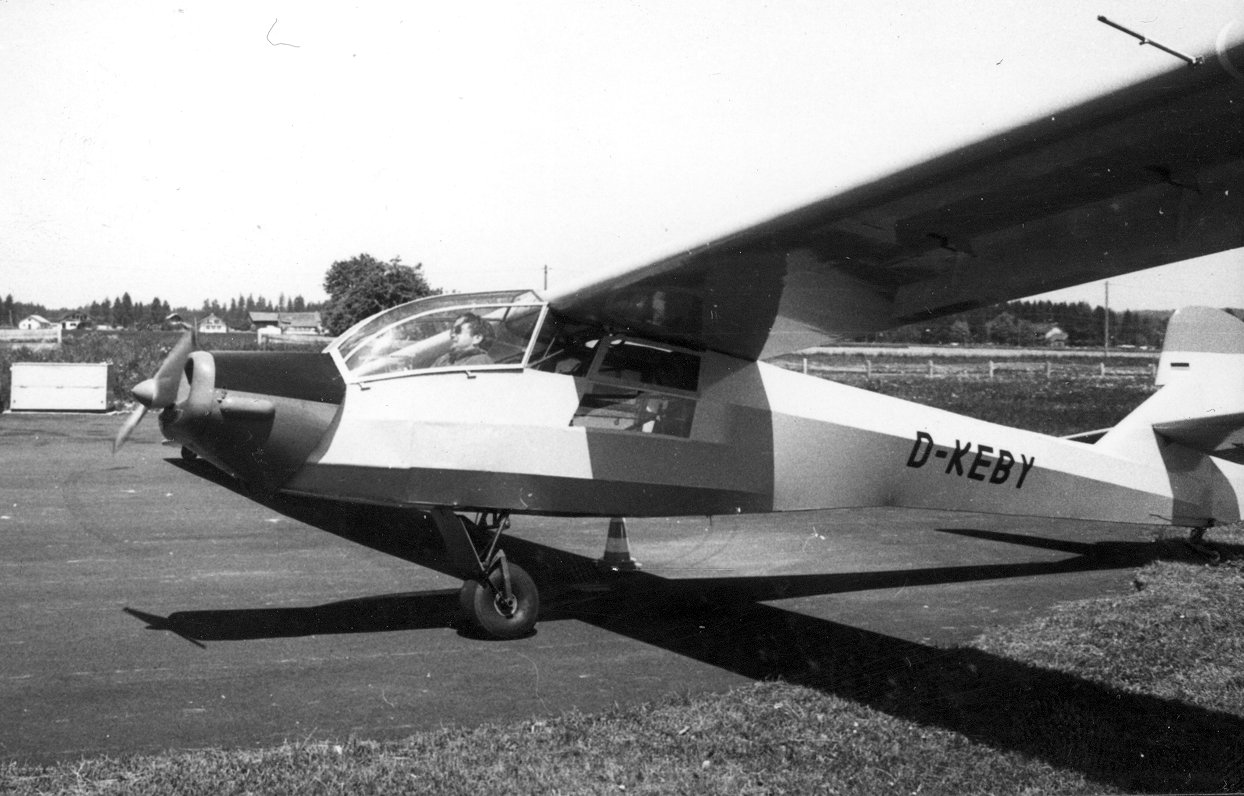

General information
- Type: Motor-Glider
- National origin: Germany
- Manufacturer: Akaflieg München
- Number built: 1

The Akaflieg München Mü23 Saurier is a two-seat motor-glider designed and built in Germany from 1956.

== Development ==
In 1957 the students at Akaflieg München began the design and construction of the Mü23 Saurier motor-glider. Using the classic 'Munich School' construction technique, the Mü23 was built using fabric covered welded steel tube for the fuselage and wooden wings and tail covered with plywood and fabric. The pilot sitting directly behind the engine under a built up transparent canopy and the passenger sitting in a compartment under the centre section of the wing, similar to the seating arrangement of the Akaflieg München Mü10 Milan

Using the Mü Scheibe aerofoil section imbued the Mü23 with excellent low speed characteristics and short landings and takeoffs, but development was slowed by problems with the chosen engines, initially a Volkswagen VW1200, later a Braendle ZB700 and finally a Volkswagen VW1500N which gave satisfactory performance.

Once the performance of the aircraft could be guaranteed with the VW1500N engine, the Mü23 took part in sailplane and motor glider competitions with some success. In 2010 the Mü23 is undergoing restoration.

== Specifications (Mü23 Saurier) ==
Data from Mü23 "Saurier"

General characteristics

- Crew: 1
- Capacity: 1
- Wingspan: 20 m (65 ft 7 in)
- Wing area: 24 m^{2} (258 sq ft)
- Aspect ratio: 16.7
- Airfoil: Mü Scheibe
- Empty weight: 477 kg (1,052 lb)
- Gross weight: 700 kg (1,543 lb)
- Powerplant: 1 × Volkswagen VW1500N , 33.5 kW (45 hp)

Performance Aircraft of comparable role, configuration, and era

- Schleicher ASK-14
