= Akaflieg Stuttgart fs25 =

German single-seat glider, 1968

fs25 Cuervo
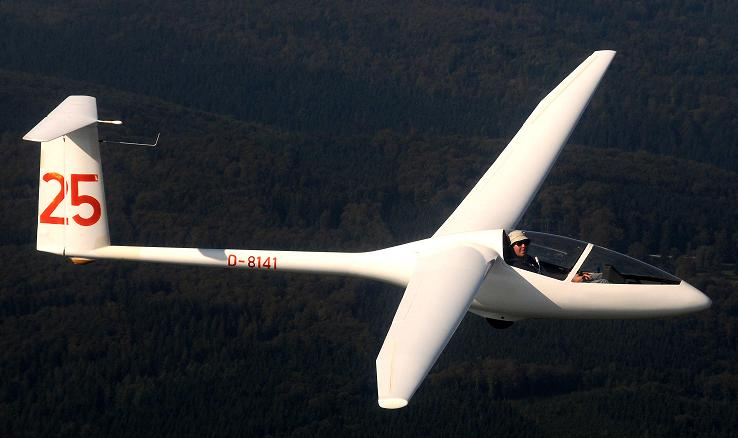

General information
- Type: Glider
- National origin: West Germany
- Manufacturer: Akaflieg Stuttgart
- Number built: 1

History
- First flight: 30 January 1968
- Developed from: Akaflieg Stuttgart fs23 Hidalgo

The Akaflieg Stuttgart fs25, nicknamed Cuervo (Spanish: Raven) is a glider designed and built in Germany from 1968.

== Development ==
With the completion of the fs23 Hidalgo and flight testing it was found that some of the expected results were not forthcoming. Through use of the UNIVAC 1107 computer, at the Institut für Statik und Dynamik of the University of Stuttgart, there was found to be no possible improvement of the wing section and arrangement of the fs23. The students then concentrated on the fuselage of a new aircraft using the wing of the fs23 extended to 15m span, with drag reduced to a minimum by reducing the wetted area of the fuselage, as a whole, and reducing the sectional area dramatically aft of the wing. The long thin tail boom, constructed with aluminium alloy, was donated by VFW (Vereinigte Flugtechnische Werke) at Speyer and attached to the tubular steel fuselage centre section structure.

Tests were carried out to define the best method of transferring loads between fibre-glass components and other materials. Rivetting had been used on the fs23 through reinforcement with birch plys, but the best results were obtained by re-inforcing with extra fibreglass plys and direct bonding without screws, bolts or rivets. The reduced cross-section front fuselage was constructed from fibreglass/balsa sandwich attached to the internal centre section tubular steel structure with a reclined seating position and plexiglass canopy hinging to the rear.

After the first flight, on 30 January 1968, Helmut Reichmann (world standard and 15m class champion) flew the fs25 in the German national gliding championship, where he demonstrated the harmony of the controls, agility and the excellent climb performance due to the high aspect ratio and low wing loading.

Development of the fs25 has been carried out in France at the ENSMA – Ecole Nationale Supérieure de Mécanique et D'Aérotechnique as part of the Société Scientifique de Recherche et de Promotion du Planeur Léger. The ENSMA FS-25 F Cuervo has modifications to the internal structure as well as a retractable mainwheel, improved canopy and modified ailerons. A two-seat version has also been developed at ENSMA, as the ENSMA Two-seater.

== Specifications ==
Data from https://akaflieg-stuttgart.de/en/projects/fs25-cuervo/

General characteristics

- Crew: 1
- Length: 6.48 m (21 ft 3 in)
- Wingspan: 15 m (49 ft 2.5 in)
- Height: 0.80 m (2 ft 7.5 in)
- Wing area: 8.54 m^{2} (91.9 sq ft)
- Aspect ratio: 26.4:1
- Airfoil:
  FX 66-S-196 at 0,04 b/2
  FX 61-184 at 0,17 b/2
  FX 61-168 at 0,33 b/2
  FX 61-147 at 0,81 b/2
  FX 60-126 at 0,90 b/2
- Empty weight: 157 kg (346.1 lb)
- Gross weight: 250 kg (551.16 lb)

Performance

- Maximum glide ratio: 38.5
- Rate of sink: 0.60 m/s (118.1 ft/min)

== See also ==
Related lists

- List of gliders
