= Aerbul HB-4 =

General information
- Type: World class competition glider
- National origin: Argentina
- Manufacturer: Aerbul S.R.L
- Designer: Horacio Bulacio Campos
- Number built: 2

History
- First flight: 5 January 1993

The Aerbul HB-4 was a 1990s, Argentine contender in the IGC's World Class competition sailplane contest. It did not win and only two were built before a fatal accident terminated the programme.

== Design and development ==
The Aerbul HB-4 was designed and built over a three-year period begun in 1989 and was intended to take part in a competition organized by the IGC in 1988 to select a moderate cost competition sailplane. The chosen design would be the only one used in all World Class contests.

It was built from fibreglass and had a 15 m (49 ft 3 in) span wing. Apart from a T-tail, it closely resembled the earlier Aerbul HB-1 Club, though details of the HB-4 are sparse. Its shoulder wing had a rectangular plan out to about 60% span and outer, trapezoidal panels with a slightly different section and trailing edges filled by the ailerons. The inner sections carried Schempp-Hirth spoilers at mid-chord.

Its smoothly rounded fuselage was deepest ahead of the wings. The single seat cockpit had a long, single-piece canopy which continued the upper forward fuselage profile back almost to the wing leading edge. The fuselage tapered aft to a rather angular tail, where a large, tapered fin had a markedly trapezoidal profile. In contrast, the rudder was almost rectangular and quite narrow, as were the horizontal surfaces. Its tailplane was mounted on top of the fin.

The HB-4 landed on a retractable monowheel, mounted ahead of the wings and fitted with a brake, and a small tailwheel.

== Operational history ==
The first example was completed in 1992 and began testing on January 5, 1993. After the standard tests were completed the HB-4 was flown by local pilots. They appreciated its performance and several Argentine Clubs became interested, though by the spring of 1993 the IGC had declared the shorter span PW-5 Smyk winner of the World Class contest. The second example flew for the first time on 23 September 1994. However, the first prototype crashed fatally on 27 November 1994, leading to the loss of the type's airworthiness certificate.

== Specifications ==
Data from Planeurs

General characteristics

- Crew: one
- Wingspan: 15 m (49 ft 3 in)
- Airfoil: Wortmann FX 61-163 inboard, FX 60-126 outboard

Performance

- Maximum speed: 237 km/h (147 mph, 128 kn) in calm air
