= CAT TM.2 =

Prototype Italian transport glider

TM.2
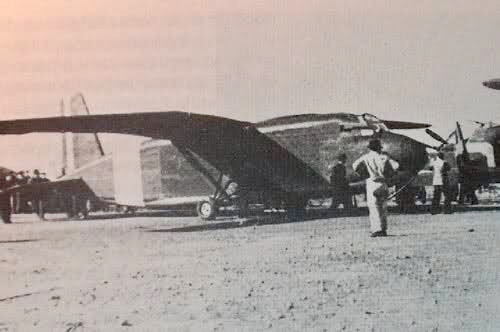

General information
- Type: Transport glider
- National origin: Italy
- Manufacturer: Construzioni Aeronautiche Taliedo
- Number built: 2

History
- First flight: 23 February 1943

The CAT TM.2 (Note: Sometimes known as the Caproni TM.2.) was a prototype Italian transport glider designed by Construzioni Aeronautiche Taliedo during the Second World War. Two prototypes were built, but no production followed.

== Development and design ==
In October 1941, as a result of the German invasion of Crete in May that year, the Italian Ministry of Aviation issued a specification for a medium-sized military glider, capable of carrying a load of 1,000–1,300 kg (2,200–2,900 lb). Proposals were received from Aeronautica Lombarda (the AL-12P), Avia (the SCA.2) and Costruzioni Aeronautiche Taliedo (CAT) (the TM.2 (Trasporto Militare). Costruzioni Aeronautiche Taliedo had been founded in 1937 by Ettore Catteano, a pioneer Italian glider pilot to license-build Dittmar Condor gliders at its factory at Milan-Taliedo airport. In 1940, the company had been sold to the industrialist Cesare Gallieni, who expanded it, taking on maintenance work for the Italian Air Force, and was looking to take on construction of its own designs.

The TM.2 was designed by Sergio Del Proposto, who was an employee of the adjacent Caproni aircraft factory. (Note: Despite this, CAT was not part of the Caproni group at the time.) The TM.2 was a high-wing monoplane of mixed wood and metal construction. The aircraft's fuselage featured an enclosed cockpit for a single pilot, with a plexiglas canopy that could be jettisoned to allow the pilot to escape by parachute. The main cabin had a length of 5.6 m (18 ft 4 in), a width of 1.2 m (3 ft 11 in) and a height of 1.65 m (5 ft 5 in) and was fitted with four large doors, with one each side of the fuselage forward and aft of the wing that could be quickly opened from a central control to allow quick disembarkation after landing. Ten armed troops could be carried, with alternative payloads of a Cannone da 47/32 infantry/anti-tank gun or an 81 mm mortar, with the associated crews and ammunition. The fabric-covered wings were braced with single struts, while the aircraft was fitted with a conventional landing gear, where the mainwheels could be partially raised, or jettisoned in flight with the aircraft then landing on a central skid.

The first prototype, serial number MM.510, was completed in January 1943, and taken to Milan Linate Airport for testing, with Nello Raimundo, who had previously tested the AVIA LM.02 bomber glider, allocated as test pilot. On 22 February 1943, while being towed along the runway by a Fiat CR.42 fighter aircraft, it took off on a short hop, rising to an altitude of 3 m (9.8 ft). On 23 March, the first full flight took place. On the next day, (Note: Nĕmeček states that this fatal second flight took place later on 23 March.) the TM.2 took off, again under tow by the CR.42, on its second test flight, but the glider broke away from its towline and crashed, killing Raimundo and the flight observer aboard the TM.2. This accident caused work on the second prototype, which had been completed, to be suspended while the cause of the crash was investigated. CAT, which had been purchased by Caproni, continued work on the larger TM.3 glider, of similar layout to the German Gotha Go 242, but this was never completed.

The second prototype survived the Second World War, and was placed on display at the Museo Nazionale Scienza e Tecnologia Leonardo da Vinci in Milan, where it remained in 2000.

== Specifications ==
Data from Dimensione Cielo

General characteristics

- Crew: 1
- Capacity: 10 troops
- Length: 13.07 m (42 ft 11 in)
- Wingspan: 22.80 m (74 ft 10 in)
- Height: 3,030 m (9,940 ft 11 in)
- Wing area: 46.00 m^{2} (495.1 sq ft)
- Empty weight: 1,700 kg (3,748 lb)
- Max takeoff weight: 3,700 kg (8,157 lb)

Performance

- Maximum speed: 170 km/h (110 mph, 92 kn) (under tow)
