= Akaflieg München Mü26 =

German single-seat glider, 1971

Mü26
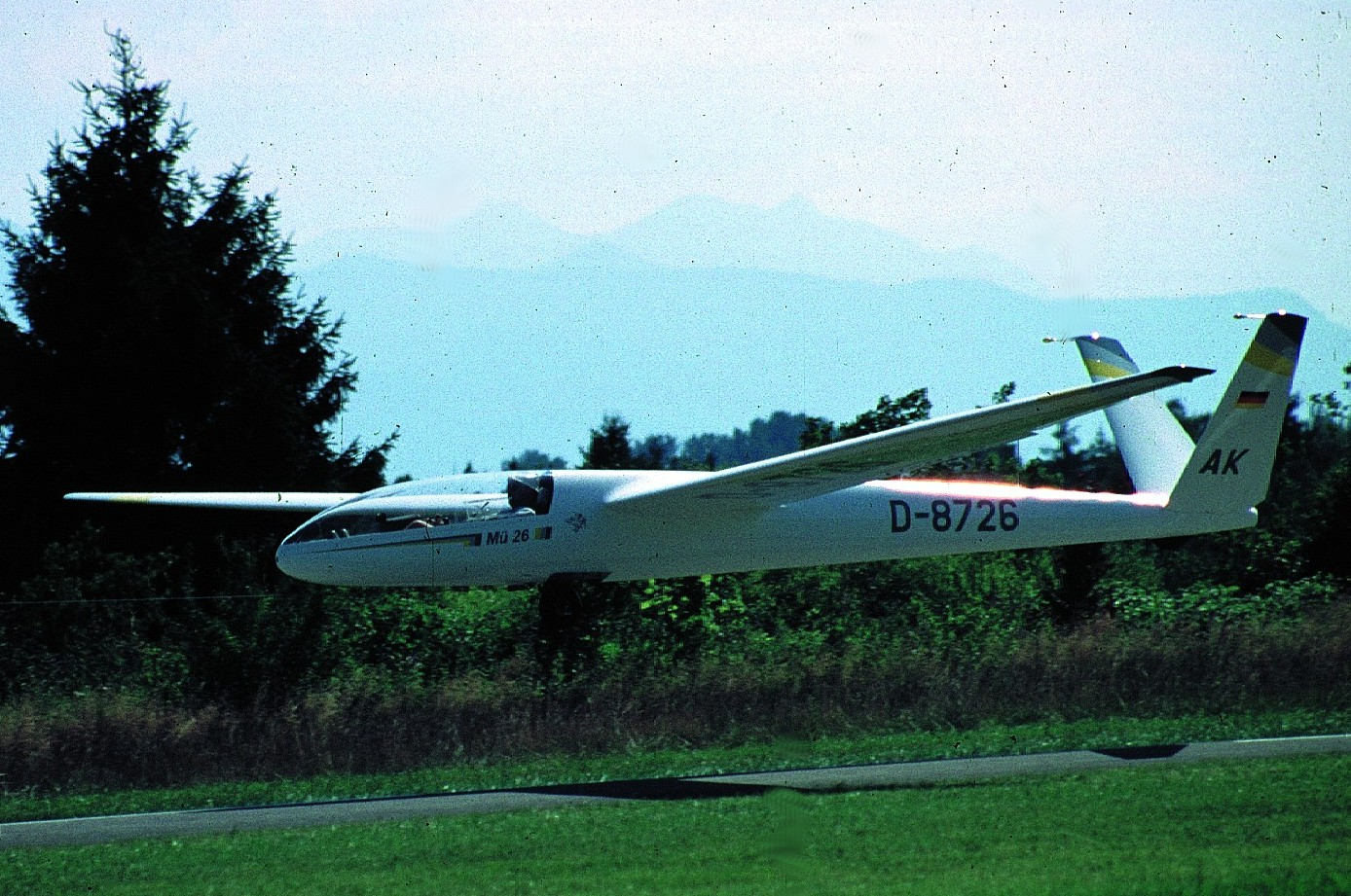
- The Mü26 on aero-tow

General information
- Type: High performance Glider
- National origin: Germany
- Manufacturer: Akaflieg München
- Number built: 1

History
- First flight: July 1971

The Akaflieg München Mü26 is a high performance single-seat glider designed and built in Germany starting in 1970.

== Development ==
After the success of the Akaflieg München Mü22, the students at Akaflieg München designed the Mü22d variant with a fibreglass fuselage, retaining the all-flying vee-tail and forward swept wooden wings of the earlier aircraft. Before the aircraft was completed it was given the new designation of Mü26. As with the Mü22 the closely spaced ribs and relatively thick plywood skin give the wings a high quality surface seldom found in other wooden aircraft. The supine seating position also reduced the cross-section of the cockpit to a minimum, reducing drag but resulting in cramped conditions in the cockpit.

First flight came in July 1971 at Oberpfaffenhofen, with the Mü 26 carrying out flight tests and cross-country flying until a crash in 1984 forced the airframe to be stored in the roof of the gliding club hangar. Veteran Akaflieger Rainer, Till and Skonz acquired the aircraft in 1987 and have restored it beautifully, after many years of painstaking work

To prove the competitiveness of the design, it was entered in the 2006 Austrian Federal Junior Gliding Championship, coming in fourth behind the Rolladen Schneider LS-3, fitted with the Akaflieg München automatic flap system, flown by Benz.

== Specifications (Mü26) ==
Data from Mü26

General characteristics

- Crew: 1
- Wingspan: 16.6 m (54 ft 6 in)
- Wing area: 15.3 m^{2} (165 sq ft)
- Aspect ratio: 18
- Airfoil: Eppler 348
- Empty weight: 212 kg (467 lb)
- Gross weight: 382 kg (842 lb)

Performance

- Maximum glide ratio: 40 at 97km/h (60mph)
- Rate of sink: 0.60 m/s (118 ft/min) at 83km/h (52mph)

== See also ==
Related lists

- List of gliders
