= Bertoni-Altinger BA-1 Superalbatros =

AB-1 Superalbatros

General information
- Type: Sailplane
- National origin: Argentina
- Manufacturer: Club Argentino de Planeadores Albatros – (Albatros, Argentine gliding club)
- Designer: Jorge Bertoni & Teodoro Altinger
- Number built: 1

History
- First flight: 6 May 1969

The Bertoni Altinger AB-1 Superalbatros (aka Alinger-Bertoni AB-1 Superalbatros) is a high-performance sailplane designed and built in Argentina in the 1950s and 1960s.

== Design and development ==
The AB-1 Superalbatros was conceived in 1954 by a group of designers at the Club Argentino de Planeadores Albatros – (Albatros, Argentine gliding club), transforming over the next 15 years to result in the high performance glider that entered flight test in 1969.

=== First iteration ===
The initial design, by Jorge Bertoni and his team, was for a glider with wooden wings and welded steel tube fuselage, construction of which started in late 1955.

=== Second iteration ===
In 1956 Teodoro Altinger joined the team after his return from Germany, suggesting that the aircraft be re-designed to take advantage of research and construction techniques developed at Akaflieg Darmstadt. The new laminar-flow wing sections developed by Franz Wortmann and the shaped foam / plywood construction method, (a la Akaflieg Darmstadt D-34), promised great improvements in performance, due to reduced drag and more accurate profiles. Altinger soon returned to Germany to continue his studies and construction soon floundered.

=== Third iteration ===
Bertoni was joined in April 1957 by Ricardo Olmedo, but progress was still slow until 1960, when the success of Argentinian pilot Rolf Hossinger at the 1960 World Gliding Championship at Köln, (Cologne), in Germany, inspired Bertoni to redesign the fuselage with a much finer fineness ratio fuselage to reduce drag as much as possible. The new fuselage was to be built from a balsa wood / glass-fibre sandwich to obtain a smooth finish with relatively easy construction.

== Description ==
The final version of the AB-1 was a 15 m (49 ft) flapped sailplane with wings built from plywood shaped around accurately cut balsa wood ribs and foam cores, with a fuselage constructed of balsa wood / glass-fibre sandwich skins over built-up wooden frames and steel high strength parts. The high fineness ratio (diameter or area over length) fuselage formed into an integral fin at the extreme end of the fuselage which supported the rudder and T-tail with split elevators. At the nose of the fuselage, forward of the wings, the pilot sat in a sharply reclined seat in the cockpit under a full-length canopy. The 6° forward swept wings sit on the shoulders of the centre fuselage which also has the single mainwheel. Just aft of the wings, on either side, are a pair of large area paddle airbrakes hinged at the leading-edge, intended for approach control. After poor results and an accident caused by the fuselage airbrakes, the full span flaps / ailerons were modified to deflect to 90° for approach control.

== Operational history ==
Flight testing of the AB-1 commenced on 6 May 1969 revealed a good performance with good handling characteristics, but poor results from the fuselage mounted air-brakes, which caused an accident during a landing. The AB-1 was flown with qualified success in several Argentine national Gliding Competitions in the 1970s, being modified several times to improve performance, but the AB-1 was soon out-classed in performance and was eventually retired to the San Andres de Giles gliding club.

== Specifications (AB-1 Superalbatros) ==
Data from El "Superalbatros" – Recuerdos y nostalgias

General characteristics

- Crew: 1
- Capacity: 100 kg (220 lb)
- Length: 6.4 m (21 ft 0 in)
- Wingspan: 15 m (49 ft 3 in)
- Wing area: 12.50 m^{2} (134.5 sq ft)
- Aspect ratio: 18
- Airfoil: Wortmann FX-057-816
- Empty weight: 200 kg (441 lb)
- Max takeoff weight: 300 kg (661 lb)

Performance

- Never exceed speed: 200 km/h (120 mph, 110 kn) in still air
- Maximum glide ratio: 35 at 90 km/h (49 kn; 56 mph)
- Rate of sink: 0.60 m/s (118 ft/min) at 70 km/h (38 kn; 43 mph)
- Wing loading: 24 kg/m^{2} (4.9 lb/sq ft)

== See also ==
Aircraft of comparable role, configuration, and era

- FFA Diamant

Related lists

- List of gliders
