= Graz VL-1 Maulwurf I =

VL1-Maulwurf

General information
- Type: Single-seat Hang Glider
- National origin: Austria
- Manufacturer: Akaflieg Graz
- Status: Prototype
- Number built: 1

History
- First flight: 18 February 1923

The construction of the "Maulwurf I" was carried out under adverse conditions and the lack of resources. It was only completed once Major General Ing Pedretti generously provided some rooms for final assembly in the artillery laboratory.

The first preliminary test flights were completed on 18 February 1923 at the military firing range Feliferhof. Under the expert guidance of Major Erich Kahler, the former commander of the airfield Thalerhof, the apparatus was prepared for first flight.

== Specifications ==
Data from Akaflieg Graz VL1 Maulwurf

General characteristics

- Crew: one
- Capacity: one pilot
- Length: 4.3 m (14 ft 1 in)
- Wingspan: 7 m (23 ft 0 in)
- Wing area: 10 m^{2} (110 sq ft)
- Empty weight: 25 kg (55 lb)
