= Aeronautica Lombarda AL-12P =

AL-12P
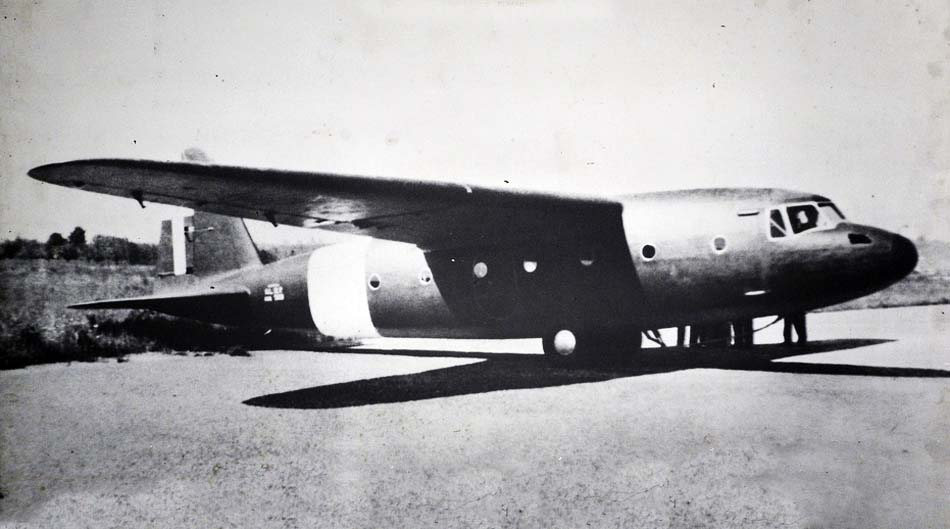

General information
- Type: Transport glider
- National origin: Italy
- Manufacturer: Aeronautica Lombarda
- Designer: A. Ambrosini
- Primary user: Italian Army
- Number built: 16

History
- First flight: 1943

The Aeronautica Lombarda AL-12P (also known as the Ambrosini AL-12P) was a Second World War Italian transport glider built by the Aeronautica Lombarda for the Italian Army.

== Design and development ==
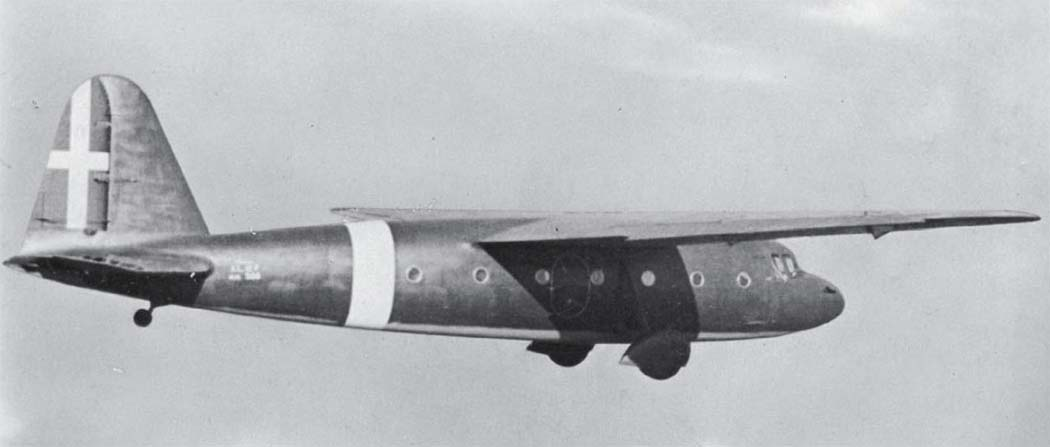
The Aeronautica Lombarda AL-12P in flight

The AL-12P was designed by A. Ambrosini and was a high-wing cantilever monoplane with a wood-ribbed fuselage covered with stressed molded plywood. Its wing had a foliated spruce plywood spar and was covered with plywood although the ailerons were fabric covered. It also had large slotted spoilers that could be opened perpendicular above and below the wing. The pilot and co-pilot sat side by side in the nose which is made from plywood-covered welded steel tubes and was hinged to allow cargo to be loaded into the fuselage, a passenger door was fitted on the right hand side of the fuselage. It could carry 12 fully equipped troops or the equivalent weight in equipment. The company built 16 AL-12Ps for the Italian Army.

== Ambrosini P.512 ==
A 3-view drawing of the P.512 illustrating the engine installation and revised undercarriage

After World War II, S.A.I.-Ambrosini modified at least one AL-12P to be powered by 2 × 167.78 kW (225 hp) Alfa Romeo 115ter six-cylinder air-cooled engines and fitted with a revised undercarriage with shock absorber struts attached to the engine nacelles braced by V-struts from the fuselage sides.

== Specifications (AL-12P / P.512) ==
Data from Mrazek

General characteristics

- Crew: 2 (pilot, co-pilot)
- Capacity: 12 fully equipped troops, (P.512) 1,600 kg (3,527 lb)
- Length: 14.02 m (46 ft 0 in)
- Wingspan: 21.34 m (70 ft 0 in)
- Height: 3.4 m (11 ft)
- Wing area: 50.7 m^{2} (546 sq ft)
- Empty weight: 1,588 kg (3,500 lb) , (P.512) 2,000 kg (4,410 lb)
- Gross weight: 2,812 kg (6,200 lb) , (P.512) 3,600 kg (7,937 lb)
- Powerplant: 2 × Alfa Romeo 115ter 6-cyl. inverted in-line air-cooled piston engines, 168 kW (225 hp) each (P.512)
- Propellers: 2-bladed metal variable-pitch propellers

Performance

- Maximum speed: 249 km/h (155 mph, 135 kn) (P.512)
- Cruise speed: 230 km/h (143 mph, 124 kn) (P.512)
- Minimum control speed: 85 km/h (53 mph, 46 kn) (P.512) with flaps, (P.512) without flaps 97 km/h; 52 kn (60 mph)
- Range: 500 km (310 mi, 270 nmi) (P.512) with a payload of 1,275 kg (2,810 lb), (P.512) 499 km; 269 nmi (310 mi) with a payload of 748 kg (1,650 lb)

1,240 miles.

- Service ceiling: 2,100 m (6,900 ft) (P.512) on one engine
- Rate of climb: 4.9 m/s (970 ft/min) (P.512)
- Wing loading: 71 kg/m^{2} (14.5 lb/sq ft) (P.512)
- Power/mass: 0.09 kW/kg (0.057 hp/lb) (P.512)

== See also ==
- Military gliders
