= Akaflieg München Mü13 =

German single-seat glider, 1935

Mü13
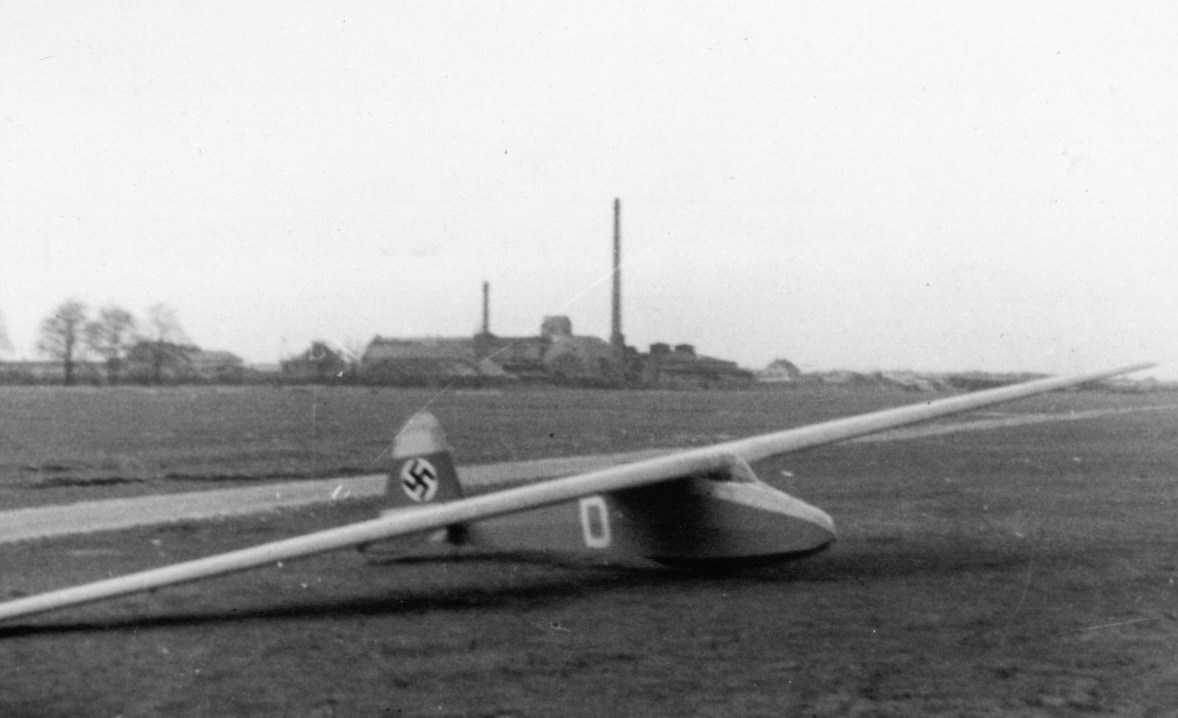

General information
- Type: Sailplane
- National origin: Germany
- Manufacturer: Akaflieg München
- Designer: Egon Scheibe, Kurt schmidt and Tony Troeger
- Number built: ca 150

History
- First flight: 1935
- Variant: Scheibe Bergfalke

The Akaflieg München Mü13 Merlin and Akaflieg München Mü13 Atalante were gliders designed and built in Germany from 1935. A motor-glider version of the Merlin was converted by the addition of a small engine in the nose, as the Mü13M Motormerlin. Post-war development as the Mü13E entered production as the Scheibe Bergfalke.

== Development ==
Germany had established Akademische Fliegerschule at several universities after World War I. The first and lead group was established in Berlin, but one of the most prolific, up to World War II, was Akaflieg München.

The Akaflieg München Mü13 was a single-seat development of the two-seat Akaflieg München Mü10 Milan, designed and built by Tony Troeger and Kurt Schmidt, under the direction of Egon Scheibe, in two versions, a motorglider and a pure sailplane. Two prototypes were built: Tony Troeger's motor glider was named 'Merlin' and Kurt Schmidt's sailplane was named 'Atalante'. One is on display at Gliding Heritage Centre, another at German Gliding Museum.

The Mü13s were constructed with welded steel tube fuselages faired and covered using wooden longerons with fabric and conventional wooden wings with plywood skinning back to the main spar and fabric aft. In the prototypes the trailing edge of the wings were taken up by steel-framed fabric covered flaps and ailerons, all deflectable to improve thermalling and approach control, but later production aircraft had the flaps eliminated, upper surface spoilers fitted for approach control, with the Mü13D-3 gaining increased span wings, a lengthened fuselage and an enlarged fin and rudder. This arrangement from Egon Scheibe became known as the Schüle München - Munich School. The pilot sat just forward of the main-spar with his head flanked by the wing leading-edges, severely restricting sideways vision.

The performance of the Mü13 was regarded as particularly good at an L/D ratio of 28 and the ability to fly at relatively high speeds due to the slender Mü Scheibe aerofoil section. 'Merlin', flown by Hans Wiesehöfer, flew around southern Germany and the Alps on point to point flights, but 'Atalante' achieved fame as the mount of Kurt Schmidt, who at the age of 16 had been responsible for building a large part of 'Atalante as well as piloting the glider at the 1935 Rhön competition at the Wasserkuppe, achieving the longest flight at 252 km (156.6miles) from the Wasserkuppe to Trier. The success of Kurt Schmidt brought attention to the Mü13 and demand for a production version. Among other accolades 'Atalante', piloted by Kurt Schmidt, also set a German goal flight (fly to a specified goal) record of 482 km (260 nm) in May 1939.

With improvements the Mü13 went into production as the Mü13D, built by the Schwarzwald-Flugzeugbau Wilhelm Jehle (Wilhelm Jehle Black Forest Aircraft Works) in Donaueschingen, with Mü13D's taking part in most gliding competitions from 1936 to the start of World War II.

The tandem two seat Mü13E, produced post-war as the Scheibe Bergfalke series of Trainers, was, in essence a new design.

Tony Troeger's 'Merlin' had an 18 hp (13 kW) Kroeber M4 Köller two cylinder horizontally opposed engine fitted in the nose, re-designated Mü13M Motormerlin, reaching a top speed of 125 km/h (78 mph) and landed at 45 km/h (28 mph) making wheel brakes on the retractable mainwheel superfluous. Taking part in the 1937 Rangsdorf competition the Mü13M Motormerlin scored highly demonstrating the best performance.

== Variants ==
- Mü13 'Merlin' — First prototype of the Mü-13 built in 1935.
- Mü13 'Atalante' — Second prototype of the Mü-13 built in 1936.
- Mü13D — Production aircraft built by the Black Forest Aircraft works.
- Mü13D-3 — One of the last variants of the Mü-13 introduced in 1943.
- Mü13E — Post-war development flown in 1951 and produced as the Scheibe Bergfalke.
- Mü13M Motormerlin — 'Merlin' D-14-127 fitted with a 18 PS (17.8 hp; 13.2 kW) Kroeber M4 Köller 2-cylinder 2-stroke engine and retractable main undercarriage.
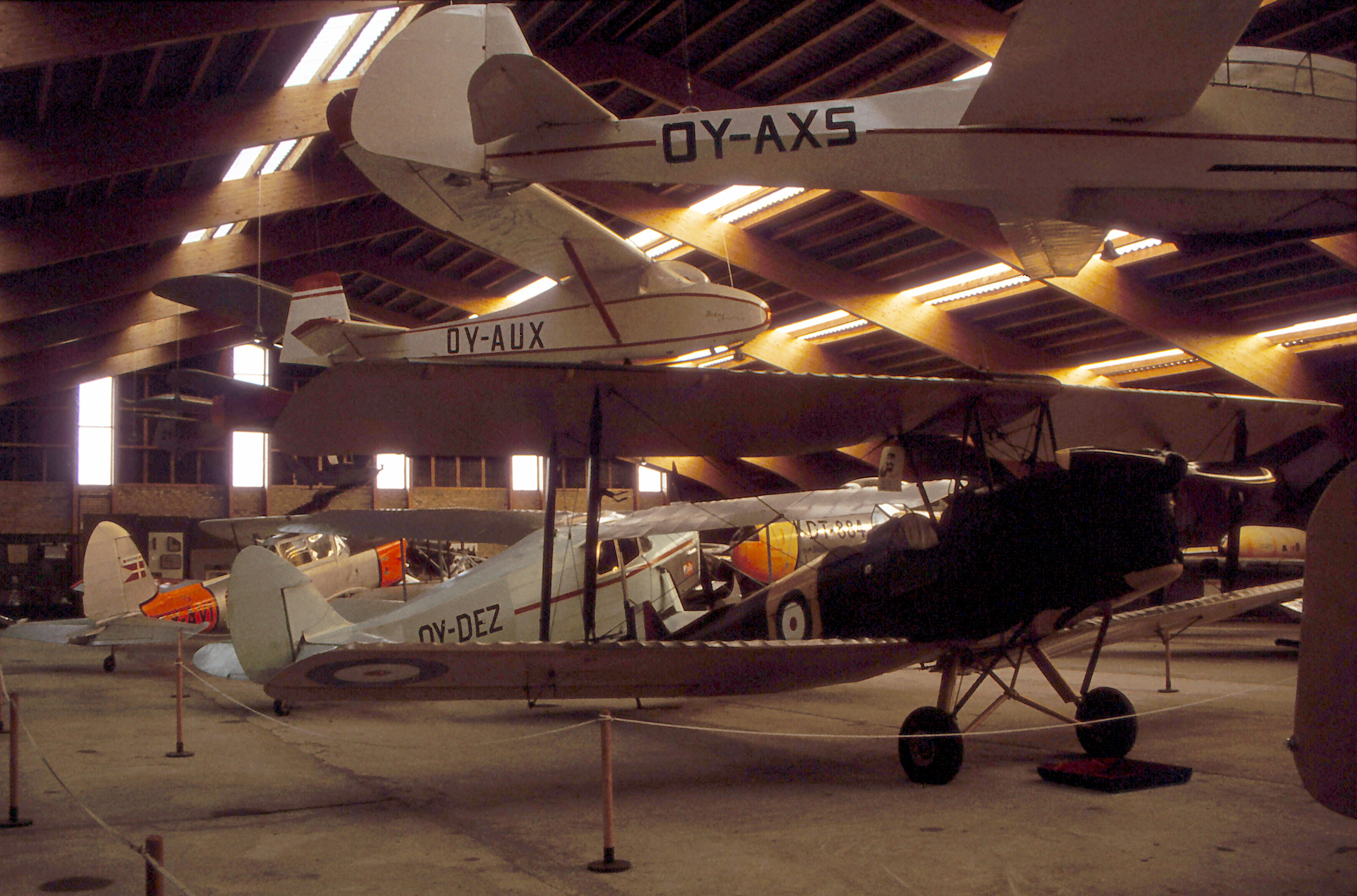

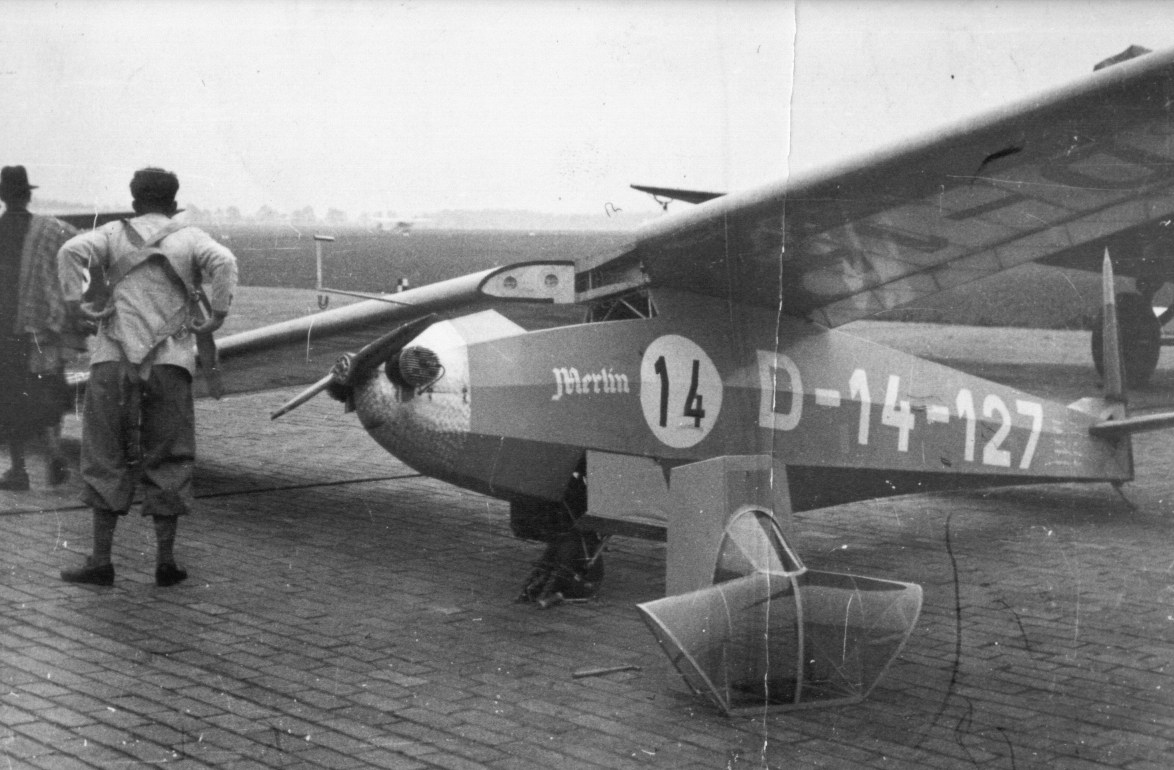

== Specifications (Mü13 Merlin) ==
Data from Jane's World Sailplanes & Motor Gliders, Flugzeug-Typenbuch. Handbuch der deutschen Luftfahrt- und Zubehör-Industrie 1944.

General characteristics

- Crew: 1
- Length: 5.9 m (19 ft 4 in)
- Wingspan: 16 m (52 ft 6 in)
- Height: 1.65 m (5 ft 5 in)
- Wing area: 17 m^{2} (180 sq ft)
- Length de-rigged: 8.5 m (28 ft)
- Width de-rigged (without tailplane): 1.04 m (3 ft 5 in)
- Width de-rigged (with tailplane): 2.52 m (8 ft 3 in)
- Height de-rigged: 1.52 m (5 ft 0 in)
- Aspect ratio: 15.05
- Airfoil: Scheibe Mü 15%
- Empty weight: 145 kg (320 lb)
- Gross weight: 285 kg (628 lb)

Performance

- Never exceed speed: 200 km/h (120 mph, 110 kn)
- g limits: +12 (ultimate)
- Maximum glide ratio: 28:1 at 70 km/h (43 mph; 38 kn)
- Rate of sink: 0.58 m/s (114 ft/min) at 55 km/h (34 mph; 30 kn)
- Wing loading: 13.82 kg/m^{2} (2.83 lb/sq ft)

== See also ==
Aircraft of comparable role, configuration, and era

- Schneider Grunau Baby

Related lists

- List of gliders
