= AB Flygindustri Fi-1 =

Swedish intermediate training glider

Flygindustri Fi-1
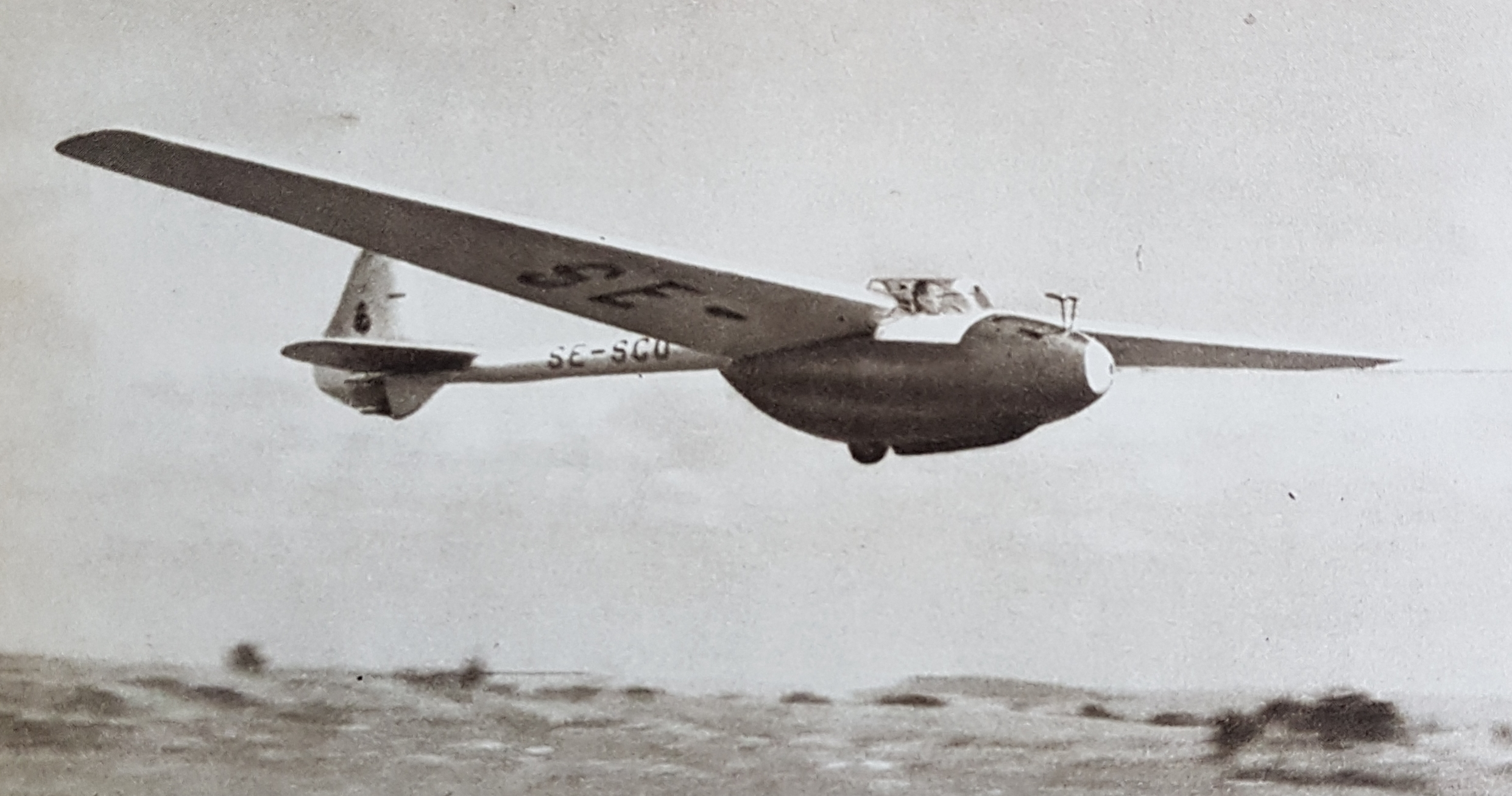

General information
- Type: Single-seat intermediate training glider
- National origin: Sweden
- Manufacturer: AB Flygindustri, Halmstad
- Designer: Tord Lindman and Rudolf Abelin
- Number built: 7

History
- First flight: 1942

The AB Flygindustri Fi-1 was a Swedish intermediate training glider built in small numbers in the 1940s.

== Design and development ==
What became AB Flygindustri was initially a canoe building factory founded by Rudolf Abelin, who had earlier worked in de Havilland's aircraft factory in England. His canoes had hulls formed with moulded veneers and he saw that these techniques could be used to produce glider fuselages. AB Flygindustri became the first Swedish glider company and began by building German aircraft under licence.

The Fi-1 was originally intended to be an improved Grunau Baby but developed into a much more capable design. Its shoulder mounted wing was largely based on that of the DFS Olympia though reduced in span by 1.00 m (3 ft 3 in) to 14.00 m (45 ft 11 in) by clipping the Olympia's tips to produce a tetragonal, equal-tapered plan. It is built around a single spar and an inboard, internal, diagonal drag strut rearwards to the fuselage on each side. The leading edge is plywood-covered back to the spar and struts. Apart from some ply reinforcement around the Schempp-Hirth type spoiler mounted on the rear of the spar at around mid-span, the rest of the wing surface is fabric-covered. Its ailerons, also fabric-covered, fill less than half the trailing edge.

The glider has a pod-and-boom fuselage, constructed with techniques learned in canoe building. Both pod shell and boom, made separately, were shaped by glueing crisscrossed layers of veneer strips round a former and held down within a vacuum bag. The resulting shell was then stabilised by oven-baking for up to a day. The nose cone, made from glue-soaked rayon fabric, was also preformed. The pod shell was then attached to a steel tube skeleton which contains the cockpit under a multi-part canopy, placing the pilot above the wing leading edge. The rear of the cockpit is smoothly faired into the boom. Below, the pod carries the monowheel landing gear, placed under the forward wing, with a landing skid ahead of it. Behind the wheel the pod curves upwards on its underside to meet the slender boom just aft of the wing rather abruptly.

The tail surfaces are fabric-covered apart from ply-reinforced leading edges of the tailplane and very narrow fin and the bottom of the rudder. The latter has a blunted triangular profile. In plan, the tailplane and elevators, mounted on top of the boom, are straight-tapered to rounded tips with a small cut-out for rudder movement. On its underside the boom has a ply-covered tail bumper.

The Fi-1 first flew in 1942. Flight tests revealed a problem with the original canopy, which produced turbulence over the tail, but this was rapidly fixed.

== Operational history ==
The Fi-1 had been intended as a Grunau Baby replacement but emerged as too advanced for first-solo pilots and only seven were built. One went to Denmark; modified by students of the Polyteknisk Flyvergruppe in Copenhagen, it was flown by K.A. Rasmussen in the 1950 World Championships, held at Örebro. He finished in 18th place out of 29, a remarkable result for a trainer. The same aircraft was used to make the first Danish Gold C flight.

Another Fi-1 was exported to Iceland in 1945 and registered as TF-SDR.

== Aircraft on display ==
- TF-SDR is on display in the Ållebergs Segelflygsmuseum, Falköping.

== Specifications ==
Data from j2mcl planeurs

General characteristics

- Crew: One
- Length: 6.44 m (21 ft 2 in)
- Wingspan: 14.00 m (45 ft 11 in)
- Wing area: 14.45 m^{2} (155.5 sq ft)
- Aspect ratio: 13.6
- Airfoil: Göttingen Gö 549 root, Gö 676 tip
- Empty weight: 165 kg (364 lb)
- Gross weight: 260 kg (573 lb)
- Dihedral: 2.5°

Performance

- Maximum speed: 200 km/h (120 mph, 110 kn)
- Maximum glide ratio: 23
