= Aero Industries TG-31 =

TG-31

General information
- Type: Training glider
- National origin: United States
- Manufacturer: Aero Industries Technical Institute
- Primary user: United States Army Air Force
- Number built: 1

The Aero Industries TG-31 was a 1940s American military training glider, designed and built by students at the Aero Industries Technical Institute as the Aero Industries G-2 and impressed into military service as the Aero Industries TG-31 on 29 June 1942.

== Design and development ==
The Aero Industries TG-31 design was a high-wing sailplane design of wood-steel-fabric construction, with a single wheel aft of the nose skid. One G-2 sailplane (civil registration NC19965) was impressed into USAAF service on June 29, 1942 and allocated the designation TG-31 and the serial number 42-57171.

== Operators ==
United States

- United States Army Air Forces

== Specifications ==
Data from

General characteristics

- Crew: 1
- Length: 20 ft (6.1 m)
- Wingspan: 48 ft (15 m)
- Height: 5 ft (1.5 m)
- Wing area: 230 sq ft (21 m^{2})
- Max takeoff weight: 450 lb (204 kg)

Performancedive or glide speed

== See also ==
Related lists

- List of gliders

== Bibliography ==
- Andrade, John (1979). U.S.Military Aircraft Designations and Serials since 1909. Midland Counties Publications. ISBN 0-904597-22-9.
