= Abbott Farnham sailplane =

British single-seat glider, 1930

General information
- Type: Competition sailplane
- National origin: UK
- Manufacturer: E. D. Abbott Ltd
- Designer: T.C. Letcher
- Number built: 1

History
- First flight: August 1930

The Abbott Farnham sailplane was a one-off competition sailplane designed and built in the United Kingdom in 1930.

== Design and development ==
The Abbott Farnham sailplane, named after its builders, was designed by T. C. Letcher and first flew in August 1930. It was an all-wood single-seat glider with a cantilever three piece high wing. The central half span had constant chord; outboard long elliptical tips contained the ailerons. No airbrakes or flaps were fitted. The fuselage was roughly elliptical in cross-section, tapering towards the tail where it carried mid-mounted, straight-tapered elevators with rounded tips. The rudder was hinged at the extreme end of the fuselage and was of rounded triangular shape with a steep rising leading edge. The open cockpit was immediately ahead of the wing leading edge. Its undercarriage was a single long skid, reaching from the nose to well behind the wing trailing edge, with a small tailskid.

== Operational history ==
The Abbott Farnham was jointly owned by L. H. Ellis and Russell Taylor. It was entered for the German National Competition of 1930, held at the Wasserkuppe, but failed to turn up. Only one was built, flying with the name "Alert" on the nose.

== Specifications ==
Data from British Gliders and Sailplanes

General characteristics

- Capacity: 1
- Length: 20 ft 3 in (6.17 m)
- Wingspan: 60 ft (18 m)
- Wing area: 224 sq ft (20.8 m^{2})
- Aspect ratio: 16
- Empty weight: 328 lb (149 kg)

Performance

- Lift-to-drag: 22
