= Akaflieg Darmstadt D-34 =

German single-seat glider, 1955

D-34

General information
- Type: Experimental single seat sailplane
- National origin: Germany
- Manufacturer: Akaflieg Darmstadt
- Designer: D-34a: W. Sarnes and H. J. Merklein
- Number built: 2 or 3

History
- First flight: 1955

The Akaflieg Darmstadt D-34 sailplanes were a series of experimental single seat sailplanes, designed at the University of Darmstadt in the 1950s and early 1960s to explore the structural and aerodynamic advantages of the then emerging plastics and composite materials.

== Design and development ==
The Akademische Fliegergruppe of the Technical University of Darmstadt (Akaflieg Darmstadt) was first formed in 1921. It was, and is, a group of aeronautical students who design and construct aircraft as part of their studies and with the help and encouragement of their University. The 1955 D-34 was their first post-World War II design and formed the basis for a series of experimental sailplanes which explored new materials, airfoils and construction methods.

The D-34 was a small single seat sailplane, all variants having a wingspan of only 12.65 m (41.5 ft). The first three variants shared a common, single piece, wing of straight tapered plan with a root to tip chord ratio of 2.03 and an area of 8.0 m^{2} (86 sq ft). There were small, cigar shaped tip fairings, termed salmons. The profile was the thick (21% thickness-to-chord ratio) NACA 64_{4}621, intended to produce laminar flow over the front 40% of the wing. It was formed around a three box spar of pine and plywood, its cells filled with plastic foam. The spar was less deep than the wing and the surface profile was shaped in ply over a small number of full chord ribs plus a carefully shaped plastic foam block filling.

The wing was attached to the top of the fuselage, with cockpit immediately ahead under a removable, smooth, single piece canopy which was faired into the leading edge and extended almost to the nose. To avoid wing surface irregularities the D-34 had airbrakes mounted on the lower fuselage under the wing leading edge, opening like rear hinged car doors. A deep, faired skid served as undercarriage; there was no tail skid. The plywood skinned, oval section fuselage tapered uniformly to the rear. The D-34 had a T-tail with a straight tapered, round tipped, tabbed horizontal surface. The original fin was upright and of narrow chord, carrying a rudder much wider than the tailplane, with a straight, raked trailing edge.

The D-34a first flew in 1955. Flight testing showed that the novel wing construction worked well, but that both the ailerons and vertical rear surfaces needed more area. This was addressed by extending the trailing edges of the ailerons beyond those of the wings and extending the rudder rearwards, giving it a more rounded appearance. At the same time a rudder tab was fitted, the fin chord increased and a dorsal fillet added. Various cockpit modifications were also made, including a new, longer version which reached forward over an extended forward fuselage to the small metal nose cone. The fuselage mounted airbrakes were not a success.

In 1957 another group of students produced the modified D-34b Aphrodite, with G. Jacoby chiefly responsible for the redesign. It is not certain if this was a new airframe or a rebuild of the D-34a, but it used the same wing design apart from the inclusion of flaps, capable of 60° deflections and longer, lower chord ailerons which extended over the rest of the trailing edge outboard of the flaps. The flaps replaced the unsatisfactory airbrakes of the D-34a but the enlarged ailerons did not produce effective lateral control. The D-34b kept the longer forward fuselage of the modified D-34a, though with a less extended canopy, but had the original D-34 fin and rudder. The upper fuselage behind the cockpit was raised and more strongly faired over the wing, smoothing the upper fuselage line over the trailing edge. It had a retractable monowheel undercarriage and small tailskid in place of the bulky main skid of the D-34a. These changes raised the empty weight from the 128 kg (282 lb) of the D-34a to 141 kg (311 lb). By the time the performance was tested in 1960 the D-34b was showing signs of age but still returned a best glide ratio of 28.3:1, very respectable for a 12.65 m (41.5 ft) span glider.

The D-34c B'phrodite was designed by M. Rade and flew in 1958. The main change was to the fuselage, with the original stressed-ply covered, wood-framed structure replaced by a fabric covered steel frame. The monowheel was non-retractable and the wingtip salmons removed. The empty weight was decreased by 4 kg (8.8 lb).

The last variant was the D-34 of 1960. Designed, amongst others, by Gerhard Waibel, it kept the D-34b fuselage and tail but married it to a wing of new construction methods, different profile and larger area whilst keeping the same span as the earlier models. To achieve the latter both root and tip chords were increased by about 12%. The wings had 1° of dihedral and 2° of forward sweep. The salmons were replaced by rounded tips and the ailerons were longer and wider than those of the D-34b; just inboard of them inboard spoilers replaced the flaps. Structurally the wing was very different; there was no main spar. The front 60%, from a light, balsa filled nose to a plywood auxiliary spar, was a glass reinforced plastic (GRP) shell with a stiffening paper honeycomb filling. Ailerons and airbrakes were attached to the auxiliary spar. Behind it, the wing had ribs covered with a GRP/plastic foam sandwich. Careful construction kept the local "waviness" to less than 20 μm (0.00079 in).

Though it had a lower aspect ratio (17.5) than the D-34b (20) because of the increased wing area, the D-34d had an improved best glide ratio of 35.1:1. Like the earlier variants, it was not intended as a production or competition aircraft, but as vehicle for the development of students' experience with the new materials of the time.

== Aircraft on display ==
The D-34c D-4644 may be viewed with prior permission in the German Gliding Museum on the Wasserkuppe. A section of the D-34d wing is also there.

== Variants ==
D-34a
1955, original version.
D-34b Aphrodite
1957, revised fuselage, retractable wheeled undercarriage.
D-34c B'phrodite
1958, steel framed, fabric covered fuselage, fixed wheel undercarriage.
D-34d
1960, new, GRP wing of greater area, D-34 b fuselage.

== Specifications (D-34d) ==
Data from Sailplanes 1945–1965

General characteristics

- Crew: 1
- Length: 6.40 m (21 ft 0 in)
- Wingspan: 12.65 m (41 ft 6 in)
- Wing area: 9.2 m^{2} (99 sq ft)
- Aspect ratio: 17.5
- Airfoil: NACA 64_{3}618
- Empty weight: 160 kg (353 lb)
- Gross weight: 255 kg (562 lb)

Performance

- Stall speed: 65 km/h (40 mph, 35 kn)
- Maximum glide ratio: 31.6:1 at 90 km/h (56 mph; 49 kn)
- Rate of sink: 0.7 m/s (140 ft/min) minimum
- Wing loading: 29.4 kg/m^{2} (6.0 lb/sq ft)
