= Akaflieg München Mü22 =

German single-seat glider, 1954

Mü22
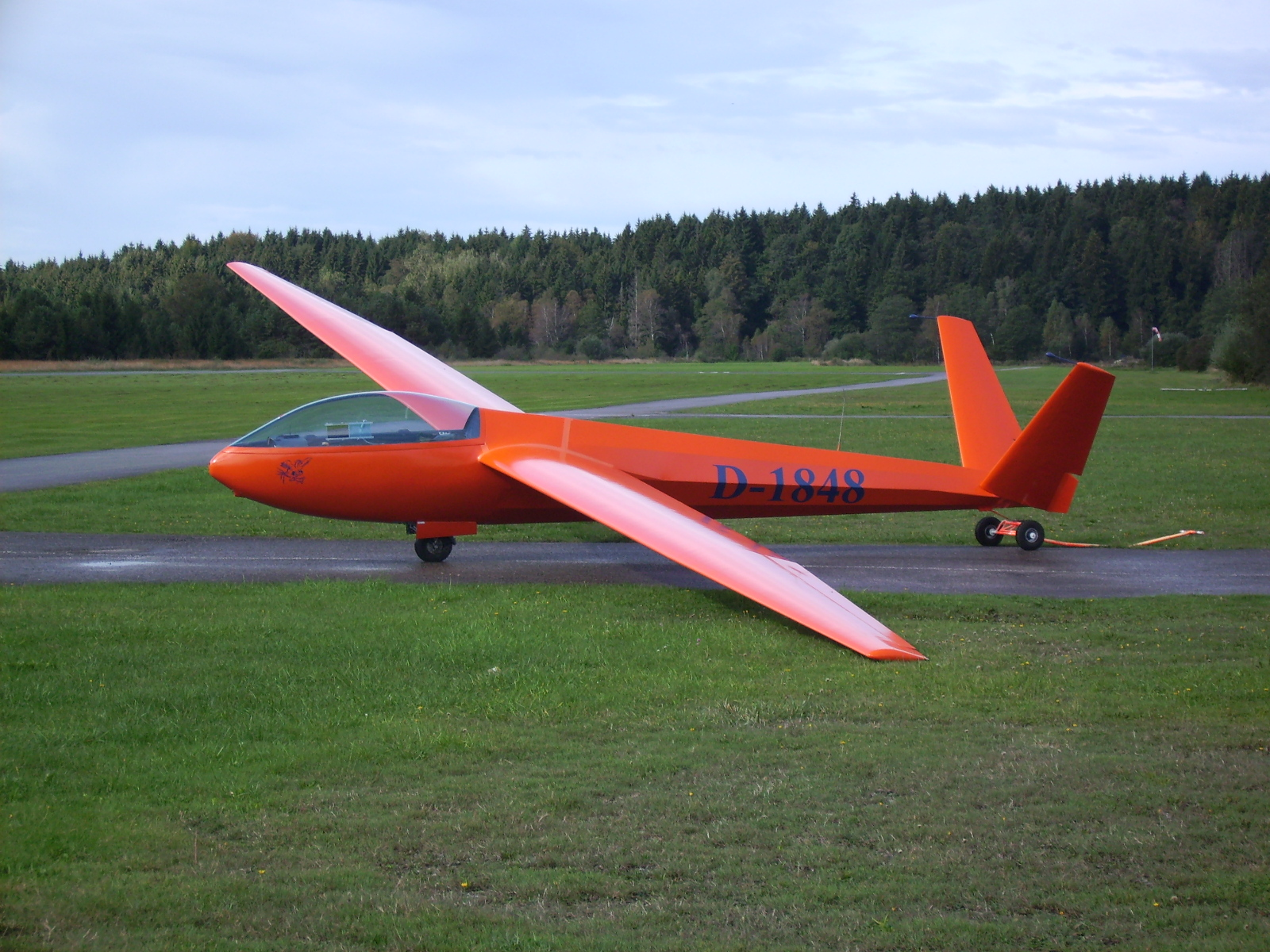
- The Mü22b

General information
- Type: High Performance Glider
- National origin: Germany
- Manufacturer: Akaflieg München
- Designer: Dipl. Ing. J Kraus
- Number built: Mü22 – 1, Mü22b - 1

History
- First flight: Mü22 – 1954, Mü22b – 13 March 1964

The Akaflieg München Mü22 is a single-seat research glider designed and built in Germany from 1953.

== Development ==
=== Mü22(a) ===
The first aircraft built by Akaflieg München after World War II was the Mü22, with typical 'Munich School' construction of steel tube fuselage with wooden wings and tail-unit. Design of this high-performance glider with 30% laminar flow forward swept wings and vee tail started in 1953 with construction complete in late 1954 at the Akaflieg München workshops at Prien.

Use of the laminar flow NACA 63 (3)-618 aerofoil section imbued the Mü22 with a good glide ratio at a high speed which was ideal for competition cross-country flight, in contrast to the low speed Mü Scheibe section used for previous sailplanes at Akaflieg München. To maintain strength with reduced weight and to eliminate turbulence from gaps and protuberances the Mü22 was built without airbrakes, relying on the use of the 70 degree trailing edge split flaps and the skill of the pilot in side-slipping for approach control. The high performance of the design was demonstrated during flight testing after the first flight on 29 November 1954 at Riem, as well as by placing second in the German National Gliding Championships in 1959. The Mü22 was also flown extensively to investigate mountain flying during which the Mü22 suffered a serious accident late in 1959 and was damaged beyond repair.

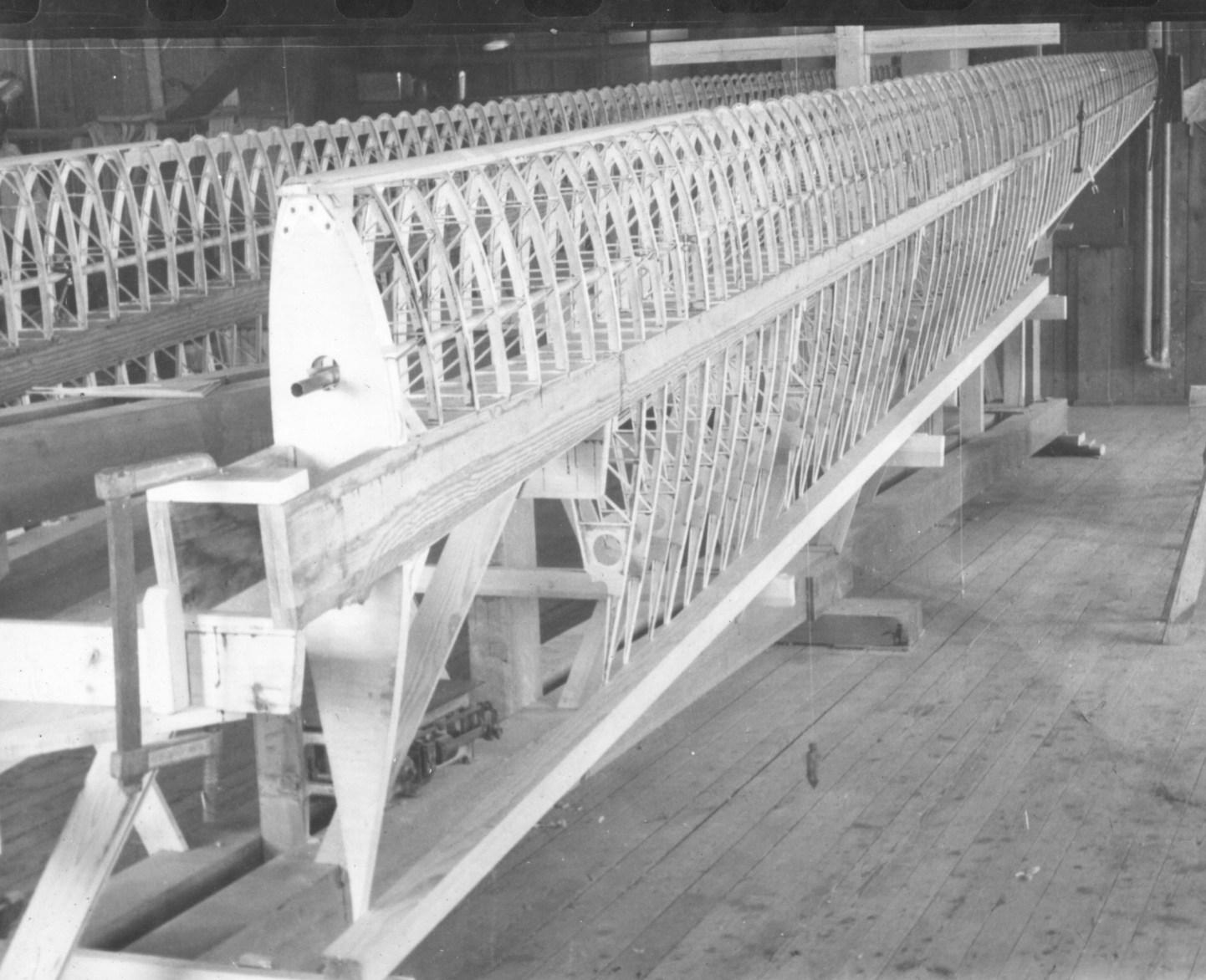
The Mü22 wings under construction illustrating the closely spaced ribs

Note: Originally the Mü22 was not given the 'a' suffix. This suffix was applied after the Mü22b was built to differentiate between the two aircraft.

=== Mü22b ===
The second Mü22, given the suffix 'b', followed the design principles of the original crashed version but introduced an all-flying vee-tail and a smoother fibreglass covered forward fuselage to reduce drag. Construction of the laminar flow wings, using plywood skin over closely spaced ribs, gives an accurate profile which has remained true since manufacture. Flight testing commenced in 1964 but was marred, on 5 June 1964, by the failure of a bolt attaching a bearing in the tail unit, the tail fluttered dramatically breaking the tail unit off the fuselage. The pilot, Dipl.-Ing. Frodo Hadwich, bailed out safely and the glider impacted relatively softly enabling repairs to be carried out.

The relatively high performance of the Mü22b makes the aircraft popular for cross-country tasks but the landing characteristics, without airbrakes, require practice for smooth landings. The Mü22b continued to fly at the Akaflieg München gliding club, until at least 2002, and has also competed in recent competitions, flown by Heiko Hertrich in 1986, completing a 586 km triangle for the Barron Hilton Cup, as well as completing a 650 km triangle flown by Jan Skedelj.

== Variants ==
- Akaflieg München Mü22(a) – The original aircraft with fixed vee-tail and fabric covered steel tube fuselage.
- Akaflieg München Mü22b – The second aircraft, built to replace the crashed Mü22 with fibreglass covered fuselage and all-flying vee-tail.

== Specifications (Mü22b) ==
Data from Mü22b

General characteristics

- Crew: 1
- Wingspan: 17 m (55 ft 9 in)
- Wing area: 13.7 m^{2} (147.5 sq ft)
- Aspect ratio: 21.1
- Airfoil: NACA 63 (3)-618
- Empty weight: 280 kg (617 lb)
- Gross weight: 360 kg (794 lb)

Performance

- Maximum glide ratio: 36 at 80 km/h (50mph)
- Rate of sink: 0.56 m/s (110 ft/min) at 69 km/h (43mph)

Aircraft of comparable role, configuration, and era

- SZD-22 Mucha Standard
- Standard Austria
- Schemp-Hirth SHK
