= AB Flygindustri =

AB Flygindustri was a Swedish aircraft manufacturer during the interwar period from 1924 to 1935. The company was founded by Carl and Adrian Florman and based in Malmö, Sweden AB Flygindustri was an offshoot of AB Aerotransport both of which were formed by the Florman brothers with support from Junkers to avoid restrictions on German aircraft.
