= Addyman Zephyr =

One-off, British single seat sailplane, 1933

Zephyr

General information
- Type: Single-seat sailplane
- National origin: United Kingdom
- Manufacturer: E. T. W. Addyman at Harrogate
- Designer: E. T. W. Addyman
- Number built: 1

History
- First flight: 1933

The Addyman Zephyr was a one-off, single-seat sailplane designed and built by Erik Addyman in the UK for his own use in the 1930s.

== Design ==
Erik Addyman designed and built the single-seat Zephyr, his first design, in 1933. It was intended as a light wind sailplane, combining a wing of modest aspect ratio with a nacelle cockpit and an open truss girder fuselage of the kind more common on primary gliders. It was a wooden-structured, largely fabric-covered aircraft.

The two-spar wing had a straight leading edge and constant chord out to a little over half span, where the trailing edges of the ailerons, hinged at a slight angle to the spar, curved inwards to the wingtips. It was braced from above with pairs of wires from the spars to a central, inverted V-strut pylon and below by wires to the lower nacelle longerons. There were no flaps or air brakes. The central wing rib was continued rearward with the upper member of the open, flat, converging Warren girder fuselage, whose lower member joined the keel of the plywood- and fabric-covered nacelle just aft of the wing trailing edge. This placed the open single cockpit just forward of the wing leading edge. A central keel skid formed the main undercarriage, with assistance from a tail bumper. A narrow-span, triangular tailplane, wire braced above and below, carried longer-span elevators with rounded tips and a cut-out for the deep, rounded rudder hinged to small, triangular fin.

The Zephyr flew for the first time in 1933.

== Operational history ==
Only one Zephyr was built. Based at Harrogate, where Addyman was honorary secretary of the Aircraft Club, it was often launched with a tow from a horse. He flew it from many fields in central and north-western England up to the early part of World War II; from 1940 there was a government ban on recreational glider flying. The Zephyr seems not to have flown again, though substantial parts of it still (2010) exist in store.

== Specifications ==
Data from Ellison

General characteristics

- Crew: 1
- Length: 18 ft 6 in (5.64 m)
- Wingspan: 41 ft 9 in (12.73 m)
- Wing area: 195.0 sq ft (18.12 m^{2})
- Aspect ratio: 9.5
- Empty weight: 185 lb (84 kg)
