= Akaflieg Stuttgart fs23 =

German single-seat glider, 1966

General information
- Type: Glider aircraft
- National origin: West Germany
- Manufacturer: Akaflieg Stuttgart
- Designer: R. Eppler & H. Nägele
- Number built: 1

History
- First flight: 1 February 1966

The Akaflieg Stuttgart fs23, nicknamed Hidalgo (Spanish: "Nobleman"), was a glider aircraft that was designed and built in West Germany from 1953. It was lighter than most contemporaries. Only one example of the design was constructed, which was destroyed in a fatal crash in 1971.

== Development ==
Design of the fs23 was started in 1953 and took thirteen years, including a hiatus while the fs24 Phönix was developed. The goal of the fs23 designers was a lightweight high-performance glider to meet the proposed 13m mini-standard class for competition gliders. To achieve this goal the students at Akaflieg Stuttgart thoroughly tested fibreglass re-inforced composites, as well as birch ply and balsa/fibreglass sandwiches, for E- and G-modulus, compressive and torsional strength as well as bonding and rivetting methods. Once the testing was complete the aircraft could be designed to ensure adequate strength with light weight, (1/3 to 2/3 the weight of typical gliders of the time), and good aerodynamic qualities, the result being the fs23 Hidalgo.

Built primarily of balsa core sandwiched in fibreglass, the fs23 was a high-wing, high aspect ratio, cantilever monoplane with moderate dihedral and -6^{o} sweep, (to reduce the tail moment required and thus the size and weight of the rear fuselage and tail unit), and a V-tail. A fixed undercarriage and a brake parachute were used. Flight trials began on 1 February 1966 demonstrating that the fs23 had sensitive controls, side-slipped well and gave adequate warning of a stall. It recovered easily from a spin, within half a turn. In 1967 the fs23 suffered severe tail flutter and the pilot was thrown out of the cockpit, descending by parachute, as the aircraft dived towards the ground from 1500 meters altitude. The aircraft landed with minimal damage and was repaired to continue the test programme until July 1971 when the fs23 crashed a second time, with the pilot, Heinz Jahn, losing his life.

== Specifications ==
Data from https://akaflieg-stuttgart.de/en/projects/fs23-hidalgo/

General characteristics

- Crew: 1
- Length: 5.0 m (16 ft 5 in)
- Wingspan: 13 m (42 ft 8 in)
- Height: 0.89 m (2 ft 11 in)
- Wing area: 7.0 m^{2} (75 sq ft)
- Aspect ratio: 24.1
- Airfoil: FX 61-184 bei (root) / FX 61-168 bei (23% semispan) / FX 61-147 bei (70%) / FX 60-126 bei (88%)
- Empty weight: 102.5 kg (226 lb)
- Gross weight: 190 kg (419 lb)

Performance

== See also ==
Aircraft of comparable role, configuration, and era

- Standard Austria

Related lists

- List of gliders
