= Aerbul HB-1 Club =

HB-1 Club

General information
- Type: Club class training sailplane
- National origin: Argentina
- Manufacturer: Aerbul S.R.L.
- Designer: Horacio Bulacio Campos and Néstor Fasola
- Number built: 2

History
- First flight: January 1989

The Aerobul HB-1 Club was a Club Class training sailplane built in Argentina in 1988.

== Design and development ==
In March 1982 the HB-1 was the winner of a design contest arranged by the National Airworthiness Directorate (D.S.A.) for a training glider. As winner, the HB-1 was given state financial support for its development and promised a subsidy for its production. However, the contract signed the following year with the D.S.A. limited funding to two prototypes and their development.

It was a Club Class sailplane built entirely from fibreglass. Its 15 m (49 ft 3 in) span shoulder wings had rectangular plan inboard panels, with central Schempp-Hirth spoilers. Beyond 40% of the span of the outer panels were trapezoidal, with slightly different sections and with ailerons filling their trailing edges. Each wing contained a water tank holding 30 L (1.1 cu ft) of ballast.

Its smoothly rounded fuselage was deepest ahead of the wings. The single seat cockpit had a long, single-piece canopy which continued the upper forward fuselage profile back almost to the wing leading edge. The fuselage tapered aft to a rather angular tail, where a tapered fin had a markedly trapezoidal profile and was large. In contrast, the rudder was almost rectangular and quite narrow, as were the horizontal surfaces. Its tailplane was mounted above the fuselage on the fin, about one third the way up.

The HB-1 landed on a retractable monowheel, fitted with a brake and mounted ahead of the wings, and a small tailwheel. The fuselage underside was strengthened to withstand a wheel-up landing.

== Operational history ==
The first prototype was first flown on 20 January 1989. A series of brief, familiarization flights followed before the start of the test programme proper on 24 February. Though most of these flights explored the handling and performance envelope, a less conventional test of the landing gear included a landing in a ploughed field.

The second prototype, which had a fixed landing wheel, was not completed until 24 January 1991. After its tests were satisfactorily completed, both examples served the Club de Planeadores y Aeromodelismo Esperanza at Santa-Fe, which encouraged their novice competition pilots to take the HB-1s to various national and international contests to build experience.

== Specifications ==
Data from j2mcl-planeurs, Aerbul HB-1 Club

General characteristics

- Crew: one
- Length: 6.87 m (22 ft 6 in)
- Wingspan: 15.0 m (49 ft 3 in)
- Wing area: 11.55 m^{2} (124.3 sq ft)
- Aspect ratio: 19.48
- Airfoil: Wortmann FX-61-163 inboard, FX-60-126 outboard
- Empty weight: 230 kg (507 lb)
- Gross weight: 404 kg (891 lb)

Performance

- Maximum speed: 237 km/h (147 mph, 128 kn) in calm air
- Minimum speed: 65 km/h (40 mph; 35 kn)
- Maximum glide ratio: 36.6 at 95 km/h (59 mph; 51 kn)
- Rate of sink: 0.55 m/s (108 ft/min) at 67 km/h (42 mph; 36 kn)
