= Addyman STG =

British single-seat glider, 1934

STG (Standard Training Glider)

General information
- Type: Primary training glider
- National origin: United Kingdom
- Manufacturer: E. T. W. Addyman at Harrogate
- Designer: E. T. W. Addyman
- Number built: 2

History
- First flight: June 1934

The Addyman STG was a single seat primary glider, amateur designed and built in the United Kingdom in the mid-1930s.

== Design ==
Erik T. W. Addyman designed and built his STG single seat primary glider for low cost basic training. As such, it was a simple, wooden, aerodynamically unrefined aircraft with a relatively low aspect ratio wing, a cockpit nacelle under it and a flat open truss girder fuselage aft. The unswept wing had parallel chord with blunt tips and was built around two spars. There were no flaps or airbrakes. Above the wing landing wires ran from about mid-span on each wing from the spars to the top of a centrally mounted inverted V-strut; below, similarly arranged flying wires ran to the lower nacelle longerons.

Attached immediately behind the single open cockpit headrest at the forward wing spar, the nacelle extended rearwards only to the wing trailing edge, suspended from an inverted V pair of struts to the rear spar. A landing skid extended over most of the length of the nacelle. Aft of the nacelle, the fuselage was an uncovered converging Warren girder structure carrying the tail surfaces and braced laterally by wires to the mid-span wing points. The fin was very small but carried an almost rectangular rudder which extended to the fuselage keel via a cut-out in the elevators. The tailplane was straight tapered, with a swept leading edge. A wire tail bumper completed the undercarriage.

The STG was built at Harrogate and flew for the first time in June 1934.

== Operational history ==
It seems that two STGs were built. One of them was originally based at Wigan, the other at Harrogate. Addyman was the Honorary Secretary of The Aircraft Club, Harrogate; a letter from him to Flight in July 1942 says that one STG was there, "overhauled", and another was three-quarters built, though the former was unable to fly because of a Government ban on glider use at that point of the War. The fate of the partially built STG is not known. There were plans to build another after World War II but construction probably did not start. The two completed aircraft survive in store in 2010.

Another STG was begun, intended for powered flight using an Anzani engine. Parts of this machine, which has become known as the Addyman UL (UltraLight), also survive in store.

== Specifications ==
Data from Ellison

General characteristics

- Crew: 1
- Length: 19 ft 4 in (5.90 m)
- Wingspan: 37 ft 6 in (11.43 m)
- Wing area: 187.0 sq ft (17.37 m^{2})
- Aspect ratio: 7.5
- Airfoil: Gŏttingen 436

== See also ==
Aircraft of comparable role, configuration, and era Other primary gliders from around 1930 were:

- B.A.C. II
- Cloudcraft Dickson Primary
- Stamer Lippisch SG-38 Zögling
