= Georges Abrial =

French aerodynamicist (born 1898)

- Born: 1898; Paris
- Died: 1970 (aged 71–72); Vauville, Manche
- Education: St Cyr Aeronautical Institute
- Engineering career
- Discipline: aerodynamics
- Employer: Pierre Levasseur (aircraft builder)

Georges Abrial (1898 in Paris – 1970 in Vauville, Manche) was an early French aerodynamicist.

== Life ==
After graduating from the St Cyr Aeronautical Institute he worked for Levasseur (Levasseur-Abrial A-1) and did some pioneering work into tailless aircraft. He designed several gliders during the 1920s before turning to lecturing the following decade, when he also became influential in the French soaring movement.

Abrial stopped designing new aircraft after 1932 when he abandoned his A-12 project. He was more attracted by instructorship and educational methods and played an important role in the development of soaring in France during the 1930s. After World War II, he was still active in promoting soaring in France and in French Africa.

In 1954 he came back to the design of tailless aircraft, with the A-13 "Buse" project. But this glider was never built.

== Aircraft designs ==
- Abrial A-2 Vautour (1925) Single-seat sailplane, 12.65 m wingspan
- Abrial A-3 Oricou (1927) Single-engine single-seat powered touring aircraft
- Abrial A-12 Bagoas (1931) Single-seat tailless sailplane of extremely low aspect ratio.
- Abrial A-13 Buse (1954) Proposed single-seat sailplane. Not completed
