= Abrial A-3 Oricou =

General information
- Type: Touring aircraft
- Manufacturer: Georges Abrial
- Designer: G. Abrial

The A-3 Oricou (French for African vulture) was a small French touring airplane designed in 1927 by Georges Abrial. It could seat two, and was powered by a 30 kW (40 hp) piston engine.

== Specifications (A-3 Oricou) ==
General characteristics

- Crew: 1
- Powerplant: 1 × unknown piston engine, 30 kW (40 hp)

== See also ==
- History of aviation
