= Abrial A-2 Vautour =

Single-seat French glider, 1925

General information
- Type: Single seat glider
- National origin: France
- Manufacturer: Louis Peyret
- Designer: Georges Abrial
- Number built: 1

History
- First flight: 1925

The A-2 Vautour (Vulture) was a single-seat French glider that was designed by Georges Abrial. It performed well at the Vauville competition of 1925.

== Design ==
The Vautour was designed by Georges Abrial of the Institut aérotechnique de Saint-Cyr and built by Louis Peyret. Each wing, joined to a centre-section on top of the fuselage with light dihedral, had a rectangular plan apart from an angled tip and carried a broad chord aileron which filled about 60% of the span. They were of mixed construction with two rectangular section dural spars and plywood ribs. Each wing was braced with a pair of parallel struts, dural tubes enclosed in streamlined, wooden fairings, between the lower fuselage longerons and the wing spars just inside the ailerons.

Its fuselage was rectangular in section, with spruce longerons and laminated wood frames. The sides were everywhere vertical but ahead of the wing it narrowed in plan and decreased in depth to a rounded nose. The downward sloping upper surface here was not flat but curved, formed from thin aluminium sheet. The pilot's open cockpit was just in front of the leading edge, with a rubber-cord restrained canvas sheet between him and the aluminium surface, intended as protection in a crash. It contained some basic instrumentation, including an airspeed indicator and an altimeter, both with sensors well above the wing centre-section on a mast, as well as a compass.

The horizontal tail of the Vautour, mounted at mid-fuselage height, was similar in plan to the wing. The tailplane was much narrower than the one piece elevator. The fin was likewise narrower than the rudder and together had a rhomboidal profile, allowing elevator clearance below. Both surfaces were wood-framed and ply covered, with the exception of the fabric covered rudder.

Its landing gear was very simple, with wheels close to the sides on a split axle mounted within the fuselage. Rubber cord shock absorbers were used and the tailskid was also mounted elastically.

== Operational history ==
The date of the first flight of the Vautour is not known but it made its first major public appearance in the meeting held at Vauville from 22 July to 11 August 1925. The competition included both gliders and low-powered aircraft. The Vautour, flown by Auger, gained the prize for greatest altitude above the starting point, reaching 720 m (2,360 ft). It was placed second in a competition to fly the maximum number of 1 km (0.62 mi) laps, managing 36. It remained at Vauville after the contest and in February 1926 Auger returned to it with the intention of an attack on the altitude and distance records, as well as competing in several contests. By April the attempt had been abandoned due to unsuitable winds and the glider was dismantled and returned to Paris, with the hope of later using a site in Eure. There is no record that these attempts were made.

== Specifications ==
Data from Les Ailes, August 1925

General characteristics

- Crew: 1
- Length: 6.25 m (20 ft 6 in)
- Wingspan: 12.65 m (41 ft 6 in)
- Wing area: 20 m^{2} (220 sq ft)
- Aspect ratio: 8
- Airfoil: Royer
- Empty weight: 106 kg (234 lb)
- Gross weight: 180 kg (397 lb)
