= Abrial A-12 Bagoas =

Single-seat French glider, 1932

A-12 Bagoas
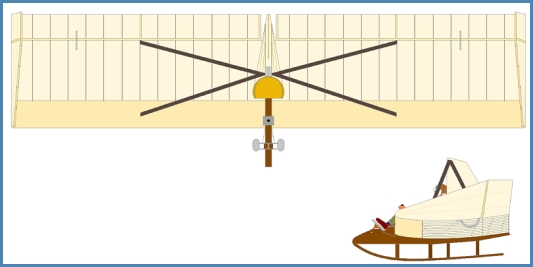

General information
- Type: Experimental glider
- National origin: France
- Manufacturer: Georges Abrial
- Designer: Georges Abrial
- Status: Abandoned project
- Number built: 1

History
- First flight: First week of July 1932.

The A-12 was an unusual tailless glider designed by Georges Abrial in the early 1930s. It was not a success and was abandoned in 1932.

== Design ==
The Abrial A-12 was unusual in having a very low aspect ratio wing, even by the standards of its time. Other tailless gliders of the 1920s, notably the Lippisch Storch series had aspect ratios of about 8, compared with the 4.75 of the Abrial. Further, where the Storchs had swept wings the Abrial's was rectangular in plan. After encouraging tests of models in the wind tunnel at St Cyr, Abrial built a full-sized version.

The Abrial's wings had the designer's own reflexed camber aerofoil. Such aerofoils are useful for tailless aircraft, because the pitching moment about the aerodynamic centre of the wing can be zero. The wings were mounted with strong dihedral and braced from above by a V-strut on each side, their apexes meeting at a faired triangular central support structure. It had control surfaces on the wings which may have operated as elevons and trapezoidal rudders mounted on triangular fins at the wing tips.

The pilot's unenclosed seat was immediately in front of the central support structure, at the centre of the wing, with his feet on a rudder bar ahead of the leading edge. The Abrial landed on a skid, with little wheels under the wing tips.

Abrial named the A-12 Bagoas, after the Persian Vizier and poisoner. Its first flights were made during the first week of July 1932. It presented so many technical problems that he abandoned development later that year.

== Specifications ==
Data from Les Ailes July 1932

General characteristics

- Crew: One
- Wingspan: 8.70 m (28 ft 7 in)
- Wing area: 16 m^{2} (170 sq ft)
- Aspect ratio: 4.75
- Airfoil: Abrial no.17
- Empty weight: 100 kg (220 lb)
