= Akaflieg München Mü10 Milan =

German two-seat glider, 1934

Mü10 Milan
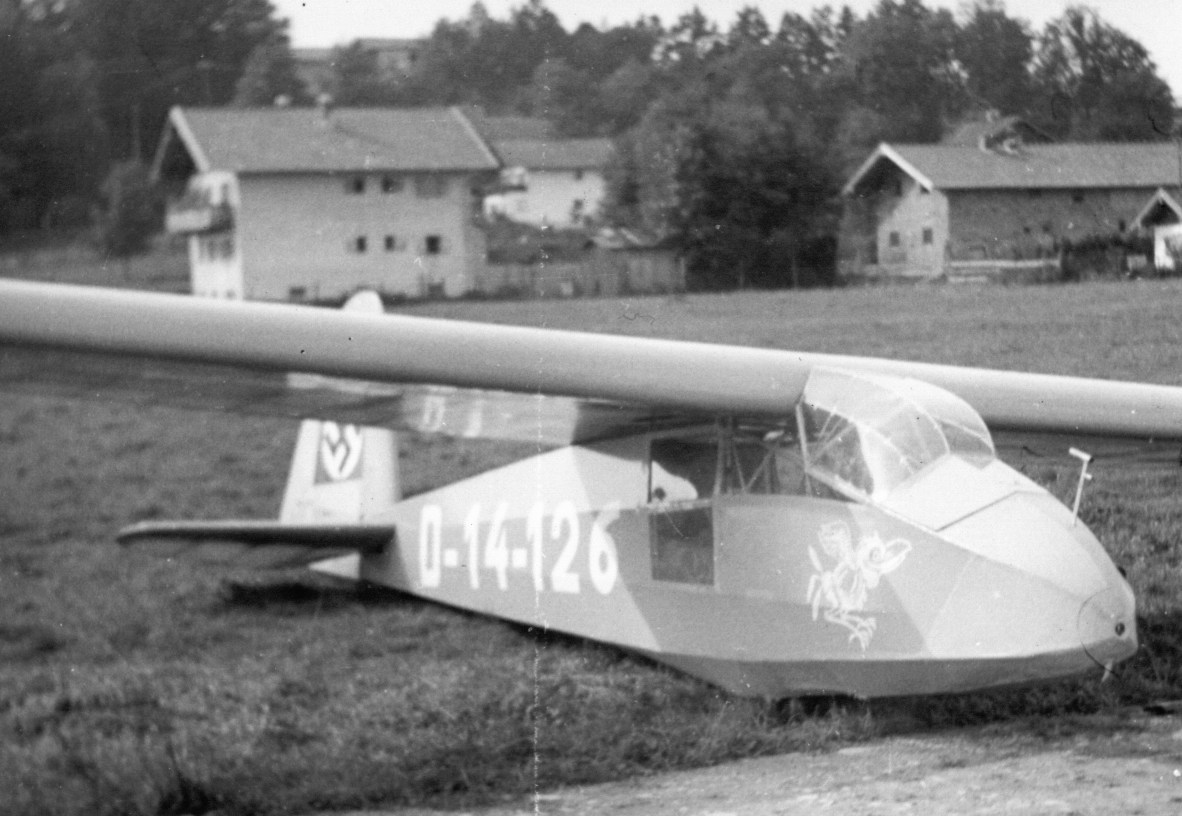

General information
- Type: Training Glider
- National origin: Germany
- Manufacturer: Akaflieg München
- Designer: Dipl.-Ing. Egon Scheibe
- Number built: 1

History
- First flight: 1934
- Retired: 1959

The Akaflieg München Mü10 Milan is a two-seat glider aircraft that was designed in Germany in 1934. Only one copy of the design was built.

== Development ==
The Mü10 Milan is one of the most successful gliders built by Akaflieg München in its early history. Construction of this two-seater, designed by Dipl.-Ing. Egon Scheibe, uses mixed materials with wooden wings and tail surfaces covered with fabric, as well as a welded steel tube fuselage covered with fabric, the first time welded steel tubing was used for a practical sailplane.

Performance of the Mü10 Milan was found to be good at low speeds, suiting the aircraft to thermalling, due to the use of homegrown aerofoil sections developed by Egon Scheibe, who was now leader of the Akaflieg München design team. The sections used were highly cambered in the leading edge with virtually no camber aft of mid chord, producing a section with reduced twisting and pitching moments and high lift coefficients.

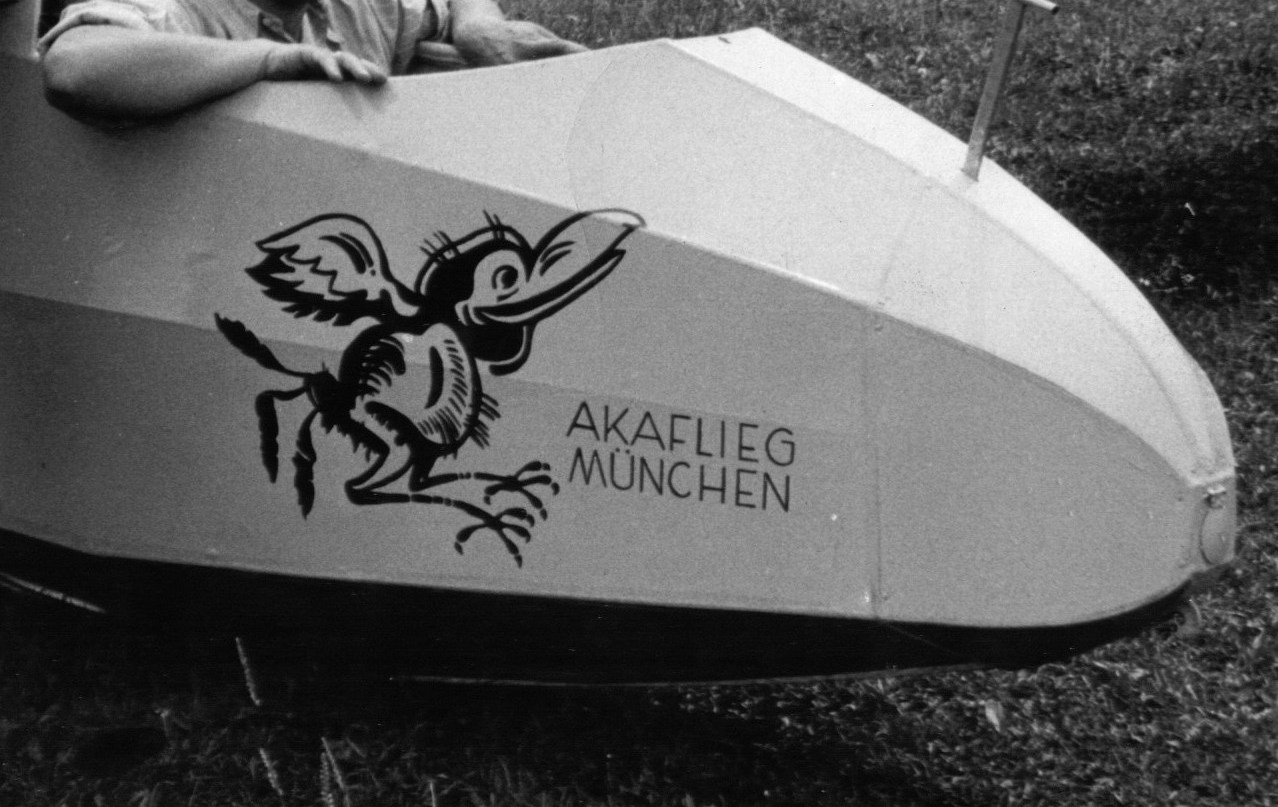
A close-up of the nose showing the Akaflieg München logo

Accommodation in the Mü10 Milan was in two cockpits, one forward of the wing leading edge for the student and another under the trailing edge of the centre-section aft of the mainspar. Entry into the front cockpit was via a removable canopy, (largely opaque with portholes in the first iteration), built up with wooden frames and Plexiglas panels. The rear cockpit was accessed via a large door on the port side of the fuselage with windows under the wings forward to the front cockpit glazing and in the centre-section above the instructor's head. The rear access door could also be used as an airbrake to assist in approach control.

Despite the low performance of the Mü10 Milan, with an L/D of 20, the aircraft was listed as high performance as late as 1938, perhaps due to the many cross-country flights the aircraft is credited with, such as Hesselberg-Prague (1934), a world record breaking 180 km flight in 1935, Salzburg-Fara d'Alpago / Italy (195 km, 1937) and Bern-Pallanza/Lago Maggiore (136 km; 1938) as a two-seater. Success in gliding competitions was also achieved with the 1934 Rhön-construction prize and 1st place at the ISTUS Conference (International Study Commission for gliding). At Salzburg it was flown by Ludwig Karch to a height gain of 2980m (9777 feet) and 195 km (121 miles) distance over the Austrian Alps.

The 'Milan' was retired to the Deutsches Museum München, at Oberschleissheim, before World War II, surviving the war to be resurrected by Akaflieg München in 1951 to assist with training new students, as well as carry out long-distance cross-country flights and mountain flying, until at least 1959 with the Mü10 finally being retired to the Deutsches Museum München for a second time.

== Variants ==
Akaflieg München Mü10 Milan – two-place glider; steel-tube fuselage, Mü Scheibe wing section and wooden wings. One unit constructed.

Akaflieg München Mü24 Milan II - A proposed instrument flying-version

In the early 1960s students at the Akaflieg designed a cloud/instrument flying version of the Mü10. The Akaflieg München Mü24 Milan II was to have had similar layout and profiles to the Mü10, with the slow-flying qualities of the Mü Scheibe aerofoil sections and improved aerodynamics for the fuselage and wings. The Mü24 did not progress beyond the drawing board.

== Specifications (Mü10 Milan) ==
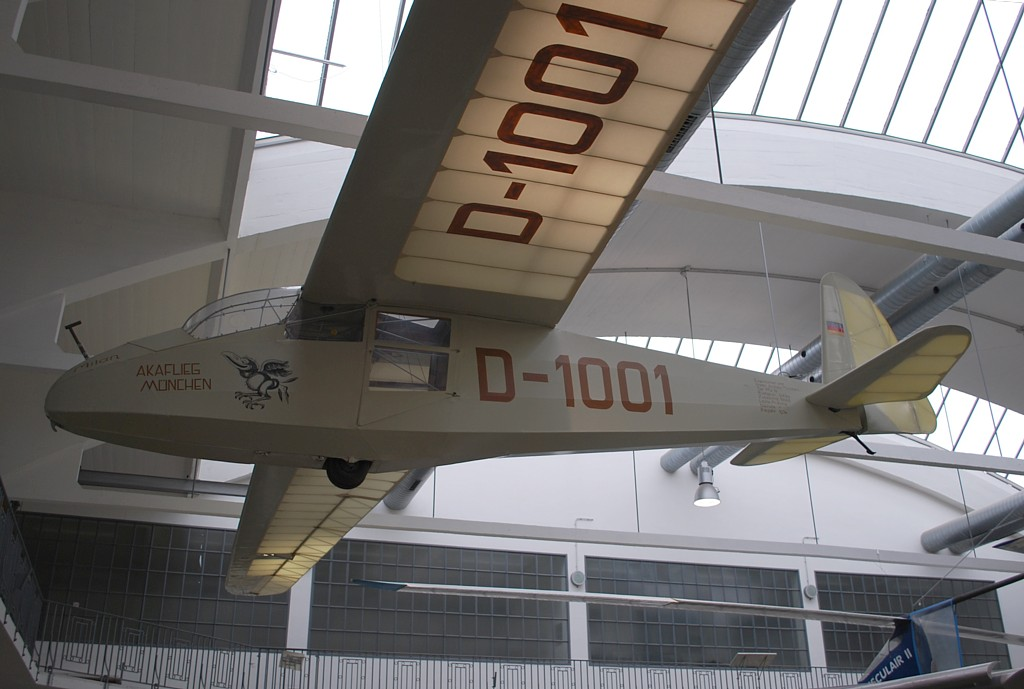
München Mü10 Milan on display at Deutsches Museum Flugwerft Schleissheim

Data from Flugzeug-Typenbuch. Handbuch der deutschen Luftfahrt- und Zubehör-Industrie 1944

General characteristics

- Crew: 1 pilot
- Capacity: 1 passenger
- Length: 6.75 m (22 ft 2 in)
- Wingspan: 17.8 m (58 ft 5 in)
- Height: 1.5 m (4 ft 11 in)
- Wing area: 20 m^{2} (220 sq ft)
- Aspect ratio: 15.85
- Airfoil: Scheibe Mü
- Empty weight: 185 kg (408 lb)
- Gross weight: 365 kg (805 lb)

Performance

- Never exceed speed: 180 km/h (110 mph, 97 kn)
- Maximum glide ratio: 22 at 70 km/h (43 mph; 38 kn)
- Rate of sink: 0.65 m/s (128 ft/min) at 50 km/h (31 mph; 27 kn)
- Wing loading: 18.25 kg/m^{2} (3.74 lb/sq ft)

== See also ==
- List of gliders
