= List of gliders (L) =

This is a list of gliders/sailplanes of the world, (this reference lists all gliders with references, where available) Note: Any aircraft can glide for a short time, but gliders are designed to glide for longer.

== L ==
=== La Mouette ===
(Hang gliders - Fontaine-lès-Dijon, France)

- La Mouette Atlas
- La Mouette Chronos
- La Mouette Cosmos
- La Mouette O2B
- La Mouette Profil
- La Mouette Revo
- La Mouette Samson
- La Mouette Skybike
- La Mouette Sphinx
- La Mouette Top Model
- La Mouette Topless
- La Mouette Top Secret

=== L.A.D. ===
(Light Aircraft Development Co.)

- L.A.D. Mita 3 Kai 1
- L.A.D. SS-2

=== Laffont-Mouillard-Cousin ===
- Laffont-Mouillard-Cousin 1915 glider

=== Lagasse ===
(Jean-René Lagasse)

- Lagasse 1901 glider
- Lagasse Cruiser
- Lagasse Éole A
- Lagasse Éole B
- Lagasse R-4
- Lagasse R-9
- Lagasse Simplex
- Lagasse Sulky
- Lagasse Sulky-Biplace

=== Laister ===
( Jack W. Laister / Laister-Kauffmann)

- Laister Yankee Doodle
- Laister Yankee Doodle 2
- Laister LP-15 Nugget
- Laister LP-46
- Laister LP-49
- Laister Universal 2-Place
- Laister-Kauffmann LK-10
- Laister-Kauffman TG-4
- Laister-Kauffman XCG-10 (Original design – completely different from later XCG-10A)
- Laister-Kauffman XCG-10A Trojan Horse

=== LAK ===
(LAK – Lietuviška Aviacinė Konstrukcija / (some production by ESAG – Eksperimentine Sportines Aviacijos Gamykla)

- LAK-2
- LAK-5 Nemunas (motor glider)
- LAK-8
- LAK-9
- LAK-10 Lietuva
- LAK-11 Nida
- LAK-12 Lietuva
- LAK-12 Lietuva 2R
- LAK-14 Strazdas
- LAK-15
- LAK-16
- LAK-17
- LAK-19
- LAK-20
- Sportinë Aviacija SL-2P (a.k.a. Kensgaila VK-7)
- LAK Genesis 2

=== Lampich ===
(Ãrpád Lampich / Gyõr Soaring Club, Gyõr)

- Gyõr-2 (Ã. Lampich)
- Lampich LS-16

=== Lamson ===
(Phil Lamson)

- Lamson PL-1 Quark

=== Lamson ===
(Robert Lamson)

- Lamson L-106 Alcor

=== Landmann ===
(Hermann Landmann – Institut für Flugzeugkonstruktion der Technischen Hochschule Dresden)

- Landmann Jupp
- Landmann La-03
- Landmann La-06
- Landmann LA-16 V-1 Lerche
- Landmann LA-16 V-2 Heidelerche
- Landmann LA-17
- Krüger Schlägel und Eisen – Hermann Landmann & Nowack

=== Landes-Derouin ===
(Landes Frères & Derouin - Robert Landes, Théo Landes and Derouin / Louis Bréguet)

- Landes-Derouin
- Landes Oiseau Bleu
- Landes-Bréguet Mouette

=== Lange ===
- Lange Antares 20E
- Lange Antares 18S/T
- Lange Antares 23E

=== Langhammer ===
(Egon Scheibe / Bitz-Linner-Zoller)

- Langhammer L-10 Libelle

=== Langley ===
(Ernest Langley)

- Langley Sailplane

=== Larson ===
- Larson Utility

=== Latimer-Needham ===
(C. H. Latimer-Needham / R.F.D. Co, Guilford)

- Latimer-Needham Albatross

=== Latvian Aero Club Olaine ===
- Vanadzins

=== Laubenthal ===
(Paul Laubenthal)

- Laubenthal Musterle
- Laubenthal Lore
- Laubenthal Württemberg

=== Lauk ===
(Peep Lauk – Estonia)

- Lauk Flying Wing – Estonia – Lauk, Peep

=== Launics ===
(Fricis Launics / 48th Glider Aviator Group, Krustpils (LU))

- Launics Krustpilietis

=== Lawrence ===
(L.W. Lawrence)

- Lawrence Water Glider

=== Lazarov ===
(Tzvetan Lazarov / DAR (Darzhavna Aeroplanna Rabotilnica) - Bozurishte, Bulgaria)

- Lazarov Polkovnik Drangov (Лазаров Дрангов)

=== LCF ===
(Luftsport-Club Friedrichshafen)

- LCF-II

=== le Bris ===
(Jean-Marie le Bris)

- le Bris Aéro-Voilier
- le Bris Albatros
- le Bris La Barque Ailée

=== Lee-Richards ===
(Cedric Lee & G. Tilghman Richards / annular wing patent from G.J.A. Kitchen, Williband Franz Zelger and Isaac Henry Storey)

- Lee-Richards 1912 annular biplane glider

=== Leeming ===
(John Fishwick LEEMING, Clement WOOD & Tom PRINCE)

- Leeming LPW

=== Leffler-MacFarlane ===
(Al Leffler, Walt MacFarlane, Bill Meyer)

- Leffler-MacFarlane LM-1

=== Lefort ===
(Lucien Lefort)

- Lefort Triplan

=== Leonard ===
(Bob Leonard)

- Leonard Annebula

=== Leonard ===
(Whitmar Leonard / Leonard Motorless Aircraft, 32 Crescent Street, N.w., Grand Rapids, Michigan)

- Leonard LPT-1
- Leonard LPT-2

=== Leroy ===
(G. Leroy (Professeur Technique à l'École Professionelle d'Évreux)/ Aéroc-Club de l'Eure)

- Leroy MP-30-CV
- Leroy Motoplaneur

=== Lesh-Wulpi ===
(Lawrence J. Lesh & James M. Wulpi)

- Lesh 1907
- Lesh-Wulpi 1908 glider

=== Letov ===
- Letov Š-17
- Letov Š-22
- Letov LF-107 Luňák
- Letov XLF-207 Laminar
- Letov KB-9 – SLANOVEC, Marjan
- Letov LG-130 Kmotr
- Letov LD-60-5

=== Let Kunovice ===
- LET L-13 Blaník
- LET L-13AC Blanik 13.85m span-aerobatic
- LET L-13J Blanik motorglider
- LET L-21 Spartak - DLOUHI, K.
- LET L-22
- LET L-23 Super Blaník
- LET L-33 Solo - MECIAR, Marian & ZAJIC,V...
- Let LF-109 Pionýr
- Let VT-16 Orlik
- Let VT-116 Orlik II
- Let TG-10

=== LETOV ===
(LETOV - Yugoslavia)

- LETOV Cavka
- LETOV Jastreb 54
- LETOV KB-1 Triglav I
- LETOV K2A Triglav II
- LETOV KB-2 Udarnik
- LETOV KB-3 Triglav III
- LETOV KB-5 Jadran
- LETOV KB-9
- LETOV KBI-14 Mačka
- LETOV (AK-ST-21) 21
- LETOV (AK-ST-22) 22
- LETOV Vrabac A

=== Leyat ===
(Marcel Leyat / Mr Audra / Association Française Aérienne)

- Leyat 1909 glider
- Leyat 1924 glider

=== LFG ===
(G. Baatz / Luftfahrzeug-Gesellschaft, Stralsund)

- LFG Boot-Phönix (LFG Phönix / LFG Phönix 3)

=== LIBIS ===
(Letalski Institut "Branko Ivanus" Slovenia)

- LIBIS-17 – PRHAVC, Jože
- LIBIS 18
- LIBIS L-22
- Libis KB-17 Kondor
- Libis KB-18

=== Lightwing ===
(Lightwing Research / John M. Lee)

- Lightwing Type 4 Rooster
- Lightwing L6FS Mouse
- Lightwing CT6 Companion

=== Lilienthal ===
(Otto Lilienthal)

- Lilienthal 1890 glider
- Lilienthal 1893 glider
- Lilienthal 1896 glider
- Lilienthal Derwitzer Glider (1891)
- Lilienthal Normalsegelapparat (1894)
- Lilienthal Standard Doppeldecker Nr 13

=== Lindner ===
(Fiberglas-Technik Rudolf Lindner)

- Lindner Phoebus B3

=== Lippisch ===
(Alexander Lippisch)

- Lippisch 1920 biplane glider
- Lippisch Zögling
- Lippisch Prüfling
- Lippisch Delta
- Lippisch Ente
- Lippisch Falke
- Lippisch Storch
- Lippisch Storch II
- Lippisch Storch III
- Lippisch Storch IV
- Lippisch Storch V
- Lippisch Storch VI
- Lippisch Storch VII
- Lippisch Storch VIII Marabu
- Lippisch Grüne Post
- Lippisch Professor
- Lippisch Wien
- Lippisch Fafnir
- Lippisch Urubu OBS
- Lippisch Fafnir 2 (São Paulo)
- Djävlar Anamma (Devil take it)

=== Liwentaal ===
(Alexandre Liwentaal)

- Liwentaal Aerostat – Alexandre Liwentaal

=== LO ===
(LO-Fluggerätebau)

- LO 120S

=== Loessl (Eugen) ===
(Eugen von Loessl - killed on the Wasserkuppe on 9 August 1920 flying the E.v.L.1)

- Lössl E.v.L.1

=== Loessl (Ernst) ===
(Ernst von Loessl - cousin of Eugen von Loessl)

- Loessl Sb.1 Münchener
- Loessl Sb.2
- Loessl Sb.3

=== Lohner ===
(Lohner Flugzeugbau)

- Lohner-Burchardt III (Wilhelm Burchardt)
- Lohner-Umlauff Rodelgleiter (Lohner & Hans von Umlauff)
- Lohner Kress (Leopold Bauer)

=== Loitron-Delage ===
(Loitron & Delage)

- Loitron-Delage 1909 glider

=== Lombarda ===
(Aeronautica Lombarda / Camillo Silva)

- Lombarda AL-3 / Silva AL-3
- Lombarda GP.1 Pinguino / Pinguino GP.1 (GP – Maurizio Garbell & Ermenegildo Preti)
- Lombarda GP.2 Asiago / Asiago GP.2
- Lombarda AL-12P
- Lombarda A.R.
- Lombarda Assalto Radioguidato

=== Lommatzsch ===
(VEB Apparatebau Lommarzsch, Raubaaerstr. 4, Lommatzsch/Sa. (DDR))

- Lommatzsch FES-530 Lehrmeister
- Lommatzsch Lom-55 I Libelle – Heinz Roessing & Landemann
- Lommatzsch Lom-57 Libelle
- Lommatzsch Lom-58 I Libelle Standard
- Lommatzsch Lom-58 II Libelle Laminar
- Lommatzsch Lom-59 Lo-Meise
- Lommatzsch Lom-61 Favorit

=== L.O.P.P. ===
(L.O.P.P. – Liga Obrony Powietrznej i Przeciwgazowej – League of Air and Anti-gas Defence / Icarus)

- L.O.P.P. Poznan Ikar

=== Loravia ===
- Loravia KV-1
- Loravia KV-2
- Loravia KV-3A
- Loravia KV-4
- Loravia LCA-10 Topaze
- Loravia LCA-11 Topaze

=== Lössl ===
(Ernst von Lössl)

- Lössl SB-1 Münchener Eindecker
- Lössl SB-2
- Lössl SB-3
- Lössl E.v.L.1
- Lössl 1920 Wasserkuppe Glider

=== Lowe-Wylde ===
(Charles H. Lowe-Wylde)

- Lowe-Wylde Columbus

=== Loyko Tandem L-1 ===
(LOYKO & Soc. Aviakim (USSR))

- Loyko Tandem L-1

=== Lucas ===
(Émile Lucas / Avions Émile Lucas)

- Lucas L-6A

=== Luków School ===
- Luków School Glider

=== Lunds Tekniske ===
- Lunds Tekniske Silhiuette

=== Lünger-Kohler ===
(Hans Lünger & Josef Kohler)

- Lünger-Kohler Beta 1

=== Lush ===
(Vladimir S. Lush)

- Lush Swift

=== Lüty ===
(Paul Lüty / Sportflugzeugbau, Hülserstrasse 398, Krefeld)

- Luty Ly-542 K Stösser

=== Lutz ===
(Werner Lutz)

- Lutz Welu-48

=== LWL ===
(Lwowskie Warsztaty Lotnicze – Lwów Aviation Workshops)

- P.W.S.101
- P.W.S.102 Rekin (Shark)
- P.W.S.103

=== Lwowskich Uczniów ===
(Kazimierz Baszniak, Wlodzimierz Siemiuła & Aleksander Sokalski)

- Lwowskich Uczniów 1910 glider

=== Lyushin Maori ===
(S. N. Lyushin)

- Lyushin Maori – S. N. Lyushin
