= List of Lithuanian gliders =

This is a list of gliders/sailplanes of the world, (this reference lists all gliders with references, where available) Note: Any aircraft can glide for a short time, but gliders are designed to glide for longer.

== Lithuanian miscellaneous constructors ==
- Bėkšta RB-11 – Romualdas Bėkšta
- BrO-11 - 1954 - by Bronius Oškinis
- Garalevičiaus-Kulvinskio GK-1 – GARALEVIČIAUS, J. & A. Kulvinskas
- LAK-9 - 1976 - by Kęstutis Gečas (ESAG)
- LAK-12 - 1979 - by Kęstutis Gečas (senior constructor at ESAG)
- LAK-14 - 1981 - by Antanas Paknys (ESAG)
- LAK-15 - 1989 - by J. Bankauskas (ESAG)
- LAK-16 - 1986 - by Gintaras Sabaliauskas and Kęstutis Leonavičius (ESAG)
- LAK-17
- LAK-19 - 2001
- LAK-20 - 2007
- LAK Genesis 2 - 1994
- BK-7 Lietuva - 1972 by Balys Karvelis
- Kensgailos Žuvėdra – Vladas Kensgaila
- Rimsa Keva – Z. Rimša
- Salaviejus Aitvaras – V. Šalaviejus
- Spriditis (glider) – Edvins Bekmanis
- Senbergas S-1 – 1922, designer V. Senbergas
- Mainelis 1932 glider designed by P. Mainelis, 2 built (based on German glider)
- Skurauskas & Mikevicius Gandras designed by Skurauskas & Mikevicius, 1 built (based on German glider)
- Salavejus primary designed by V. Salavejus primary training gliders, 2 built
- Miliunas & Kontrimas Nida designed by Miliunas & Kontrimas glider (based on German Grunau Baby)
- Gysas Nykstukas designed by A. Gysas
- Gysas Zaibas designed by A. Gysas
- Mainelis Birzietis competition sailplane, designed by P. Mainelis (based on (Gö-3 Minimoa)
- Rimsa-Miliunas Keva motorglider 1 x 28 hp Scott, designed by Z. Rimsa, built by G. Miliunas
