= Laubenthal =

Laubenthal is a German surname that may refer to

- Horst Laubenthal (born 1937), German tenor and voice teacher
- Markus Laubenthal (born 1962), German general and Chief of Staff of Supreme Headquarters Allied Powers Europe
- Paul Laubenthal, German aircraft designer
  - Laubenthal Württemberg, a single seat glider
- Rudolf Laubenthal (1886–1971), German tenor
- Sanders Anne Laubenthal (1943–2002), American poet, novelist, historian and textbook writer
