= Akaflieg Darmstadt D-28 Windspiel =

German single-seat glider, 1932

D-28 Windspiel

General information
- Type: Single-seat glider
- National origin: Germany
- Manufacturer: Akaflieg Darmstadt
- Designer: R. Kosin and R. Schomerus

History
- First flight: 1932-3

The Akaflieg Darmstadt D-28 Windspiel (English: Italian Greyhound) was a single-seat, high-performance sailplane designed in Germany in the early 1930s. Intended to exploit a growing understanding of thermal soaring, it was small and manoeuvrable, with a 12 m span; silk-covered for lightness, it weighed less (empty) than its pilots. It held the world straight-line distance record for a time in 1934.

== Design and development ==
The Akademische Fliegergruppe of the Technical University of Darmstadt was first formed in 1921. It was, and is, a group of aeronautical students who design and construct aircraft as part of their studies and with the help and encouragement of their university. They began with gliders optimised for hill soaring with long span, high aspect ratio wings. By the early 1930s, partly through the experiences of the Darmstadt Musterle in the US, there was a better understanding of "blue" thermals and the Darmstadt group sought to exploit these small, weak currents with a light, manoeuvrable aircraft that could stay within their rising columns. The result was the D-28 Windspiel, combining a 12 m (39 ft 4 in) span with the lowest weight achievable with the plywood and fabric materials of the time.

The D-28 was a wood-framed aircraft with a high, cantilever, single-spar wing, Akaflieg's established layout. It utilised the high-lift-to-drag ratio Göttingen 535 profile that Akaflieg had used on the Konsul and Darmstadt, though thinned by 10% to reduce drag. The structure also followed Akaflieg's previous use of wooden frames and stress-bearing plywood skin on the fuselage and leading edges of flying surfaces, with fabric covering elsewhere, but with greater attention to precision, the removal of unneeded material and metering of adhesives. The wing leading edge ply was only 1 mm (0.039 in) thick, and the fuselage was constructed without longerons. Instead of the standard aircraft linen, for lightness the Windspiel was covered in silk. The empty weight of the completed Windspiel was 55.5 kg (112 lb), a good deal less than that of most of its pilots.

In plan, the wing was straight-tapered with elliptical tips. The whole of the trailing edge was occupied by camber-changing flaperons, attached to selected ribs rather than to a subsidiary spar as usual, another weight-saving measure. The hinge gap was sealed with 500 μm (0.02 in) ply strips. The wing was mounted, as with several earlier Akaflieg sailplane, on a narrow, faired pylon, with the cockpit in front of it and under the leading edge. The upper fuselage from the nose to the front of the pylon was detachable in a single piece, together with the cellophane single curvature glazing, so the pilot could access the cockpit. The Windspiel's fuselage was slender and oval in cross section, with a short skid under the centre section and small tail bumper as an undercarriage. The horizontal tail was straight-tapered, with the tailplane fixed to the top of the fuselage and carrying elevators with a central cut-out for rudder movement. The tall, straight-edged rudder was an all-moving one, but of an unusual design, divided vertically into two sections, with the front part carrying the rear surface. When the front surface moved, the larger-area, deeper rear surface further deflected by the same amount again, presenting a cambered surface. As on the Konsul, the rudder and ailerons were interconnected to ease yaw correction in turns.

The date of the first flight is uncertain, but building was planned to start over the winter of 1931–32, and the Windspiel was performing record flights by early 1934. As its careful construction was slow, taking some 7,000 hours, a 1933 date is plausible. In flight it achieved the tight turns required to stay within small thermals; a medium-level turn with a bank angle of 25° produced an 80 m (260 ft) radius circle.

After its 1935 accident and rebuild, the Windspiel was a little heavier, but the only major alteration was the separation of the full-span flaperons into inboard flaps and outboard ailerons.

== Operational history ==
On 16 June 1934 (Note: Simons dates this to March 1934.) the Windspiel, piloted by Hans Fischer, set a new world glider straight-line distance record of 240 km (149 mi) with a flight from Griesheim, Darmstadt to Thonneheim, Montmédy in France. On 9 June 1935 Fischer demonstrated the manoeuvrability of the Windspiel at an aircraft display day organised by the Aero Club de Portugal at the Amadora airfield near Lisbon. Glider aerobatics were a novelty at the time.

The accident which led to the rebuild as the D-28B occurred at Griesheim in 1935. The D-28 was on the ground with Fischer aboard when an aircraft landed on the glider. It was wrecked but Fischer escaped with bruising. Rebuilt about 12% heavier, it was still capable of good performance. Hans Osann flew it from Darmstadt into the Netherlands, a distance of 275 km (171 mi). At the ISTUS meeting at Salzburg in 1937, he was one of a group to fly across the Alps.

Later the D-28B was one of a group of sailplanes that pioneered thermal soaring in the Sahara. Though it flew well enough, this experiment with a very light glider did not lead to a new sailplane class. Its performance was not superior to larger, long-span aircraft which were cheaper to build and more robust in the air and on the ground.

== Variants ==
D-28
Original version.
D-28b
Result of rebuild after ground accident. About 16 kg (35 lb) heavier, flaps and aileron separated.

== Specifications (D-28b) ==
Data from Sailplanes 1920–1945Flugzeug-Typenbuch. Handbuch der deutschen Luftfahrt- und Zubehör-Industrie 1944

General characteristics

- Crew: 1
- Length: 5.98 m (19 ft 7 in)
- Wingspan: 12.00 m (39 ft 4 in)
- Height: 1.07 m (3 ft 6 in)
- Wing area: 11.4 m^{2} (123 sq ft)
- Length de-rigged: 12.5 m (41 ft)
- Width de-rigged (without tailplane): 1.2 m (3 ft 11 in)
- Height de-rigged: 1.45 m (4 ft 9 in)
- Aspect ratio: 12.63
- Airfoil: Göttingen 535 thinned by 10%
- Empty weight: 72 kg (159 lb) structure
- Gross weight: 152 kg (335 lb) in flight

Performance

- Maximum glide ratio: 23:1 at 56 km/h (35 mph; 30 kn)
- Rate of sink: 0.58 m/s (114 ft/min) at 48 km/h (30 mph; 26 kn)
- Wing loading: 13.3 kg/m^{2} (2.7 lb/sq ft)
