= D41 =

D41 may refer to:

- Akaflieg Darmstadt D-41, a German sailplane
- D41 road (Croatia)
- HMAS Brisbane (D 41), a Perth-class destroyer of the Royal Australian Navy
- HMS Curacoa (D41), a C-class light cruiser of the Royal Navy
- HMS Walpole (D41), a W-class destroyer of the Royal Navy
- Nissan Frontier (D41), a pickup truck
- LNER Class D41, a class of British steam locomotives
