= Libel (disambiguation) =

A libel is a malicious statement in written media, a broadcast, or otherwise published words.

Libel may also refer to:

- Libel (2020 EP) by Nigerian singer Brymo
- Libel!, a 1934 play by Edward Wooll
- Libel (film) a 1959 British drama film based on the play
- Libel (poetry), a verse genre primarily of the Renaissance
- Libel (Rychnov nad Kněžnou District), a municipality and village in the Czech Republic
- Libel (admiralty law), a proceeding in admiralty law
- Criminal Lible, a legal term
- Seditious libel, an offense under common law

== See also ==
- Seditious libel, a criminal offence under English common law, related to attacks on the government or the church
- Blasphemous libel, a former common law criminal offence in England and Wales
- Blood libel, sensationalized allegations that a person or group engages in human sacrifice
- Libelle (disambiguation), various meanings
