= Libelle =

Libelle may refer to:

== Aircraft ==
- Dornier Libelle, a German flying boat
  - Dornier Do 12 Libelle III
- Flylight Libelle, a British powered hang glider
- Glasflügel H-201 Standard Libelle, a German glider
  - Glasflügel 205 Club Libelle
  - Glasflügel H-301 Libelle
- Lom-55, 57 and 58 Libelle, gliders by Lommatzsch, East Germany

== Arts, entertainment and media ==
- Libelle (literary genre), a political pamphlet or book which slanders a public figure
- Libelle (Belgian magazine), a weekly women's magazine published in Flanders, Belgium
- Libelle (Dutch magazine), a women's weekly magazine published in the Netherlands
- Libelle of Englyshe Polycye, a fifteenth-century poem
- Die Libelle (The Dragonfly) Op. 204, a dance by Josef Strauss, 1866

== Other uses ==
- Libelle (barque), a German sailing ship 1864–1866
- Libelle (cipher), a German cipher system
- Libelle (microcar), an Austrian 1950s vehicle
- Libelle, a fast jet aircrew g-suit
- Operation Libelle, an evacuation of German Armed Forces from Tirana, 1997
- Project 131 Libelle Torpedo Boat, or Libelle Klasse, East German torpedo boats

== See also ==
- Libelluloidea, a superfamily of dragonflies
- Libel, or defamation
