= Lore (glider) =

German single-seat glider, 1929

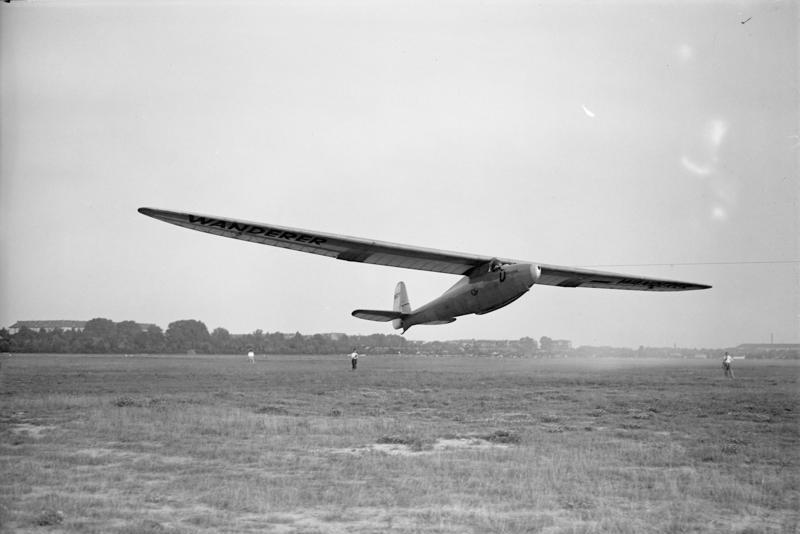
- Musterle

General information
- Type: Single seat glider
- National origin: Germany
- Designer: Paul Laubenthal
- Number built: 2 (Lore and Musterle)

History
- First flight: 1929

Lore and a copy, Musterle, were high performance sailplanes designed at Darmstadt by Paul Laubenthal. Lore was flown successfully by the well known glider pilot Wolf Hirth at the 1929 Rhön (Wasserkuppe) glider competition. Musterle was used by Hirth to demonstrate the possibilities of "blue sky" thermalling for the first time.

== Design and development ==
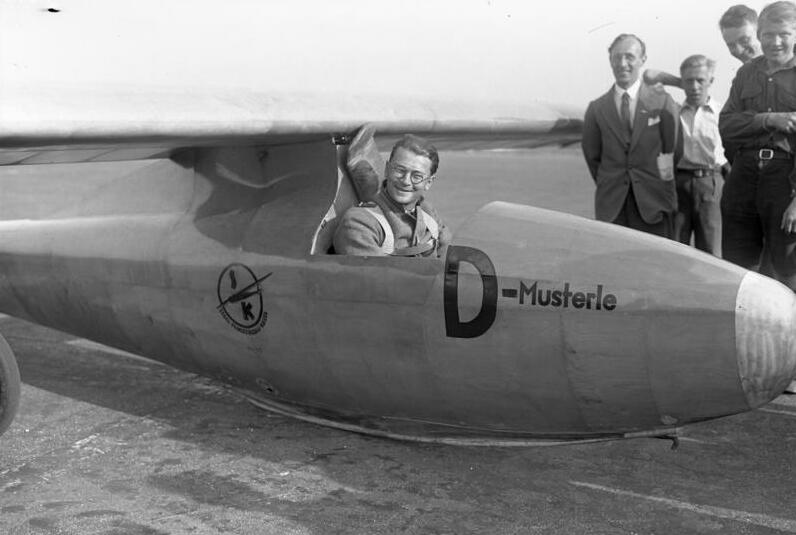
Wolf Hirth in his Musterle in 1931

The Akademische Fliegeruppe Darmstadt, founded in 1921, was the first of several Akafliegs associated with German universities intended to give student teams experience of aircraft design. They rapidly acquired a good reputation for inventive glider design. As well as designing and building aircraft as part of their academic programme, they also received some orders from individuals or clubs. These, built in ones or twos, brought welcome funds to the group. In 1928-9 Paul Laubenthal, then at the Akaflieg, designed a Darmstadt sailplane, built by Klemm Leichtflugzeugbau, for the Würtenburger gliding club. This was a development of an earlier Darmstadt glider named after the club. The new machine was named Lore; flown by Wolf Hirth it was one of the most successful competitors at the 1929 Rhön glider contest. Hirth then ordered a copy for himself, built in Kassel, named Musterle. This example became even better known than the original because, with it, Hirth was the first to soar using blue sky thermals, thermals unassociated with cumulus clouds. The two aircraft had similar characteristics though Musterle was about 40 kg (88 lb) heavier.

Musterle was a high, cantilever wing aircraft. Its wing, like the rest of the aircraft was wooden and covered with a mixture of plywood and fabric. It was built around a single spar with ply covering from it around the leading edge forming a torsion-resistant D-box. Behind the spar the wing was mostly fabric covered. In plan there was a rectangular centre section that filled about 40% of the span and tapered outer panels tapering to elliptical tips. The ailerons initially filled about 45% of the span and reached the tips, though they were later extended inboard almost to the centre section.

Musterle's wing was mounted over the fuselage on a low, ply covered pylon which blended into the fuselage and extended well behind the wing trailing edge, gradually decreasing in height. The fuselage was ply covered and ovoid in cross section, formed by ply covering over three longerons held in transverse frames; it was distinctly pointed on its underside and tapered aft. The cockpit was just ahead of the wing under a removable, largely ply cover; the only transparencies were the windscreen and a small rectangular roof window, though there were open circular portholes on either side. All tail surfaces were built in a similar way to the wing. Both the tall rudder and elevators were all-moving and balanced, with straight edges and rounded tips. The elevators were mounted on top of the fuselage and the rudder extended down to the keel, so a generous cut-out in the elevators was provided for its movement. Musterle had a landing skid under the forward fuselage, reaching back almost to the wing trailing edge, and a spring type tailskid.

== Operational history ==
In 1930 Hirth took Musterle to the US National Championships held at Harris Hill, New York equipped with a variometer, an instrument unknown outside Germany and previously only used by Robert Kronfeld in the RRG Professor two years earlier. On 5 October he flew a cross country, blue sky thermal flight for the first time. The following spring, on 10 March 1931, he flew over New York using ridge lift from the Hudson River until signalled to come down by police because he was causing a traffic hazard.

Flown by different pilots, both Lore and Musterle survived to take part together in the 1934 Rhön competition.

== Specifications (Musterle) ==
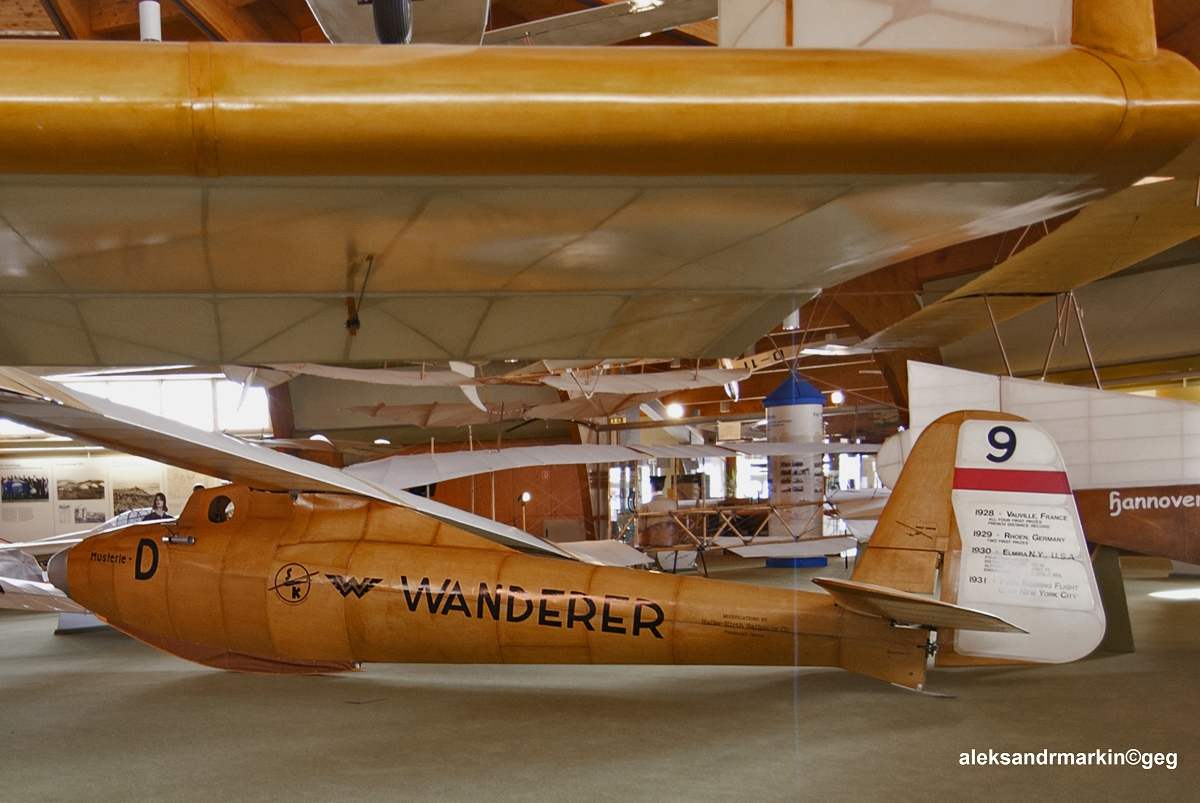
The Musterle Replica

Data from Sailplanes 1920-1945.

General characteristics

- Crew: One
- Length: 6.50 m (21 ft 4 in)
- Wingspan: 16.00 m (52 ft 6 in)
- Wing area: 15.75 m^{2} (169.5 sq ft)
- Aspect ratio: 16.4
- Airfoil: Göttingen 535
- Empty weight: 198 kg (437 lb)
- Gross weight: 285 kg (628 lb)
- Wing loading: 16 kg/m^{2} (3.3 lb/sqft)

== See also ==
Related lists

- List of gliders
