= Akaflieg Darmstadt D-17 Darmstadt =

German single-seat glider, 1927

D-17 Darmstadt

General information
- Type: Single seat glider
- National origin: Germany
- Manufacturer: Akaflieg Darmstadt
- Designer: H. Völker

History
- First flight: 1927

The Akaflieg Darmstadt D-17 Darmstadt, also called the Darmstadt D-17 and Darmstadt I, was a high performance, single seat, cantilever monoplane sailplane, designed and built by a German University student design group in 1927. It was followed in 1928 by the Akaflieg Darmstadt D-19 Darmstadt 2, a similar aircraft with a new profile, longer span wing.

== Development ==
The Akademische Fliegergruppe of the Technical University of Darmstadt was first formed in 1921. It was, and is, a group of aeronautical students who design and construct aircraft as part of their studies and with the help and encouragement of their University. By 1927 the group were producing a range of designs traceable back to their 1923 Konsul and some of these were professionally built outside the University. The D-17, originally known simply as the Darmstadt and later as the Darmstadt 1, was one such.

The D-17 was a wood framed aircraft with a high, cantilever, single spar wing with stressed plywood covering from the spar to the leading edge and fabric covered aft. Its 16 m (52 ft 6 in) was built in three parts, a 6 m (19 ft 9 in) inner section with constant chord and thickness and outer panels which tapered in both chord and thickness to elliptical tips. The D-17 had the thick, high lift to drag ratio Göttingen 535 profile that Akaflieg had first used on the Konsul. Ailerons mounted on slightly angled hinges occupied the whole trailing edges of the outer panels. No flaps, airbrakes or spoilers were fitted, normal for the time.

The fuselage of the Darmstadt was a plywood skinned, oval cross sectioned semi-monocoque, slightly tapered and more rounded towards the tail. The open, unscreened cockpit was placed immediately ahead of the wing leading edge with the pilot's head against the front of a low, long chord, faired pylon which supported the wing. A short undercarriage skid was attached to the fuselage underside, aided by a small tailskid. The D-17 had all moving tail surfaces with straight edges, rounded tips and tapered by forward sweep on their trailing edges. The large rudder extended to the keel, moving in a cut-out in the one piece elevator.

In 1928 a close relative of the D-17, the D-19 Darmstadt 2, was flown. Designed by F. Gross, the main difference between it and the D-17 was the wing which had a 2 m (6 ft 7 in) greater span, making the D-19 an 18 m (59 ft 1 in) sailplane. The central panel span was increased to 7.62 m (25 ft). The D-19's wing area was only slightly higher, with the result that the aspect ratio was increased from 15.4 to 19.4. The D-19 used a more symmetric Joukowsky profile in place of the strongly cambered Göttingen 535, so decreasing the pitching moment; over the outer panels the thickness/chord ratio reduced continuously from 15% to 8. There were also smaller refinements around the cockpit and pylon and a deeper, less rounded fuselage profile.

== Operational history ==
The D-17 took part in the 1927 Rhön (Wasserkuppe) gliding competitions. Piloted by Johannes Nehring, it set a new hill soaring distance record at 51.8 km (36.1 mi). In early 1928 it went to the United States where Peter Hesselbach flew it over the dunes of Cape Cod, one flight lasting four hours. The flights attracted much publicity and caught the attention of the young Schweizer brothers who later became important glider designers. The Darmstadt was damaged in a collision with a flagpole at the Cape, then was sold and rebuilt with improvements to the cockpit including its enclosure under smooth glazing which merged into the upper pylon line. Renamed the Chanute in honour of the aviation pioneer Octave Chanute, it was mostly flown by Jack O'Meara. Flight reported that a Darmstadt, as well as a Darmstadt 2, flew at the Rhön meeting in August 1930. The quoted span suggests this Darmstadt, which won the junior endurance prize with a flight of 3 hr 19 min, was another Akaflieg Darmstadt model, but if It was the D-17, then two of the latter were built.

The D-19 appeared at least three consecutive Rhön meetings (1928–30), setting a record of 71.2 km (44.3 mi) in 1928 then bettering it with 72.3 km (44.9 mi) the following year. It appeared there for the last time in 1934, after which it was lost during a Scandinavian tour.

== Variants ==
D-17 Darmstadt
16 m span.
D-17 Chanute
The D-17 with an enclosed cockpit.
D-19 Darmstadt 2
New 18 m, Joukowski profile wing .

== Specifications (D-17 Darmstadt 1) ==
Data from Sailplanes 1920-1945

General characteristics

- Crew: 1
- Length: 6.37 m (20 ft 11 in)
- Wingspan: 16.00 m (52 ft 6 in)
- Wing area: 16.6 m^{2} (179 sq ft)
- Aspect ratio: 15.4
- Airfoil: Göttingen 535
- Empty weight: 170 kg (375 lb) structure
- Gross weight: 250 kg (551 lb) in flight

Performance

- Wing loading: 15.1 kg/m^{2} (3.1 lb/sq ft)
