= Darmstadt D-18 =

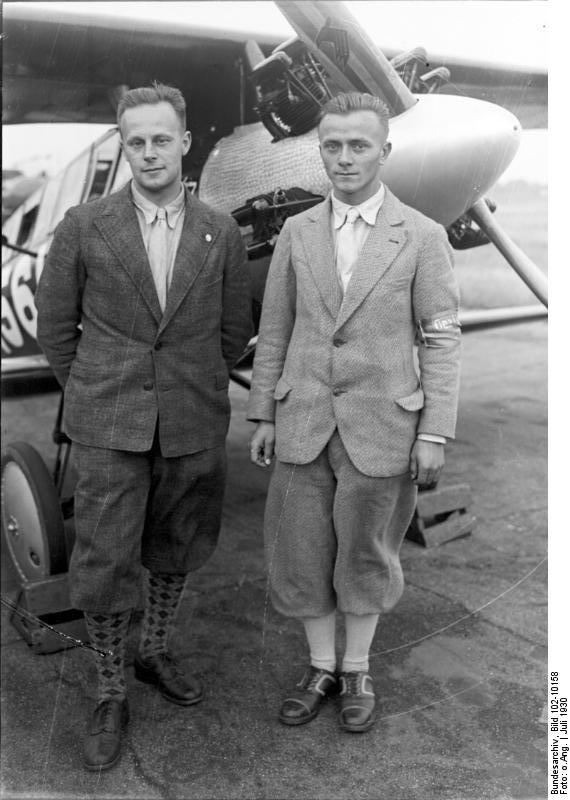
- Rudolf Neininger (left) with his crewman in front of the D-18 during Challenge 1930

General information
- Type: Sportsplane
- Manufacturer: Akaflieg Darmstadt
- Status: Prototype
- Primary user: Germany
- Number built: 1

History
- Manufactured: 1929
- First flight: 1929
- Variant: Darmstadt D-22

The Darmstadt D-18 was a German light sports aircraft that was designed and built in the late-1920s by the Akaflieg Darmstadt of the Technische Universität Darmstadt.

== Design and development ==
The aircraft was designed by F. Fecher and students in the aeronautical engineering department of the Technische Universität Darmstadt. It was a development of the D-16 project, that was designed for a sports aircraft contest organized by Idaflieg in 1926. The D-16 design with a 40-horsepower (hp) engine won the first prize, but was not built as the designer decided to strengthen the construction and fit a more powerful 88 hp Armstrong Siddeley Genet radial engine. The result was the D-18, a single aircraft was built in 1929.

The aircraft was a cantilever biplane, with an upper wing placed low above a fuselage and ahead of a lower wing. Particular thought was given to aerodynamics and lightness and the aircraft was small, with a streamlined profile. Initially the D-18 had two open cockpits, but by 1930 it had been modified and fitted with a closed canopy covering both cockpits.

== Operational history ==
The aircraft carried the registration of D-1561. It took part in the Challenge 1929 international tourist plane contest, piloted by Johannes Nehring, being one of the fastest planes in the contest. It was the best aircraft in the fuel consumption trial and, along with two other aircraft, won the first part of the contest - the technical trials. However, the D-18 dropped out due to a forced landing near Września before Poznań on 11 August 1929, during a rally around Europe, because of a fuel pipe clogging. The aircraft turned over and suffered damage; its passenger was injured.

The aircraft was repaired and, now fitted with an enclosed cabin, it took part in another contest, Challenge 1930, again piloted by Rudolf Neininger. On 26 July 1930, during a rally around Europe the D-18 was forced to ditch in the Mediterranean Sea between Barcelona and Nîmes due to breaking a piston. The crew was rescued by a passing ship that also recovered the wreckage.

== Specifications ==
=== Description ===
Wooden construction cantilever biplane of extreme stagger. Fuselage oval in cross-section, plywood covered. Single-spar wings, plywood and canvas covered. Aileron on lower wing only Wings were dismounted and folded. Two crew cockpits in tandem, later covered with a common multi-part canopy. Fixed landing gear with a rear skid. Five-cylinder radial engine in the cowled nose with its cylinders projecting for cooling. Two-blade propeller.

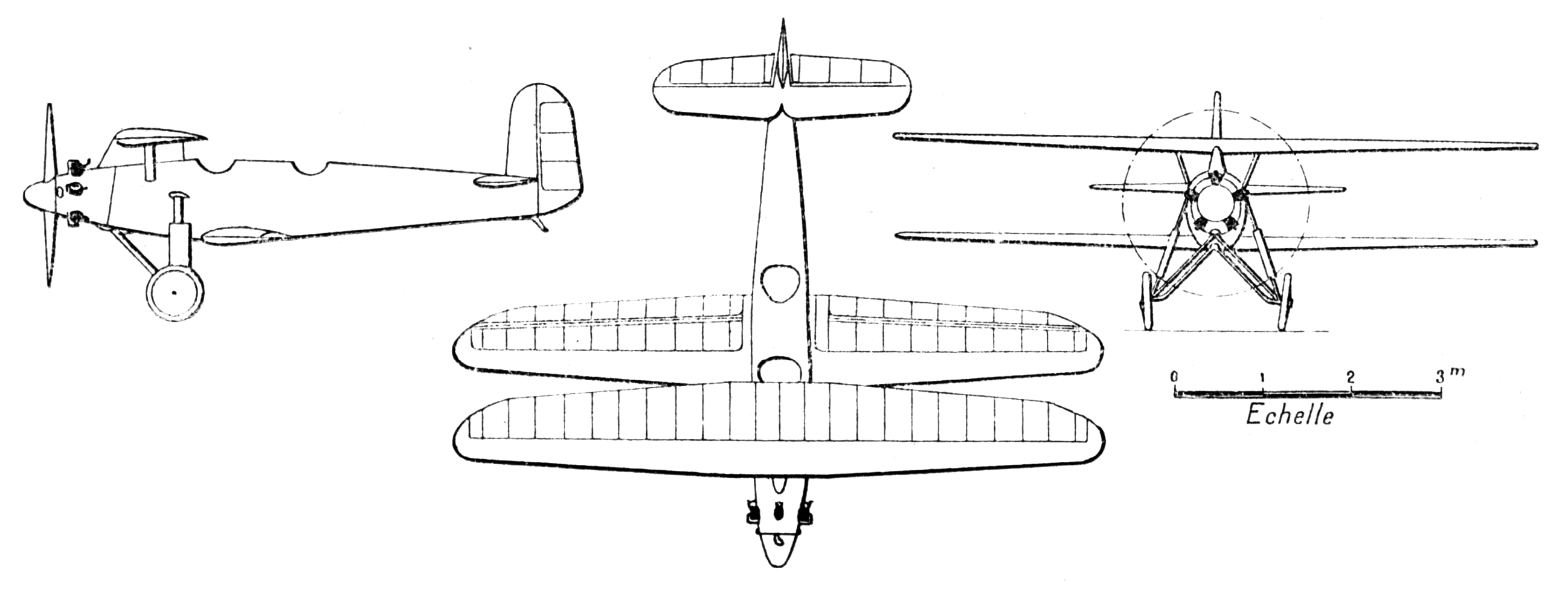
Darmstadt D-18 3-view drawing from L'Aéronautique August,1929

Data from Les Ailes, March 1929

General characteristics

- Crew: Two
- Length: 6.14 m (20 ft 2 in)
- Wingspan: 7.20 m (23 ft 7 in)
- Height: 2.62 m (8 ft 7 in)
- Wing area: 12.10 m^{2} (130.2 sq ft)
- Empty weight: 400 kg (882 lb) approximately
- Powerplant: 1 × Armstrong-Siddeley Genet 5-cylinder radial, 60 kW (80 hp)
- Propellers: 2-bladed

Performance

- Maximum speed: 200 km/h (120 mph, 110 kn)
- Range: 800 km (500 mi, 430 nmi)
- Time to altitude: 3 min to 1,000 m (3,300 ft)
