= Glaser-Dirks DG-100 =

German glider, 1974

DG-100

General information
- Type: Club class (formerly Standard class) sailplane
- National origin: Germany
- Manufacturer: Glaser-Dirks/DG Flugzeugbau
- Designer: Wilhelm Dirks
- Number built: 327

History
- First flight: 10 May 1974
- Developed from: Akaflieg Darmstadt D-38

The Glaser-Dirks DG-100 is the first sailplane manufactured by Glaser-Dirks. It is a standard class glider designed by Wilhelm Dirks in 1974 and developed from the Akaflieg Darmstadt D-38.

== Development ==
The first model had an all-flying tailplane, with anti-balance tabs along the entire trailing edges, and a two-piece canopy (movable and fixed parts), built of GFRP (glass-fibre reinforced plastic)/foam sandwich materials and resin impregnated rovings for high strength parts. Successive developments included the DG-100G, DG-101 and DG-101G. Most models are available with water ballast bags in the wings.

The DG-101 and DG-101G had improvements such as a single-piece front-hinged canopy, improved crash resistant cockpit and a conventional tailplane (with fixed horizontal stabilizer and articulated elevator). There was also a club version of this sailplane with fixed landing gear. All models featured top-surface-only air brakes.

Some later models were also manufactured by the Elan company in Slovenia and can be identified by the word "ELAN" on the fuselage and rudder. The serial number of these gliders is prefixed with "E".

Although these gliders were designed in the 1970s, they are still popular in the Club class and remain competitive in Sports class contests (which are handicapped).

The wing's control surface hookups are non-automatic and utilize L'Hotellier fittings, which must be secured by a secondary means such as a safety pin, safety wire, Uerling Sleeve or Wedekind Sleeve (See this web page for more details on this subject).

The Glaser-Dirks Company declared bankruptcy, after which the newly organized company DG Flugzeugbau GmbH assumed responsibility for servicing the gliders.

== Variants ==
Akaflieg Darmstadt D-38
The prototype designed and built at Darmstadt University of Technology.
DG-100
The initial production version developed by Wilhelm Dirks.
DG-100G
Later production with a conventional tailplane and elevator in place of the all-flying tailplane.
DG-100 Club / Club DG
An unballasted, fixed gear version with a gross weight of 385 kg / 849 lb..
DG-101
The DG-101 introduced a one-piece full length canopy that opened forwards, but retaining the all-flying tail.
DG-101G
Ultimate production version with the one-piece canopy and the conventional tailplane with elevator.

== Specifications (DG-100) ==
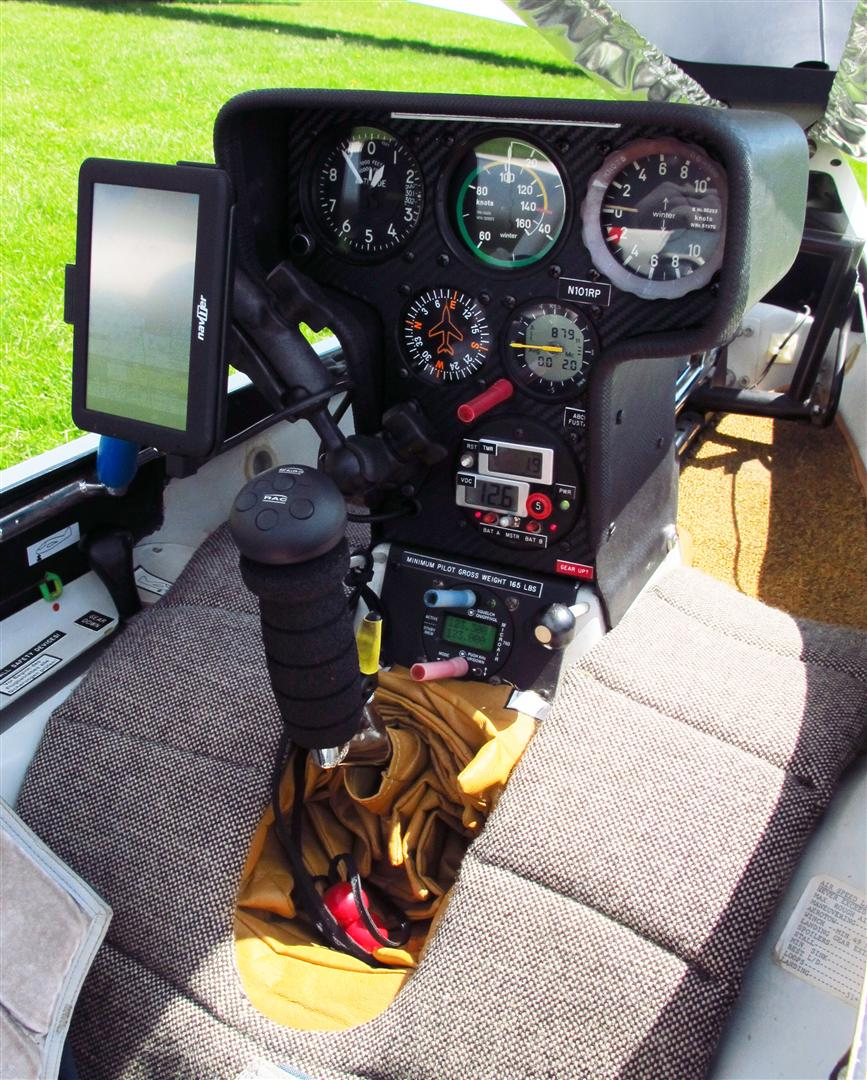
Cockpit of a DG-101G ELAN Glider

Data from Jane's All The World's Aircraft 1982–83.

General characteristics

- Crew: One pilot
- Capacity: 100 kg (220 lb) water ballast
- Length: 7.00 m (22 ft 11.75 in)
- Wingspan: 15.00 m (49 ft 2.5 in)
- Height: 1.4 m (4 ft 7 in)
- Wing area: 11.0 m^{2} (118.4 sq ft)
- Aspect ratio: 20.5:1
- Empty weight: 230 kg (507 lb)
- Gross weight: 418 kg (921 lb)

Performance

- Maximum speed: 260 km/h (161 mph, 140 kn)
- Maximum glide ratio: 39:1
- Rate of sink: 0.59 m/s (116 ft/min)

== See also ==
Related lists

- List of gliders
