= Langhammer =

Langhammer is a German surname. Notable people with this surname include:

- Arthur Langhammer (1854–1901), German painter
- Daniel Langhamer, Czech footballer
- Fred Langhammer, American business executive
- Jakub Langhammer (born 1984), Czech ice hockey player
- Maria Langhammer (born 1962), Swedish singer and actor
- Mark Langhammer, Northern Irish trade unionist
- Uwe Langhammer (born 1965), East German pole vaulter
