= Akaflieg Darmstadt D-38 =

German single-seat glider, 1972

D-38

General information
- Type: Single-seat Standard Class sailplane
- National origin: Germany
- Manufacturer: Akaflieg Darmstadt

History
- First flight: 19 December 1972
- Developed into: Glaser-Dirks DG-100

The Akaflieg Darmstadt D-38 is a German, single-seat, Standard Class sailplane that was designed and built by the Fliegergruppe of Darmstadt University.

== Design ==
The D-38 is a cantilever, shoulder-wing monoplane with a glassfibre/balsa sandwich shell structure fuselage and wing, the wing has no flaps and has a T-tail. The pilot has a semi-reclining seat in an enclosed cockpit with a transparent canopy and the landing gear is a manual retracting monowheel gear with a tailskid. The D-38 was, in effect, the prototype of the successful Glaser-Dirks DG-100 competition Standard class glider.

== Specifications ==
Data from Jane's All the World's Aircraft 1973-74

General characteristics

- Crew: 1
- Length: 6.96 m (22 ft 10 in)
- Wingspan: 15.00 m (49 ft 2.5 in)
- Height: 1.49 m (4 ft 7 in)
- Wing area: 11.00 m^{2} (118.4 sq ft)
- Empty weight: 207 kg (456 lb)
- Gross weight: 363 kg (800 lb)

Performance

- Maximum speed: 250 km/h (115 mph, 100 kn)
- Stall speed: 66 km/h (41 mph, 36 kn)
- g limits: ±6.3
- Maximum glide ratio: 39
- Rate of sink: 0.6 m/s (120 ft/min)

== See also ==
Related lists

- List of gliders
