= Akaflieg Darmstadt D-7 Margarete =

German two-seat glider, 1923

D-7 Margarete
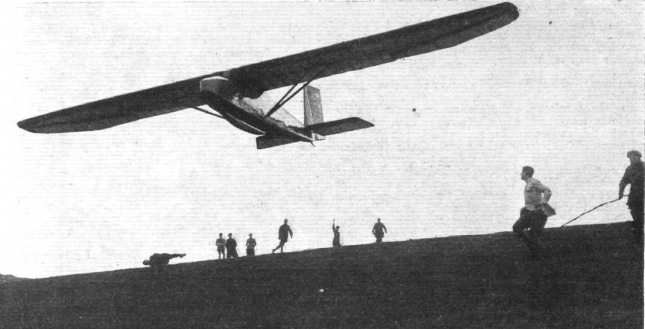

General information
- Type: Two seat glider
- National origin: Germany
- Manufacturer: Akaflieg Darmstadt
- Designer: Fritz Hoppe, R. Kercher and E.Schatzki
- Number built: 1

History
- First flight: 1923

The Akaflieg Darmstadt D-7 Margarete, often shortened to Darmstadt D-7 Margarete, was one of the earliest two seat monoplane gliders, designed and built by German university students in 1923.

== Development ==
The Akademische Fliegergruppe of the Technical University of Darmstadt was first formed in 1921. It was, and is, a group of aeronautical students who design and construct aircraft as part of their studies and with the help and encouragement of their University. The 1923 D-7 monoplane was their first two-seat design and one of the first of its kind, though the Fokker FG-2 two seat biplane glider flew the previous year; the D-7 was named after the wife of an Akaflieg Darmstadt student killed at the first Rhön (Wasserkuppe) glider meeting in 1920.

The Margarete was a wood-framed aircraft with a high, braced, two spar wing with ply covering from the front spar to the leading edge and fabric covered aft. The wing had a thick and cambered profile inboard of the tips, which had a thinner and more symmetric profile. Initially the wing plan was rectangular, with triangular ailerons mounted on straight hinges which were attached to the front spar at the tips, reaching the trailing edge inboard. Later, the aileron area was reduced, partly by cropping them inboard and also by tapering their trailing edges and rounding their tips. Each wing was braced from the lower fuselage with an asymmetric, V-form, streamlined strut to the two spars at about one-third span.

The fuselage was plywood covered with a flat top, deep, slightly curved sides and a V-shaped bottom. The nose was blunt and the open, unscreened cockpit used for solo flying was well forward of the wing leading edge. The separate second cockpit was under the wing, close to the centre of gravity so that its occupation did not seriously affect the trim. The wing centre section was supported above this cockpit on an extension of the upper rear fuselage, which dropped away aft to become slender at the tail. There was a short undercarriage skid attached directly to the fuselage underside, aided by a small tailskid. A narrow, triangular, ply covered fin carried a fabric covered, trapezoidal rudder which extended to the bottom of the fuselage. The fabric covered tailplane was mounted on the top of the fuselage; in plan, tailplane and elevators were straight edged, only slightly tapered and with angled tips. A small elevator cut-out allowed rudder movement.

== Operational history ==
The D-7 Margarete first flew in 1923 and took part in both the 1923 and 1924 Rhön events, setting an unofficial record at the latter with a passenger-carrying flight of 21 minutes. It was later used for passenger flights, though not for basic training, until it was written off in 1927 when an aileron cable broke during landing.

== Specifications ==
Data from Sailplanes 1920-1945

General characteristics

- Crew: 2
- Length: 7.65 m (25 ft 1 in)
- Wingspan: 15.30 m (50 ft 2 in)
- Wing area: 25 m^{2} (270 sq ft)
- Aspect ratio: 9.36
- Airfoil: Göttingen 533 at root, more symmetrical at tip
- Empty weight: 180 kg (397 lb) structure
- Gross weight: 320 kg (705 lb) in flight

Performance

- Wing loading: 12.8 kg/m^{2} (2.6 lb/sq ft)
