= Laubenthal Württemberg =

German single-seat glider, 1927

Württemberg

General information
- Type: Single seat glider
- National origin: Germany
- Manufacturer: Akaflieg Darmstadt / Klemm Leichtflugzeugbau GmbH ("Klemm Light Aircraft Company")
- Designer: Paul Laubenthal
- Number built: 2

History
- First flight: 1927

The Laubenthal Württemberg, sometimes known after its constructors as the Akaflieg Darmstadt Württemberg, was a single seat glider designed by Paul Laubenthal and built at the University of Darmstadt for Wolf Hirth, who won four prizes in it at an international competition in France in 1928. A second machine was built in 1929 by the Klemm Leichtflugzeugbau GmbH ("Klemm Light Aircraft Company").

== Design and development ==
The Akademische Fliegeruppe (Akaflieg) Darmstadt, founded in 1921, was the first of several Akafliegs associated with German universities intended to give annually changing student teams experience of aircraft design. They rapidly acquired a good reputation for inventive glider design. Though most of their aircraft were intended for their own use and investigation and were given Darmstadt D-numbers such as the D-6 Geheimrat, they also received some orders from individuals or club and these, built in ones or twos, were client-named, received no D-number and brought funds to the group. These, too, were sometimes also designed by student teams and often built by them.

The Württemberg was made for Wolf Hirth, who named it after his home state. The Württemberg was a high, cantilever wing aircraft. Its wing, like the rest of the aircraft was wooden and covered with a mixture of plywood and fabric. It was built around a single spar. with plywood covering from it around the leading edge forming a torsion-resistant D-box. Behind the spar the wing was mostly fabric-covered. In plan there was a rectangular centre section that filled about 40% of the span, and tapered outer panels tapering to elliptical tips. The ailerons filled about 40% of the span from the tips.

The Württemberg's wing was mounted over the fuselage on a low, plywood-covered pylon which sat on top of the fuselage and extended well behind the wing trailing edge, gradually decreasing in height. Its open, unscreened cockpit was partly under the leading edge. The fuselage was ovoid in cross section, tapering and becoming more pointed on its underside aft. It was entirely plywood covered. All tail surfaces were built in a similar way to the wing. Both rudder and elevators were all-moving and balanced, with straight edges, rounded tips and with their short mountings faired into the fuselage. The rudder extended down to the keel, and a generous cut-out in the elevators was provided for its movement. The Württemberg had a short landing skid under the forward fuselage and a spring type tailskid.

A second Württemberg was completed in 1929 at the Klemm Leichtflugzeugbau GmbH ("Klemm Light Aircraft Company") for the Württembergischer Luftfahrt-Verband (Aeronautical Association Württemberg) at Stuttgart, with slightly greater wing area and a shorter fuselage.

== Operational history ==
In 1928 Hirth flew the Württemberg in France at the International contest at Vauville, on the Channel coast near Cherbourg, with great success. Glider flight here followed the coast over sandhills and relied on slope lift from a West wind; the Württemberg was suited to the weak wind that blew during the competition. He won prizes for the greatest height gain (327 m (1,073 ft)), straight-line distance (29 km (18 mi)), height (1,244 m (4,080 ft)) and for the number of flights lasting more than 30 minutes (10).

== Specifications (Württemberg (1927)) ==
Data from Sailplanes 1920-1945

General characteristics

- Crew: One
- Length: 6.465 m (21 ft 3 in)
- Wingspan: 15.20 m (49 ft 10 in)
- Wing area: 15.75 m^{2} (169.5 sq ft)
- Aspect ratio: 14.6
- Airfoil: Göttingen 535
- Empty weight: 149.25 kg (329 lb)
- Gross weight: 235 kg (518 lb)
- Wing loading: 15 kg/m^{2} (3.1 lb/sqft)

== See also ==
Related lists

- List of gliders
