= Akaflieg Darmstadt D-29 =

German experimental monoplane

Darmstadt D-29
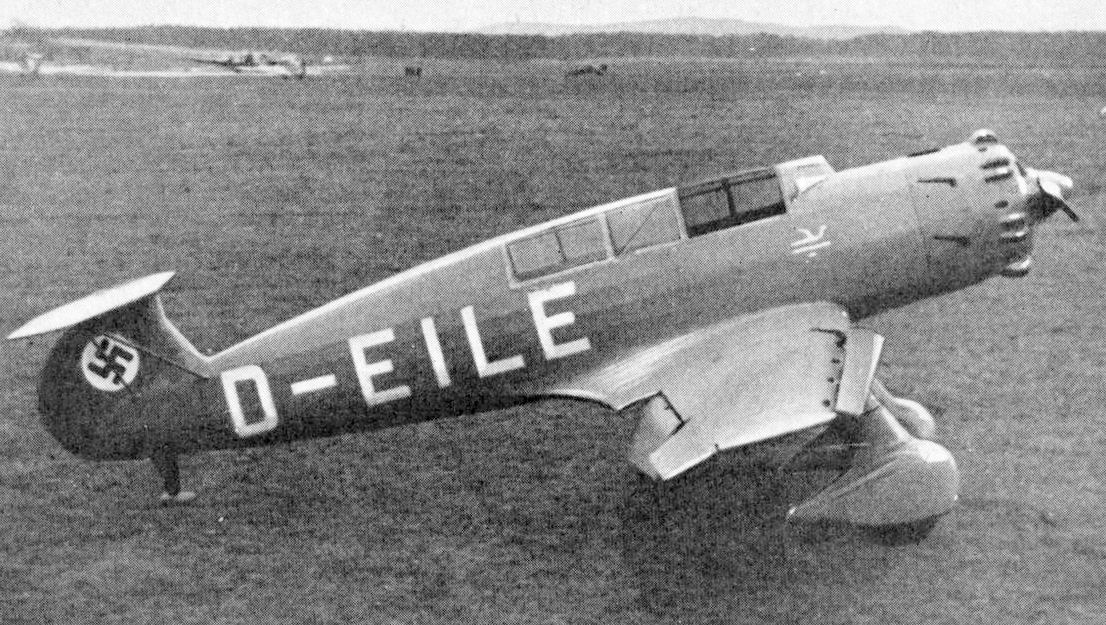

General information
- Type: Experimental cabin monoplane
- National origin: Germany
- Manufacturer: Akaflieg Darmstadt
- Number built: 1

History
- Manufactured: 1936
- First flight: 1936

The Darmstadt D-29 was a German experimental monoplane designed and built by Akaflieg Darmstadt (of the Darmstadt University of Technology). The D-29 was a cantilever low-wing monoplane designed and built during 1936 with a conventional landing gear with a tailskid. It was powered by a Siemens-Halske Sh 14a radial piston engine and had enclosed tandem cockpits, as well as a number of other features, including hydraulically actuated trailing-edge flaps, a braced T-tail and leading-edge slots.

== Specifications ==
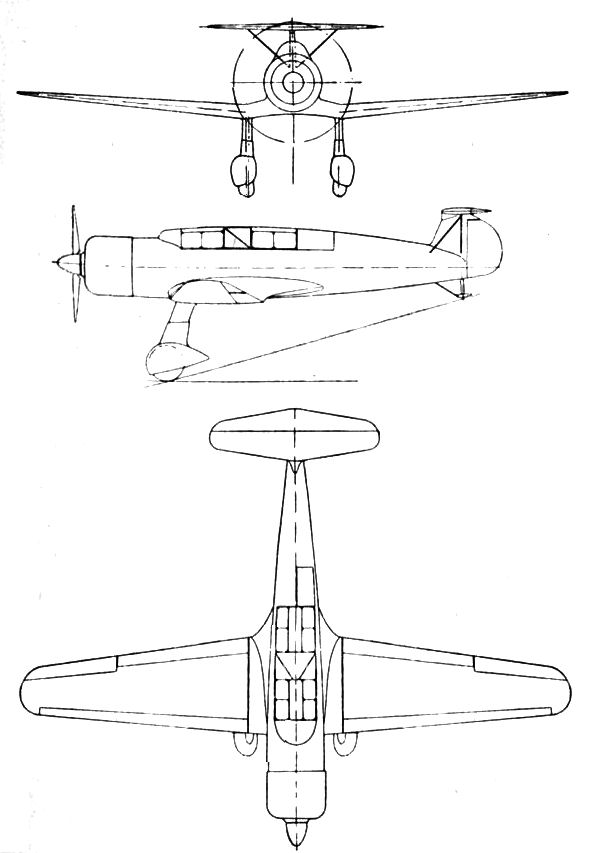
Akaflieg Darmstadt D-29 3-view drawing L'Aerophile September 1937

Data from Illustrated Encyclopedia of Aircraft

General characteristics

- Crew: 2
- Length: 7.10 m (23 ft 4 in)
- Wingspan: 8.80 m (28 ft 10 in)
- Height: 2.75 m (9 ft 0 in)
- Wing area: 10.00 m^{2} (107.6 sq ft)
- Empty weight: 560 kg (1,235 lb)
- Max takeoff weight: 850 kg (1,874 lb)
- Powerplant: 1 × Siemens-Halske Sh 14a radial piston engine, 110 kW (150 hp)

Performance

- Maximum speed: 245 km/h (152 mph, 132 kn)
- Range: 675 km (419 mi, 364 nmi)
