= Akaflieg Darmstadt D-30 Cirrus =

German single-seat glider, 1938

D-30 Cirrus

General information
- Type: Single seat high performance sailplane
- National origin: Germany
- Manufacturer: Akaflieg Darmstadt
- Designer: H. Alt and H. J. Puffert
- Number built: 1

History
- First flight: 1938

The Akaflieg Darmstadt D-30 Cirrus was an aerodynamically advanced single seat sailplane with a very high aspect ratio wing and a pod and boom fuselage. Built in Germany just before World War II, it was intended as a record breaker and duly set a new world out-and-return distance record in 1938.

== Design and development ==
The Akademische Fliegergruppe of the Technical University of Darmstadt (Akaflieg Darmstadt) was first formed in 1921. It was, and is, a group of aeronautical students who design and construct aircraft as part of their studies and with the help and encouragement of their University. Before the Cirrus their sailplanes designs, whilst often advanced, had all been constructed from wood and fabric. It was well known that high performance required large lift to drag ratios, and that these were obtained by using high aspect ratio wings. The 20 m (65 ft 7 in) span wings of the Cirrus had an aspect ratio of 33.6, the highest of any aircraft built at the time, and such slender structures could not be built entirely from wood. Instead, a single, wide, tapering duralumin spar was built up out of corrugated sheets, with upper and lower skins that formed about one third of each wing surface at the root and more at the tip. Ahead and aft of the spar the wing profile was shaped with wooden ribs and plywood skinned. It was straight tapered in plan, constructed from an inner 10 m (32 ft 10 in) centre section and two outer panels each 5 m (16 ft 5 in) long, with a high taper ratio of 4 and with squared off tips. Strongly tapered wings have a lift distribution which falls rapidly along the span, so the angle of incidence of the wings of the Cirrus initially increased along the span (wash-in), then decreased towards the tips (wash-out), producing a better approximation of the lift distribution to that of the aerodynamically ideal elliptical wing. The outer panels had ailerons along the whole of their trailing edges, and the inner section similarly carried flaps. The ailerons were of the differential type and were interconnected to the rudder to simplify yaw correction. Mid-chord spoilers were fitted on the centre section.

Apart from its span and aspect ratio, the wing had two other unusual features. A combination of the then new NACA profiles used gave the wing more camber at the tip. Since higher camber airfoils stall at greater angles of attack measured from the zero-lift line, the combination of higher camber and washout means that the stall develops inboard and that the ailerons, on the unstalled outer wing, retain lateral control and can prevent entry into a spin. This is now a standard sailplane design feature but was new in the 1930s. The other unusual and possibly unique wing feature was that the dihedral of the outer panels (there was none inboard) could be varied in flight though large angles (+8.5/-4.4). The intention was to investigate the effects of outer wing dihedral on handling.

The wing was set on top of the forward fuselage or pod, which ended just aft of the trailing edge. The pilot's seat was ahead of the leading edge, with a canopy that ran back into the wing. The canopy and part of the surrounding upper fuselage was removed for access. There was a shallow landing skid under most of the pod. Take-offs were made from a four-wheeled dolly, left behind after launch. A slender, light magnesium alloy (electron metal) tube ran aft from the top of the pod, carrying the empennage, which had ply covered fixed surfaces and fabric covered control surfaces. The horizontal surfaces, set forward of the fin were straight tapered with rounded tips; the fin, which extended above and below the boom carried a large, almost semi-circular rudder.

== Operational history ==
The Cirrus, flown by Bernard Flinsch, set a new world record out and return distance in 1938, flying 306 km (190 mi) from Bremen to Lübeck and back. Damaged in a launch accident, it was rebuilt with a revised pod and redesignated the D-30B. In June 1939 Flinsch flew it 406 km (252 mi).

The Cirrus did not survive World War II.

== Variants ==
D-30
Original version.
D-30b
Rebuilt after launch accident; improved pod shape.
D-31
Planned, unbuilt two seat version.

== Specifications (D-30B) ==
Data from Flugzeug-Typenbuch. Handbuch der deutschen Luftfahrt- und Zubehör-Industrie 1944

General characteristics

- Crew: 1
- Length: 6.62 m (21 ft 9 in)
- Wingspan: 20 m (65 ft 7 in) (Note: In Simons's 3-view, the span is incorrectly labelled as 42232 mm; as acknowledged in the Errata in Simons, Martin (2005). Sailplanes 1965-2000 (2nd revised ed.). Königswinter: EQIP Werbung & Verlag GmbH. p. 272. ISBN 3-9808838-1-7., it should be 20000 mm.)
- Height: 1.75 m (5 ft 9 in)
- Wing area: 12 m^{2} (130 sq ft)
- Length de-rigged: 10.05 m (33 ft)
- Width de-rigged (without tailplane): 1.8 m (5 ft 11 in)
- Width de-rigged (with tailplane): 1.8 m (5 ft 11 in)
- Height de-rigged: 1 m (3 ft 3 in)
- Aspect ratio: 33.4
- Airfoil: root: NACA 2412; tip:NACA 4412
- Empty weight: 175 kg (386 lb)
- Gross weight: 265 kg (584 lb)

Performance

- Never exceed speed: 300 km/h (190 mph, 160 kn)
- g limits: +8 (ultimate)
- Maximum glide ratio: 1:36 at 72 km/h (45 mph; 39 kn)
- Rate of sink: 0.52 m/s (102 ft/min) at 62 km/h (39 mph; 33 kn)
- Wing loading: 22.1 kg/m^{2} (4.5 lb/sq ft)
