= Akaflieg Darmstadt D-41 =

German two-seat glider, 1993

D-41

General information
- Type: Side-by-side configuration two seat sailplane
- National origin: Germany
- Manufacturer: Akaflieg Darmstadt
- Number built: 1

History
- First flight: 1993

The Akaflieg Darmstadt D-41 was a two-seat, side-by-side configuration sailplane designed to perform as well as tandem seaters. It was built in Germany in the 1990s and was used by Akaflieg Darmstadt students until it was lost in a crash.

== Design and development ==
The Akademische Fliegergruppe of the Technical University of Darmstadt (Akaflieg Darmstadt) was first formed in 1921. It was, and is, a group of aeronautical students who design and construct aircraft as part of their studies and with the help and encouragement of their University. The D-41 was completed in 1993. It was designed to show that a two-seat sailplane of side-by-side layout, with its better visibility for the instructor, who sits in the rear seat in a tandem configuration trainer, and easier instructor-pupil communication, could have as high performance as one with the more usual tandem seat arrangement.

The D-41 was constructed from mixed composite materials, using GRP, CRP and aramid reinforced polymer. It had a mid-set wing of straight double tapered plan with a continuous straight leading edge with almost no sweep. Flaps filled the whole of the trailing edge inboard of the ailerons. The forward fuselage and cockpit region was wider than that of a tandem seater but inclined seats kept the depth down, leading to a flattened oval cross section of not much greater area. The cockpit was covered with a long, single piece canopy reaching back to the wing leading edge. Behind the wing the fuselage became slender, ending in a T-tail with straight edged, tapered surfaces. The D-41 had a retractable central undercarriage. The side-by-side configuration requires cockpit ballast for solo flying and the D-41 also had provision for 200 kg (440 lb) of water ballast for competition flying.

== Operational history ==
The D-41 was used by the Akaflieg students and proved popular, but was lost in a fatal accident during an aborted launch. A spin developed which it was impossible to recover from before crashing, killing both pilots.

== Specifications ==
Data from Jane's All the World's Aircraft 1991/2

General characteristics

- Crew: 2
- Length: 8.30 m (27 ft 3 in)
- Wingspan: 20.00 m (65 ft 7 in)
- Height: 0.85 m (2 ft 9 in)
- Wing area: 14.00 m^{2} (150.7 sq ft)
- Aspect ratio: 28.6
- Airfoil: Wortmann AH-FX-81-K 130/17 root, Wortmann AH-FX-81-K 148/17 tip, as Rolladen-Schneider LS6
- Empty weight: 350 kg (772 lb)
- Gross weight: 760 kg (1,676 lb)

Performance
