= Libelle (microcar) =

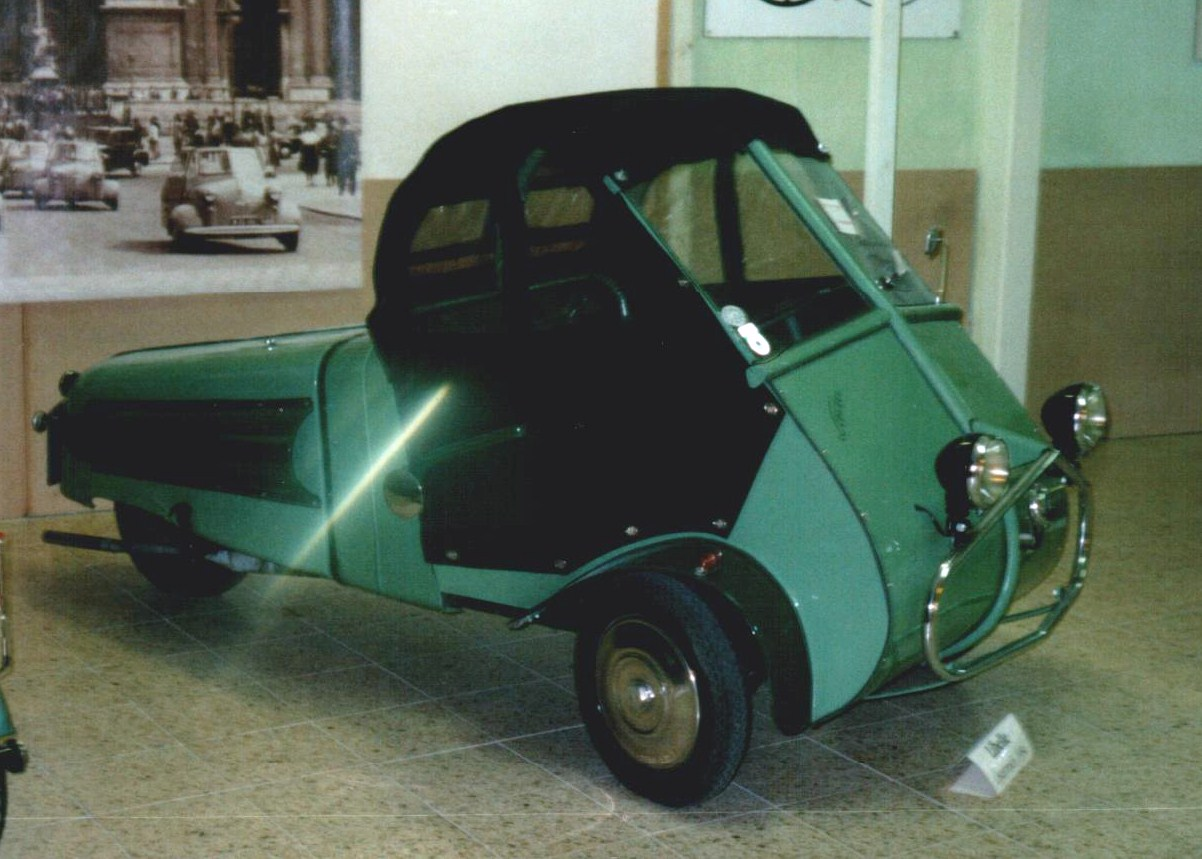
- 1954 Libelle

Overview
- Manufacturer: Libelle Fahrzeugbau- und Vertriebsgesellschaft
- Production: 1952 – 1954
- Assembly: Eggenburg, Austria

Body and chassis
- Class: Microcar

Powertrain
- Transmission: 4-speed

The Libelle was an Austrian three-wheeled microcar built in Innsbruck by Libelle Fahrzeugbau- und Vertriebsgesellschaft between 1952 and 1954. It had a one-cylinder two-stroke Rotax engine with 199 cc and 8.5 hp, and 4 gears.

About 50 are believed to have been built; the only known "survivor" is in the exposition of the RRR scooter museum in Eggenburg, Austria.

== See also ==
- List of microcars by country of origin

Walter Zeichner: Kleinwagen International, Motorbuch-Verlag. Stuttgart 1999. ISBN 978-3-613-01959-1
