= Fred Langhammer =

American businessman (born 1944)

Fred H. Langhammer
- Born: 13 January 1944 (age 82)
- Occupation: Manufacturer

Fred H. Langhammer (born January 13, 1944) is Chairman, Global Affairs, of The Estée Lauder Companies Inc., a manufacturer and marketer of cosmetics products.

Prior to being named Chairman, Global Affairs, Mr. Langhammer was chief executive officer of The Estée Lauder Companies Inc. from 2000 to 2004, President from 1995 to 2004 and chief operating officer from 1985 through 1999. Mr. Langhammer joined The Estée Lauder Companies in 1975 as President of its operations in Japan. In 1982, he was appointed Managing Director of its operations in Germany.

He is also a director of The Shinsei Bank Limited. Mr. Langhammer has been a Director of The Walt Disney Company since 2005. He also currently serves as the co-chair of the American Institute for Contemporary German Studies' Board of Trustees.

== Awards and honors ==
Recipient of The International Center in New York's Award of Excellence.
