= Laister LP-49 =

American glider

LP-46 and LP-49

General information
- Type: Glider
- National origin: United States
- Manufacturer: Laister Sailplanes
- Designer: Jack Laister
- Status: Production completed

History
- First flight: 1966

The Laister LP-46 and LP-49 are a family of American high-wing, single-seat, gliders that were designed by Jack Laister and produced by Laister Sailplanes both as kit aircraft and as certified complete aircraft.

== Design and development ==
The original model, the LP-46 was first flown in 1966, with the LP designating Laister Products. The LP-46 features a 44.5 ft (13.6 m) wingspan and the first LP-46 has fixed monowheel landing gear.

The LP-49 is an improved version of the LP-46, designed for the Standard Class with a 49.2 ft (15.0 m) wingspan. The LP-49 has a metal wing with a NACA 64(3)-618 laminar flow airfoil and all-metal tail surfaces. The control surfaces are all counter-weighted with internal weights. The fuselage is a semi-monocoque fiberglass design, mounting a shock-strut suspended retractable monowheel landing gear with an automatic swivelling and retractable tailwheel. The ailerons and dive brakes automatically hook up on aircraft assembly. Due to the fuselage construction the aircraft type certificate contains the restriction "All external portions of the fuselage exposed to sunlight must be painted white, except for a minimum amount of light shaded markings."

The LP-49 was static-tested to 12 g and is approved for aerobatics including loops, spins and wing-overs. The aircraft is often called The Forty-Niner.

== Operational history ==
In March 2011, there were two of the three LP-46s built registered with the Federal Aviation Administration in the US, all certified aircraft. Also in March 2011, there were 24 LP-49s registered. Of the registered LP-49s 17 are certified and seven are amateur-built.

== Variants ==
LP-46
Original version with a 44.5 ft (13.6 m) wingspan, first flown in 1966 and certified on 22 October 1971. Vne is 125 mph (201 km/h). Three built.
LP-49
Improved version for the FAI Standard Class, with a 49.2 ft (15.0 m) wingspan. Certified on 29 August 1968. Vne is 135 mph (217 km/h).

== Aircraft on display ==
- US Southwest Soaring Museum - LP-46

== Specifications (LP-49) ==
Data from Sailplane Directory, Soaring and FAA Type Certificate

General characteristics

- Crew: one
- Wingspan: 49 ft 3 in (15.0 m)
- Wing area: 143 sq ft (13.3 m^{2})
- Aspect ratio: 16.9
- Airfoil: NACA 64(3)-618
- Empty weight: 475 lb (215 kg)
- Gross weight: 700 lb (318 kg)

Performance

- Never exceed speed: 135 mph (217 km/h, 117 kn) rough and smooth air
- Maximum glide ratio: 33:1 at 56 mph (90 km/h)
- Rate of sink: 141 ft/min (0.72 m/s) at 49 mph (79 km/h)
- Wing loading: 5.25 lb/sq ft (25.6 kg/m^{2})

== See also ==
- List of gliders
