= LAK-16 =

General information
- Type: Single-seat primary glider
- National origin: Lithuania
- Manufacturer: Lietuviška aviacinė konstrukcija (Lithuanian Aero-Construction) (LAK)
- Designer: Gintaras Sabaliauskas and Kęstutis Leonavičius

History
- First flight: 6 September 1986

The LAK-16 is a single-seat, open-girder primary glider in the 1930s tradition but constructed with modern materials. It was produced in the 1980s in Lithuania.

== Design and development ==
The Lithuanian LAK-16 primary glider was designed by Gintaras Sabaliauskas and Kęstutis Leonavičius as a successor to the LAK-14 Strazdas. For its first flight, it was fitted with a LAK-14 wooden wing but on later examples the wood was replaced with more modern materials. The LAK-16 is a high braced wing monoplane, with a simple parallel chord. Its wing is unswept and fabric covered, with broadly curved tips; on early production models it had a glassfibre single spar, glassfibre leading edges and ribs. On the later LAK-16M the wing structure is metal and is strengthened as a result. There are lobate, fabric covered ailerons which project behind the trailing edges, mounted on inset hinges.

The LAK-16 has a flat open frame fuselage based on a pair tubes, steel at the front and aluminium aft. The upper tube is straight from the tail to the leading edge, after which it curves down to form the nose of the glider, joining the lower tube. This is initially parallel to the upper rear tube but turns upwards aft from below the wing, so the fuselage depth decreases towards the tail. The fuselage is divided into three bays by vertical cross members and further stiffened with three diagonal members. The wing is mounted on the upper tube and braced with a single strut on each side from about one third span to the lower tube. Bracing wires from the wing at the top of the struts run rearwards to the tail and forward to the nose to limit in-plane flexing of the fuselage. The tail, built around duralumin tube structures and fabric covered, is conventional with a straight tapered tailplane on top of the fuselage. Its separate elevators have a gap between them for rudder movement. The vertical tail is swept, with a rounded top; the rudder is broad and reaches down to the keel.

The single GRP seat and headrest is mounted on the lower beam, with the pilot entitirely exposed, apart from the screening provided by a small nose fairing. The LAK-16 lands on a pair of small wheels mounted on self-sprung, cantilever GRP legs, assisted by a self-centering tailwheel.

Transportation and storage is simplified by the mounting of the wing, which with bracing and aileron wires disconnected can be rotated through 90°.

== Operational history ==
The LAK-16, with its wooden wing, first flew on 6 September 1986 and production probably began in 1987. Production numbers are not known, though serial numbers suggest they may have reached several hundred. In 2010, seventeen remained on the Lithuanian civil register with another in Poland.

== Variants ==
LAK-16
Initial production aircraft with GRP wing structure.

LAK-16M
Later aircraft with metal framed wings.

== Specifications (LAK-16M) ==
Data from Jane's All the World's Aircraft 1990/1, p.650-1

General characteristics

- Crew: one
- Length: 5.38 m (17 ft 8 in)
- Wingspan: 9.66 m (31 ft 8 in)
- Wing area: 8.05 m^{2} (86.6 sq ft)
- Aspect ratio: 11.6
- Airfoil: BR-72
- Empty weight: 88 kg (194 lb)
- Max takeoff weight: 175 kg (386 lb)

Performance

- Stall speed: 48 km/h (30 mph, 26 kn)
- Never exceed speed: 96 km/h (60 mph, 52 kn) in smooth air
- g limits: +5.5/-2.75
- Maximum glide ratio: 12:1 at 54 km/h (34 mph; 29 kn)
- Rate of sink: 1.20 m/s (236 ft/min) minimum
