= Akaflieg Darmstadt D-6 Geheimrat =

German single-seat glider, 1922

D-6 Geheimrat

General information
- Type: Single seat glider
- National origin: Germany
- Manufacturer: Akaflieg Darmstadt
- Designer: L. Hoffmann and F. Nicolaus
- Number built: 1

History
- First flight: 1922

The Akaflieg Darmstadt D-6 Geheimrat, often shortened to Darmstadt D-6 Geheimrat, was an early competition glider with a single seat and high cantilever wing, designed and built by German University students in 1922.

== Development ==
The Akademische Fliegergruppe of the Technical University of Darmstadt was first formed in 1921. It was, and is, a group of aeronautical students who design and construct aircraft as part of their studies and with the help and encouragement of their University. One of the first of these students was the son of a Privy Councillor (Geheimrat) and the group's sixth design, the D-6, was named in his honour.

The Geheimrat was a wood-framed aircraft with a rectangular cross section, flat sided, plywood covered fuselage. In plan it tapered only slightly but the depth decreased rapidly towards the tail, making the fuselage behind the wing strongly wedge shaped. The wing was mounted on two extensions at the highest point, with an open, unscreened cockpit below its leading edge behind a more rounded nose. A pair short skids attached directly to the edges of the fuselage underside acted as the undercarriage, aided by a short tailskid at the rear.

The thick section wing was a cantilever structure with ply covering from the spar to the leading edge and fabric covered aft. The centre section, about half the total span, was straight edged and with a constant 1.41 m (4 ft 8 in) chord. The outer panels were straight tapered, mostly on the trailing edge which carried the roll control surfaces. Unusually, the pilot did not alter pitch with elevators but by varying the angle of incidence in flight. The contemporary Harth-Messerschmitt S.10 glider used the same method. As a result, the fabric covered, rectangular tailplane, mounted by its leading edge at the extreme tail, was without elevators. The similarly covered fin and rudder together almost formed a square, its trailing edge over the tailplane's front spar.

== Operational history ==
The D-6 Geheimrat first flew in 1922 and competed in the Rhön (Wasserkuppe) glider meeting that August. It gained second place in the sink rate section, though overall a contemporary observer judged the earlier Darmstadt D-4 Edith, a braced monoplane, more successful. Having seen the Akaflieg Hannover Vampyr slope soaring for up to three hours, the Darmstadt students were soon making similar long flights in both their aircraft.

== Specifications ==
Data from Sailplanes 1920-1945

General characteristics

- Crew: 1
- Length: 5.50 m (18 ft 1 in)
- Wingspan: 12.10 m (39 ft 8 in)
- Wing area: 14.8 m^{2} (159 sq ft)
- Aspect ratio: 9.9
- Airfoil: Göttingen 387
- Empty weight: 98 kg (216 lb) structure
- Gross weight: 175 kg (386 lb) in flight

Performance

- Wing loading: 11.8 kg/m^{2} (2.4 lb/sq ft)
