= Lommatzsch Lom-61 Favorit =

Single seat glider designed in East Germany in the 1960s

Lom-61 Favorit
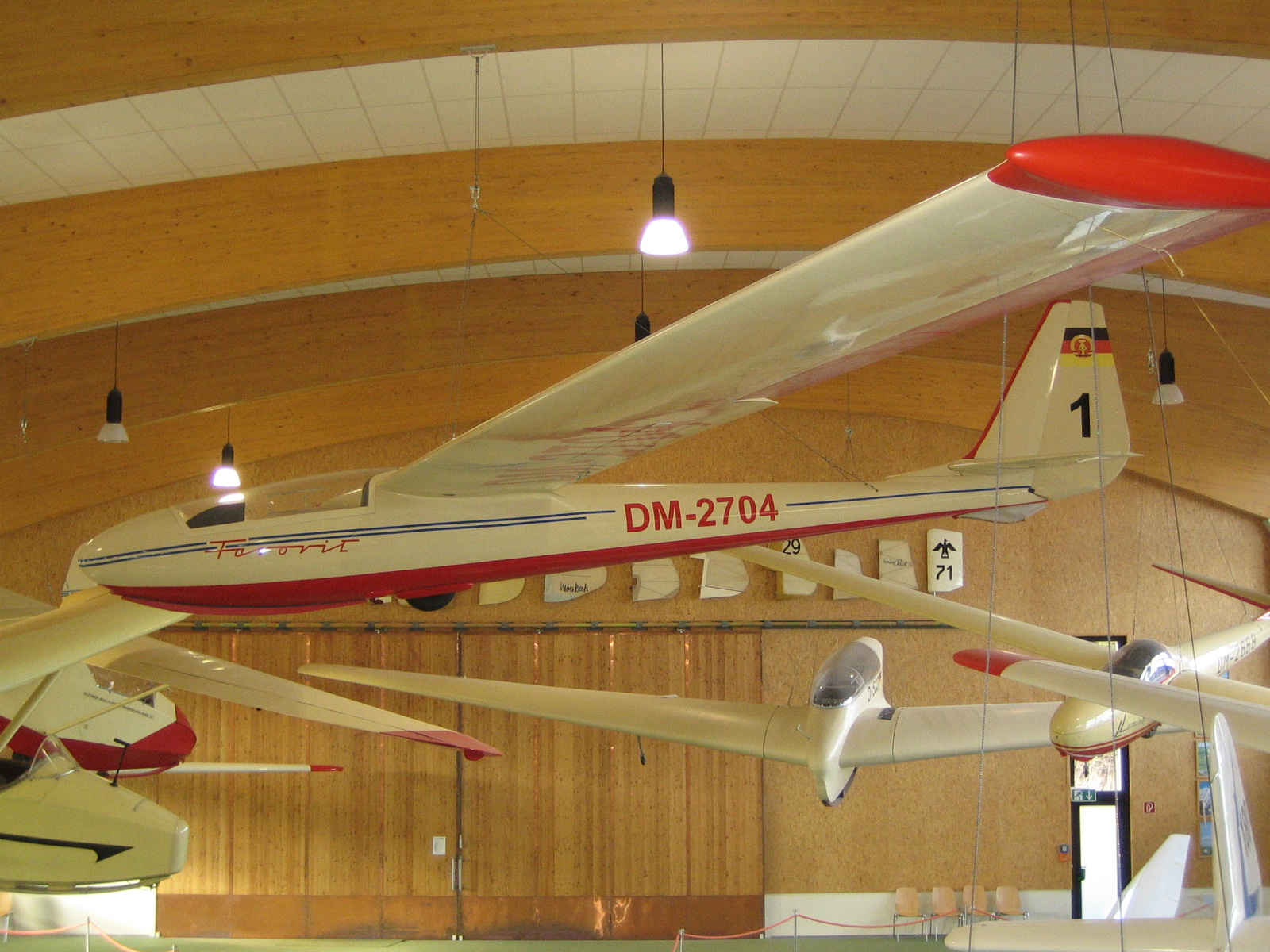

General information
- Type: High performance single seat glider
- National origin: German Democratic Republic
- Manufacturer: VEB Apparatebau Lommatzsch
- Designer: Hans Wegerich, Hans Hartung and Wolfgang Heintze
- Number built: 5

History
- First flight: c.1961

The Lommatzsch Lom-61 Favorit is a single-seat, high-performance glider. It was designed and built in East Germany in the early 1960s. Only five were built, mostly used by aviation clubs. One surviving unit, the DM-2704, is on display at the German Sailplane Museum in Wasserkuppe.

== History ==
=== Design and development ===
The Lommatzsch factory of the Volkseigener Betrieb Flugzeug (Association of the People's Aircraft Enterprises) was responsible for glider design and production in the DDR. The Lom-61 was principally designed by Hans Wegerich, Hans Hartung, and Wolfgang Heintze.

The Favorit has a high wing with a 6-series NACA laminar flow airfoil, straight tapered in plan. This was built in two pieces around a single spar at 40% chord with a pine and honeycomb supported plywood skin, linked by a central section integrated with the fuselage. Schempp-Hirth airbrakes are mounted further aft than usual, at 70% chord. The ailerons are gapless and split into pairs on either side.

The wooden fuselage of the Favorit is slender, with a maximum cross-section of 0.38 square metres (4.1 sq ft) that tapers gently to the rear. Tail surfaces are straight and tapered, with a sweep on the fin but none on the rudder, which extends to the keel. Horizontal surfaces are mounted on top of the fuselage, forward enough for the rudder hinge to be ahead of the elevator trailing edge. Forward of the wing, the cockpit is under a long, low, single-piece canopy. The Favorit lands on a fixed monowheel, partially enclosed in the fuselage, rubber sprung and fitted with brakes, assisted by a rubber sprung nose skid.

The Lom-61 first flew, as its name suggests, around 1961. Proposed variants for 1962-4 were not built.

=== Operational history ===
Only five Favorits were built, flying competitively in the DDR until 1980. One set a national record of 107 km/h (67 mph) over a 100 k (62 mi) triangle; another was the first to fly a German 50 km (310 mi) triangle.

== Specifications ==
Data from Segelflugzeuge

General characteristics

- Crew: One
- Length: 6.74 m (22 ft 1 in)
- Wingspan: 15.00 m (49 ft 3 in)
- Height: 2.00 m (6 ft 7 in)
- Wing area: 12.40 m^{2} (133.5 sq ft)
- Aspect ratio: 18.15
- Airfoil: NACA 65_{2}-615.5
- Empty weight: 225 kg (496 lb)
- Gross weight: 335 kg (739 lb)

Performance

- Maximum speed: 20 km/h (12 mph, 11 kn)
- Maximum glide ratio: 38:1 at 95 km/h (59 mph; 51 kn)
- Rate of sink: 0.60 m/s (118 ft/min) minimum, at 76 km/h (47 mph; 41 kn)
- Wing loading: 27.0 kg/m^{2} (5.5 lb/sq ft)
- Landing speed: 70 km/h (44 mph; 38 kn)
