= Leonard LPT =

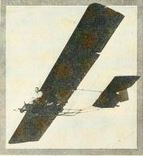
- LPT-2

General information
- Type: Two seat primary glider
- National origin: United States
- Manufacturer: Leonard Motorless Aircraft Co., Grand Rapids

History
- First flight: c.1930

The Leonard glider was an open frame primary glider, available in the standard single seat form or, unusually, as a two-seater. It was marketed in the U.S. in the early 1930s.

== Design and development ==
As gliding become both a popular sport and an introduction to powered flight in the 1920s and '30s, most learned to fly solo, on single seat, low cost, open frame (uncovered fuselage) gliders. The Pegasus was the father of the type, the Zögling the most imitated and the DFS SG 38 Schulgleiter the most numerous. The only instructions to the novices were shouted from the ground. The LPT-2 ((Leonard Primary Trainer, 2 seat) provided two seat training while retaining the low cost of the open frame design. It also reduced the complicated wire bracing required of the traditional flat girder fuselage by introducing a more rigid three longeron structure. The single seat LPT-1 offered a similar aircraft but more familiar training.

The two spar, fabric-covered wings were trapezoidal in plan. The tail surfaces were almost rectangular on plan and profile apart from the angled lower edges of the vertical tail. Its fuselage structure was different from that of the German designs, which had a short box girder carrying the pilot and a rear flat frame, stiffened laterally with wire bracing which needed re-tensioning after each flight. Instead, the LPTs had welded steel tube fuselages with two lower longerons and a single upper one connected by several four-strut pyramids, eliminating wire bracing.

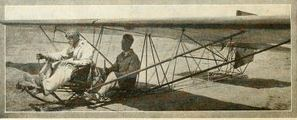
LPT-2

The gliders were flown from the front seat, ahead of the leading edge, and in the early stages of training the instructor, provided with dual control, sat over the centre of gravity under the wing, close enough to advise or correct the pupil's control input. Alternatively the rear seat could hold a passenger.

The glider was advertised in 1930 as the first production two seat training glider. It was certainly flying by early 1931 but its first flight date is not known, nor the numbers built.

== Variants ==
LPT-1
Single seat
LPT-2
Two seat

== Specifications (LPT-2) ==
Data from Aero Digest, March 1931

General characteristics

- Crew: Two, pilot and pupil
- Wingspan: 34 ft (10 m)
- Wing area: 170 sq ft (16 m^{2})
- Aspect ratio: 6.8
- Empty weight: 210 lb (95 kg)

Performance

- Maximum glide ratio: 1:15 in still air
- Landing speed: 19 mph (31 km/h; 17 kn)
