= Paul Laubenthal =

German aircraft pioneer (d. 1929)

Paul Laubenthal (born 1902 or 1903 in Cologne, died 8 June 1929 in Böblingen) was a German aircraft constructor and pilot.

== Life ==
Paul Laubenthal was born as the son of a ship builder in Cologne. He was the brother of painter Fritz Laubenthal.

Laubenthal was a pioneer of aircraft gliding in 1920s Germany, both as a pilot and as a constructor, most notably of the Laubenthal Württemberg and Lore single seat gliders. In 1928 Paul Laubenthal, along with fellow aviators Paul Röhre and Peter Hesselbach, was invited to the United States by the American Motorless Aviation Club. The objective of this extended visit was to introduce German gliding technology to the US and to help establish an American gliding school. During their stay, Hesselbach was able to set a new gliding record on July 29, staying in the air for 4 hours and 5 minutes.

On June 8, 1929 Laubenthal crashed his aircraft at a flight show in Böblingen, Germany, dying instantly due to severe skull fractures
