= LAK-15 =

General information
- Type: Open class sailplane
- National origin: USSR
- Manufacturer: Eksperimentine Sportines Aviacijos Gamykl (ESAG)
- Designer: J. Bankauskas
- Number built: 1

History
- First flight: 1989

The LAK-15, sometimes known as the LAK-15 Lietuve, was a high performance sailplane designed to set records. A one-off, it was built in the late 1980s in Lithuania, then a member of the USSR.

== Design and development ==
The LAK-15 was designed as a record breaking sailplane and so had a very large (25.6 m (84 ft 0 in)) span wing with an aspect ratio of 38.4. This was trapezoidal in plan, with 3° of dihedral. It was set at mid-fuselage, built around a single, carbon fibre spar and skinned with three-ply glass fibre/carbon fibre. There were high aspect ratio ailerons over at least half the span, with two flaps inboard. Each wing also had a spoiler and a tank for about 152 L (5.4 cu ft) of water ballast.

The oval section fuselage, built of composites, was deepest ahead of the wing with the pilot in semi-reclining position under a long single-piece canopy. Behind the wing the fuselage was very slender and ended with an integral, trapezoidal profile fin. The LAK-15 had a T-tail, with a trapezoidal-plan tailplane carrying rectangular elevators. The fin also carried a broad, rectangular profile rudder.

The LAK-15 landed on a retractable monowheel, equipped with a shock absorber and brake, and a fixed tailwheel.

== Operational history ==
The first flight was in 1989 and tests followed, but little more is known. No records were set and there is some evidence to suggest the performance was disappointing. Only one LAK-15 was built.

== Specifications ==
Data from j2mclPlaneurs except where noted

General characteristics

- Crew: one
- Length: 7.98 m (26 ft 2 in)
- Wingspan: 25.60 m (84 ft 0 in)
- Height: 2.19 m (7 ft 2 in)
- Wing area: 17.04 m^{2} (183.4 sq ft)
- Aspect ratio: 38.4
- Airfoil: E 662
- Empty weight: 375 kg (827 lb)
- Max takeoff weight: 750 kg (1,653 lb) with 305 L (10.8 cu ft) of water ballast

Performance

- Maximum glide ratio: 59 at 200 km/h (120 mph; 110 kn)
- Rate of sink: 0.4 m/s (79 ft/min) minimum
