= Akaflieg Darmstadt =

- Type: Non-profit
- Headquarters: Darmstadt, Germany
- Field: Aviation research
- Members: 53 (2010)
- Key people: Karl-Heinz "McHinz" Hinz – senior mastercraft
- Website: www.akaflieg.tu-darmstadt.de

Akaflieg Darmstadt is one of approximately twenty aviation groups attached to German universities. Akaflieg is an abbreviation for Akademische Fliegergruppe, an academic group of students and faculty from a German University.

== Akaflieg history ==
Otto Lilienthal published his book Der Vogelflug als Grundlage der Fliegekunst (Birdflight as the Basis of Aviation) in 1889, describing the basis of modern aerodynamics and aircraft construction. Lilienthal made many successful gliding flights from 1891 onwards. But the focus of attention shifted to powered flight after the Wright Brothers had demonstrated their Wright Flyer.

Gliding re-emerged as a sport after the war because the building of powered aircraft was restricted in Germany by the Treaty of Versailles. The main originator of the gliding movement was Oskar Ursinus, who in 1920 organised the first contest, known as the Rhön-Contest, on the Wasserkuppe. Held annually, students of technical universities brought gliders which they had developed and built themselves for testing at these contests, developing an esprit de corps known as Rhöngeist.

These informal beginnings stimulated the formation of groups of engineers at universities with the aim of scientific and practical education, with the first groups being formed, in 1920, at Aachen (Flugwissenschaftliche Vereinigung Aachen), Darmstadt (Akaflieg Darmstadt) and Berlin-Charlottenburg (Akaflieg Berlin), but others soon followed. Many of the first members had been pilots in the Luftstreitkräfte (Imperial German Air Service), but it was the love of flying rather than militarism or nationalism that motivated them, resulting in a fraternal spirit that has been maintained to this day.

During the Nazi period some Akafliegs retained their autonomy through the patronage of the Deutsche Versuchsanstalt für Luftfahrt (DVL), a forerunner of the present-day German Aerospace Center (DLR). However, shortly before World War II the akafliegs were forced to integrate into the NS-Deutsche Studentenbund (Nazi-students-federation), with the Akaflieg projects having mostly military applications.

== Present day ==
After the war, the Akafliegs re-formed in 1951, co-ordinated by Interessengemeinschaft Deutscher Akademischer Fliegergruppen e.V. (Idaflieg – interest group for German academic flying groups), with ten groups formed by 2009.

The aim of the Akafliegs is scientific research into flight development, as well as design and construction of aeroplanes, especially gliders. Much of the practical work is done at the summer meetings of the 'Idaflieg' in co-operation with the German Aerospace Center (DLR), while the results of the research are presented at the winter meetings. The 'Idaflieg' also offers many events and courses to its members such as the specification, design and certification of aeroplanes.

The quality of additional education provided by the Akafliegs is widely respected and so German glider manufacturers recruit almost exclusively from the Akafliegs. Once accepted as a member, students have to devote approximately 150 to 300-man-hours annually in the workshops to qualify for membership of the Akaflieg clubs, where the cost of flying is usually much lower than at other gliding/flying clubs.

American Universities have also implemented programs similar to the Akafliegs but based around the American style of teaching, Pennsylvania State University's AERSP 404H is one example of this implementation.

=== Akaflieg Darmstadt ===
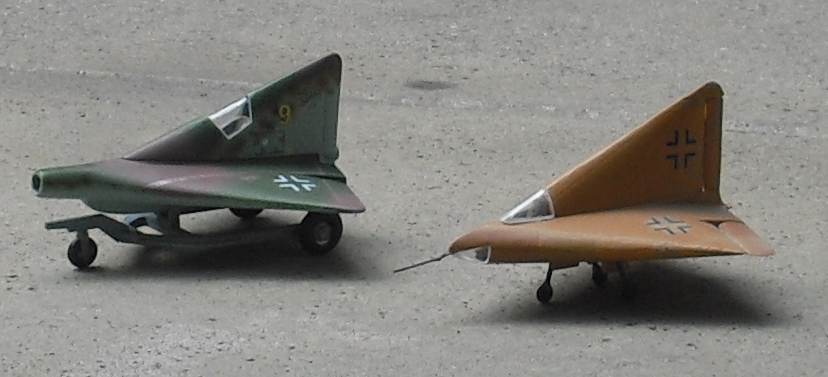
Model Photo Lippisch DM-1 and P13a

The Akademische Fliegergruppe Darmstadt e.V. (Academic Aviator Group Darmstadt) is a group of students enrolled at Darmstadt University of Technology, who are involved with the development and the design of gliders, as well as research in aerodynamics. Since the group was formed in 1920 over forty in-house designs have been created, with the D-43 trainer and Soteira pilot escape system being the latest.

During research for and testing of new designs at Akaflieg Darmstadt the students get the opportunity to fly gliders in the Akaflieg fleet for recreation, as well as partake in the research flying programmes. Active members spend much of their free time in the workshop working towards reaching their academic goals.

== Aircraft ==
data from:

Akaflieg Darmstadt D-1. Designed by Eugen von Lössl. First flight 1920. Construction: Wood, Wire and Fabric. Span 12.2 m (40 ft), Wing area 24.5 m2 (264 sq ft), Empty wt. 70 kg (150 lb) No. of seats 1. 1 built.
Single-seat Hang glider with a parasol monoplane wing and rectangular section aerofoil profiled fuselage. Bequeathed, unfinished, by Eugen von Lössl after his death on 9 August 1920 to Akaflieg Darmstadt, where it was completed. Flew in the 1921 and 1922 Rhön competitions. Originally intended for centre of gravity style control, wing warping was added after much discussion.

Akaflieg Darmstadt D-2 Pumpelmeise. Designed by E. Schatzki and F. Hoppe. First flight 1920. Construction: Wood, Wire and Fabric. Span 11 m (36 ft 1 in), Wing area 24.5 m2 (264 sq ft), Empty wt. 43 kg (95 lb) No. of seats 1. 1 built.
Cantilever monoplane hang-glider with undercarriage skids, intended for the 1921 Rhön competitions but not flown there. The pilot was supported at the extreme nose of the fuselage which terminated at the wing leading edge.

Akaflieg Darmstadt D-3 Nolleputzchen. Designed by F. Nicolaus. First flight 1921. Construction: Wood, Plywood and Fabric. Aerofoil: Göttingen 441 10 m (32 ft 10 in), Wing area 16 m2 (170 sq ft), Empty wt. 43 kg (95 lb) No. of seats 1. 1 built.
This shoulder-winged cantilever monoplane had a conventional cockpit forward of the wing centre section and dual main skids. Constructed from wood with fabric and plywood covering, the D-3 had moderately tapered trapezoidal wings attached to a square section fuselage that tapered to nose and tail from the wing attachments.

Akaflieg Darmstadt D-4 Edith. Designed by E. Thomas. First flight 1922. Construction: Wood, Plywood and Fabric. Aerofoil: Göttingen 426 12.6 m (41 ft 4 in), Wing area 18.8 m2 (202 sq ft), Empty wt. 110 kg (240 lb) No. of seats 1. 1 built.
This single-seat strut braced parasol glider was used for training and is the direct precedent of the "Bremen". RRG Prüfling, RRG Falke and Grunau Baby

Akaflieg Darmstadt D-5 Flohschwanz. Designed by A.Botsch and W. Hübner. First flight 1922. Construction: Wood, Wire and Fabric 7.5 m (24 ft 7 in), Wing area 18 m2 (190 sq ft), Empty wt. 45 kg (99 lb) No. of seats 1. 1 built.
This ultralight biplane glider was originally planned as a hang-glider but was completed with a cockpit nacelle and twin main skids.

Akaflieg Darmstadt D-6 Geheimrat. Designed by L. Hoffmann and F. Nicolaus. First flight 1922. Construction: Wood, Plywood and Fabric 12.1 m (39 ft 8 in), Wing area 14.8 m2 (159 sq ft), Empty wt. 98 kg (216 lb) No. of seats 1. 1 built.
This cantilevered monoplane glider employed an innovative control system, with pitch controlled through altering the angle of attack of the mainplane. Roll was achieved through altering the area of the wingtips, the after portions of which hinged at the inner front corner, sliding in and out of the forward portion of the wingtips, to alter area and thus lift, raising or lowering the wingtips.

Akaflieg Darmstadt D-7 Margarete. Designed by E. Schatzki, R. Kercher and F. Hoppe. First flight 1923. Construction: Wood, Plywood and Fabric. Aerofoil: root Göttingen 533, tip symmetrical 15.3 m (50 ft 2 in), Wing area 22.5 m2 (242 sq ft), Empty wt. 200 kg (440 lb) No. of seats 2. 1 built.
One of the first practical two-seaters, with a strut-braced high wing, and structure built from wood and fabric.

Akaflieg Darmstadt D-8 Karl der Grosse. Designed by K. Plauth. First flight 1923. Construction: Wood, Plywood and Fabric. Powered by 1 x 22 kW (30 hp). Aerofoil: Göttingen 426 14 m (45 ft 11 in), Wing area 17.9 m2 (193 sq ft), Empty wt. 270 kg (600 lb) No. of seats 2. 1 built.
A two-seat motorglider with a strut braced high wing, tandem cockpits under the wing centre section, tractor engine installation in the fuselage nose and twin mainwheels either side of the fuselage.

Akaflieg Darmstadt D-9 Konsul. Designed by A. Botsch, R. Spies and F. Hoppe. First flight 1923. Construction: Wood, Plywood and Fabric. Aerofoil: Root Göttingen 535, Tip Symmetrical 18.2 m (59 ft 9 in), Wing area 21 m2 (230 sq ft), Empty wt. 200 kg (440 lb) No. of seats 1. built.
This single-seat cantilever high winged glider illustrated the incremental progress in aerodynamic knowledge and construction techniques, using rounded sections and smooth skinning to reduce drag and improve performance. Weight reduction was also achieved by using a single main-skid, in what was to become the norm through to the 1940s when single wheeled undercarriages became the norm. The most impressive performance gain would have come from the (relatively) high aspect ratio long span wings, which at 18.2m were among the biggest up to that time. "The best glider of his time, which showed all the characteristics of today's gliders" (Brütting, 1972).

Akaflieg Darmstadt D-10 Hessen. Designed by A. Botsch, R. Spies and G. Loew. First flight 1923. Construction: Wood, Plywood and Fabric. Aerofoil: Göttingen 429, Göttingen 430, Göttingen 431 or Göttingen 432 11.1 m (36 ft 5 in), Wing area 13.2 m2 (142 sq ft), Empty wt. 76 kg (168 lb) No. of seats 1. 1 built.
Built purely as a flying wind tunnel with a simple rhomboidal section fuselage sitting on a single main skid. The section of the D-10 wings could be altered in flight, but results were never satisfactory, not least due to high friction in the variable section control system.

Akaflieg Darmstadt D-11 Mohamed. Designed by D. v. Massenbach and F. Hoppe. First flight 1924. Construction: Wood, Plywood and Fabric. Powered by 1x 20 hp (15 kW)Blackburne Tomtit with metal propeller. Aerofoil: Joukowski 10.74 m (35 ft 3 in), Wing area 12 m2 (130 sq ft), Empty wt. 170 kg (370 lb) No. of seats 1. 1 built.
"A cantilever low-winged ultralight aircraft with narrow track trousered fixed undercarriage, smooth plywood skinned fuselage and an all flying tailplane for pitch control. The D-11 Mohamed generated some interest when taking part in the 1924 Rhön-Leichtflugzeug-Wettbewerb (1924 Rhön light aircraft competition). "

Akaflieg Darmstadt D-12 Roemryke Berge. Designed by E. Schatzki. First flight 1924. Construction: Wood, Plywood and Fabric 16 m (52 ft 6 in), Wing area 17.5 m2 (188 sq ft), Empty wt. 144 kg (317 lb) No. of seats 1. 1 built.
The D-12 was built as a medium performance glider using the new construction techniques to minimise drag. Full span flaps and ailerons were also used as well as all-flying horizontal and vertical tails. Nehring completed the first successful out and return with this aircraft in 1926, flying from Darmstadt to Misleburg and back.

Akaflieg Darmstadt D-13 Mohamed II. Designed by P. Laubenthal and G. Riedenbach. First flight 1926. Powered by 22 kW (30 hp) Blackburne Thrush. Aerofoil: Joukowski 10.7 m (35 ft 1 in), Wing area 12 m2 (130 sq ft), Empty wt. 170 kg (370 lb) No. of seats 1. 1 built.
This single-seat lightweight aircraft, powered by a Blackburne engine, was intended for aerobatics, but with no improvement over the D-11 Mohamed plans for a small production run were abandoned.

Akaflieg Darmstadt D-14. Designed by H. Koch and R. Preuschen. First flight 1927. Powered by 30 kW (40 hp) ABC Scorpion, MkII. Aerofoil: Joukowski, Lachmann 9 m (29 ft 6 in), Wing area 14 m2 (150 sq ft), Empty wt. 220 kg (490 lb) No. of seats 2. 1 built.
This two-seat low-wing monoplane won 1st prize in the Idaflieg and Röhn-Rossitten-Gesellschaft construction competitions.

Akaflieg Darmstadt D-15 Westpreussen. Designed by H.Hofmann. First flight 1926. Aerofoil: Göttingen 535 and/or Göttingen 430/Göttingen431 14.5 m (47 ft 7 in), Wing area 16 m2 (170 sq ft), Empty wt. 120 kg (260 lb) No. of seats 1. 1 built.
Built following the "Darmstadt School", of cantilevered high wing with streamlined fuselage sections. The D-15 was designed and built for Ferdinand Schulz, who broke all the contemporary World glidings records whilst flying it.

Akaflieg Darmstadt D-16. Designed by F. Fecher and F. Ritz. First flight 1927. Construction: Wood, plywood and fabric. Powered by 30 kW (40 hp) ABC Scorpion, MkII 7.8 m (25 ft 7 in), Wing area 16.2 m2 (174 sq ft), Empty wt. 210 kg (460 lb) No. of seats 2. 1 built.
Developed from the 1st prize winning D-14, the D-16 was itself the precursor of the D-18.

Akaflieg Darmstadt D-17 Darmstadt. Designed by H. Volker. First flight 1927. Construction: Wood, plywood and fabric. Aerofoil: Göttingen 535 16 m (52 ft 6 in), Wing area 16.6 m2 (179 sq ft), Empty wt. 155 kg (342 lb) No. of seats 1. 1 built.
Built in the Darmstadt school fashion, the D-17 introduced automatic connection for the ailerons when rigging the glider. The D-17 was later taken to the United States (US) for an expedition in 1928. Hesselbach had a bad take-off, damaging the glider. The remnants were sold to Horace Wild, who hired Jack O'Meara to restore the glider. Wild renamed it "Chanute". In the next few years O'Meara gained many competition victories and broke many US gliding records.

Akaflieg Darmstadt D-18. Designed by Dipl.Ing. F. Fecher. First flight 1929. Construction: Wood, plywood and fabric. Powered by 1x65.6 kW (88.0 hp) Armstrong-Siddeley Genet / 1x 78.3 kW (105.0 hp) Armstrong-Siddeley Genet Major. Aerofoil: Joukowski 7.2 m (23 ft 7 in), Wing area 12.1 m2 (130 sq ft), Empty wt. 320 kg (710 lb) / 374 kg (825 lb) No. of seats 1 or 2. 1 built.
Built on experience with the D-14 and D-16, the D-18 was a cantilevered, (with the exception of cabane struts for the upper mainplane), heavily staggered biplane with clean lines, built from wood and plywood and covered with fabric. After the first few promising flights at the Darmstadt airfield the D-18 was transferred to the DLV (Deutsche Versuchsanstalt für Luftfahrt—German research establishment for flying) at Berlin. The D-18 then took part in the 1929 Europa-Rundflug, giving excellent results until a crash forced withdrawal. After repairs and the fitting of a Genet Major engine the D-18 went on to set three world records in 1930. For the 1930 Europa-Rundflug the D-18 was fitted with an enclosed canopy, but engine problems forced Rudolf Neininger, the pilot, to ditch in the Mediterranean Sea.

Akaflieg Darmstadt D-19 Darmstadt II. Designed by Franz R. Gross. First flight 1928. Construction: Wood, plywood and fabric. Aerofoil: Joukowski 15% to Joukowski 8%, root to tip 18 m (59 ft), Wing area 16.9 m2 (182 sq ft), Empty wt. 162 kg (357 lb) No. of seats 1. 1 built.
The D-19 utilised elliptical wings with ailerons on the outer sections, mounted on a pylon aft of the cockpit and a tail section similar to the D-17. In 1929, Franz Gross emigrated from Germany to Akron, Ohio. His many glider design accomplishments earned him a place in The National Soaring Museum (Elmira, New York). He died in Bath, Ohio, July, 1997.

Akaflieg Darmstadt D-20 Starkenburg. Designed by H. Hoffmann. First flight 1929. Construction: Wood, plywood and fabric 16 m (52 ft 6 in), Wing area 17.5 m2 (188 sq ft), Empty wt. 145 kg (320 lb) No. of seats 1. 1 built.
The D-15 Westpreussen rebuilt and improved after its crash at "Würzburg", piloted by A. Endres. Rudder and aileron interconnection was fitted similar to the system used on the D-9.

Akaflieg Darmstadt D-21. Designed by F. Fecher. First flight 1930 7.9 m (25 ft 11 in), Wing area 13.9 m2 (150 sq ft), Empty wt. 540 kg (1,190 lb) No. of seats 1. 0 built.
A projected single-seat powered aircraft for aerobatics.

Akaflieg Darmstadt D-22. Designed by F. Fecher. First flight 1931. Construction: Wood, plywood and fabric. Powered by 1x 150 hp (110 kW) Argus As8R 7.4 m (24 ft 3 in), Wing area 13 m2 (140 sq ft), Empty wt. 345 kg (761 lb) No. of seats 2. 3 built.
An improved D-18 with a German engine, retaining the heavily staggered cantilever, open cockpit, biplane configuration. Three aircraft were built, of which the first was sold in England, crashing in January 1932. The second aircraft was delivered to the Reichsverkehrsministerium for evaluation and the third was retained at Akaflieg Darmstadt.

Akaflieg Darmstadt D-23. Designed by V. Caspar. First flight 1930. Powered by 1x 60 kW (80 hp). Aerofoil: NACA M12 6.5 m (21 ft 4 in), Wing area 10.8 m2 (116 sq ft), Empty wt. 305 kg (672 lb) No. of seats. 0 built.
The D-23 remained a project.

Akaflieg Darmstadt D-24. Designed by G.Horn. First flight 1930. Powered by 1x 80 kW (110 hp). Aerofoil: NACA M12 11.7 m (38 ft 5 in), Wing area 16.7 m2 (180 sq ft), Empty wt. 400 kg (880 lb) No. of seats 2. 0 built.
The D-23 high wing, cantilever monoplane, cabin two-seater remained a project.

Akaflieg Darmstadt D-28 Windspiel. Designed by R. Kosin, R. Schomerus. First flight (D-28a 1933) (D-28b1933). Construction: Wood, plywood and fabric. Aerofoil: Göttingen 535 12 m (39 ft 4 in), Wing area 11.4 m2 (123 sq ft), Empty wt. (D-28a 54 kg (119 lb)), (D-28b 72 kg (159 lb)) No. of seats 1. 2 built.
Built to realise all potential performance gains using available theory and construction techniques. The D-28a was very light for its size and required very careful ground handling to avoid damaging the structure. The relatively high performance achieved allowed the D-28a to break the world record cross-country flight at 240 km and a 140 km goal flight, from Darmstadt to Saarbrücken, on 8 March 1935. A second modified heavier aircraft was built as the D-28b.

Akaflieg Darmstadt D-29. Designed by H.J.Biedermann, H. Voigt. First flight 1937. Construction: Wood, plywood, steel tubing and fabric. Powered by 1x 119 kW (160 hp) Bramo Sh 14 A. Aerofoil: M6 12 m (39 ft 4 in), Wing area 11.4 m2 (123 sq ft), Empty wt. 560 kg (1,230 lb) No. of seats 2. 1 built.
The sole D-29, (D-EILE), was built as a flying test-bed for high-lift devices on the wings, with a fixed, spatted, undercarriage, two seats under a long greenhouse canopy and a T-tail. The T-tail was intended to alleviate down-wash effects from the wings and high-lift devices during measurements. Testing was carried out on slats following the G. V. Lachmann patent and split flaps.

Akaflieg Darmstadt D-30 Cirrus. Designed by R. Schomerus, H. Alt, H.J. Puffert. First flight 1938. Construction: Wood, plywood, Duralumin and Elektron. Aerofoil: NACA 24xx and Göttingen 600 laminar profiles 20.1 m (65 ft 11 in), Wing area 12 m2 (130 sq ft), Empty wt. 190 kg (420 lb) No. of seats 1. 1 built.
The D-30 was built for high performance as well as, reputedly, aerobatics and cloud flying. The long span, high aspect ratio wings with newly devised laminar flow sections, combined with new construction techniques and materials, such as Duralumin and Elektron, gave the D-30 the desired performance. The D-30 went on to break the world record out and return distance on 7 July 1938 with a flight from Lübeck to Bremen and return. First place was also awarded to the D-30 in the Students competitions.

Akaflieg Darmstadt D-31. Designed by H. Friedmann. First flight 1937. Aerofoil: NACA 4415 to NACA 4412 20 m (65 ft 7 in), Wing area 20 m2 (220 sq ft), Empty wt. 180 kg (400 lb) No. of seats 2. 0 built.
A projected two-seater similar to the D-30 Cirrus, with a pod and boom fuselage and wings of lower aspect ratio. The second cockpit was to have been under the wing centre-section accessed by a cartype door on the starboard side.

Akaflieg Darmstadt D-32. Designed by R. Nusslein and H. Zacher. First flight 1938. Construction: Wood and plywood. Powered by 1x 120 kW (160 hp). Aerofoil: NACA 2415 to NACA 2409 7.9 m (25 ft 11 in), Wing area 9 m2 (97 sq ft), Empty wt. 310 kg (680 lb) No. of seats 1. 0 built.
A project for an aerobatic aircraft.

Akaflieg Darmstadt D-33 a.k.a. Lippisch DM-1. Designed by Alexander Lippisch and W. Heinemann. First flight ca 1942. Construction: Wood and plywood. Aerofoil: Ringleb 15% thick elliptic and symmetric 6 m (19 ft 8 in), Wing area 19.9 m2 (214 sq ft), Empty wt. 375 kg (827 lb) No. of seats 1. 1 built.
Design was started by Lippisch to carry out aerodynamic research for his P.13a interceptor design, with detail design and construction passed to Heinemann at Darmstadt. Part way through the airframe was transferred to a combined team at Akaflieg München and renamed the DM-1. It was almost complete at the end of hostilities in 1945 and created a lot of interest. The team of engineers at Munich were ordered to complete the DM-1 which was then shipped to the US for wind tunnel testing. The DM-1 survives to this day at the National Air and Space Museum storage facility.

Akaflieg Darmstadt D-34a. Designed by W.Sarnes, H.J.Merklein. First flight 1955. Construction: Wood, plywood and foam. Aerofoil: NACA 644-621 12.65 m (41 ft 6 in), Wing area 8 m2 (86 sq ft), Empty wt. 128 kg (282 lb) No. of seats 1. 1 built.
Built as a study project for the design and construction of high-performance sail-planes, the first of the series used wooden structure with plywood skin bonded to foam inners which gave a very smooth surface finish. The genesis of the modern glider is evident in the large canopy over a semi-reclining seat, T-tail and slender rear fuselage. Despite being a research aircraft the D-34s had some success in competitions.

Akaflieg Darmstadt D-34b. Designed by G.Jacoby. First flight 1957. Construction: Wood, plywood and foam. Aerofoil: NACA 644-621 12.65 m (41 ft 6 in), Wing area 8 m2 (86 sq ft), Empty wt. 141 kg (311 lb) No. of seats 1. 1 built.
Similar to the D-34a but with a higher empty weight.

Akaflieg Darmstadt D-34c. Designed by M.Rade. First flight 1958. Construction: Wood, plywood, foam and steel tube. Aerofoil: NACA 644-621 12.65 m (41 ft 6 in), Wing area 8 m2 (86 sq ft), Empty wt. 145 kg (320 lb) No. of seats 1. 1 built.
The D-34c introduced welded steel tubing to high stress areas, such as the fuselage/wing intersection.

Akaflieg Darmstadt D-34d. Designed by A.Puck, K.Weise, H.Wurtinger. First flight 1961. Construction: Wood, plywood, glass-fibre reinforced plastic and paper honeycomb. Aerofoil: NACA 644-621 12.65 m (41 ft 6 in), Wing area 9.18 m2 (98.8 sq ft), Empty wt. 155 kg (342 lb) No. of seats 1. 1 built.
Construction techniques for glass-fibre and paper honeycomb sandwich were researched with the construction of the D-34d.

Akaflieg Darmstadt D-35. Designed by A.Puck, H.Wurtinger. First flight 1959. Construction: Glass-fibre reinforced plastic, paper honeycomb and steel tube 19 m (62 ft 4 in), Wing area 18.05 m2 (194.3 sq ft), Empty wt. 240 kg (530 lb) No. of seats 2. 0 built.
This large high performance, V-tailed, two-seater, project was cancelled because the individual parts were too big to be built in the available space.

Akaflieg Darmstadt D-36 Circe. First flight 1964. Construction: Glass-fibre reinforced plastic, Balsa wood. Aerofoil: Wortmann FX62-K-131, Wortmann FX 60-126 17.8 m (58 ft 5 in), Wing area 12.8 m2 (138 sq ft), Empty wt. 285 kg (628 lb) No. of seats 1. 2 built.
"The D-36 was designed to incorporate all the latest improvements in aerodynamics and construction techniques to produce a high performance glider better than its contemporaries. Competition successes included:- 1st place Open Class German National Championship 1964 2nd place Open Class Gliding World Cup 1965 3rd place pen Class German National Championship 1966".

Akaflieg Darmstadt D-37 Artemis. Designed by F.Sator (D-37a), W.Dirks (D-37b). First flight 1967. Construction: Glass-fibre reinforced plastic, plasticell foam. Powered by 1x retractable sustainer motor. Aerofoil: Wortmann FX 66-S-196, Wortmann FX 66-S-160 18 m (59 ft), Wing area 13 m2 (140 sq ft), Empty wt. 325 kg (717 lb) No. of seats 1. 1 built.
A high performance single seater, fitted with a retractable sustainer motor (incapable of take-off), the initial D-37a was modified to the D-37b.

Akaflieg Darmstadt D-38. Designed by W.Dirks. First flight 1972. Construction: Glass-fibre reinforced plastic, Balsa wood. Aerofoil: Wortmann FX 61-184, Wortmann FX 60-126 15 m (49 ft 3 in), Wing area 11 m2 (120 sq ft), Empty wt. 210 kg (460 lb) No. of seats 1. 1 built.
The D-38 was in effect the prototype of the DG-100, built by Glaser-Dirks. Built almost exclusively of GRP with Balsa wood filler the D-38 was a Standard class sailplane with 15m span wings no flaps, retractable undercarriage and provision for water ballast.

Akaflieg Darmstadt D-39. Designed by G. Neubauer, B.Hügel. First flight 1979. Construction: Glass-fibre reinforced plastic, Balsa wood. Powered by (D-39) 2x Sachs KM 914 Wankel rotary engines, (D-39 HKW/McHinz/D-39b) 1x 48.5 kW (65.0 hp) Limbach engines. Aerofoil: (D-39) 15 m (49 ft 3 in), (D-39b / McHinz) 17.5 m (57 ft 5 in), (D-39 HKW) 20m (65f 7in), Wing area 11 m2 (120 sq ft), Empty wt. 370 kg (820 lb) No. of seats 1. 2 built.
The D-39 was originally designed as a single-seat touring motor-glider with 15m wings and paired Sachs rotary engines driving a folding propeller. Unsatisfactory performance from the airframe and the engines led to the re-design and rebuild into the D-39b McHinz and the privately built D-39 HKW by Heinrich Konrad Weinerth, using 17.5m / 20m wings respectively, a Limbach engine, and Wölbklappenflügel – automatic flaps.

Akaflieg Darmstadt D-40. Designed by K.J.Heer, D.Teves. First flight 1981. Construction: Glasfibre-epoxy, Carbonfibre-epoxy, Aramid-epoxy, with Balsa, Conticell and Rohacell fillers.. Aerofoil: FX 67-VG170 – FX 60–126, root to tip 15 m (49 ft 3 in), Wing area 11.5 m2 (124 sq ft), Empty wt. 260 kg (570 lb) No. of seats 1. 1 built.
Designed and built to comply with Federation Aeronautique Internationale (FAI) 15m class rukes, the D-40 includes area-increasing flaps which extend rearwards, hinged at the outboard end of the inner trailing edge at about ¾ span, similar in fashion to a pocket knife.

Akaflieg Darmstadt D-41. Designed by. First flight 1993. Construction: Carbonfibre-Epoxy. Aerofoil: Wortmann FX 81-K-130/17, Wortmann FX 81-K-148/17modified 20m (65f 7in), Wing area 14 m2 (150 sq ft), Empty wt. 431 kg (950 lb) No. of seats 2 side by side. 1 built.
This two-seater, with side-by-side seating follows contemporaries like the Akaflieg Berlin B13 and Stemme S10 motor-gliders, but is a pure glider with no engine. The wing is derived from that of the Rolladen-Schneider LS-6, extended to 20m at the roots.

Akaflieg Darmstadt D-42. Designed by M.Schröder, J.Scholz, P.Erb. First flight 1996. Construction: Glassfibre-epoxy, Carbonfibre-epoxy. Aerofoil: Wortmann FX 82-L-168 Wortmann FX 82-L-145 18 m (59 ft), Wing area 13.2 m2 (142 sq ft), Empty wt. 340 kg (750 lb) No. of seats 1. 0 built.
A projected 18m solar-powered sailplane with retractable engine/propeller. The solar cell and battery combinations required were considered too expensive and further work was abandoned.

Akaflieg Darmstadt D-43.
The D-43 is an ongoing project for a two-seater trainer to replace the Schleicher ASK 13. The initial stages in progress include the definition of a specification and market analysis, with decisions on prototype production and further work dependent on the results of the market survey.

Akaflieg Darmstadt D-44 Soteira.
The D-44 is a proposed rocket-powered glider pilot escape system, under development. Full-scale tests with dummies from static cockpits have been carried out, and a production system is proposed for fitment to the nascent D-43 trainer.
