= Akaflieg Darmstadt D-9 Konsul =

German single-seat glider, 1923

D-9 Konsul
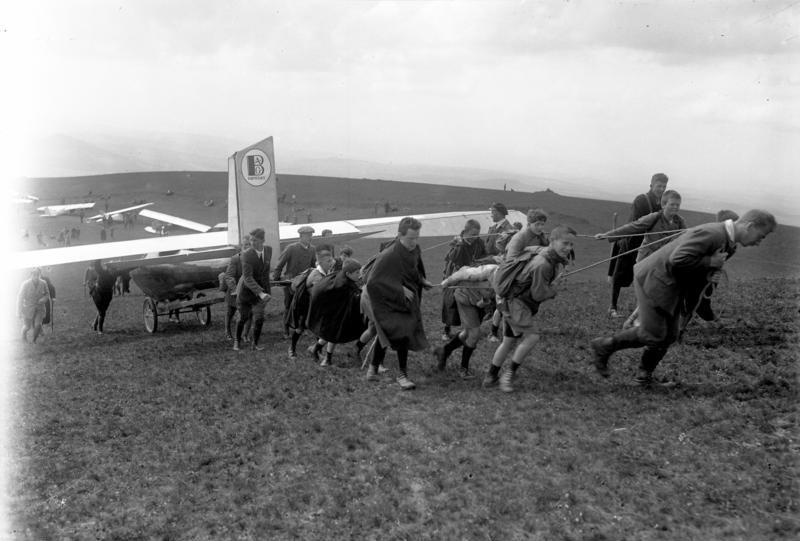

General information
- Type: Single seat glider
- National origin: Germany
- Manufacturer: Akaflieg Darmstadt
- Designer: Albert Botsch, Fritz Hoppe and Rudolf Spies
- Number built: 1

History
- First flight: 1923

The Akaflieg Darmstadt D-9 Konsul, often shortened to Darmstadt D-9 Konsul, was a high performance, single seat, cantilever monoplane sailplane, designed and built by a German University student group in 1923 for hill soaring.

== Development ==
The Akademische Fliegergruppe of the Technical University of Darmstadt was first formed in 1921. It was, and is, a group of aeronautical students who design and construct aircraft as part of their studies and with the help and encouragement of their University. The 1923 D-9 monoplane was named in honour of Karl Kotzenberg, sometime Consul General to Norway, who had provided financial support for the project. It was the most advanced glider of its day and had the highest aspect ratio (initially 16.66) of any existing aircraft.

The Konsul was a wood-framed aircraft with a high, cantilever, single spar wing with stressed 3-ply covering from the spar to the leading edge and fabric covered aft. It was built in three parts, an 8 m (26 ft 3 in) inner section with a box spar and outer panels with an I-section one. The wing had a thick and strongly cambered profile, using the then new Göttingen 535 airfoil with its high lift to drag ratio that attracted many pre-World War II sailplane designers. The long wings had constant chord except for tapered tips, where the wing decreased in thickness. There was no dihedral. Half span, large area ailerons had angled hinges attached to the spar at its tip and, in the early flight tests, projected well beyond the fixed wing tip. These proved both heavy in flight and vulnerable on the ground, so were soon tapered and rounded off, slightly reducing the span and aspect ratio. The ailerons operated differentially, upward deflections being smaller than downward ones; this was a relatively new way of reducing adverse yaw but in addition the rudder and ailerons were interconnected. Small rudder deflections did not affect the ailerons but larger ones moved them appropriately. No flaps, airbrakes or spoilers were fitted, normal for the time

The fuselage of the Konsul was a 3-ply skinned, oval cross sectioned semi-monocoque, with a blunt nose and slightly tapered and more rounded towards the tail. The open, unscreened cockpit was well ahead of the wing, which was mounted directly on top of the fuselage. A short undercarriage skid was attached to the fuselage underside via rubber blocks, aided by a small tailskid. The empennage was fabric covered, straight edged with angled tips; the fin and tailplane had narrower chord than the generous control surfaces and slight sweep on their leading edges. The rudder, which reached down to the bottom of the fuselage, moved within a cut-out in the elevators.

== Operational history ==
The D-9 Konsul first flew in 1923 and took part in both the 1923 and 1924 Rhön events. In 1923 the Konsul, flown by Albert Botsch, one of its designers, won the distance prize with a record breaking flight of 18.7 km (11.6 mi). In 1925 it won the distance prize again, piloted by Johannes Nehring. Nehring set another distance record that year with a flight of 24.4 km (15.2 mi) during a visit to the Crimea, hill soaring as before. The Konsul remained active until 1927 when it was destroyed in an accident.

== Specifications (after ailerons reduced) ==
Data from Sailplanes 1920-1945

General characteristics

- Crew: 1
- Length: 6.35 m (20 ft 10 in)
- Wingspan: 18.20 m (59 ft 9 in)
- Wing area: 21 m^{2} (230 sq ft)
- Aspect ratio: 15.8
- Airfoil: Göttingen 535
- Empty weight: 185 kg (408 lb) structure
- Gross weight: 270 kg (595 lb) in flight

Performance

- Maximum glide ratio: 1:24.4 at 53 km/h (33 mph)
- Wing loading: 9.1 kg/m^{2} (1.9 lb/sq ft)
