= LAK-14 =

LAK-14 Strazdas

General information
- Type: Primary glider
- National origin: Lithuania / occupied by USSR
- Manufacturer: ESAG (Eksperimentinė sportinės aviacijos gamykla) (Experimental Plant of Sports Aviation)
- Designer: Antanas Paknys

History
- First flight: 1981

The LAK-14 Strazdas (Thrush) was a 1980s primary glider designed and built by the Lithuanian Aircraft Construction factory. Like other LAK designs it developed the aeronautical use of glass fibre, foams and other novel materials. It was in production from 1981 to 1985.

== Design and development ==
The LAK-14 was designed at LAK by Antanas Paknis, one of the organization's original design team. It was intended to succeed the Oskinis BRO-11M, also known as the LAK-2. It was therefore in competition with the Oškinis BRO-23KR Garnys. It first flew in 1981.

The two Oškinis designs were simple, open frame fuselage primary gliders in the SG 38 Schulgleiter tradition. In contrast the Strazdas had an externally more conventional fuselage, though its construction was more advanced. One of LAK's founding goals was to develop the aeronautical use of plastics and composites, so the forward fuselage of the Strazdas, apart from a wooden nose fairing which held the launch towing hook, was built from three-ply glass fibre with foam filling. The pilot sat in a long, open cockpit with the seat back against a pedestal that supported the wing. This pedestal was part of the enclosed, round-sectioned rear fuselage structure which also included an integral fin. The tailplane, mounted high on the fuselage, had foam ribs and two-ply glass cloth skin.

The two part, rectangular plan wing of the Strazdas was mounted high on its pedestal with 5° of dihedral. It was built around single spars, each braced to the lower fuselage with a single strut. Early development aircraft had wooden spars and ribs with glass cloth covering. Slotted, broad chord ailerons filled the whole trailing edge.

== Operational history ==
Production began early in 1981. The first production aircraft had wooden spars but this was later replaced by integrated glass fibre reinforced polyester resin structures. Production continued until 1985, though numbers are not known.

== Specifications ==
Data from Jane's All the World's Aircraft 1984-85

General characteristics

- Crew: One
- Length: 5.25 m (17 ft 3 in)
- Wingspan: 7.34 m (24 ft 1 in)
- Height: 2.30 m (7 ft 7 in)
- Wing area: 10.60 m^{2} (114.1 sq ft)
- Aspect ratio: 5.1
- Airfoil: TsAGI R-P
- Empty weight: 100 kg (220 lb)
- Max takeoff weight: 185 kg (408 lb)

Performance

- Maximum speed: 100 km/h (62 mph, 54 kn) in rough or smooth air
- Stall speed: 45 km/h (28 mph, 24 kn)
- g limits: +4.0/-2.0
- Maximum glide ratio: 13 at 52 km/h (32 mph; 28 kn)
- Rate of sink: 1.10 m/s (217 ft/min) minimum, at 50 km/h (31 mph; 27 kn)
