= LAK-12 =

Lithuanian glider

General information
- Type: Open Class sailplane
- National origin: Lithuania
- Manufacturer: LAK; Sportine Aviacija; Sport Aviation USSR
- Status: Production completed
- Number built: 253

History
- First flight: 1986

The LAK-12 is a Lithuanian mid-wing, single-seat, FAI Open Class glider that was designed and produced by Lietuviškos Aviacinės Konstrukcijos (LAK) (English: Lithuanian Aircraft Builders) in Lithuania and later by Sportine Aviacija and Sport Aviation USSR.

== Design and development ==
The LAK-12 was designed in the 1980s as an open class racer.

The aircraft is made from fibreglass, foam and carbon fibre. Its 20.42 m (67.0 ft) span foam-core wing employs a Wortmann FX67-K-170 airfoil at the wing root, transitioning to a FX67- K-150 section at the wing tip. The wings feature both double-panel upper surface air brakes and flaps that can be set to -7°, -4°, 0°, +5°, +11° and +15°. Water ballast is 190 L (50 US gal) held in the wing leading edges and dumped through a centre-fuselage valve. The landing gear is a single retractable monowheel suspended by an oil/nitrogen oleo, plus a tailskid. The cockpit canopy is of one-piece and forward hinged.

== Operational history ==
According to Sportine Aviacija, the current type certificate holder, 253 were manufactured over a twenty-five year production run.

In April 2018 there were 17 LAK-12s listed on the United States Federal Aviation Administration registry, all single-place and certified in the Experimental - Racing/Exhibition category and three registered with Transport Canada in the Limited Class.

== Variants ==
LAK-12 Lietuva
20.42 m (67.0 ft) span open-class sailplane.
LAK-12 Lietuva 2R
Two-seat version of the LAK-12 with tandem cockpit in an extended fuselage.
LAK-12E
Experimental 25.5 m (83.7 ft) span variant built in 1988 and tested in 1988 and 1989, incorporating boundary control via blowholes on the lower surface. Only one produced.

== Aircraft on display ==
The sole LAK-12E currently hangs from the ceiling of the Lithuanian Aviation Museum in Kaunas.

== Specifications (LAK-12) ==
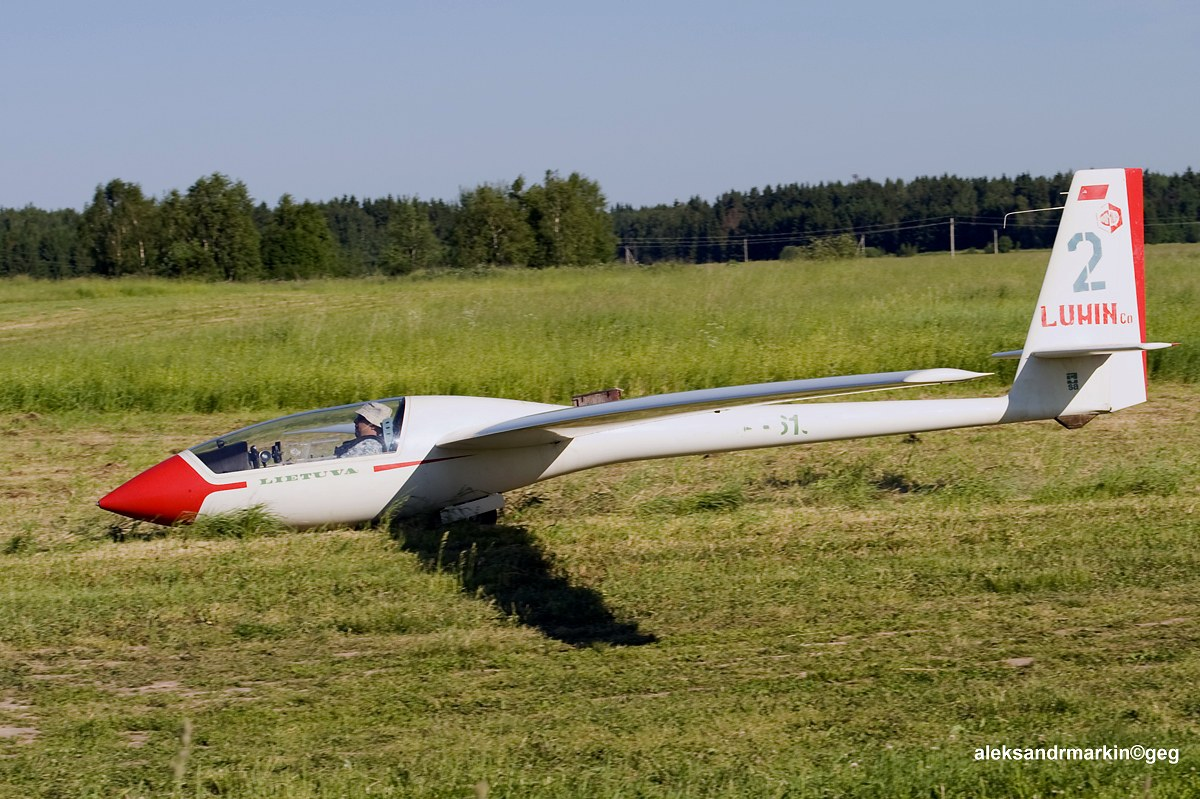
LAK-12

LAK-12

Data from Jane's All the World's Aircraft 1988-89

General characteristics

- Crew: one
- Length: 7.23 m (23 ft 9 in)
- Wingspan: 20.42 m (67 ft 0 in)
- Height: 1.92 m (6 ft 4 in)
- Wing area: 14.63 m^{2} (157.5 sq ft)
- Aspect ratio: 28.5:1
- Airfoil: Root: Wortmann FX67-K-170, tip: FX67- K-150
- Empty weight: 360 kg (794 lb)
- Max takeoff weight: 650 kg (1,433 lb) with ballast
- Water ballast: 190 L (50 US gal; 42 imp gal)

Performance

- Stall speed: 65 km/h (40 mph, 35 kn)
- Never exceed speed: 250 km/h (160 mph, 130 kn) in smooth air
- Max aero-tow speed: 140 km/h (76 kn; 87 mph)
- g limits: +6 -3
- Maximum glide ratio: 47:1
- Best glide speed: 95 km/h (51 kn; 59 mph)
- Rate of sink: 0.48 m/s (94 ft/min) *Minimum sink speed: 75 km/h (40 kn; 47 mph)
- Wing loading: 44.42 kg/m^{2} (9.10 lb/sq ft) max

== See also ==
Aircraft of comparable role, configuration, and era

- Schempp-Hirth Nimbus-2
- ASW-17

Related lists

- List of gliders
