= Oškinis BRO-11 =

BRO-11

General information
- Type: Primary glider
- National origin: USSR
- Designer: Bronius Oškinis
- Primary user: DOSAAF
- Number built: Over 2000

History
- First flight: 1954

The Oškinis BRO-11 was a primary glider designed in the USSR. It was produced in large numbers from the 1950s.

== Design and development ==
The Oškinis BRO-11 was a simple, single-seat primary glider in the open girder style exemplified by the pre-war SG 38 Schulgleiter. It was more refined, with slotted ailerons and somewhat better-protected seating.

Its high wing, mounted on top of the fuselage girder, was rectangular in plan and built around a single, wooden spar with plywood skin ahead of it, forming a torsion-resistant D-box, and fabric covering behind. The wing was braced to the bottom fuselage beam with a single strut on each side, assisted by drag wires from the nose. Narrow and very high aspect ratio ailerons were hung behind and below the whole trailing edge, leaving a slot between wing and aileron.

The wing of the original production model, named Pionier, Lithuanian for Pioneer (or Pionerius, the plural) had a span of 7.58 m (24 ft 10 in) and an area of 10.5 m^{2} (113 sq ft). The later Zylė (Tit), alternatively known as the LAK-2, had a slightly larger wing with a span of 7.80 m (25 ft 7 in) and an area of 11.8 m^{2} (127 sq ft), improving the glide ratio a little.

The forward part of the fuselage was a wooden beam which extended aft to end under the wing trailing edge. At the nose there was a simple, semi-circular enclosure formed from two single-curvature surfaces. This gave the pilot, seated just under the leading edge, some protection from the wind, though not for his upper body or sides. The same beam was attached to the wing with an N-form cross-member and also carried the forward end of the horizontal upper fuselage member. The rear lower member ran upwards to meet the upper one at the tail. In addition, they were interconnected at mid-fuselage by a pair of vertical and diagonal struts. Immediately ahead of the tail the fuselage was fabric covered, though not elsewhere.

Both variants had triangular tailplanes mounted on the upper frame with elevators which were rectangular in plan apart from a cut-out for rudder movement. Their little, triangular fins carried rather angular, quadrilateral rudders.

The fuselages of the Pionier and Zylė differed only in their landing gear. The Pionier landed on the underside of the forward beam but the Zylė had a monowheel semi-recessed into its beam below the forward wing and a short nose skid.

== Operational history ==
The BRO-11 Pionier was very widely used across the DOSAAF; some 2000 were built between about 1955 and 1960. The date of the first flight of the Zile is not known exactly but was about 1968. Production began in mid-1969 and ended in 1979. Production numbers for this variant are not known.

== Variants ==
BRO-11 Pionier(ius)
Original design, first flown in 1954 and some 2000 built in the later 1950s.

BRO-11M (LAK-2) Zylė
Larger wing and a landing wheel. Production by Lietuviškos Aviacinės Konstrukcijos (Lithuanian Aero-Construction, LAK) from 1969-79.

== Operators ==
- DOSAAF

== Aircraft on display ==
- BRO-11M Zylė: Lithuanian Aviation Museum, Kaunas, Lithuania

== Specifications (BRO-11M Zylė) ==
Data from Jane's All the World's Aircraft 1984-5

General characteristics

- Crew: One
- Length: 5.16 m (16 ft 11 in)
- Wingspan: 7.80 m (25 ft 7 in)
- Height: 2.50 m (8 ft 2 in)
- Wing area: 11.80 m^{2} (127.0 sq ft)
- Aspect ratio: 5.05
- Empty weight: 65 kg (143 lb)
- Max takeoff weight: 125 kg (276 lb)

Performance

- Stall speed: 31 km/h (19 mph, 17 kn)
- Maximum glide ratio: 12
- Rate of sink: 1.0 m/s (200 ft/min) minimum
