= US Southwest Soaring Museum =

- Established: 2006
- Location: Moriarty, New Mexico, United States
- Coordinates: 35.00464°N 106.025824°W
- Type: Aviation museum
- Collection size: Sailplanes
- President: George Applebay
- Website: Official website

The US Southwest Soaring Museum is an aviation museum, located at 918 E US Route 66, in Moriarty, New Mexico, United States that focuses on the history of gliding in the western United States. The museum is an affiliate member of the Soaring Society of America.

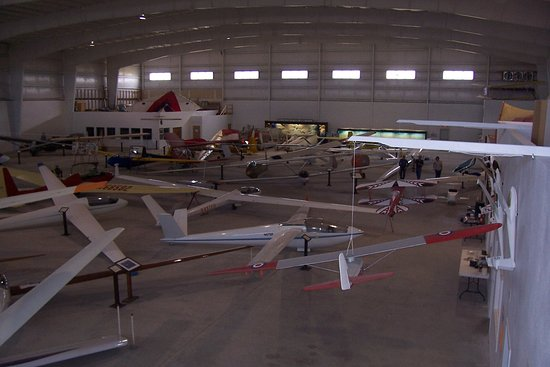
Inside the Museum

== Mission ==
The museum has the following aims: preserving and presenting the history and legacy of soaring; promoting an increased understanding of mathematics and the physical sciences through educational exhibits and programs; sponsoring aeronautical research programs relating to solar-powered flight; communicating an inspirational story of innovation and discovery for the New Mexico schoolchildren, the citizens of NM and visitors passing through the state and motivating others to experience the wonder of flight

== History ==
The museum was conceived in 1995 and opened in 1996 at the Moriarty, New Mexico airport. In 2006 the museum moved to its current location of 918 Historic US Route 66 East in Moriarty, New Mexico. Founding president George Applebay and a ten-person volunteer board of directors spent ten years assembling the collection of more than 50 gliders and models and finding a location for the museum.

== Collection ==
The museum has an extensive collection of gliders, including:

- Applebay Zia motorglider
- Applebay Zuni
- Advanced Soaring Concepts Falcon
- LET L-13 Blaník
- Bowlus Super Albatross
- Hoey-Johnson BG-12B
- Carbon Dragon motorglider
- Cascade Kasperwing I-80 ultralight motor glider
- DFS Olympia
- DFS Weihe
- FFA Diamant 16.5M
- DSK Duster prototype
- Frankfort Cinema - 2
- Fibera KK-1e Utu
- Franklin PS-2
- Glasflügel 401 H-401 Kestrel
- Grob G103a Twin II
- LAK Genesis 2
- Glasflügel 303 Mosquito motorglider
- Hall Cherokee II
- Hall Cherokee RM
- Laister LP-46
- Laister-Kauffman TG-4 (LK10A)
- Mitchell B-10 flying wing
- Maupin Woodstock One
- Miller Tern
- Monnett Monerai
- Moore SS-1
- Advanced Soaring Concepts Apex NASA Apex Remotely Piloted Sailplane
- Nelson Hummingbird PG-185B motorglider
- Primary Glider Northrup primary glider
- Oldershaw O-2
- Oldershaw O-3
- Prue Standard
- Ross R-6
- Scheibe Spatz
- Schleicher Ka 3 Santee SA-3/KA-3
- Schweizer SGS 1-26
- Schweizer SGS 1-23
- Schweizer SGU 2-22
- Slingsby T.21 RAF Sedbergh T.X. Mk. 1
- Slingsby Tandem Tutor RAF Kirby Cadet T.X. Mk. 3
- Scanlan SG-1A
- Schleicher ASW 15
- Schleicher Ka-4 Rhonlerche - 2
- Schleicher Ka 6CR PE
- Schleicher Ka 6e
- Schreder HP-11
- Schreder HP-12A Modified to 13M by Dick Johnson
- Schreder HP-14
- Schreder HP-18
- Schreder HP-20
- Stamer Lippisch SG-38 Zögling primary glider fuselage - replica
- Seagull hang glider
- Strojnik S-2 Motorglider
- SZD-36 Cobra 15
- UFM Easy Riser ultralight
- Ultralight Products hang glider
- Wills Wing hang glider
- Wright Glider 1902 Wright Glider Replica

== See also ==
- List of aerospace museums
- List of gliders
