= Barringer Trophy =

The Lewin B. Barringer Memorial Trophy
- Awarded for: The greatest straight-line distance soaring flight during the previous calendar year, other than the U.S. National Championships.
- Country: USA
- Presented by: Soaring Society of America (SSA)
- First award: 1948
- Final award: 2016
- Website: Official site

The Lewin B. Barringer Memorial Trophy was established by the will of Lewin Barringer in 1948. The original rules specified that the trophy would be awarded for the longest distance soaring flight from any type of launching method other than airplane tow. The trophy would become the permanent property of any pilot who won it three times in succession.

== History ==
Paul Bikle was the first pilot to win the Trophy three times in succession. He subsequently donated the trophy back to the Soaring Society of America as a perpetual trophy. In 1957 the SSA Directors, with Bikle's approval, changed the rules to allow for any type of launch method and include any flights, other than those flown at the US National Contest.

== Recipients ==
Recipients of this trophy, from 1948 to present, include:

Year	Recipient	Qualifying flight
1948	Donald Pollard	206 miles (332 km) from Elmira, New York to Asbury Park, New Jersey in an Arsenal Air 100
1951	William Beuby	141.5 miles (227.7 km) on July 4, 1951, likely in a Schweizer TG-2.
1952	Paul Bikle	217 miles (349 km) from El Mirage, California to Yuma, Arizona in his Schweizer 1-23
1953	Paul Bikle	202 miles (325 km) in his Schweizer 1-23
1954	Paul Bikle	249 miles (401 km) in his Schweizer 1-23
1955	Paul Bikle	280 miles (450 km) in his Schweizer 1-23
1956	Paul Bikle	210 miles (340 km) in his Schweizer 1-23
1957	Sterling Starr	333 miles (536 km) on May 19, 1957, from Bishop, California to Escalante, Utah in a Schweizer 1-23. This flight completed Starr's Diamond badge
1958	Julien Audette	236 miles (380 km)on July 27, 1958, from Regina, Saskatchewan, to Minot, North Dakota in a Schweizer 1-26. Audette is the only winner to start their flight outside of the US.
1959	Harland Ross	365.5 miles (588.2 km) from Kent, Texas to Farley, New Mexico in his Ross R-6. The flight earned Ross his Diamond Distance and completed his Diamond badge, No. 14 in the US.
1960	Joseph Lincoln	455.5 miles (733.1 km) from Prescott, Arizona, to Variadero, New Mexico, in his Schweizer 1-23
1961	John Ryan	454 miles (731 km) from Kingman, Arizona, to Santa Fe, New Mexico, in his Sisu 1A
1962	Harald Jensen	435 miles (700 km) from Naperville, Illinois, to Nashville, Tennessee, in a Vogt Lo-150
1963	Alvin Parker	487 miles (784 km) from Odessa, Texas, to Great Bend, Kansas, for the Distance to a Goal World Record in his Sisu 1A
1964	Alvin Parker	647 miles (1,041 km) from Odessa, Texas, to Kimball, Nebraska, on July 31, 1964, in his Sisu 1A. This was the first glider flight in the world to exceed 1,000 kilometres (620 mi) and set the World Record for Free Distance
1965	Alvin Parker	371 miles (597 km)from Odessa, Texas to Elkhart, Kansas, in his Sisu 1A.
1966	Michael Berger	387.2 miles (623.1 km) on May 22, 1966, from Westcliff, Colorado, to Mankato, Kansas, in a Schleicher Ka 6. The flight started with a climb in wave to 31,000 feet and ended at Mankato because Berger only had maps that went to that point. This was only his second cross country flight and earned him Gold Distance (finishing his Gold badge), Diamond Distance, and Diamond Altitude.
1967	Wallace Scott	552 miles (888 km) from Odessa, Texas, to Casa Grande, Arizona, in his Schleicher Ka 6E. Scott had declared Gila Bend, Arizona as a goal which would've been a World Record but was stopped by storms along the route.
1968	Wallace Scott	492.2 miles (792.1 km) from Odessa, Texas, to near Ulysses, Kansas, on August 5, 1968, in his Sisu 1A
1969	Wallace Scott	606 miles (975 km) from Odessa, Texas, to Gila Bend, Arizona, on August 22, 1969, in his Schleicher ASW 12. This flight earned Scott the World Record for Distance to a Goal.
1970	Ben Greene and Wallace Scott	717 miles (1,154 km) from Odessa, Texas, to Columbus, Nebraska, on July 26, 1970. Both Scott and Greene flew Schleicher ASW 12's. With this flight they jointly set a new World Record for Free Distance.
1971	Wallace Scott	585 miles (941 km) from Odessa, Texas, to Estrella, Arizona, on September 11, 1971, in his Schleicher ASW 12.
1972	Wallace Scott II	635 miles (1,022 km) from Odessa, Texas, to Lexington, Nebraska, in his Schleicher ASW 12.
1973	Wallace Scott II	639 miles (1,028 km) from Odessa, Texas, to Kearney, Nebraska, on August 27, 1973, in his Schleicher ASW 12.
1974	Jerome Trowbridge	476 miles (766 km) from Boca Raton, Florida, to Montezuma, Georgia, on April 8, 1974, in his Schempp-Hirth Standard Cirrus.
1975	Wallace Scott	600.9 miles (967.1 km) from Odessa, Texas, to Imperial, Nebraska, in his Schleicher ASW 12
1976	Wallace Scott	540.16 miles (869.30 km) from Odessa, Texas, in his Grob Astir CS.
1977	Wallace Scott	716 miles (1,152 km) from Odessa, Texas, to Primrose, Nebraska, in his Schweizer 1-35. The flight set a US National Record for Free Distance in the 15 Meter Class.
1978	Wallace Scott	629 miles (1,012 km) from Odessa, Texas, to Grant, Nebraska
1979	Wallace Scott	590 miles (950 km) from Odessa, Texas, to McCook, Nebraska in a Slingsby Vega
1980	Wallace Scott	675 miles (1,086 km)
1981	Marion Griffith Jr.	645 miles (1,038 km) from Refugio, Texas, to Liberal, Kansas, in a Glasflugel 604. This flight also set a US distance to a goal record.
1982	Bill Seed Jr and Wallace Scott	533 miles (858 km) from Brownsville, Texas, to Bowie, Texas. Scott flew his Schleicher ASW 20 and Seed flew a Schleicher ASW 17B on the flight which ended in a simultaneous landing
1983	Wallace Scott	668.36 miles (1,075.62 km) from Odessa, Texas, to Dalton, Nebraska, on August 17.
1984	Michael Koerner	903 miles (1,453 km) from California City, California, to Seminole, Texas, in his Slingsby Kestrel 19. As of October 2011, this flight still stands as a US National Record for Free Distance in the Open Class Singleplace Category.
1985	Michael Koerner	449.9 miles (724.0 km) from California City, California, to Wells, Nevada, on May 25, 1985.
1986	Wallace Scott	526.6 miles (847.5 km) from Uvalde, Texas, to Perryton, Texas, on August 13, 1986.
1987	Wallace Scott	569.03 miles (915.77 km) from Uvalde, Texas, to Medicine Lodge, Kansas, in his Schleicher ASW 20 on August 25, 1987.
1988	Wallace Scott	716.74 miles (1,153.48 km) from Odessa, Texas, to Hyannis, Nebraska, on July 5, 1988.
1989	Wallace Scott	649.16 miles (1,044.72 km) from Odessa, Texas, to Great Bend, Kansas, in his Schleicher ASW 20 on July 29, 1989.
1990	Wallace Scott	725.59 miles (1,167.72 km) from Odessa, Texas, to Thedford, Nebraska, in his Schleicher ASW 20 on July 7, 1990.
1991	Ira Phillips	541.82 miles (871.97 km) from Gadsden, Alabama, to Keyser, West Virginia, in his Schleicher ASW 20 on October 6, 1991.
1992	Mark Keene	333.90 miles (537.36 km)from Refugio, Texas to Nevada, Texas, in his Schweizer 1-26.
1993	Wallace Scott	539.87 miles (868.84 km) from Odessa, Texas, to Goodland, Kansas, on September 21, 1993, in his Schleicher ASW 20.
1994	Hank Marlowe	669.94 miles (1,078.16 km) from Llano, California, to Weiser, Idaho, on July 9, 1994, in his Glaser-Dirks DG-600.
1995	Michael Koerner	554.74 miles (892.77 km) from Llano, California, to Lakeview, Arizona.
1996	Hank Marlowe and John O'Connell Graybill	544 miles (875 km) from Llano, California, to McDermitt, Oregon. They flew on the same day but never saw each on other during the flight.
1997	Karl Striedieck	805 miles (1,296 km) from Eagle Field, Pennsylvania, to Selma, Alabama, on April 18, 1997. As of January 2012, this flight still hold US National Records for Free Distance in the 15-meter class and Distance to a Goal in Open and 15 Meter class
1998	Hank Marlowe	431 miles (694 km) from Llano, California, to Battle Mountain, Nevada, in his Schleicher ASW 27 on August 8, 1998
1999	Michael Koerner	543.91 miles (875.34 km) in his Schempp-Hirth Ventus
2000	Robert Maronde, Phillippe Athuil, and John O'Connell Graybill	496.68 miles (799.33 km) from Llano, California, to Mount Pleasant, Utah. Maronde flew his Schleicher ASW 27, Athuil his Rolladen-Schneider LS6, and Graybill his Schempp-Hirth Ventus.
2001	Michael Koerner	549.95 miles (885.06 km) from Llano, California, to Heber City, Utah, in his Schempp-Hirth Ventus on May 26, 2001.
2002	Michael Koerner	553.95 miles (891.50 km) from Llano, California, to Lakeview, Oregon, in his Schempp-Hirth Ventus on May 24, 2002.
2003	Phillippe Athuil	645.6 miles (1,039.0 km) from Llano, California, to Aberdeen, Idaho.
2004	Gordon Boettger	698.8 miles (1,124.6 km) from Minden, Nevada, to Steamboat Springs, Colorado, in his Glasflugel Kestrel 17.
2005	Michael Koerner	602.3 miles (969.3 km) from Llano, California, to Burley, Idaho, on July 18, 2005, in his Schempp-Hirth Ventus.
2006	Michael Koerner	592.53 miles (953.58 km) from Llano, California, to Paisley, Oregon, on July 8, 2006, in his Schempp-Hirth Ventus.
2007	Jim Ketcham	694.85 miles (1,118.25 km) from Agua Dulce, California, to Bend, Oregon, in his Schleicher ASH 26E.
2008	Henry Retting	527.3 miles (848.6 km) from Boca Raton, Florida to Griffin, Georgia in his Schempp-Hirth Discus.
2009	Phillippe Athuil	593.3 miles (954.8 km) from Llano, California, to Paisley, Idaho, in his Schleicher ASH 25 on August 1, 2009.
2010	Michael Koerner	565 miles (909 km) from Llano, California, to Rome State, Oregon, in his Schempp-Hirth Ventus.
2011	Gary Osoba	565 miles (909 km) from Zapata, Texas to Amarillo, Texas in his Marsden Gemini on July 2, 2011.
2012	Kevin Wayt	604.24 miles (972.43 km) from Tehachapi, California to Burns, Oregon in his Schempp-Hirth Ventus on September 8, 2012. This flight also won Kevin the annual Dust Devil Dash free distance soaring competition.
2013	Gordon Boettger and Hugh Bennett	701.46 miles (1,128.89 km) from Minden, Nevada to Gunnison, Colorado in their Schempp-Hirth Duo Discus on April 14, 2013. This flight also set the US Multiplace Free Distance Record.
2014	Gordon Boettger and Hugh Bennett	879.2 miles (1,414.9 km) from Minden, Nevada to Casper, Wyoming in their Schempp-Hirth Duo Discus on May 4, 2014.
2015	Paul Seifried	319.3 miles (513.9 km) from Blairstown, New Jersey to Lovingston, Virginia in his Rolladen-Schneider LS-4 on April 24, 2015.

== See also ==
- List of aviation awards
