= Mescalero (disambiguation) =

Mescalero is a main subdivision of the Apache Native American nation.

Mescalero may also mean:

- Mescalero language
- Mescalero, New Mexico, a census-designated place in the United States
- Mescalero Ridge, an escarpment on the western edge of the Llano Estacado
- The Mescaleros, Joe Strummer's back-up band
- Mescalero (album), by ZZ Top
- Cessna T-41 Mescalero, a 1960s vintage U.S. Air Force single-engine piston-prop primary flight trainer derived from the civil-market Cessna 172
- Applebay GA-111 Mescalero, an American glider, of which one prototype was built in 1975
