= Oldershaw O-2 =

American glider

O-2

General information
- Type: Glider
- National origin: United States
- Designer: Vernon Oldershaw
- Status: Sole example in the US Southwest Soaring Museum
- Number built: One

History
- Introduction date: 1961
- First flight: 1961
- Variant: Oldershaw O-3

The Oldershaw O-2, officially registered as the Oldershaw Jana-Linn O-2, is an American high-wing, single seat, V-tailed glider that was designed and built by Vernon Oldershaw.

== Design and development ==
The O-2 was designed by Oldershaw to compete with Dick Johnson's Ross-Johnson RJ-5.

The O-2 is constructed of wood. Its 49.2 ft (15 m) span wing employs a NACA 63 (3)-618 airfoil at the wing root, with a NACA 63 (2)-615 at the wing tip. The wing is equipped with dive brakes. The landing gear is a retractable monowheel.

Only one O-2 was built.

== Operational history ==
The O-2 first flew in 1961 and was flown by Oldershaw in the 1962 and 1962 US Nationals. The aircraft has made a number of flights in excess of 200 mi (322 km), including one of 294.6 mi (474.1 km). Oldershaw later sold the aircraft to Don Gaede of Torrance, California and it was reportedly still being actively flown in the 1980s. Gaede remodeled the cockpit and introduced a new nose shape. The O-2 was later donated to the US Southwest Soaring Museum, where it is on display.

== Aircraft on display ==
- US Southwest Soaring Museum

== Specifications (O-2) ==
Data from Sailplane Directory and Soaring

General characteristics

- Crew: One
- Wingspan: 49 ft 3 in (15 m)
- Wing area: 108 sq ft (10.0 m^{2})
- Aspect ratio: 22.4:1
- Airfoil: Root NACA 63 (3)-618, Tip: NACA 63 (2)-615
- Empty weight: 520 lb (236 kg)
- Gross weight: 780 lb (354 kg)

Performance

- Maximum glide ratio: 39:1 at 67 mph (108 km/h)
- Rate of sink: 131 ft/min (0.67 m/s) at 55 mph (89 km/h)
- Wing loading: 7.2 lb/sq ft (35 kg/m^{2})

== See also ==
Related lists

- List of gliders
