= SG1 (disambiguation) =

SG1 commonly refers to Stargate SG-1, a television show.

SG1 may also refer to:

- Stargate SG-1 (roleplaying game) based on the TV show, released in 2003
- SG1 (or SG/1), a version of the Heckler & Koch G3 rifle
- SG1, a minor planet notation indicating the thirty-third discovery in late September of a given year, see provisional designation in astronomy
  - 1941 SG1, the asteroid 1546 Izsák
  - 1955 SG1, the asteroid 4300 Marg Edmondson
  - 1973 SG1, the asteroid 14792 Thyestes
  - 1974 SG1, the asteroid 2756 Dzhangar
  - 1987 SG1, the asteroid 6474 Choate
  - 1989 SG1, the asteroid 7934 Sinatra
  - 1992 SG1, the asteroid 7250 Kinoshita
- Scanlan SG-1, a glider
- Schlachtgeschwader 1, a German Luftwaffe unit during World War II
- SG1 postcode district, in the SG postcode area, in Stevenage in the United Kingdom

== See also ==
- SGI (disambiguation)
- SGL (disambiguation)
