= T59 =

T59 may refer to:

- Type 59 tank, a Chinese tank
- Bugatti T59, a French racing car
- Cooper T59, a British racing car
- Slingsby T.59 Kestrel, a British glider
