= AS 12 =

AS 12, AS-12, AS.12, etc. may refer to:

- SS.12/AS.12, a missile
- AS-12 Kegler, a missile
- AS-12, Russian submarine Losharik
- USS Sperry (AS-12)
- Schleicher ASW 12
