= Advanced Soaring Concepts =

American aircraft manufacturer

- Company type: Private
- Industry: Aerospace
- Founded: 1991
- Founders: Tor Jensen, Dewey Northcutt
- Headquarters: Camarillo, California, United States
- Products: Sailplanes

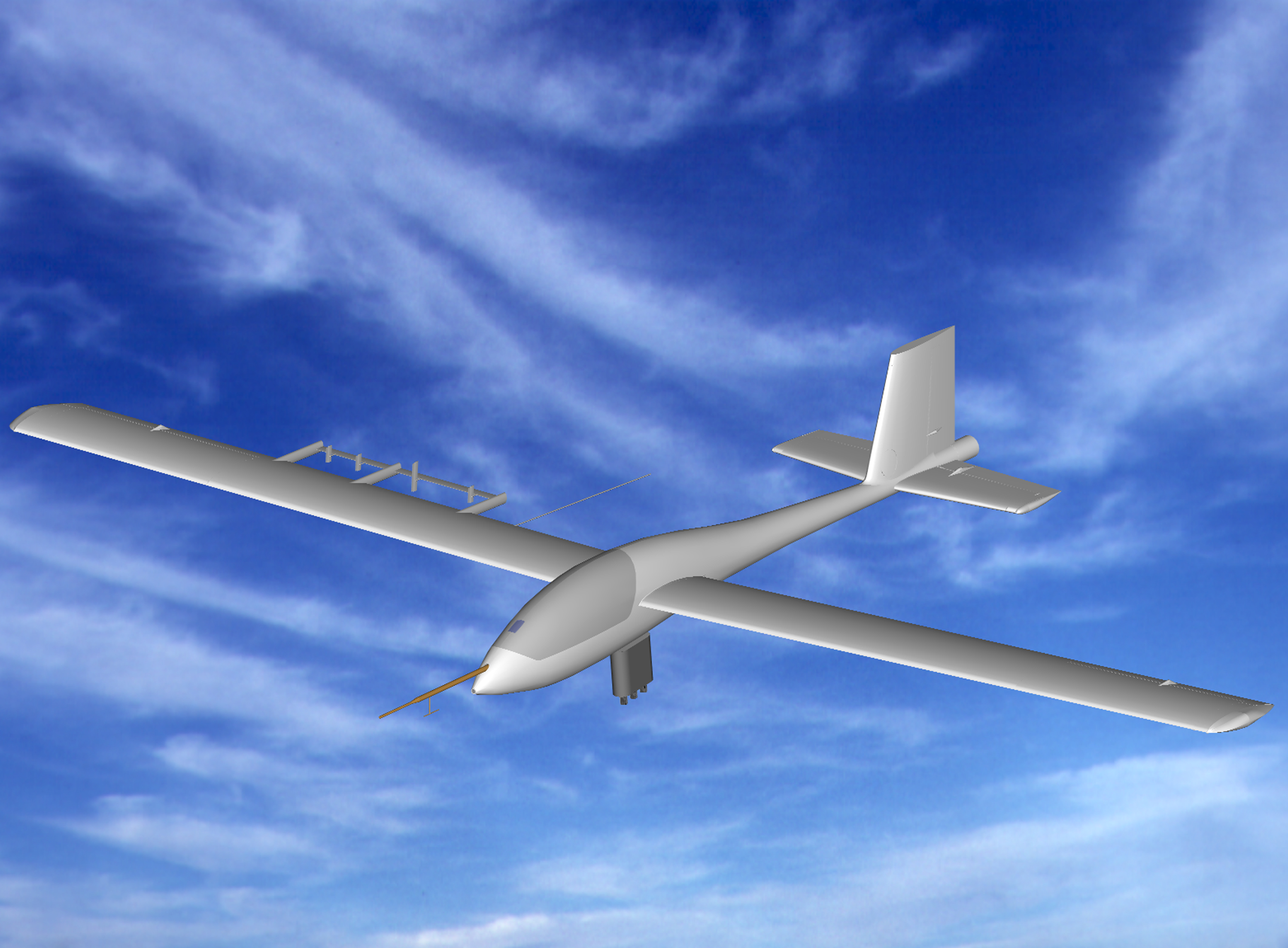
A computer-generated image of Apex, a research plane developed by ASC for NASA’s ERAST program

Advanced Soaring Concepts (ASC) was an American sailplane manufacturer based in Camarillo, California. Founded in 1991 by Tor Jensen and Dewey Northcutt, the company specialized in designing and producing high-performance gliders, primarily offered in kit form for amateur construction.

== History ==
Jensen and Northcutt, both experts in composite materials, initially collaborated through their company Norjen Engineering, which undertook various composite fabrication projects, including aerospace components and concept cars. Recognizing a niche in the sailplane market, they established Advanced Soaring Concepts to produce affordable, high-performance gliders. By offering their aircraft in kit form, ASC provided a cost-effective alternative to European-built sailplanes, which were typically sold fully assembled and at higher prices.

== Aircraft ==
=== Spirit ===
The ASC Spirit, also known as the American Spirit, was a single-seat, mid-wing, T-tail sailplane designed for the FAI Standard Class. First flown in 1992, it featured a 15-meter wingspan and was constructed using a combination of welded steel tubing and carbon-fiber-reinforced polymer materials. The Spirit was marketed as a homebuilt aircraft and gained a following for its combination of performance and affordability.

=== Falcon ===
The ACS Falcon, also known as the American Falcon, is a single-seat, mid-wing, T-tail sailplane designed for the FAI 15-Metre Class. First flown in 1993, it was developed as a racing variant of the Spirit, featuring several enhancements for competitive performance. The Falcon's construction utilizes fiberglass sandwich materials, with a carbon-fiber-reinforced polymer spar, and an Aramid-reinforced cockpit built around a welded steel tube frame.

The 15-meter wingspan can be extended to 18 meters with optional wingtip extensions. The aircraft is equipped with full-span trailing edge flaps, adjustable to +15°, +10°, +5°, 0°, and -5°, coupled with top-surface Schempp-Hirth-style airbrakes for glidepath control. The cockpit accommodates pilots up to 76 inches (193 cm) in height and weighing up to 260 pounds (118 kg) with a parachute. The landing gear is a retractable monowheel design.

=== Apex ===
One of ASC's most notable projects was the development of the Apex, a high-altitude, long-duration research sailplane designed for NASA. The Apex was intended to explore the upper limits of sailplane performance and contribute to atmospheric science research, but ultimately never made it to production.
