= Wally Scott =

American aviator and author

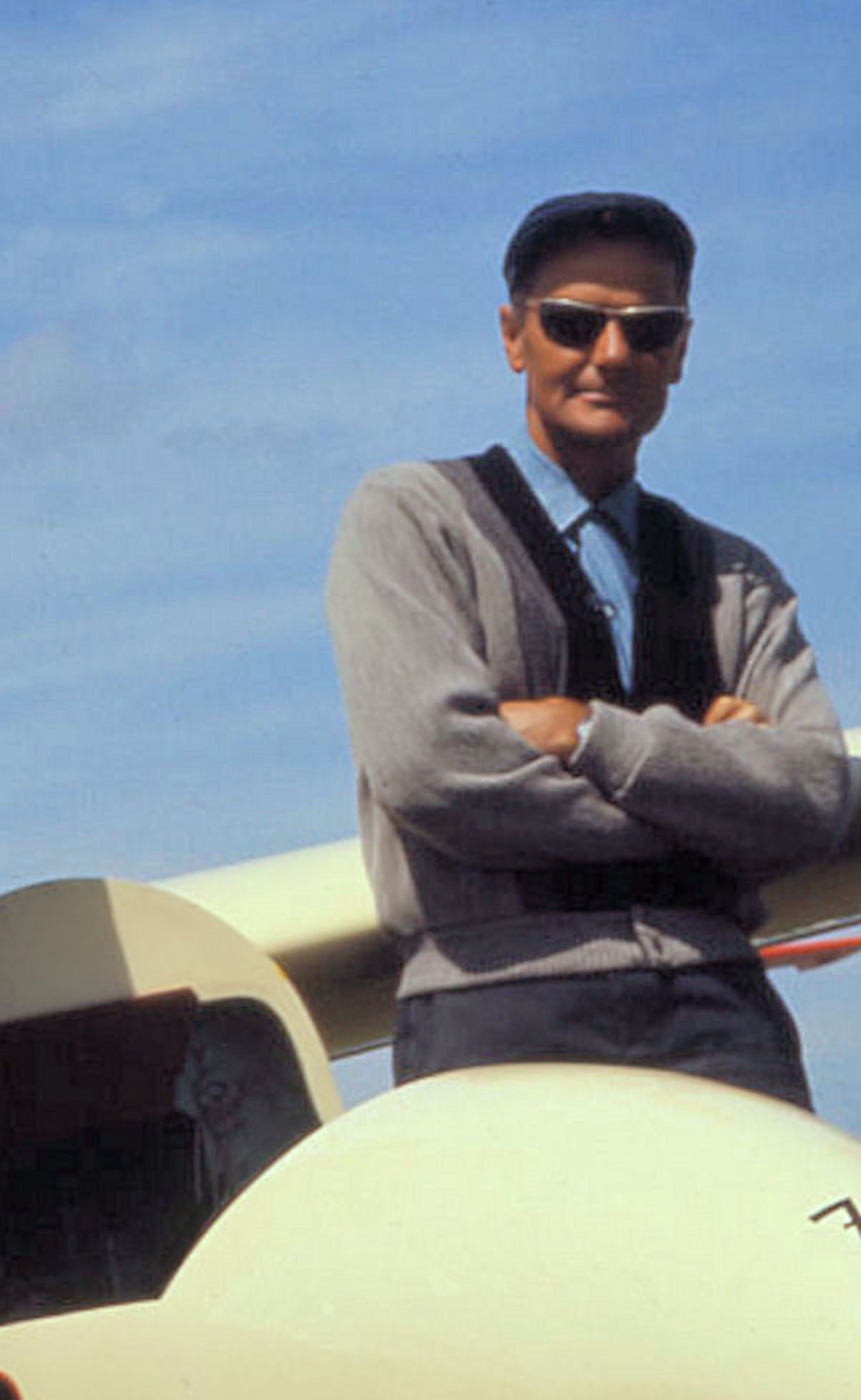
- Wally Scott in 1965
- Born: Wallace Aiken Scott; July 4, 1924; Van Horn, Texas, US
- Died: February 8, 2003 (aged 78); Odessa, Texas, US
- Known for: Gliding
- Spouse: Beverly Mae Boots Jackson
- Aviation career
- Air force: United States Army Air Corps

Wallace Aiken Scott (July 4, 1924 – February 8, 2003) was an American aviator and author, a holder of several international sailplane records, and a multi-time recipient of the Lewin B. Barringer trophy awarded for the longest, free-distance, sailplane flight of each year made in the United States. Over 36 years Wallace Wally Scott increased the distance flown in a sailplane.

Scott became a pioneer of free-distance, straight-out, soaring flight and won four Fédération Aéronautique Internationale (FAI)-certified, world soaring records, 20 Lewin B. Barringer Trophies, and numerous other awards and honors, including induction into the Soaring Hall of Fame in 1965.

Scott flew various sailplanes more than 300,000 miles while twice winning the transcontinental Smirnoff Sailplane Derby race, the longest sailplane race in the world. On July 26, 1970, he and Ben Greene co-set the world distance record of 716.95 miles, both flying ASW-12 sailplanes.

== Early years ==
Scott was born on July 4, 1924, in Van Horn, Texas, the son of Claude Winfred and Maggie Elizabeth Scott. He had four siblings and the family left Van Horn in 1926 and moved to Best, Texas, when Scott was two years old. The economy eventually forced the Scott family to move north to Odessa, Texas when Scott was age 12. Here they established the family’s successful movie theatre business.

== Early aviation career ==
Scott learned to fly at Fort Stockton, Texas where his brother, Oliver "Scotty", taught him to fly. His brother had become an instructor with the Civilian Pilot Training Program in Fort Stockton. Scott later wrote, “On October 2, 1942, the day after my introductory flight, O. E. Scott "Scotty", logged for W.A. Scott thirty minutes of dual in Cub J-2.”

In 1943, Scott earned his pilot’s license and, with his brother's help, he became a flight instructor at the Fort Stockton detachment of Pacific Air Schools, Ltd. Scott taught his sixth and final class of cadets in January 1944 and by March had left Fort Stockton and joined the Ferry Command branch of the Army Air Corps.

== World War II experiences ==
Scott was accepted to go to Randolph Field in San Antonio, Texas and attend flight school in order to obtain an aircraft instrument rating. After graduation, he reported to Nashville, Tennessee to continue his training with Ferry Command. After completing his training, Scott was assigned to Palm Springs, California and served as a co-pilot on the Boeing B-17 Flying Fortress, Douglas C-47 Skytrain and Douglas C-49.

In August and September 1944, Scott participated in several domestic evacuation flights, taking wounded soldiers from the Pacific coast to the eastern United States and vice versa. On October 18, 1944, he was assigned to a C-47 to be ferried from Bangor, Maine to join the Air Transport Group based at Le Bourget in Paris, France. Scott’s duties while based at Le Bourget included delivering supplies to airfields near the front lines and flying wounded personnel to England.

In February 1945, Scott was transferred to Dum Dum Airfield on the northeastern edge of Calcutta, India and away from the front lines. Dum Dum airfield served as a major supply point for ferrying supplies to Chiang Kai-shek’s forces in Kunming, China. Scott flew cargo and personnel over The Hump in both Curtiss-Wright C-46 Commandos and C-47 aircraft. With the war over, on December 16, 1945, Scott returned to the United States.

== Marriage and children ==
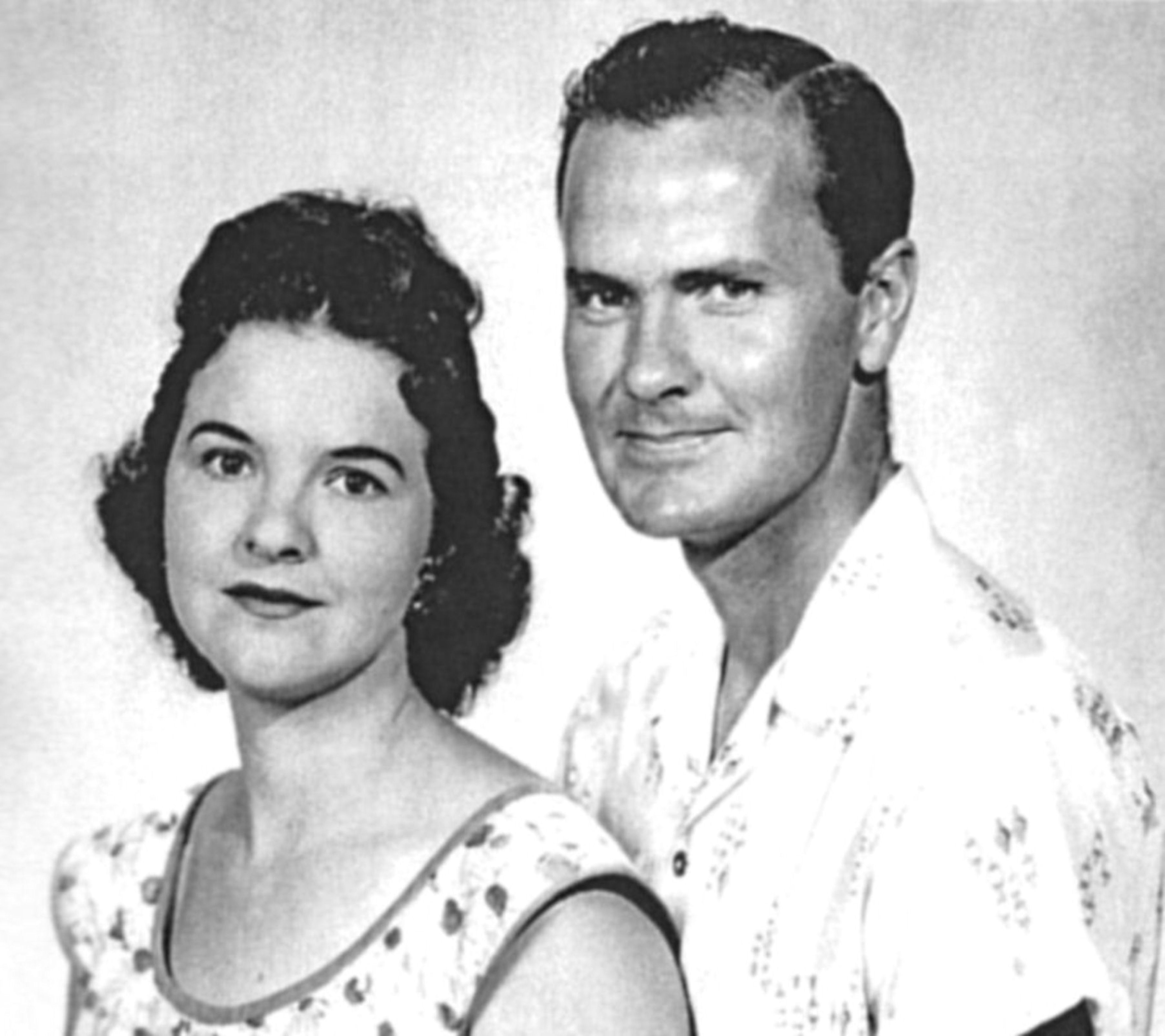
Wally Scott and wife Boots

After returning to the United States, Scott met Beverly "Boots" Mae Jackson in January 1946 and they were married on May 12, 1946. Between December 1947 and April 1951 they had four children, a son and daughter and twin girls.

== Glider flying ==
In the mid-1950s, Scott and his wife took up archery . In 1956, as president of the Permian Basin Archery Club, Scott won the highest score of any instinctive archer in the National Field Archery Association’s Championship Tournament in San Antonio, Texas. His wife also developed into an expert archer in her own right, and they would eventually win the husband/wife team trophy in the state championships in Odessa in 1959 with Boots’ individual, second-place finish.

Archery was eventually put on hold when Scott began flying powered aircraft again. In March 1961, Scott took his first flight in a glider and within a few months he had purchased a new Schweizer SGS 1-26 sailplane.

Scott’s first record flight was an 8.5 hour, 443.5 mi (714 km), dog-leg flight from Odessa, Texas to Clayton, New Mexico flown on August 6, 1963. He placed 2nd in his first major soaring competition, the 31st Annual National Soaring Championships, which was held from June 29 to July 9, 1964 in McCook, Nebraska.

Scott purchased a variety of sailplanes over the next several decades, and competed in several national and World Gliding Championships in different glider competition classes.

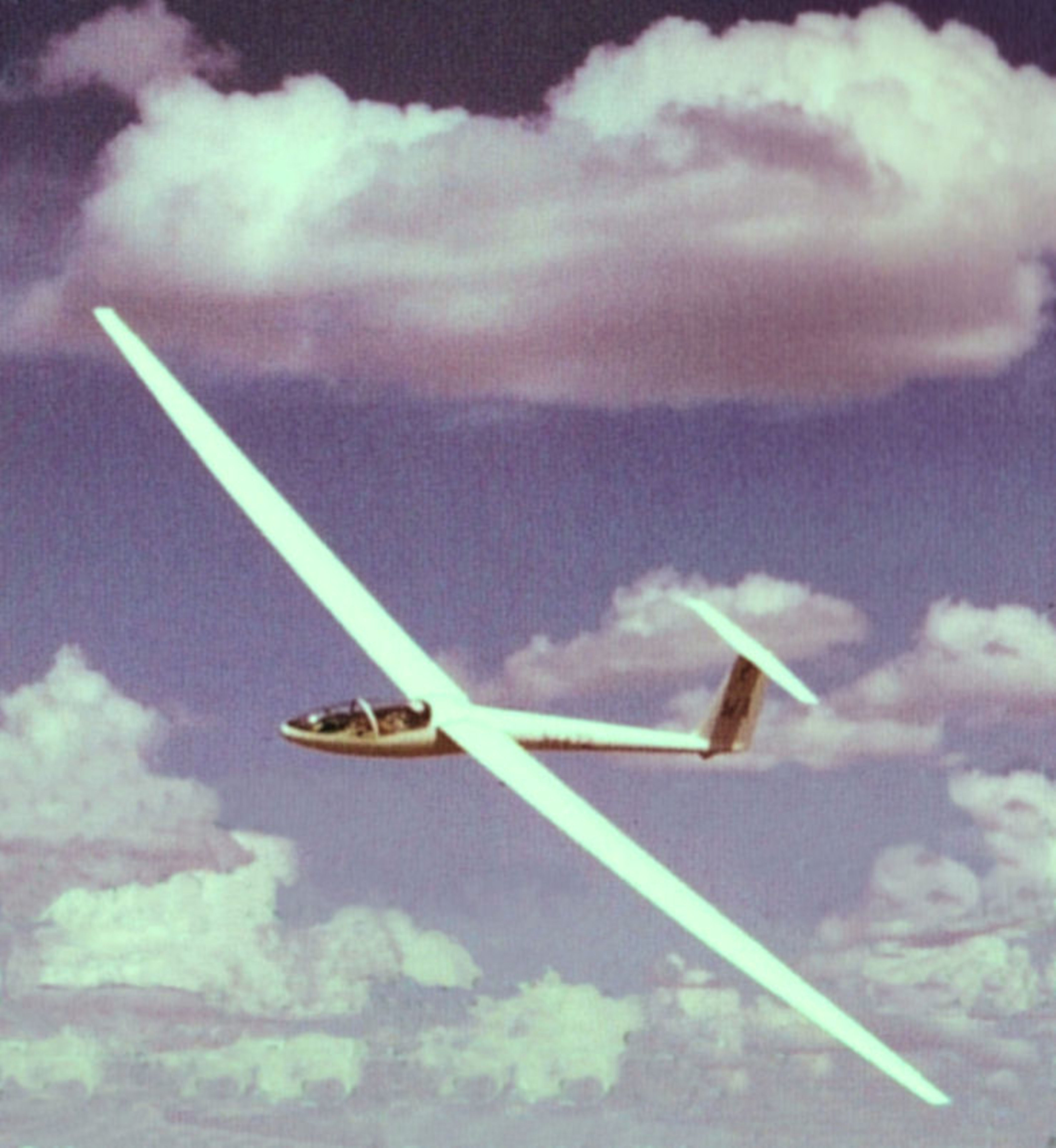
Scott flying his Schleicher ASW 12 sailplane WA

== Later life and death ==
In the late 1990s Scott mostly flew locally until January 7, 1999, when he underwent surgery on his knee. The surgery would weaken both his body and spirit. Scott was eventually diagnosed with Alzheimer's disease and never flew again. On February 8, 2003, Scott died in Odessa, Texas, at the age of 78 after contracting pneumonia; he had flown nearly 7,000 hours and over 300,000 miles in sailplanes during his life.

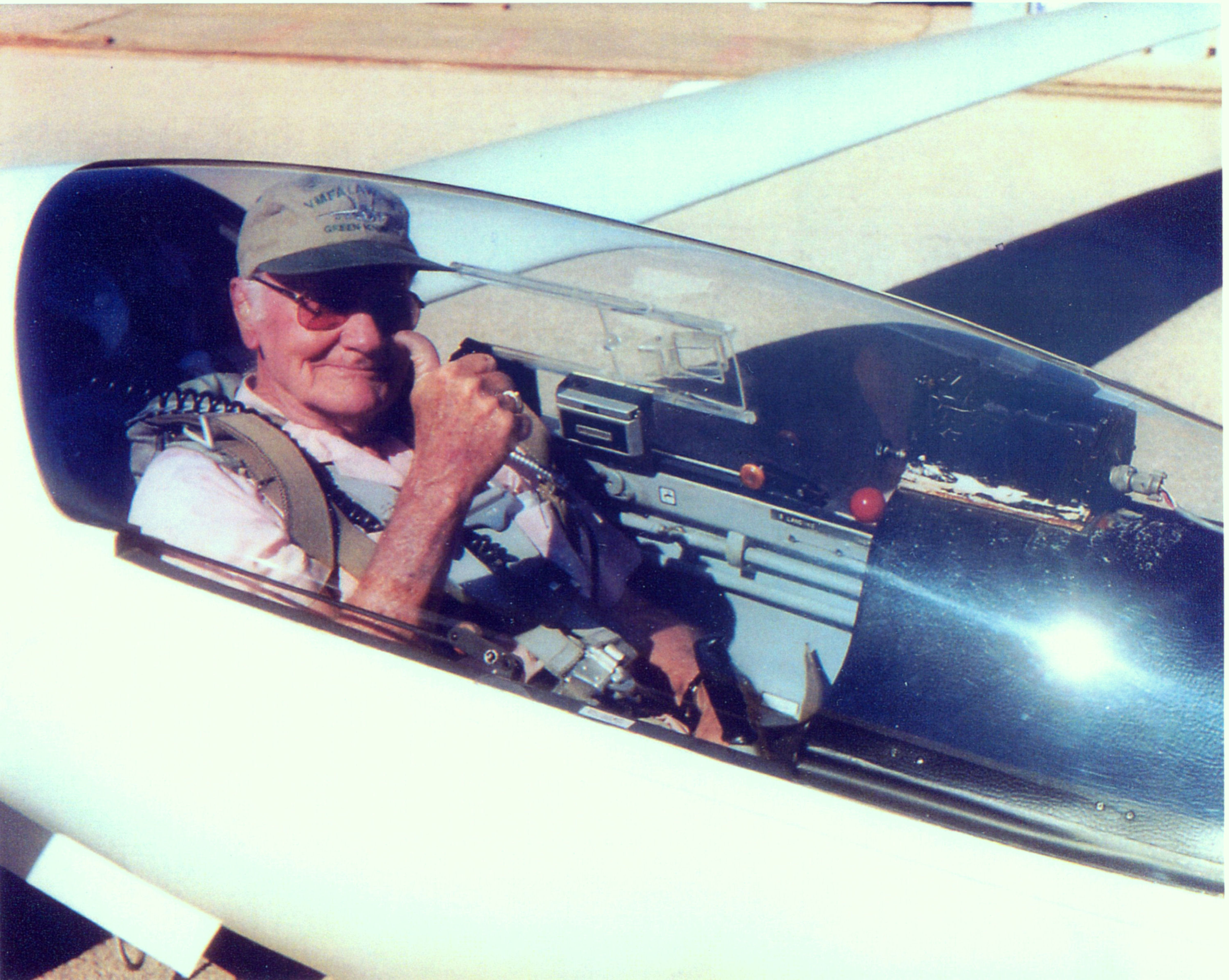
Wally Scott in his Schleicher ASW 20 sailplane

== Awards and soaring records ==
Year Received	Award
1965	Inducted into Soaring Hall of Fame
1967	The Lewin B. Barringer Memorial Trophy: 552 mi (888 km)
1968	The Lewin B. Barringer Memorial Trophy: 492.2 mi (792 km)
1969	The Lewin B. Barringer Memorial Trophy: 605.23 mi (974 km), Larissa Stroukoff Memorial Trophy
1970	The Lewin B. Barringer Memorial Trophy shared with Benjamin W. Greene: 716.952 mi (1,154 km), Soaring Society of America Exceptional Achievement Award
1971	The Lewin B. Barringer Memorial Trophy: 578.48 mi (931 km)
1972	The Lewin B. Barringer Memorial Trophy: 634.85 mi (1,022 km)
1973	The Lewin B. Barringer Memorial Trophy: 642.09 mi (1,033 km)
1975	The Lewin B. Barringer Memorial Trophy: 600.9 mi (967 km)
1976	The Lewin B. Barringer Memorial Trophy: 540 mi (869 km)
1977	The Lewin B. Barringer Memorial Trophy: 716 mi (1,152 km)
1978	The Lewin B. Barringer Memorial Trophy: 628.98 mi (1,012 km)
1979	The Lewin B. Barringer Memorial Trophy: 590 mi (950 km)
1980	The Lewin B. Barringer Memorial Trophy: 675 mi (1,086 km)
1982	The Lewin B. Barringer Memorial Trophy shared with William H. Seed Jr.: 533 mi (858 km), Barron Hilton Cup
1983	The Lewin B. Barringer Memorial Trophy: 668.36 mi (1,076 km)
1985	Barron Hilton Cup
1986	The Lewin B. Barringer Memorial Trophy: 526.6 mi (847 km)
1987	The Lewin B. Barringer Memorial Trophy: 569.03 mi (916 km)
1988	The Lewin B. Barringer Memorial Trophy: 716.74 mi (1,153 km), SSA Exceptional Achievement Award
1989	The Lewin B. Barringer Memorial Trophy: 649.16 mi (1,045 km)
1990	The Lewin B. Barringer Memorial Trophy: 725.89 mi (1,168 km)
1993	The Lewin B. Barringer Memorial Trophy: 539.87 mi (869 km).
2003	Joseph C. Lincoln Writing Award 2004 – Soaring Magazine 2003 reprint from 1982 of an article titled “The Preparation and Execution of Long-Distance Flights.”
2005	Inducted in Texas Aviation Hall of Fame

== World soaring records ==
National Aeronautic Association and Fédération Aéronautique Internationale (FAI) Awards:

Date Received	Award
July 23, 1964	FAI World Record - Straight Distance to a declared goal: Odessa, TX – Goodland, KS 837.75 km – Ka-6CR (N1304S), FAI record # 4406
July 12, 1965	10th FAI World Soaring Championship, South Cerney, England – 6th place overall
August 22, 1969	FAI World Record – Straight Distance to a declared goal: Odessa, TX – Gila Bend, AZ. 974.04 km – ASW 12 (N134Z), FAI record # 4408
July 26, 1970	FAI World Record – Straight Distance Odessa, TX – Columbus, NE 1,153.821 km – ASW 12 (N4472), FAI record # 5409
August 3, 1970	FAI World Record – Out-and-Return, Odessa, TX – Pampa, TX and return 860.00 km – ASW 12 (N4472), FAI record # 5421
July 4, 1970	12th FAI World Gliding Championship, Marfa, TX., 9th place overall
July 2, 1977	15-meter National Record, Odessa, TX – Primrose, NE, 716.31 miles / 1152.79 km
July 11, 1980	15-meter Triangle Speed Record, Odessa, TX – Roswell, NM, Plain View, TX & return 750 km / 7hrs 27min / 65.84 mph
August 31, 1985	545 mile Triangle – 15-meter record, Odessa, TX – Robert Lee, TX, Del Rio, TX Wink, TX 68 mph. Also qualified for Barron Hilton Cup winning flight

== Articles authored ==
- 443.5 Miles by 1-26 N8606R, Soaring Magazine, October 1963
- The Second 500, Soaring Magazine, November 1967
- Marfa Report, circa 1970, self-published, a report on how to soar in the areas of southwest Texas, specifically around Marfa, TX
- Showdown Over Gila Bend, The account of his world record 605-mile goal distance flight, Soaring Magazine, January 1970 by Douglas Lamont
- The Big One, by Wallace Scott and Ben Greene, Soaring Magazine, February 1971
- The 1976 Smirnoff Derby, Soaring Magazine, August 1976
- The Preparation and Execution of Long-Distance Flights, Soaring Magazine, June 1982
- Attack on Aconcagua, by Wallace Scott and Guido Haymann, Soaring Magazine, May/June 1986

== Bibliography ==
- Hilbert Thomas, Samantha. WA-the life of soaring legend Wally Scott. BTLink Publishing, 2010 ISBN 978-0-9831306-0-4
- Soaring Magazine Archives, Soaring Society of America
