= Oldershaw O-3 =

American glider

O-3

General information
- Type: Glider and later motor glider
- National origin: United States
- Designer: Vernon Oldershaw
- Status: Out of production
- Number built: Two

History
- First flight: June 1967
- Developed from: Oldershaw O-2

The Oldershaw O-3 is an American high-wing, single seat, V-tailed glider that was designed by Vernon Oldershaw. Two examples were constructed as gliders and then both were later converted to motor gliders.

== Design and development ==
The O-3 was designed by Oldershaw as an improved version of the O-2 to complete in the FAI Open Class. As such it had longer and higher aspect ratio wings of 54 ft (16.5 m) span.

The O-3 first flew in June 1967. It is constructed of wood, with the nose made from fibreglass. Its wing employs a Wortmann 61-184 airfoil at the wing root, with a Wortmann 60-126 at the wing tip. The wing is equipped with trailing edge dive brakes. The landing gear is a retractable monowheel.

Both aircraft were constructed as pure gliders and then later motorized with the addition of a twin-cylinder, in-line Yamaha snowmobile engine. The engine is mounted behind the wing spar on a pylon that retracts forward into a bay closed by two doors. The power is transmitted through a belt-drive to a two-bladed propeller. The pylon can be deployed in eight seconds and uses the electric motor from a Ford Thunderbird window winder. The Yamaha powerplant gives a take-off roll of 1,000 ft (305 m) at an elevation of 500 ft (152 m) and produces a climb rate of 350 ft/min (1.8 m/s).

== Operational history ==
The first O-3 was flown by Oldershaw in several US National contests and Oldershaw completed his distance diamond in the aircraft with a flight of 431 mi (694 km).

Oldershaw's O-3 was listed by the Federal Aviation Administration as destroyed and removed from the register in July 1999. The US Southwest Soaring Museum lists it as being part of their collection.

O-3 serial number 2 was built by Carlton Kibler of Porterville, California and officially registered as a Fry-Kibler O3A Renigade in 1979. In May 2011 the aircraft was still on the FAA registry.

== Aircraft on display ==
- US Southwest Soaring Museum

== Specifications (O-3) ==
Data from Sailplane Directory and Soaring

General characteristics

- Crew: One
- Wingspan: 54 ft (16 m)
- Wing area: 124 sq ft (11.5 m^{2})
- Aspect ratio: 23.54:1
- Airfoil: Root Wortmann 61-184, Tip: Wortmann 60-126
- Empty weight: 760 lb (345 kg)
- Gross weight: 1,000 lb (454 kg)

Performance

- Maximum glide ratio: 41:1 at 67 mph (108 km/h)
- Rate of sink: 131 ft/min (0.67 m/s) at 56 mph (90 km/h)
- Wing loading: 8.0 lb/sq ft (39 kg/m^{2})

== See also ==
Related development

- Oldershaw O-2

Related lists

- List of gliders
