= Ross R-6 =

American glider

R-6

General information
- Type: Glider
- National origin: United States
- Manufacturer: Harland Ross
- Designer: Harland Ross
- Status: Sole example in the National Soaring Museum
- Primary users: Harland Ross Robert Storck
- Number built: One

History
- Manufactured: 1956
- First flight: 1956

The Ross R-6 is a tandem two-seat, high-wing glider that was designed by Harland Ross and first flown in 1956.

== Design and development ==
Ross designed the R-6 as a two-seat sailplane with the intention of setting new multi-place records with it. The aircraft was initially designed to use the same 55 ft (16.8 m) span wing as the highly successful Ross-Johnson RJ-5, but with a gross weight of 1,226 lb (556 kg) as opposed to the RJ-5's 850 lb (386 kg) this gave the R-6 one of the highest wing loadings for a glider of its day.

The R-6 was constructed with a metal fuselage, which was a departure from Ross's earlier designs. The passenger seat is behind the pilot's seat, aft of the wing spar and has no windows, visibility is provided by a removable plastic overhead dome. The wing features dive brakes. The wingspan was later increased to 60 ft (18.3 m), lowering the wing loading somewhat, but increasing the high aspect ratio to 28:1. Originally taking off from a dolly and landing on a fixed skid, the R-6 later had a retractable monowheel landing gear installed.

== Operational history ==
In one four-day period in 1958 Ross flew the R-6 to set four records. He set new World Record marks for the multi-place glider category in 100 km (62 mi), 200 km (124 mi) and 300 km (186 mi) speed triangles and also set a US National Record for out-and-return distance of 234.66 mi (377.65 km). Two of the three World Records exceeded the standing single-place record at the time.

In 1959, Ross flew the R-6 solo from Kent, Texas to Farley, New Mexico for his diamond distance and won the Barringer Trophy

The R-6 was later owned by Bob Storck of Waldorf, Maryland who loaned it to the National Soaring Museum, where it is currently listed as in storage.

== Aircraft on display ==
- National Soaring Museum - the sole example.

== Specifications (R-6 2-seater / single-seater) ==
Data from Sailplane directory and Soaring The World's Sailplanes:Die Segelflugzeuge der Welt:Les Planeurs du Monde Volume II

General characteristics

- Crew: 2 / 1
- Length: 24 ft 0 in (7.32 m)
- Wingspan: 55 ft 0 in (16.77 m)
- Height: 3 ft 10 in (1.17 m) at cockpit
- Wing area: 125.0 sq ft (11.61 m^{2})
- Aspect ratio: 24.2:1
- Airfoil: NACA 63_{2}615
- Empty weight: 646 lb (293 kg) - 2-seater, 601.9 lb (273 kg) - single-seater
- Gross weight: 1,226 lb (556 kg) - 2-seater, 1,053.8 lb (478 kg) - single-seater

Performance

- Stall speed: 54 mph (87 km/h, 47 kn)
- Never exceed speed: 152 mph (245 km/h, 132 kn)
- Rough air speed max: 112.5 mph (181.1 km/h; 97.8 kn)
- Aerotow speed: 112.5 mph (181.1 km/h; 97.8 kn)
- Winch launch speed: 103.8 mph (167.0 km/h; 90.2 kn)
- g limits: +4.4 -2.6
- Maximum glide ratio: 40:1 at 66.5 mph (107.0 km/h; 57.8 kn)
- Rate of sink: 135.0 ft/min (0.686 m/s) at 59 mph (95.0 km/h; 51.3 kn)
- Wing loading: 8.9 lb/sq ft (43.5 kg/m^{2}) - 2-seater, (7.39 lb/sqft) - single-seater

== See also ==
Related lists List of gliders
