= Advanced Soaring Concepts Spirit =

American glider

General information
- Type: Glider
- National origin: United States
- Manufacturer: Advanced Soaring Concepts
- Designer: Tor Jensen
- Status: Production completed
- Number built: 18

History
- Introduction date: 1992
- First flight: 1992
- Variants: Advanced Soaring Concepts Falcon

The Advanced Soaring Concepts Spirit, also called the Advanced Soaring Concepts American Spirit, is an American mid-wing, T-tailed. single-seat, FAI Standard Class glider that was designed by Tor Jensen and produced by Advanced Soaring Concepts, first flying in 1992. The aircraft was produced in kit form for amateur construction.

== Design and development ==
The Spirit was the Standard Class design that paralleled the company's FAI 15-Metre Class Falcon.

The aircraft is made from a welded steel tubing, with an Aramid reinforced cockpit section. Its 15 m (49.2 ft) span wing employs a Carbon-fiber-reinforced polymer spar and carbon sandwich construction. The kit came with pre-molded fiberglass parts. The cockpit was designed to accommodate a pilot of up to 76 in (193 cm) in height and weighing up to 260 lb (118 kg) with parachute.

== Specifications (Spirit) ==
Data from Purdy and Sailplane Directory

General characteristics

- Crew: one
- Wingspan: 49 ft 3 in (15 m)
- Wing area: 101.1 sq ft (9.39 m^{2})
- Aspect ratio: 23.9:1
- Empty weight: 508 lb (230 kg)
- Gross weight: 1,160 lb (526 kg)

Performance

- Stall speed: 44 mph (71 km/h, 38 kn)
- Maximum glide ratio: 44:1
- Wing loading: 11.47 lb/sq ft (56.0 kg/m^{2})

== See also ==
Related lists

- List of gliders
