= Applebay GA-II Chiricahua =

American glider

GA-II Chiricahua

General information
- Type: Glider
- National origin: United States
- Designer: George Applebay
- Status: Production completed
- Number built: one

History
- First flight: 1970

The Applebay GA-II Chiricahua is an American high-wing, single-seat, FAI Standard Class glider that was designed and constructed by George Applebay, first flying in 1970.

== Design and development ==
Applebay started the Chiricahua as a standard class sailplane in 1959, but the aircraft was not completed for 11 years, first flying in 1970. It was named for the Chiricahua people, a group of Apache Native Americans.

The aircraft is made from wood and covered in a combination of plywood and doped Ceconite. Its 15 m (49.2 ft) span wing employs a Göttingen 549 airfoil and features Schempp-Hirth style top surface airbrakes. As originally specified for the standard class, the landing gear was a fixed monowheel.

Only one example was built.

== Operational history ==
On 7 July 1974 at New River, Arizona the prototype, N9413, was involved in an accident and substantially damaged. The aircraft was on a soaring flight, ran out of lift, made an attempted landing on a road in a 20 kn (37 km/h) crosswind and struck a tree. The 24-year-old pilot, who had 32 hours of flying time total, including 11 hours on type, was not injured. The aircraft has since been re-registered as N53MB.

== Specifications (GA-II) ==
Data from Sailplane Directory

General characteristics

- Crew: one
- Length: 49 ft 3 in (15 m)
- Wing area: 148.2 sq ft (13.77 m^{2})
- Aspect ratio: 16.2:1
- Airfoil: Gottingen 549
- Empty weight: 590 lb (268 kg)
- Gross weight: 819 lb (371 kg)

Performance

- Wing loading: 5.47 lb/sq ft (26.7 kg/m^{2})

== See also ==
Related lists

- List of gliders
