= Johnson RHJ-6 Adastra =

American glider

RHJ-6 Adastra

General information
- Type: Glider
- National origin: United States
- Designer: Dick Johnson
- Status: In storage at the National Soaring Museum
- Primary user: Dick Johnson
- Number built: One

History
- First flight: 3 April 1960

The Johnson RHJ-6 Adastra (English: Star) was an American mid-wing, two-seat glider that was designed and constructed by Dick Johnson and first flown on 3 April 1960.

== Design and development ==
The Adastra was conceived by Johnson as a two-place competition aircraft. He completed and flew it in 1960.

The aircraft was of mixed construction. The fuselage was built from wood and was a monocoque design. The wing had a wooden structure, with fiberglass leading edge. The tail surfaces were constructed of wood. The wings aft of the leading edge, the tail surfaces and all control surfaces were covered with doped aircraft fabric.

Originally the aircraft employed an Eppler 150 airfoil section, but Johnson later modified it by adding a 10% wing chord extension, turning the airfoil into an Eppler 151. Later new wings were built with an Eppler 414 airfoil to improve low-speed performance. The new wings used a foam-filled fiberglass leading edge. The tail was originally a "Y" tail, but this was later replaced with a conventional tail, with a low-mounted tailplane.

The individual cockpits were covered with independent bubble canopies, although the aircraft was most often flown solo, with a flat hatch replacing the rear canopy to reduce aerodynamic drag. In 1983 it was reported that a single canopy was being designed for the aircraft.

Only one Adastra was built.

== Operational history ==
In its original configuration Johnson flew the Adastra in the 1960 World Gliding Championships in Cologne, West Germany and finished in 15th place. After extending the wing chord and altering the airfoil he flew it in the US Nationals to a seventh-place finish in 1961 and second place in 1962.

The aircraft was later owned by Jesse Womack of Graham, Texas. The Federal Aviation Administration registry records indicate that the aircraft was destroyed and was removed from the registry on 6 April 1992. The National Soaring Museum lists the aircraft as being part of their collection and in storage.

== Aircraft on display ==
- National Soaring Museum - listed as "in storage"

== Specifications (Adastra - later configuration) ==
Data from The World's Sailplanes:Die Segelflugzeuge der Welt:Les Planeurs du Monde Volume II

General characteristics

- Crew: One
- Capacity: One passenger
- Wingspan: 56 ft 4 in (17.17 m)
- Wing area: 178 sq ft (16.5 m^{2})
- Aspect ratio: 17:84
- Airfoil: Eppler 414
- Empty weight: 649 lb (294 kg)
- Gross weight: 1,040 lb (472 kg) when flown solo, 1,166 lb (529 kg) dual

Performance

- Stall speed: 36 mph (58 km/h, 31 kn)
- Never exceed speed: 140 mph (225 km/h, 121 kn)
- Rough air speed max: 120.5 mph (193.9 km/h; 104.7 kn)
- Aerotow speed: 120.5 mph (193.9 km/h; 104.7 kn)
- Winch launch speed: 80 mph (128.7 km/h; 69.5 kn)
- Terminal velocity: with full airbrakes 140 mph (225.3 km/h; 121.7 kn)
- Maximum glide ratio: 42.5:1 at 60.9 mph (98 km/h; 53 kn)
- Rate of sink: 120 ft/min (.61 m/s) at 57.2 mph (92 km/h; 50 kn)
- Wing loading: 5.8 lb/sq ft (28.5 kg/m^{2}) when flown solo, 6.96 lb/sq ft (34 kg/m^{2}) dual

== See also ==
Related lists

- List of gliders
