= SGL =

SGL may refer to:

- Same gender loving, an African-American term
- SGL Carbon, Germany
- SGL arena, Augsburg, Bavaria, Germany
- Pennsylvania State Game Lands
- Supergalactic longitude in the supergalactic coordinate system
- Sanglechi-Ishkashimi language, ISO 639-3 language code
- IATA code for Sangley Point Airport, Manila, Philippines
- Solar gravitational lens, a proposed method of using Sun's gravitational lensing as a large lens
- South Geelong railway station, Victoria, Australia, station code
- South Gyle railway station, station code
- Geographic Society of Lima, in Peru
- Southeast Gateway Line, Los Angeles County, California

== See also ==
- SGI (disambiguation)
- SG1 (disambiguation)
- SGML
