= Dick Johnson (glider pilot) =

American glider pilot

- Born: Richard H. Johnson; January 10, 1923; Medicine Hat, Alberta, Canada
- Died: July 23, 2008 (aged 85); Midlothian, Texas, United States
- Education: Mississippi State University
- Occupations: Aviator, Aeronautical engineer

Richard H. Johnson (January 10, 1923 – July 23, 2008) was a glider pilot, aeronautical engineer and prolific writer of articles for gliding magazines. He was an 11-time U.S. National Champion glider pilot, 9-time US Soaring Team pilot at the Soaring World Championships, held two World Gliding Records and is a member of the US Soaring Hall of Fame. He flew for 70 years and logged over 14,000 flying hours, including over 10,000 hours of non-powered flight time in sailplanes. He authored over 100 articles on soaring and flight tests of gliders.

== Early years ==
Dick Johnson was born on January 10, 1923, in Medicine Hat, Alberta, Canada. He grew up in Los Altos, California, where he learned the basics of flight and aerodynamics as a model airplane and glider enthusiast. He won the California State Hand-Launched Model Glider Championship in 1937.

In 1938, wanting to graduate to full-size aircraft, Johnson read Wolf Hirth's book The Art of Soaring Flight three times. Using a second-hand Northrup primary glider he purchased and being carefully towed by brother Dave driving a 1931 Model A Ford, he taught himself how to fly. Over a period of several months ground skims were gradually replaced by straight-ahead landings, S-turns, 180 degree turns, and finally 360 degree turn flights.

The following year Johnson and Dave purchased a Bowlus Baby Albatross intermediate glider kit, and assembled it in their spare time over fall, winter and spring of 1940. With his brother's assistance, they built a wooden trailer for the Baby Albatross glider, and towed the glider 3,000 miles to Elmira, New York, to enter the 1940 U.S. National Gliding Championships at age 17. As a self-taught pilot Johnson had not been licensed prior to this time, so before entering the contest he received a Private Glider Pilot license at Elmira and obtained a legal registration for his home-built Albatross. During the contest he earned his Silver C badge (badge #28), and placed 3rd overall in the contest.

== World War II Years ==
By 1941 Johnson owned a Schweizer SGS 2-8 2-seat metal intermediate training glider, had received his Commercial Glider Pilot license and gave flight instruction during weekends on Rosamond Dry Lake in the Mojave Desert of California. At the start of World War II, the U.S. Government took possession of his glider through the War Powers Act of 1941, and Johnson became a Civilian Glider Flight Instructor, training military glider pilots at 29 Palms Air Academy, California. Training was performed 24 hours a day, 7 days a week for 14 months, with Johnson flying two 6-hour shifts per day - one shift as a glider instructor and one shift as a tow plane pilot. After 14 months of training no additional glider pilots were needed and Johnson obtained a co-pilot position with Pan American World Airways, Pacific Division in Consolidated PBY-3, Martin 120 and Boeing 314 flying boats. He was later assigned to the Military Air Transport Service (MATS) flying PBM-3 and PB-2Y3s. Johnson remained active as the area wing commander of the World War II Glider Pilots Association into his 80s.

== The RJ-5 ==
The RJ-5 sailplane was one of the first to utilize a laminar flow airfoil, and the first to achieve a glide ratio of 40-to-1. In 1948 Johnson contracted with Harland Ross to design and build the glider (originally designated R-5). One key design decision was to use a NACA 63(2)-615 laminar flow airfoil selected by Dick Lyon. The NACA laminar airfoils were developed in secret during World War II, and subsequently released for public use after the war, but its use here was unproven because no sailplane had used such an airfoil before.

However, other obligations prevented Ross from completing the project within the contracted one year schedule, so Johnson took delivery of the partially completed sailplane in 1949. He completed the construction in 1950, and under the direction of Dr. August Raspet of the AeroPhysics Research Laboratory of Mississippi State University, where Johnson was an Aeronautical Engineering student, he measured the glide ratio performance of the initial design at 33-to-1. With the help of Dr. Raspet, Johnson made several modifications which in 1951 resulted in a better than 40 to 1 glide ratio - the first sailplane to achieve that milestone. At Dr. Raspet's suggestion, the name was changed to the RJ-5. Dick Johnson flew the RJ-5 to win the US Open Class Nationals in 1950, 51, 52 and 54, to break the World Distance Record in 1951 and to break the 100 km Triangle World Speed Record in 1952. The World Distance flight of 535 mi (861 km) from Odessa, Texas, to Salina, Kansas was the first glider flight to exceed 500 miles and broke the previous world record by 70 mi (113 km). This record held for 12 years, until broken by Al Parker in a Sisu 1A glider that used a more refined laminar flow airfoil.

The RJ-5 has been restored and is on display at the National Soaring Museum in Elmira, New York.

== Flight test evaluations ==
Dick Johnson wrote more than 100 articles for Soaring magazine, consisting mostly of the Flight Test Evaluation series starting in 1976, which measured the performance of sailplanes utilizing the measurement methods taught by Dr Raspet and refined by Johnson. Funded by the Dallas Gliding Association, which did not have any financial ties to sailplane manufacturers, Johnson's evaluations were considered an unbiased evaluation and were reprinted in multiple languages and collected into book form. In addition to measuring the sailplane performance as received, these evaluations documented opportunities for measurable performance improvements such as wing smoothing, improved wing seals, turbulator inducing strips, and deturbulator strips.

== Death ==
Dick Johnson died July 23, 2008, at age 85. He was flying a Ventus A glider from a Midlothian, Texas, airport when it crashed about 2.25 miles (3.5 km) from the airport after flying for some time. The Medical Examiner of Dallas County determined that Johnson died from the injuries he received in the crash. The National Transportation Safety Board determined the probable accident cause to be an incapacitating cardiac event, as Johnson had severe coronary artery disease with symptoms and had been prescribed medication for it.

== Gliding awards received ==
- F.A.I. Lilienthal Gliding Medal in 1986, the highest gliding award in the world
- F.A.I. Paul Tissandier Diploma in 1976- for serving the cause of aviation by work, initiative and devotion
- F.A.I. Klemperer Award and OSTIV Plaque (International Scientific and Technical Soaring Organization) in 1983 for contributions to international gliding sciences
- S.S.A Hall of Fame in 1956
- S.S.A. Warren E. Eaton Memorial Award in 1967 for outstanding contributions to the art, sport, or science of soaring flight in the U.S.A.
- S.S.A. Soaring Society of America Exceptional Service Award (1982)
- S.S.A Paul E. Tuntland Memorial Award in 1977, 1979, 1983, 2000 and 2007 for important contributions to the science of soaring flight
- S.S.A Larissa Stroukoff Memorial Trophy in 1975, 1981 and 1985 for the best speed in any task during the U.S. National Open Class Soaring Championship

== List of Gliding National Championships 1st Place Finishes ==
All are Open Class Nationals (i.e., Richard C. du Pont Memorial Trophy) unless otherwise noted

1. 1950, Grand Prairie, Texas, in RJ-5
2. 1951, Elmira, New York in RJ-5
3. 1952, Grand Prairie, Texas, in RJ-5
4. 1954, Elsinore, California, in RJ-5
5. 1959, Elmira, New York in Weihe
6. 1963, Elmira, New York in Skylark 4
7. 1964, McCook, Nebraska, in Skylark 4
8. 1974, (Standard Class Nationals), Hobbs, New Mexico, in PIK-20
9. 1975, Hobbs, New Mexico, in Nimbus 2
10. 1981, Ionia, Michigan, in Nimbus 2
11. 1985, Hutchison, Kansas, in Nimbus 3

== Participation on the US Soaring Team in the World Soaring Championships ==
1. 1952, Madrid, Spain, 24th place in RJ-5
2. 1960, Cologne, Germany, 15th place in Adastra
3. 1963, Argentina, in Sisu-1, 4th place
4. 1965, South Cerney, England, in Skylark 4, 18th place
5. 1968, Leszno, Poland, in HP-13, 8th place
6. 1970, Marfa, Texas, Team captain (non-flying role)
7. 1972, Vrsac, Yugoslavia, in ASW-17, 5th place
8. 1974, Waikerie, Australia, in ASW-17, 8th place
9. 1976, Rayskala, Finland, in Jantar 2A, 7th place
10. 1978, Châteauroux, France, in Jantar 2B, 6th place

== List of sailplanes owned ==
The following is a list of sailplanes owned by Dick Johnson in chronological order. These sailplanes cover much of the history of sailplane designs, from an early open fuselage "primary" glider to the modern composite designs.

1. Northrup Primary, purchased 2nd hand in 1938
2. Bowlus Baby Albatross, purchased as kit in 1939 and completed in 1940
3. Schweizer SGS 2-8, purchased in 1941 (US government took possession in 1942 under War Powers Act)
4. Bowlus Baby Albatross, purchased used from factory in 1942, destroyed in high-altitude flight in 1942
5. Tiny Mite, purchased partially constructed in 1947
6. RJ-5, Purchased partially completed in 1949 as R-5; modified to become the RJ-5
7. DFS Weihe, purchased in 1959
8. Johnson Adastra (J-6), Johnson designed, completed construction in 1960
9. Slingsby Skylark 4, purchased in 1963
10. Schreder HP-14, purchased as kit in 1965, completed in 1967
11. Schleicher ASW 17, purchased in 1973
12. Schempp-Hirth Nimbus 2, purchased in 1974
13. Eiri-Avion PIK-20, purchased in 1976
14. Schempp-Hirth Ventus A, purchased in 1980
15. Schempp-Hirth Nimbus 3, purchased in 1981

== Academic and professional achievements ==
- BS in Aeronautical Engineering from Mississippi State University in 1952
- MS in Aero Engineering from Stanford University in 1953

Employed as aeronautical engineer first at Chance Vought, then at Temco Aircraft from 1953 to 1961 before becoming Chief Aerodynamicist at Texas Instruments (TI) from 1961 to official retirement in 1993. Remained an active consultant to a variety of companies through 2008.

His projects were:

- Paveway Laser Guided Bomb (LGB)- At TI in 1964 Johnson was instrumental in developing the aeronautical solutions for the initial laser-guided bomb, the BOLT GBU-1, including the unique floating "birdie head" which provided a stable platform for the "smart bomb" guidance system. The "Bolt" was followed by the Paveway I and Paveway II family of laser-guided bombs. The success of the Paveway guided systems during the Vietnam War showed the advantages for surgical strike capabilities of a "smart bomb". Johnson received TI's Pat Haggerty Innovation Award for work on that project.
- High Speed Anti Radar Missile (HARM) 1973, involved in airframe development
- Javelin Anti-Tank Missile 1980, lead airframe development
- Joint Stand-Off Weapon (JSOW) unmanned military glider 1987, lead airframe development
- NLOS (Non Line of Sight) Weapon-lead airframe development
- Paveway III- GBU-24, GBU-27 and GBU-28 ("Bunker Buster")- lead airframe development

Posthumously received the Richard H. Johnson Technical Achievement Award from the Precision Strike Association at the PSA Technical Symposium in October 2009. This award was created in his name to recognize an individual from the public or private sector for outstanding personal technical achievement resulting in significant contribution to precision strike systems. The PSA's documentation for this award indicates that "Dick Johnson personally led the design or redesign of more precision strike airframes than any contemporary. In a number of conflicts over the past two decades, the majority of weapon airframes were Johnson's designs. His innovative designs, or copies of them, appear in nearly every nation's military where precision strike systems are employed."
