= Moore SS-1 =

American glider

SS-1

General information
- Type: Glider
- National origin: United States
- Designer: Arien C. Moore
- Status: sole example in the US Southwest Soaring Museum
- Primary user: Arien C. Moore
- Number built: One

History
- Introduction date: 1966
- First flight: 1966

The Moore SS-1 is an American high-wing, single seat, FAI Standard Class glider that was designed and constructed by Arien C. Moore of Sweet Home, Oregon.

== Design and development ==
Moore built the SS-1 over a period of just under three years, completing it in 1966, with assistance from his wife and son.

The SS-1 is of predominantly aluminium construction, with the wing partly covered with sheet aluminium and partly with doped aircraft fabric covering. The aircraft also has some fiberglass fairings. The entire aircraft is flush riveted, except the aft fuselage. The cantilever semi-tapered wing is of a 48.1 ft (14.7 m) span and employs a NACA 65-618 airfoil. The wing features DFS-style dive brakes. The landing gear is a fixed monowheel that is faired. The cockpit canopy is optional and the aircraft can be flown open cockpit.

The aircraft cost just under US$3000 to complete in 1966. It was donated to the US Southwest Soaring Museum, where it is on display.

== Operational history ==
The SS-1 was featured on the cover of the Soaring Society of America's January 1974 issue of Soaring Magazine.

The builder made several flights to 18,000 ft (5,486 m) and as far as 200 mi (321.9 km) in the SS-1.

== Aircraft on display ==
- US Southwest Soaring Museum

== Specifications (SS-1) ==
Data from Sailplane Directory and Soaring

General characteristics

- Crew: one
- Wingspan: 48.1 ft (14.7 m)
- Wing area: 121 sq ft (11.2 m^{2})
- Aspect ratio: 20:1
- Airfoil: NACA 65-618
- Empty weight: 486 lb (220 kg)
- Gross weight: 690 lb (313 kg)

Performance

- Maximum glide ratio: 30:1 at 60 mph (97 km/h)
- Rate of sink: 132 ft/min (0.67 m/s) at 50 mph (80 km/h)
- Wing loading: 5.7 lb/sq ft (28 kg/m^{2})

== See also ==
Related lists

- List of gliders
