= SGI =

SGI may refer to:

== Companies ==
- Saskatchewan Government Insurance
- Scientific Games International, a gambling company
- Silicon Graphics, Inc., a former manufacturer of high-performance computing products
- Silicon Graphics International, formerly Rackable Systems, which acquired the former Silicon Graphics, Inc.
- Smoking Gun Interactive, a video game company
- Synthetic Genomics, Inc., an alternative fuels company

== Other uses ==
- Saanich-Gulf Islands, a federal electoral district in British Columbia, Canada
- Silicon Graphics Image, a graphics file format for Silicon Graphics workstations
- Soka Gakkai International, a Nichiren Buddhist movement and also a non-governmental organization (NGO)
- SGI, the IATA code for Mushaf Airbase in Pakistan
- Stargate Infinity, an animated television series
- Spheroidal graphite iron, another name for ductile iron
- Sustainable Governance Indicators, statistics measuring the need for reform among Organisation for Economic Co-operation and Development countries

== See also ==
- SG1 (disambiguation)
- SGL (disambiguation)
