= Kent, Texas =

Ghost town in Culberson County, Texas, United States

- Ghost town
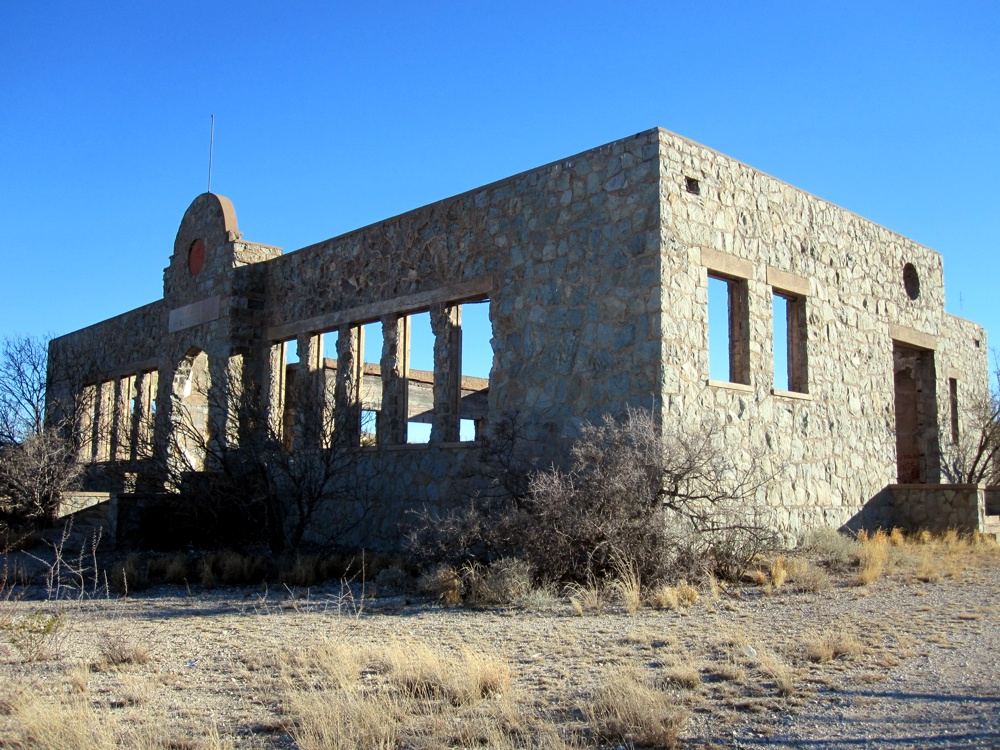
- Ruins of Kent Public School, January 2010

- Location within Texas Location within the United States
- Coordinates: 31°04′09″N 104°13′02″W
- Country: United States
- State: Texas
- County: Culberson
- Elevation: 4,206 ft (1,282 m)

Population (2000)
  - Total: 60
- Time zone: UTC-6 (Central (CST))
  - Summer (DST): UTC-5 (CDT)
- ZIP code: 79855
- Area code: 432

Kent is a ghost town in Culberson County, Texas, United States. According to the Handbook of Texas, the community had a population of 60 in 2000.

== History ==
Due to the abundance of antelope, the area was named Antelope when it was first established before 1892. In Kent, a post office was founded in 1892, but it was never operational. The next year, a second post office was established, and John Charles Rickli was appointed postmaster. In Kent, there were two cattle enterprises in 1896. There were four cattle breeders, a general store, and an estimated 25 people living in the town by 1914. Beginning in 1924 and lasting for 40 years, the estimated population was 50. In 1960, the post office closed. Kent had four companies and a population of 65 in the late 1960s. The town's estimated population dropped to 60 by the middle of the 1970s, and it stayed there until 2000 when there were six businesses.

The X Ranch in Kent was associated with a controversy within the racehorse industry. Sugar Bars, an American Quarter Horse, had a sire named Three Bars. Frontera Sugar, his dam, had some controversy attached to her breeding. Her breeder later registered Frontera Sugar's dam as Palomino DO, but the American Quarter Horse Association (AQHA) has never gotten this correction into their records. Palomino DO was registered in 1947 with the number 8353. Her breeding was given as by a son of Ben Hur, and out of a Reynolds Brothers mare. This is not the Reynolds that bred Frontera Sugar, but rather the Reynolds Brothers that owned the X Ranch.

In 1959, the Ross R-6 flew solo from Kent to Farley, New Mexico, for Harland Ross' diamond distance and won the Barringer Trophy. This flight completed his Diamond badge, which was No. 14 in the US.

== Geography ==
Kent is located at the crossroads of Interstate 10, Interstate 20, Texas State Highway 118, and Farm to Market Road 2424 on the Missouri Pacific Railroad, 36 mi (58 km) east of Van Horn, 152 mi (245 km) east of El Paso, and 81 mi (130 km) west of Fort Stockton in southeastern Culberson County.

=== Climate ===
According to the Köppen climate classification, Kent has a semiarid climate, abbreviated BSk on climate maps.

== Education ==
Kent's school closed in 1961. Today, the community is served by the Culberson County-Allamoore Independent School District.

== See also ==
- List of unincorporated communities in Texas
- 1939 general re-description of highway system (Texas)
- Texas State Highway 233
