= Applebay Zia =

American motorglider

Zia

General information
- Type: Motor glider
- National origin: United States
- Manufacturer: Applebay Sailplanes
- Designer: George Applebay
- Status: No longer in production
- Number built: 4

History
- Introduction date: 1983
- First flight: 1982

The Applebay Zia is an American, single-seat, high-wing, twin-boom, pusher configuration motor glider that was designed by George Applebay for the 1982 Sailplane Homebuilders Association Homebuilt Sailplane Design Contest. The aircraft was intended to be offered as a factory completed aircraft or as a kit. It first flew in 1982.

== Design and development ==
Even though the Zia was designed for the 1982 Sailplane Homebuilders Association Homebuilt Sailplane Design Contest, it was withdrawn from the competition as it required changes during the contest period, which the rules prohibited. In fact the design that was to become the Zia went through six different configurations, starting as a canard. The aircraft is named for the Zia people.

The Zia is constructed from fiberglass with a carbon fiber wing spar. The aircraft has fixed tricycle gear featuring wheel pants. The specified engine is the 28 hp (21 kW) Rotax 277 two-stroke, which is started with a manual recoil starter. The aircraft has flaps which deploy to 45° and retract anytime the flap handle is released, intentionally preventing the use of flaps and throttle at the same time. Fuel is 4 U.S. gallons (15 L) carried in the left wing root tank.

The Zia was placed in series production in the fall of 1983 but only four were completed, including the prototype. The design was not type certified and all examples produced were registered in the Experimental category

== Operational history ==
In March 2011 there were still two Zias registered in the US, including one owned by the designer.

== Aircraft on display ==
- US Southwest Soaring Museum

== Specifications (Zia) ==
Data from Sailplane Directory and Soaring

General characteristics

- Crew: one
- Wingspan: 46 ft 0 in (14.02 m)
- Wing area: 118 sq ft (11.0 m^{2})
- Aspect ratio: 18:1
- Airfoil: Wortmann FX 66-197
- Empty weight: 400 lb (181 kg)
- Gross weight: 650 lb (295 kg)
- Fuel capacity: 4 U.S. gallons (15 L)
- Powerplant: 1 × Rotax 277 , 28 hp (21 kW)

Performance

- Maximum glide ratio: 25:1
- Rate of sink: 120 ft/min (0.61 m/s)
- Wing loading: 5.5 lb/sq ft (27 kg/m^{2})

== See also ==
- List of gliders
