= Applebay Sailplanes =

American glider manufacturer

- Company type: Privately held company
- Industry: Aerospace
- Predecessor: Aero Tek
- Founded: circa 1978
- Founder: George Applebay
- Fate: Defunct circa 1984
- Headquarters: Albuquerque, New Mexico, United States
- Products: Sailplanes, motor gliders
- Owner: George Applebay

Applebay Sailplanes was an American aircraft manufacturer, founded by George Applebay and based in Albuquerque, New Mexico. The company specialized in the design and manufacture of sailplanes in the form of ready-to-fly type certified aircraft, as well as some experimental types.

== History ==
George Applebay's first sailplane design constructed was the Applebay GA-II Chiricahua, a wood and fabric glider for the FAI Standard Class that first flew in 1970. Only one Chiricahua was built. In 1975 he flew the prototype Applebay GA-111 Mescalero, a mixed metal and fiberglass FAI Open Class glider. The Mescalero was intended for production, but Applebay decided to concentrate on his next design, the all-fiberglass Zuni for the 15m class instead and only one Mescalero was completed. The Zuni was designed in 1975.

Flight testing of the Zuni started in November 1976 and the aircraft was put into production by a new company Applebay formed for the purpose called Aero Tek. The aircraft was quite competitive in 1976 and placed well in regional competitions. A fatal accident, as a result of a structural failure, in May 1977 forced Aero Tek out of business in 1978, but a new company was formed to continue Zuni production, Applebay Sailplanes. The improved Zuni II, with Kevlar construction was introduced, but production ended in 1983 after only 20 Zunis in total had been completed, due to the lack of competitiveness of the design by that date and the high US dollar, that made competition with European imports difficult.

The Applebay Zia twin-boom motor glider was introduced in 1983 but only four were built, including the prototype.

In 2000, George Applebay was inducted into the Soaring Hall of Fame and went on to found the US Southwest Soaring Museum in Moriarty, New Mexico, which was conceived in 1995 and opened in 2006. Applebay died in April 2015 at age 89.

== Aircraft ==
Summary of aircraft built by Applebay Sailplanes
Model name	First flight	Number built	Type
Applebay Zuni	1977	20	15 metre class sailplane
Applebay Zia	1983	4	motor glider
