= Glasflügel 401 =

German single-seat glider, 1968

401 Kestrel
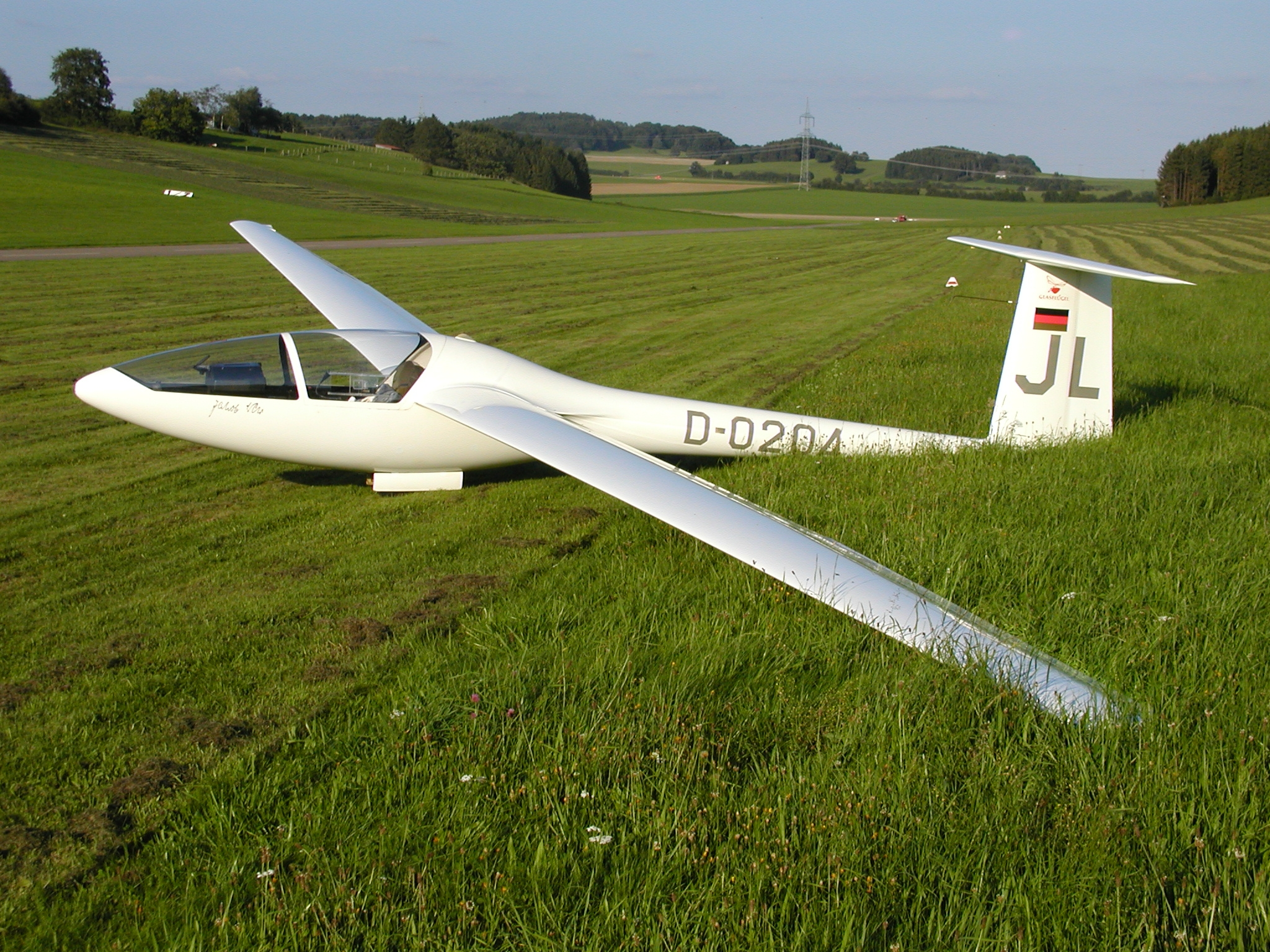
- Glasflügel 401 Kestrel

General information
- Type: Open class sailplane
- National origin: Germany
- Manufacturer: Glasflügel
- Designer: Eugen Hänle
- Number built: 129

History
- First flight: 9 August 1968

The Glasflügel 401 "Kestrel" is a glider that was developed in 1968 for the open class. It has a wingspan of 17 metres. It is named after the kestrel bird.

== History ==
Between 1968 and 1975 Glasflügel built 129 Kestrels.

The British company Slingsby built the Kestrel under license as the T59 and T59B. The T59B has a wingspan of 19 metres and was developed for the 1970 World Gliding Championships.

On 18 May 2005, Gordon Boettger flew 2061 km in his Kestrel in lee waves along the Sierra Nevada in the USA.

== Specifications ==
General characteristics

- Crew: One pilot
- Length: 6.72 m (22 ft 1 in)
- Wingspan: 17.00 m (55 ft 9 in)
- Wing area: 11.6 m^{2} (125 sq ft)
- Aspect ratio: 25
- Empty weight: 260 kg (570 lb)
- Gross weight: 400 kg (880 lb)

Performance

- Maximum speed: 250 km/h (160 mph, 140 kn)
- Maximum glide ratio: 43:1

== See also ==
Related development

- Slingsby Kestrel

Aircraft of comparable role, configuration, and era

- Schleicher ASW 12
- Schempp-Hirth Cirrus
- SZD-38 Jantar 1

Related lists

- List of gliders
