= Ross-Johnson RJ-5 =

American glider

RJ-5

General information
- Type: Glider
- National origin: United States
- Manufacturer: Harland Ross and Dick Johnson
- Designer: Harland Ross
- Status: Sole example in the National Soaring Museum
- Primary user: Dick Johnson
- Number built: One

History
- Manufactured: 1948-50
- Introduction date: 1950
- First flight: 1950

The Ross-Johnson RJ-5 is a single seat competition glider that was designed by Harland Ross and constructed partially by Ross and finished by Dick Johnson. The RJ-5 became one of the most famous gliders ever built when Johnson flew it 535 mi (861 km) in 1951, setting a new world distance record that endured for 13 years.

== Design and development ==
The RJ-5 was conceived by Johnson, who contracted Ross to design and built a glider with record-setting performance. The aircraft utilizes a NACA 63 (2)-615 laminar flow airfoil and was one of the first gliders to achieve a 40:1 glide ratio.

Johnson asked Ross to build the RJ-5 in 1948. Ross completed the design work and much of the construction, with help from Stan Hall, but by 1950 the glider was still incomplete. Johnson took delivery of it, finishing work on it at Mississippi State University, and incorporated some design changes of his own.

The fuselage and tail were built from wood, with all-metal wings. The RJ-5 was designed to use a take-off dolly and land on its fixed skid. Johnson sold the aircraft to Graham Thompson, who in turn sold it to Brad Strauss. While Strauss owned it the aircraft was damaged and Strauss had Adrian Kisovec design a new metal fuselage and tail for the aircraft, after which it was designated the RJK-5, acknowledging Kisovec's contributions. The aircraft was later sold to Dietrich Ennult and Rolf Bayer who modified it with a retractable monowheel landing gear from a Schweizer 1-34 and dive brakes, which somewhat lowered the performance. They subsequently donated it to the National Soaring Museum, who have since restored it to RJ-5 configuration with a new fuselage.

Only a single example was ever built and the aircraft is classified as an experimental amateur-built. Originally registered as N3722C, the registration was later changed to N79T.

== Operational history ==
Johnson took the newly completed RJ-5 to the US Nationals in 1950 and won the championship, a feat he duplicated with the aircraft in 1951, 1952 and 1954. He also set a US national distance to a declared goal record of 317 mi (510 km), a US National distance record of 363 mi (584 km), a 100 km (62 mi) triangle speed record of 52.8 mph (85 km/h) and the world distance record of 535 mi (861 km).

After Graham Thompson purchased the aircraft from Johnson he placed second in the 1956 US Nationals flying the RJ-5. The next owner, Brad Strauss loaned it to Bernie Carris, who came in second in both the 1960 and 1963 US Nationals, the aircraft having been rebuilt into the RJK-5 by the second competition. Carris's second-place finish in 1963 was just 8 points behind the aircraft's former owner, Dick Johnson, who was flying a Slingsby Skylark 4.

== Aircraft on display ==
- National Soaring Museum - the sole example, restored to RJ-5 configuration.

== Specifications (RJK-5) ==
Data from Soaring

General characteristics

- Crew: one
- Wingspan: 55 ft 0 in (16.76 m)
- Wing area: 125 sq ft (11.6 m^{2})
- Aspect ratio: 24.2
- Airfoil: NACA 63 (2)-615
- Empty weight: 650 lb (295 kg)
- Gross weight: 850 lb (386 kg)

Performance

- Maximum glide ratio: 37:1 at 53 mph
- Rate of sink: 120 ft/min (0.61 m/s) at 47 mph
- Wing loading: 6.8 lb/sq ft (33 kg/m^{2})

== See also ==
- List of gliders

Aircraft of comparable role, configuration, and era

- Oldershaw O-2
