= Applebay Zuni =

American glider

General information
- Type: Glider
- National origin: United States of America
- Manufacturer: Applebay Sailplanes
- Designer: George Applebay
- Number built: 20

History
- First flight: November 1976

The Applebay Zuni and Zuni II are single-seat, water-ballasted gliders designed to compete in the FAI 15m class.

In February 2015 the New Mexico State Legislature named the Zuni the Official State Glider.

== Design and development ==
The Soaring Society of America announced a sailplane design competition, in 1970, with the intention of giving American glider pilots the opportunity to fly competitive American designed and built aircraft in International competitions. George Applebay designed the Applebay Mescalero Open class glider for this competition, but the closing date passed long before the aircraft was ready. This competition stimulated George into designing a fibre-glass FAI 15m Class glider which emerged as the Zuni. The aircraft is named for the Zuni people.

The Applebay Zuni, and the later refined Applebay Zuni II, as American designed gliders, were intended to compete with European fibre-glass gliders that have dominated 15m class competitions since the class was established.

The Zuni was built using glass-fibre/epoxy resin composite materials, with particular attention to achieving laminar flow. Using the classic pod and boom layout developed by the German glider manufacturers, the Zuni uses a modified Wortmann 67 series aerofoil section in a relatively thin double taper wing, (19% at the root to relieve bending moments, rapidly thinning to 15% 0.9m outboard, 14% at the taper intersection and 13% at the tip) which is high set on the fuselage with 1^{o} dihedral, (reducing drag from interference of the wing fuselage junction). The integrally moulded fin supports the slightly swept all-moving T-tail, with a small degree of reflex camber and a partially mass-balanced rudder. The mono-wheel main undercarriage is manually retractable and a faired tailskid supports the rear fuselage on the ground. Water ballast is carried in integral tanks housed inside the leading edges of the wings, holding 219.8 litre (58 gal) 220 kg (484 lb). Conventional control surfaces were fitted, with pitch and roll controlled by a sidestick, and rudder by pedals. The entire trailing edge consists of flaps inboard, out to about 2/3 span with ailerons outboard which also drooped when the flaps were deployed.

Flight testing commenced in November 1976 with excellent results which generated much interest from the American gliding community which encouraged Applebay to start production by Aero Tek. Competition successes quickly showed that the Zuni was at least the equal of European built contenders, but the early success was marred by a fatal accident, in May 1977, caused by structural failure. Aero Tek was forced out of business in 1978 but Applebay continued to develop the Zuni by forming a new company Applebay Sailplanes.

After initial production George Applebay announced the Zuni II, with improved control, performance and lighter structure, introducing Kevlar (aramid fibre/epoxy) main spars and carbon-fibre (Carbon-fibre/epoxy), in varying quantities as production continued, for wing structure and main undercarriage doors. The Kevlar spar was built in cooperation with DuPont and saved over 70 lb in the weight of the aircraft compared to traditional fiberglass layups of the time. Other changes included a dihedral increase to 2^{o}, tighter tolerances on the aileron control circuit, re-positioned mainwheel to improve ground handling, orthodox control stick to remove unwanted roll during high g manoeuvres, as well as a redesigned cockpit with forward opening canopy on parallel linkages.

Interest in the Zuni II was lacklustre, due to the lack of competitiveness, as well as the poor currency exchange rates of the early 1980s which allowed European gliders to be imported at lower prices than equivalent American goods. Total production of all Zuni aircraft reached 20 by the time production terminated in 1983.

== Operational history ==
Modest success in National competitions was repeated in world class competition, but legal issues over an early structural failure and the low level of investment prevented the Zuni from achieving its full potential. American glider pilots quickly rejected the Zuni for world class competition, but three Zuni II aircraft were leased by the Polish gliding team to represent Poland in the 1983 World Gliding Championships, with modest results.

In 1982, over Taos, New Mexico, Jerry G. Mercer acquired all of his Silver C (3) Gold (3) and two Diamond FAI gliding badges during one flight in a Zuni II, an accomplishment that had never been done before. After the record flight the Zuni II with a total flight time of 56 hours was donated to the Smithsonian Air and Space Museum.

In 2009, Steve Leonard flew his Zuni II to first place in the Region 10 South Sports Class contest at Brenham, Texas

As of March 2015, 14 Zunis continue to be listed on the US Federal Aviation Administration aircraft registry.

== Aircraft on display ==
- National Air and Space Museum - Zuni II

== Specifications (Zuni II) ==
Data from Sailplane Directory

General characteristics

- Crew: 1
- Length: 21 ft 8 in (6.604 m)
- Wingspan: 49 ft 3 in (15 m)
- Height: 5 ft 0 in (1.524 m)
- Wing area: 109 sq ft (10.13 m^{2})
- Aspect ratio: 22
- Airfoil: Wortmann FX 67-K-170 inboard, modified FX 67-K-150 outboard
- Empty weight: 535 lb (238 kg)
- Gross weight: 1,200 lb (544 kg) inc 483lb (220kg) water ballast

Performance

- Maximum speed: 133 kn (153 mph, 246 km/h)
- Maximum glide ratio: 38@ 98 km/h (61 mph)
- Rate of sink: 108 ft/min (0.55 m/s)
- Wing loading: 11.01 lb/sq ft (53.7 kg/m^{2})

== See also ==
- List of Gliders
