= Advanced Soaring Concepts Apex =

Remotely-piloted research sailplane

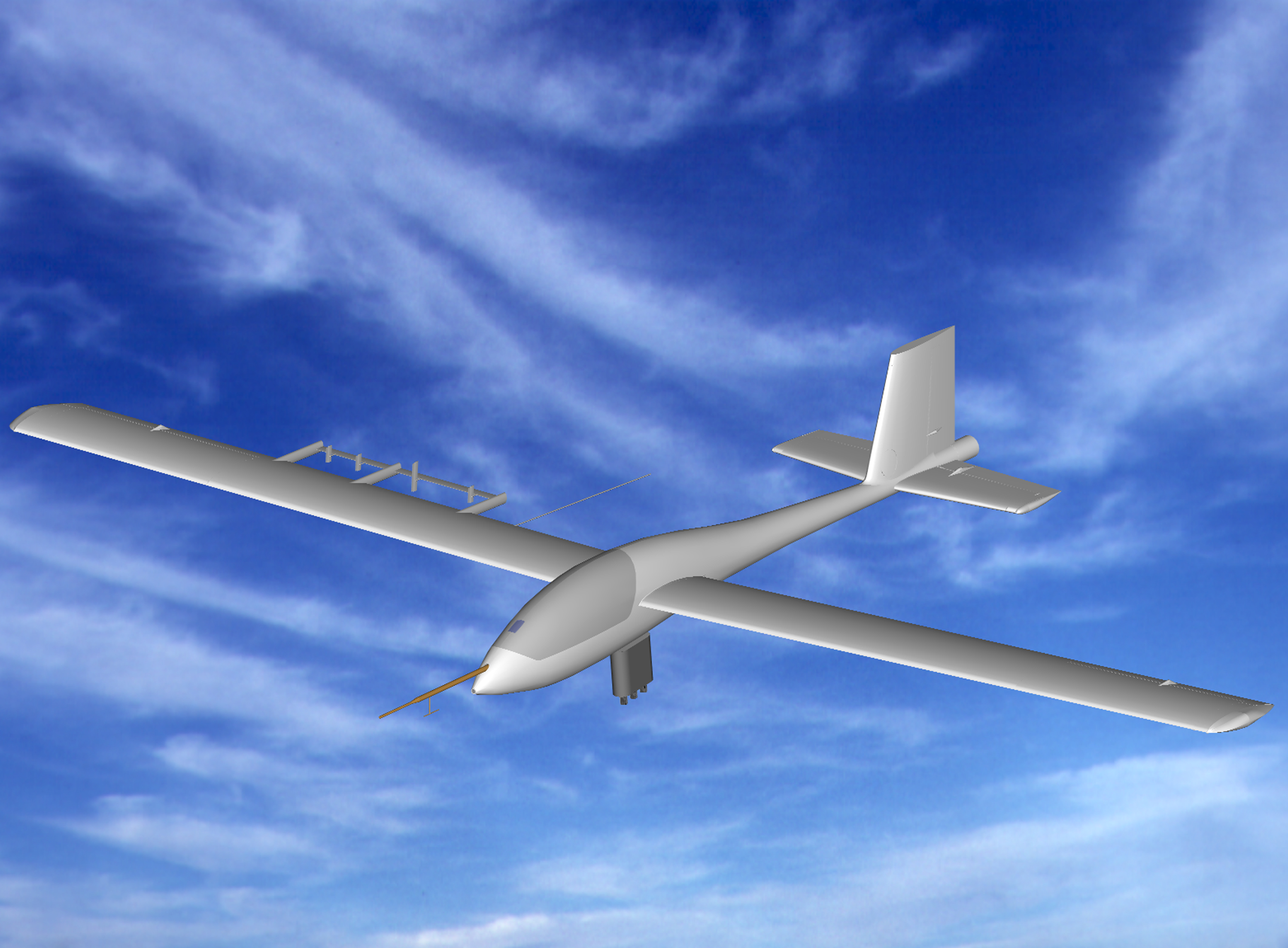
- Computer-generated image of the Apex high-altitude research sailplane

General information
- Type: Experimental high-altitude research sailplane
- Manufacturer: Advanced Soaring Concepts
- Status: Canceled
- Primary user: NASA
- Number built: 0

History
- First flight: Project canceled before flight

The Advanced Soaring Concepts Apex was a remotely piloted, high-altitude research sailplane developed by Advanced Soaring Concepts in collaboration with NASA's Dryden Flight Research Center (now Armstrong Flight Research Center). The project aimed to study aerodynamic phenomena in the upper atmosphere, particularly at altitudes around 100,000 feet (30,480 meters), to inform the design of future high-altitude aircraft and potential Mars exploration vehicles.

== Design and development ==
The Apex was based on a modified Schweizer SGS 1-36 sailplane, extensively redesigned to withstand the rigors of high-altitude flight. The airframe incorporated graphite/epoxy and boron/epoxy composites to achieve the necessary strength-to-weight ratio.

A distinctive feature of the Apex was its custom-designed wing, utilizing the "APEX-16" airfoil developed by Dr. Mark Drela of the Massachusetts Institute of Technology. This airfoil was optimized for stable flight in the low-density, low-Reynolds-number conditions of the upper atmosphere.

The sailplane measured approximately 22.7 feet (6.9 meters) in length with a wingspan of 41.2 feet (12.6 meters) and a wing aspect ratio of 13.6. It was designed for a target gross weight of 600 pounds (272 kilograms) and a 5-g maneuver load factor.

== Mission profile ==
The planned mission profile involved lifting the Apex to an altitude of about 105,000 feet (32,000 meters) using a high-altitude balloon. Upon release, the sailplane would descend nose-down, transitioning to horizontal flight with the assistance of a small rocket motor. Once stabilized, it would conduct a series of aerodynamic measurements during its glide back to lower altitudes.

Instrumentation included a "wake rake" mounted behind the wing to measure drag and other aerodynamic parameters. Data collected would have contributed to the validation of computational models for high-altitude flight and the development of future aircraft operating in similar conditions.

== Project status ==
Initially scheduled for flight tests in 1998, the Apex project faced multiple delays due to technical challenges. By January 1999, the aircraft was under construction, with delivery to NASA's Dryden Flight Research Center anticipated in March or April. However, the project was mothballed before completion.

The program saw a brief revival in 2000 but was ultimately canceled. Subsequent high-altitude research objectives were achieved through other NASA projects, such as the Helios solar-powered aircraft, which reached altitudes exceeding 96,000 feet (29,260 meters) in 2001.

== See also ==
- Advanced Soaring Concepts
- NASA Armstrong Flight Research Center
- High-altitude platform station
- Mars aircraft
