= Scanlan SG-1A =

American glider

SG-1A
- SG-1A over desert

General information
- Type: Glider
- National origin: United States
- Designer: Thomas W. Scanlan
- Number built: 5 (estimated)

History
- Introduction date: 1970
- First flight: 1970

The Scanlan SG-1A is an American, single seat, pod-and-boom, high-wing, strut-braced glider that was designed by Thomas W. Scanlan in 1970 and sold in the form of plans for amateur construction.

== Design and development ==
The SG-1 was conceived as a very simple and economical aircraft that could be built with modest construction skills and very little financial investment. The prototype was completed in 1970 for US$400 and subsequent aircraft were built for under US$1000.

The SG-1 is constructed with a welded steel fuselage and tail surfaces and covered with doped aircraft fabric. The wing is made from an aluminium structure, covered in aluminum sheet and features upper-surface spoilers and a modified Gö 549 airfoil. The landing gear is a monowheel with the forward fuselage protected by a skid. The airframe was static tested to 9g without failing.

With a very low stall speed of 32 mph (51 km/h), pilots who have flown the aircraft claim that the SG-1 can fly a thermal inside a Schweizer SGS 1-26.

== Operational history ==
In April 2011 there was one SG-1 and one SG-1A on the Federal Aviation Administration registry.

== Variants ==
SG-1
Prototype design, with V-struts and a constant-chord wing. One built.
SG-1A
Improved model, with double-tapered wings and single wing struts. About four built.

== Aircraft on display ==
- US Southwest Soaring Museum

== Specifications (SG-1A) ==
Data from Sailplane Directory and Soaring

General characteristics

- Crew: one
- Wingspan: 40 ft 0 in (12.19 m)
- Wing area: 125 sq ft (11.6 m^{2})
- Aspect ratio: 15.4:1
- Airfoil: modified Gö 549
- Empty weight: 300 lb (136 kg)
- Gross weight: 550 lb (249 kg)

Performance

- Stall speed: 32 mph (51 km/h, 28 kn)
- Never exceed speed: 100 mph (160 km/h, 87 kn)
- Maximum glide ratio: 20:1 at 55 mph (89 km/h)
- Rate of sink: 180 ft/min (0.91 m/s) at 47 mph (76 km/h)
- Wing loading: 4.4 lb/sq ft (21 kg/m^{2})

== See also ==
- List of gliders
