= Applebay GA-111 Mescalero =

American glider

GA-111 Mescalero

General information
- Type: Glider
- National origin: United States
- Designer: George Applebay
- Status: Prototype only completed
- Number built: One

History
- Manufactured: 1975
- Introduction date: 1975
- First flight: January 1975

The Applebay GA-111 Mescalero is an American high-wing, T-tailed single-seat, FAI Open Class glider that was designed by George Applebay.

== Design and development ==
The Mescalero was designed by Applebay in response to the Soaring Society of America's 1970 Sailplane Design Competition. The competition was aborted and the glider was not completed until January 1975. The aircraft is named for the Mescalero Apache tribe.

The Mescalero is of predominantly composite construction, with the wing constructed from metal and fiberglass and the fuselage and tail all a fiberglass monocoque structure. The 72 ft (21.9 m) wing is built in two pieces, has a very high aspect ratio of 36:1 and employs a Wortmann airfoil. The aircraft can be assembled from its trailer in just ten minutes using special ground handling stands that eliminate the need to lift the large wings by hand. All control surfaces are 100% mass balanced and feature automatic connections upon assembly.

The sole Mescalero completed was intended as a prototype for mass production and was registered in the Exhibition/Racing category. Applebay decided not to put the aircraft into production and concentrated on the FAI 15 metre Class Zuni instead, which did enter production.

== Operational history ==
In November 2012 the aircraft was still on the Federal Aviation Administration registry and based in Fort Worth, Texas. Originally registered as N100AT it is now registered as N64AT.

== Specifications (GA-111) ==
Data from Sailplane Directory and Soaring

General characteristics

- Crew: One
- Wingspan: 72 ft 0 in (21.95 m)
- Wing area: 146 sq ft (13.6 m^{2})
- Aspect ratio: 36:1
- Airfoil: Wortmann
- Empty weight: 1,000 lb (454 kg)
- Gross weight: 1,500 lb (680 kg)

Performance

- Maximum glide ratio: 44:1

== See also ==
- T-41 Mescalero (Different aircraft with same nickname)

Aircraft of comparable role, configuration, and era

- Neukom Elfe
- Schempp-Hirth Cirrus

Related lists

- List of gliders
