= Advanced Soaring Concepts Falcon =

American glider

Falcon

General information
- Type: Glider
- National origin: United States
- Manufacturer: Advanced Soaring Concepts
- Designer: Tor Jensen
- Status: Production completed

History
- First flight: 1993
- Variants: Advanced Soaring Concepts Spirit

The Advanced Soaring Concepts Falcon, also called the Advanced Soaring Concepts American Falcon, is an American mid-wing, T-tailed, single-seat, FAI 15-Metre Class glider that was designed by Tor Jensen and produced by Advanced Soaring Concepts, and first flew in 1993. The aircraft was produced as a kit for amateur construction.

== Design and development ==
The Falcon was designed by Jensen as the 15-metre class version of the FAI Standard Class Spirit.

The aircraft is made predominantly from fiberglass sandwiches, with the wing spar made from carbon-fiber-reinforced polymer. The cockpit is made from welded steel tube, reinforced with Aramid. Its 15 m (49.2 ft) span wing has optional extensions that bring the span to 18 m (59.1 ft). Glidepath control is via full span trailing edge flaps, coupled with top surface Schempp-Hirth-style airbrakes. The flaps can be set to +15°, +10°, +5°, 0°, and -5° in flight. The cockpit was designed to accommodate a pilot of up to 76 in (193 cm) in height and weighing up to 260 lb (118 kg) with parachute. The landing gear is a retractable monowheel.

== Specifications (Falcon) ==
Data from Sailplane Directory and EAA

General characteristics

- Crew: one
- Wingspan: 49 ft 3 in (15.0 m)
- Empty weight: 580 lb (263 kg)

Performance

- Stall speed: 38 mph (61 km/h, 33 kn) in landing configuration
- Never exceed speed: 167 mph (269 km/h, 145 kn)
- g limits: -3/+6
- Maximum glide ratio: 44:1

== See also ==
Related lists

- List of gliders
