= Slingsby Kestrel =

British single-seat glider, 1970

T.59 Kestrel
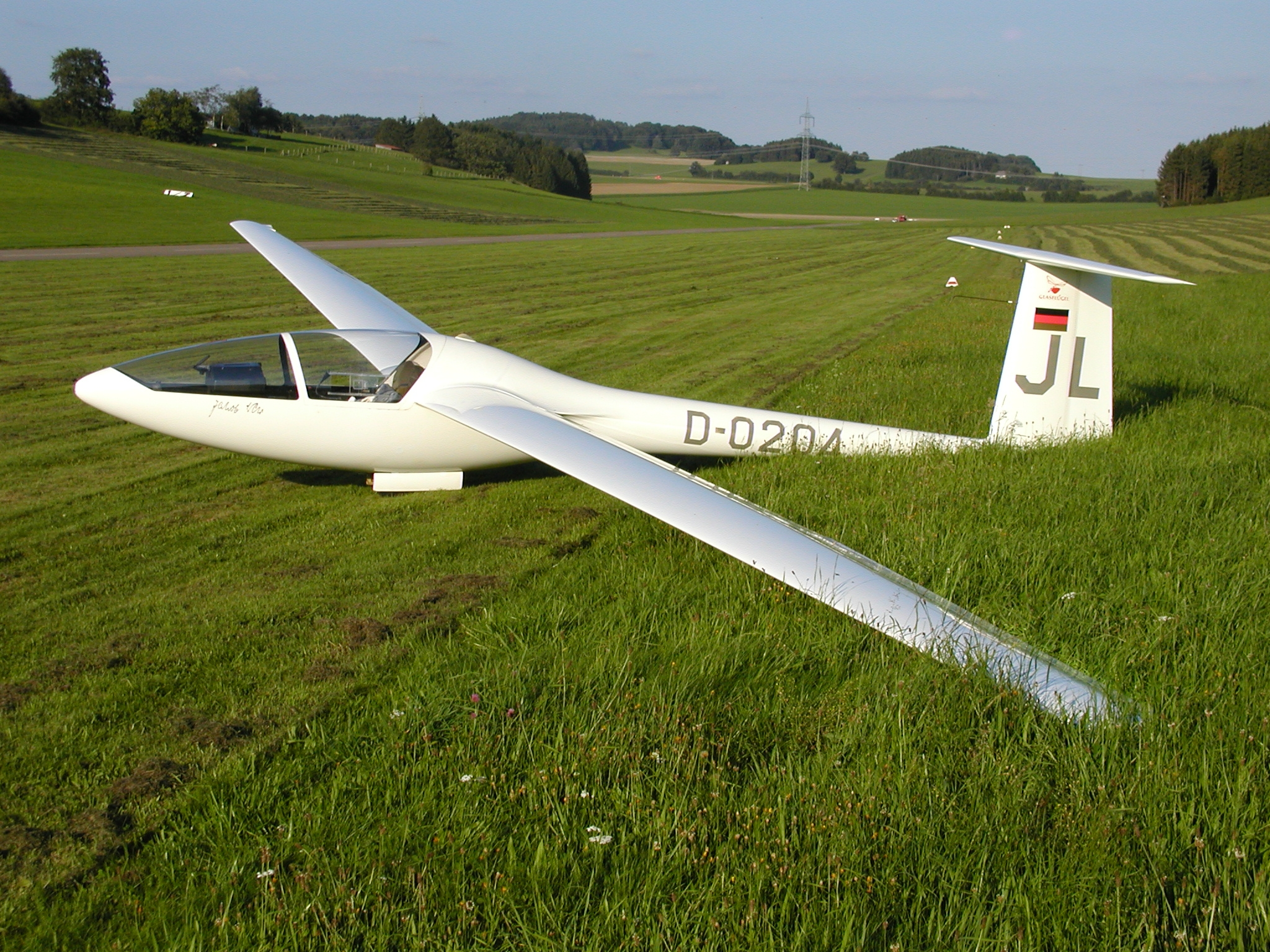
- Glasflügel 401, the pattern aircraft type for the first five T.59 Kestrels

General information
- Type: FAI Open Class sailplane
- National origin: United Kingdom
- Manufacturer: Slingsby Sailplanes
- Designer: Eugen Hänle
- Number built: 105

History
- Introduction date: April 1971
- First flight: August 1970
- Developed from: Glasflügel 401

External image
- Slingsby T.59D Kestrel

The Slingsby T.59 Kestrel is a British Open class glider which first flew in August 1970. Of fibreglass construction, it features camber-changing flaps, airbrakes, and a retractable main wheel.

Originally a licensed-built version of the Glasflügel 401, the Kestrel was produced in several variants culminating in the T.59H of 22 metres (72.2 ft) wing span. The type was successful when used in gliding competitions and was the first glider to complete a 1,000 km (621 mi) pre-declared task.

== Notable competition use ==
- 1970 World Championships - Fourth place, pilot; George Burton.
- 1972 British National Championships - First place, pilot; John Delafield.
- 1972 World Championships - Eight Kestrels entered, highest competitors placed fourth (Nick Goodhart) and sixth (Burton).
- 1975 British National Championships - First place, pilot; George Lee. Eight of the top ten places were taken by Kestrel pilots.

== World record use ==
The 1,000 km out and return pre-declared task world distance record was broken in September 1972 by New Zealander, Dick Georgeson. Covering a distance of 1,001.94 km (622.58 mi) in lee wave this was the first time that this pre-declared distance task had been completed.

== Variants ==
T.59 Kestrel 17
Initial licensed production version of Glasflügel 401, first flown in 1970, five built.
T.59B
Experimental 19 m (62.3 ft) wing span version, one built.
T.59C Kestrel 19
Prototype with carbon fibre wing spar, first flown in May 1971. One aircraft built.
T.59D/E Kestrel 19
Production Kestrel 19, T.59D was a designation given by the British Gliding Association, T.59E was the designation given to the same type by the Civil Aviation Authority. Over 90 aircraft built.
T.59G Kestrel 22
Wing root extensions fitted to increase span to 22 m (72.2 ft), tailplane area enlarged by 25%. One aircraft modified in Australia.
T.59H Kestrel 22
Re-designed four-piece wing. Two aircraft built.

== Aircraft on display ==
- US Southwest Soaring Museum

== Specifications (T.59D Kestrel 19) ==
Data from Jane's.

General characteristics

- Crew: One
- Length: 21 ft 7.75 in (6.6 m)
- Wingspan: 62 ft 4 in (19.0 m)
- Wing area: 138.5 sq ft (12.87 m^{2})
- Aspect ratio: 28
- Empty weight: 728 lb (330 kg)
- Gross weight: 1,041 lb (472 kg)

Performance

- Maximum speed: 155 mph (250 km/h, 135 kn)
- Maximum glide ratio: 44:1
- Rate of sink: 102 ft/min (0.52 m/s)

== See also ==
Related development

- Glasflügel 401

Aircraft of comparable role, configuration, and era

- Schempp-Hirth Nimbus 2
- SZD-38 Jantar 1

Related lists

- List of gliders
