= Sisu 1A =

American glider

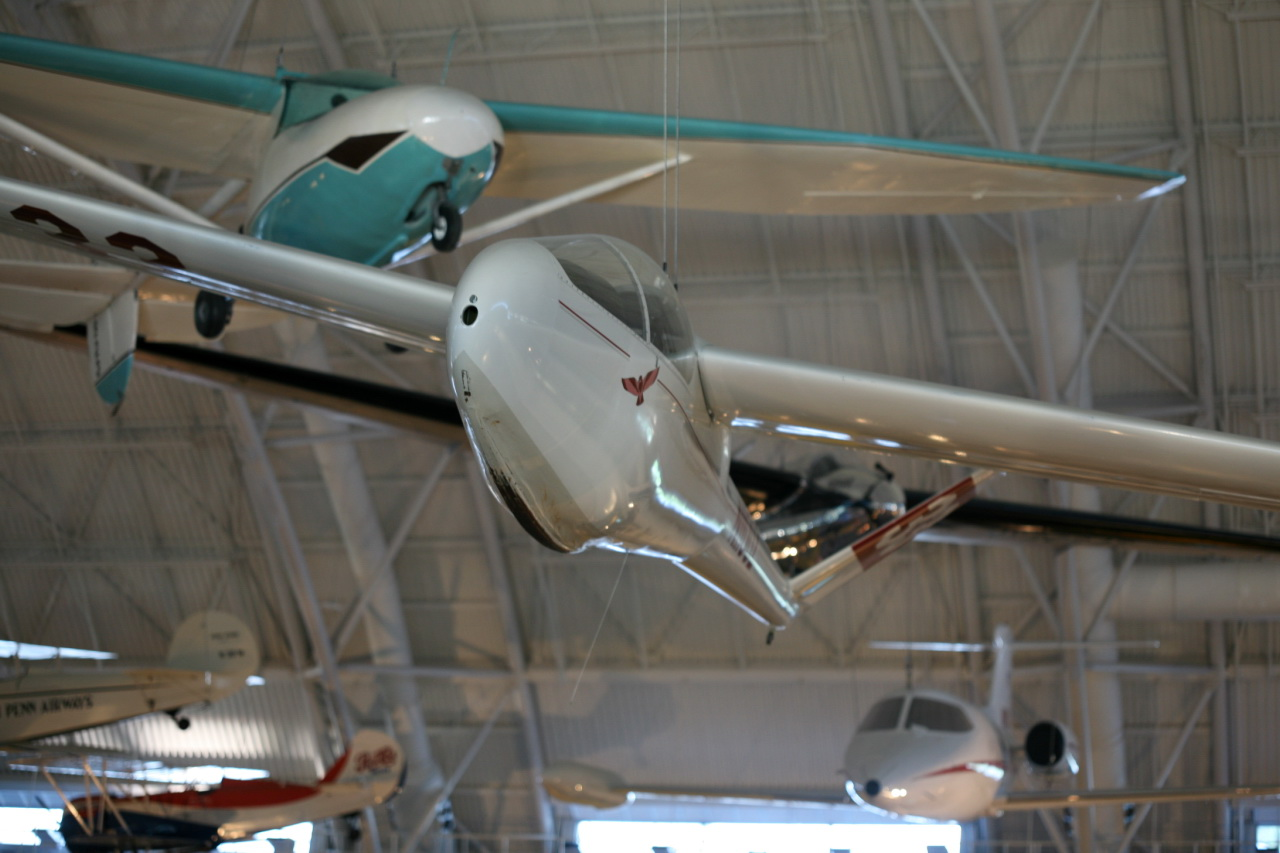
- Sisu 1A on display at the Steven F. Udvar-Hazy Center

General information
- Type: Competition sailplane
- National origin: United States
- Manufacturer: Astro Corporation, Arlington Aircraft Company
- Designer: Leonard Niemi
- Number built: 11

History
- First flight: 20 December 1958

The Sisu 1A is a competition sailplane built in the United States in the late 1950s and early 1960s. Originally designed by Leonard Niemi as a homebuilt sailplane, its first flight in 1958 showed such promise that Niemi decided instead to manufacture it in series production. Niemi formed the Arlington Aircraft Company for this purpose. The Sisu 1A quickly proved itself as the most competitive American sailplane ever developed, winning the 1962, 1965, and 1967 U.S. National Soaring Championships. On July 31, 1964, a Sisu 1a piloted by Alvin H. Parker became the first sailplane ever to fly farther than 1000 km.

Electronic copy of the original invitation (front) to attend the dedication of the Sisu 1A to the Smithsonian in 1968.

Electronic copy of the original invitation (back) to attend the dedication of the Sisu 1A to the Smithsonian in 1968.

== Aircraft on display ==
- The Arlington Sisu 1A that broke the 1000 km distance record was donated to the Smithsonian Institution and resides in the Udvar-Hazy Center (UHC) of the National Air and Space Museum. UHC is located in the Washington, DC suburb of Chantilly, VA near Dulles International Airport.

== Specifications (Sisu 1) ==
Sisu 1A three view drawing

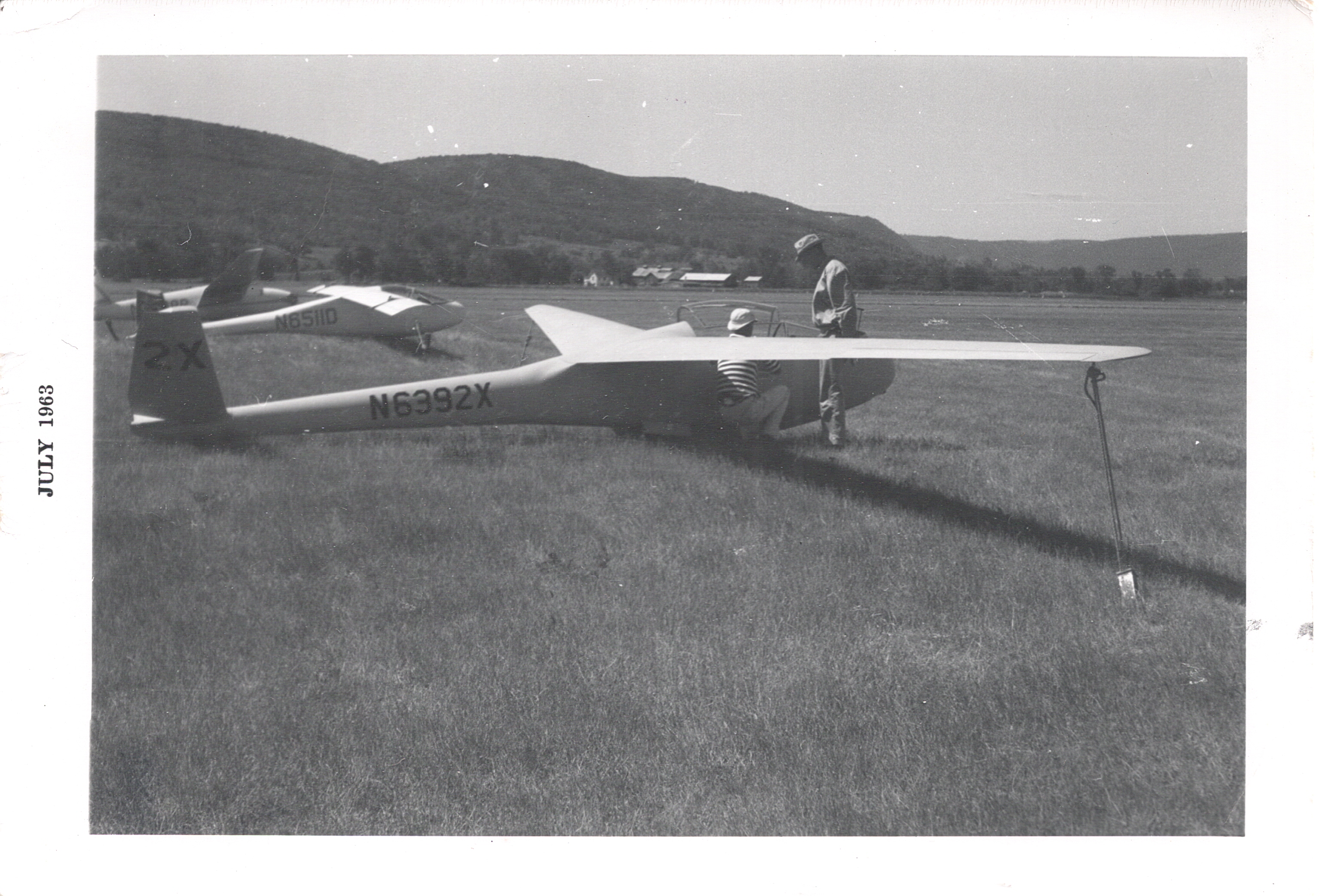
Bill Ivan prepares his Sisu 1A for competition at the 30th National Soaring Championships at Harris Hill, NY in July, 1963.

Data from The World's Sailplanes:Die Segelflugzeuge der Welt:Les Planeurs du Monde Volume II

General characteristics

- Crew: 1
- Length: 20 ft 10 in (6.35 m)
- Wingspan: 50 ft 0 in (15.25 m)
- Height: 3 ft 5 in (1.04 m) at cockpit
- Wing area: 108.5 sq ft (10.08 m^{2})
- Aspect ratio: 23.1
- Airfoil: NACA 65_{3} 418 a=0.5
- Empty weight: 493 lb (223.5 kg)
- Gross weight: 712 lb (323 kg)

Performance

- Stall speed: 41.1 mph (66.2 km/h, 35.7 kn)
- Never exceed speed: 160 mph (260 km/h, 140 kn)
- Rough air speed max: 135.5 mph (218.1 km/h; 117.7 kn)
- Aerotow speed: 118 mph (189.9 km/h; 102.5 kn)
- Winch launch speed: 80 mph (128.7 km/h; 69.5 kn)
- g limits: +6 -4 at 135.5 mph (218.1 km/h; 117.7 kn)
- Maximum glide ratio: 41.4 at 62 mph (99.8 km/h; 53.9 kn)
- Rate of sink: 123.0 ft/min (0.625 m/s) at 55 mph (88.5 km/h; 47.8 kn)
- Wing loading: 6.56 lb/sq ft (32.05 kg/m^{2})
