= Schleicher ASW 12 =

German glider, 1965

ASW 12
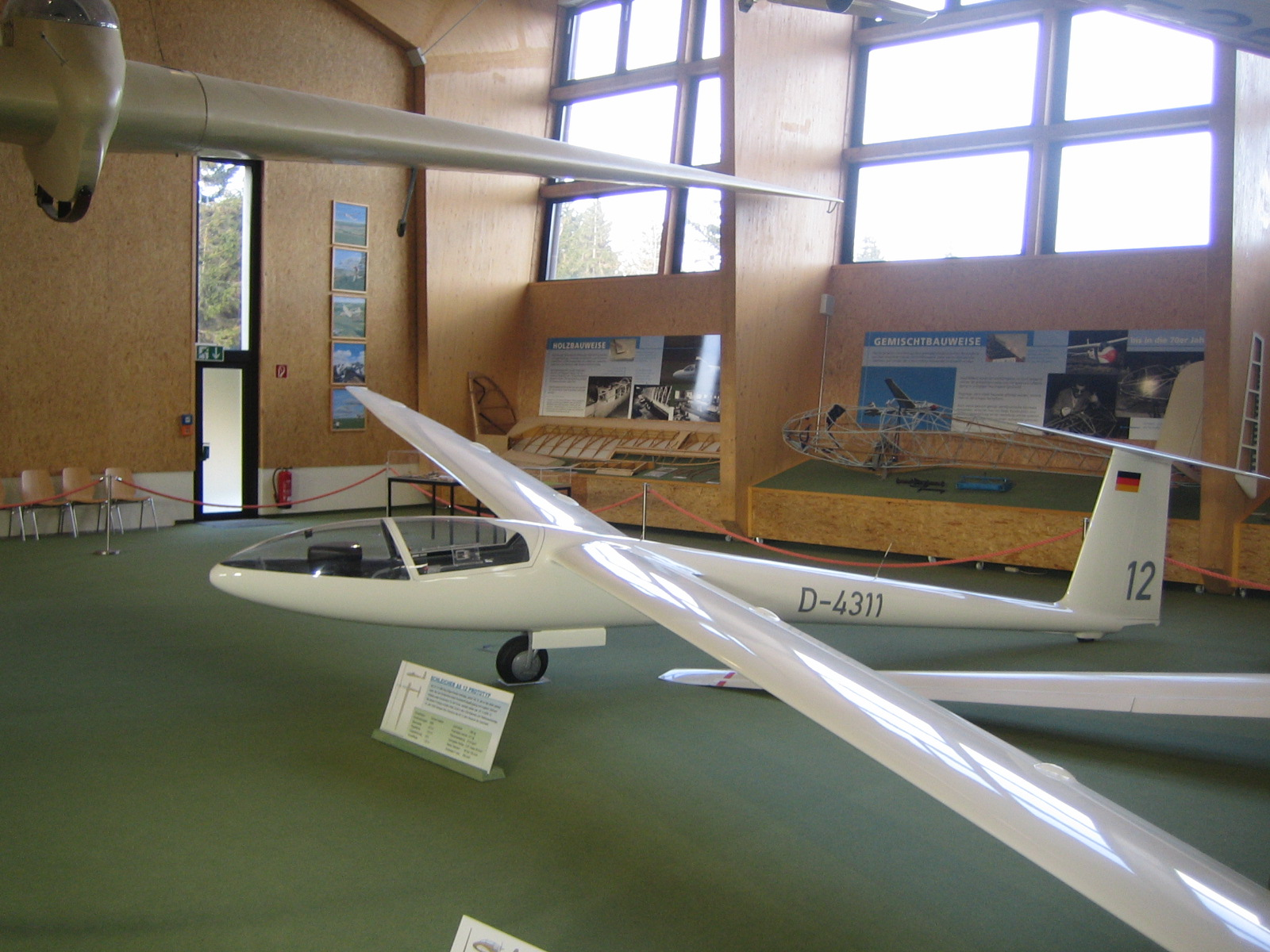

General information
- Type: Open-class sailplane
- National origin: Germany
- Manufacturer: Schleicher
- Designer: Gerhard Waibel
- Number built: 15

History
- First flight: 1965
- Developed from: Akaflieg Darmstadt D-36 Circe

The ASW 12, initially known as the AS 12, is a single-seat Sailplane of glass composite construction. The wing is shoulder mounted and it has a T-tail. It is essentially a developed production version of the Akaflieg Darmstadt D-36.

== History ==
In 1965 Gerhard Waibel left the Technical University of Darmstadt to enter Alexander Schleicher GmbH & Co as a designer. His first project for his new employer was the ASW 12. This sailplane achieved numerous records and victories in national and international competitions. The exploits of Hans-Werner Grosse in an ASW 12 are legendary, e.g. the 1,461 km flight of April 25, 1972 from Lübeck to Biarritz which stood for thirty years as the absolute World Free Distance Record. Previously, on July 26, 1970, Ben Greene and Wally Scott co-set a World Free Distance Record by flying separate ASW-12 sailplanes a distance of 1,153.82 km (716.95 mi) from Odessa, TX to Columbus, NE.

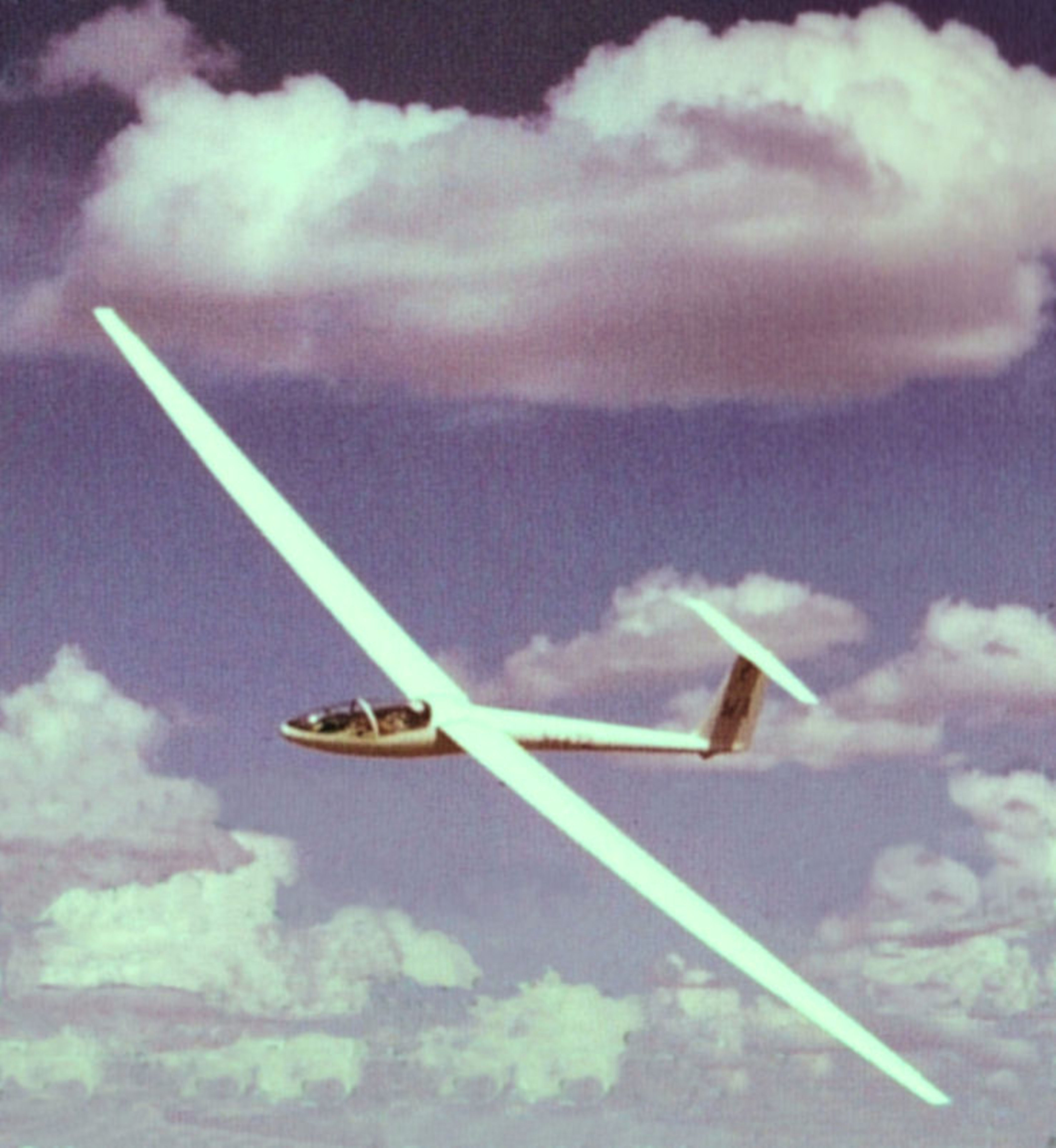
Wally Scott flying his ASW 12 over Odessa, Texas

The ASW12 was succeeded by the ASW17.

== Construction ==
The fuselage of the ASW 12 was extremely slender for its time. It had a retractable landing gear and a two-piece canopy, of greater depth than was the case with the D-36. Each individual fuselage was manufactured - as with the D-36 - in two halves laid-up on positive molds. Construction comprised a double sandwich of glass-fibre reinforced composite over balsa wood.

The wings are double-tapered with a modified Wortmann FX 62-K-131 profile at the root and Wortmann FX 60-126 at the tip. The wings were of fiberglass/balsa wood sandwich construction and were built in the traditional manner using negative molds.

For approach and landing control the ASW 12 possessed a braking parachute rather than traditional spoilers or airbrakes. The system proved unreliable and a number of ASW 12 were retrofitted with a second parachute to reduce the risk of an unsuccessful landing.

== Specifications ==
General characteristics

- Crew: One
- Length: 7.35 m (24 ft 1 in)
- Wingspan: 18.30 m (60 ft 1 in)
- Height: 1.50 m (4 ft 11 in)
- Wing area: 13.0 m^{2} (140 sq ft)
- Aspect ratio: 25.8
- Airfoil: Wortmann FX 62-K-131 modified and FX 60-126
- Empty weight: 324 kg (713 lb)
- Gross weight: 430 kg (946 lb)

Performance

- Maximum speed: 200 km/h (125 mph, 109 kn)
- Maximum glide ratio: ca. 46
- Rate of sink: 0.57 m/s (112 ft/min)

== See also ==
Related lists

- List of gliders
