= AE1 =

AE1 or AE-1 may refer to:

== Military ==
- AE1, Aviation Electrician's Mate First Class, an occupational rating in the US Navy
- Aero Ae 01, a design of Czechoslovak military trainer biplane entering use in 1919
- Aichi AE1A Atsuta, a Japanese aircraft engine of World War II
- HMAS AE1, the first submarine to serve in the Royal Australian Navy
- USS Pyro (AE-1), a ammunition ship of the US Navy

== Other ==
- 2022 AE1, an asteroid discovered in 2022
- AE1, a size designation for Constantinian bronze coins
- AE1, Anion Exchanger 1, a transport protein
- AE1/AE3, an antibody cocktail used in immunohistochemistry
- Air Energy AE-1 Silent, a German self-launching ultralight sailplane
- Canon AE-1, a 35 mm film, single-lens reflex (SLR) camera
