= Alisport Silent 2 Electro =

Italian motor glider

Silent 2 Electro

General information
- Type: Motor glider
- National origin: Italy
- Manufacturer: Alisport

History
- Introduction date: 2011
- Developed from: Alisport Silent 2 Targa

The Alisport Silent 2 Electro is an Italian mid-wing, single-seat motor glider, designed and produced by Alisport of Cremella and provided as a complete ready-to-fly aircraft. The aircraft was introduced at the Aero show held in Friedrichshafen in 2011.

== Design and development ==
The Silent 2 Electro was derived from the Alisport Silent 2 Targa and differs primarily in having the front electric sustainer with its nose-mounted electric motor and propeller and associated batteries and controllers. It was originally called the Silent Targa E.

The aircraft is made from composites and features a T-tail. The wing skins are made from a composite sandwich built over pultruded carbon fibre spars. Its 13.3 m (43.6 ft) span, elliptical planform wing employs a 16% IMD 050 airfoil, has an area of 8.9 m^{2} (96 sq ft) and mounts flaperons. The bubble canopy tips up for access and has a built-in vent. The landing gear consists of a retractable main monowheel gear, a fixed (or optionally steerable) tail wheel and faired polymer wing tip wheels. The 22 kW (30 hp) electric motor is powered by two lithium polymer battery packs mounted near the aircraft's center of gravity, totalling a capacity of 4.3 kWh and weighing 15.5 kg (34.2 lbs). The nose-mounted propeller folds alongside the aircraft's nose when not powered to reduce drag and self-deploys when power is applied. The propeller mounting location eliminates the need for a retractable pylon and allows instant restarts of the engine without preparation, at any time in flight.

The take-off distance on asphalt is 140 m (459 ft) and the engine gives a climb rate of 2.0 m/s (400 ft/min).

== Specifications (Silent 2 Electro) ==
Data from World Directory of Leisure Aviation 2011–12 and Alisport

General characteristics

- Crew: one
- Length: 6.35 m (20 ft 10 in)
- Wingspan: 13.3 m (43 ft 8 in)
- Height: 1.25 m (4 ft 1 in)
- Wing area: 8.9 m^{2} (96 sq ft)
- Aspect ratio: 20:1
- Airfoil: 16% IMD 050
- Empty weight: 205 kg (452 lb)
- Gross weight: 315 kg (694 lb)
- Propellers: 2-bladed composite, 1.0 m (3 ft 3 in) diameter

Performance

- Stall speed: 65 km/h (40 mph, 35 kn)
- Never exceed speed: 220 km/h (140 mph, 120 kn)
- g limits: +5.3 g / -2.65 g at 150 km/h and 315 kg
- Maximum glide ratio: 40:1 at 90 km/h (56 mph)
- Rate of climb: 2.0 m/s (390 ft/min)
- Rate of sink: 0.6 m/s (120 ft/min) at 85 km/h (53 mph)
- Wing loading: 35.4 kg/m^{2} (7.3 lb/sq ft)

== See also ==
- List of gliders
