= Alisport =

Italian light aircraft manufacturer

Coordinates: 45.737793°N 9.3079761°E

Alisport srl
- Company type: Privately held company
- Industry: Aerospace
- Headquarters: Cremella, Italy
- Products: Kit aircraft
- Website: www.alisport.com

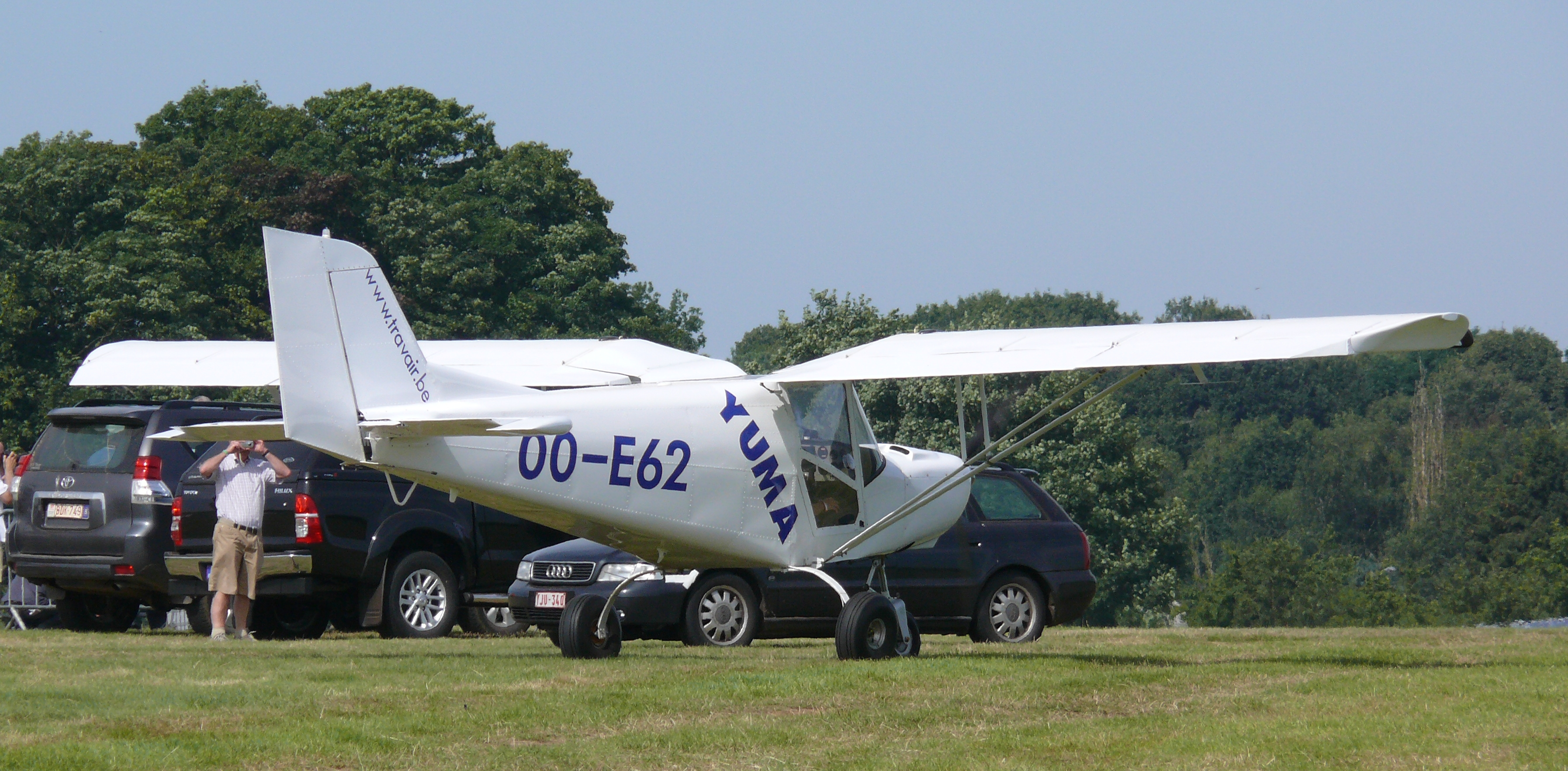
Alisport Yuma

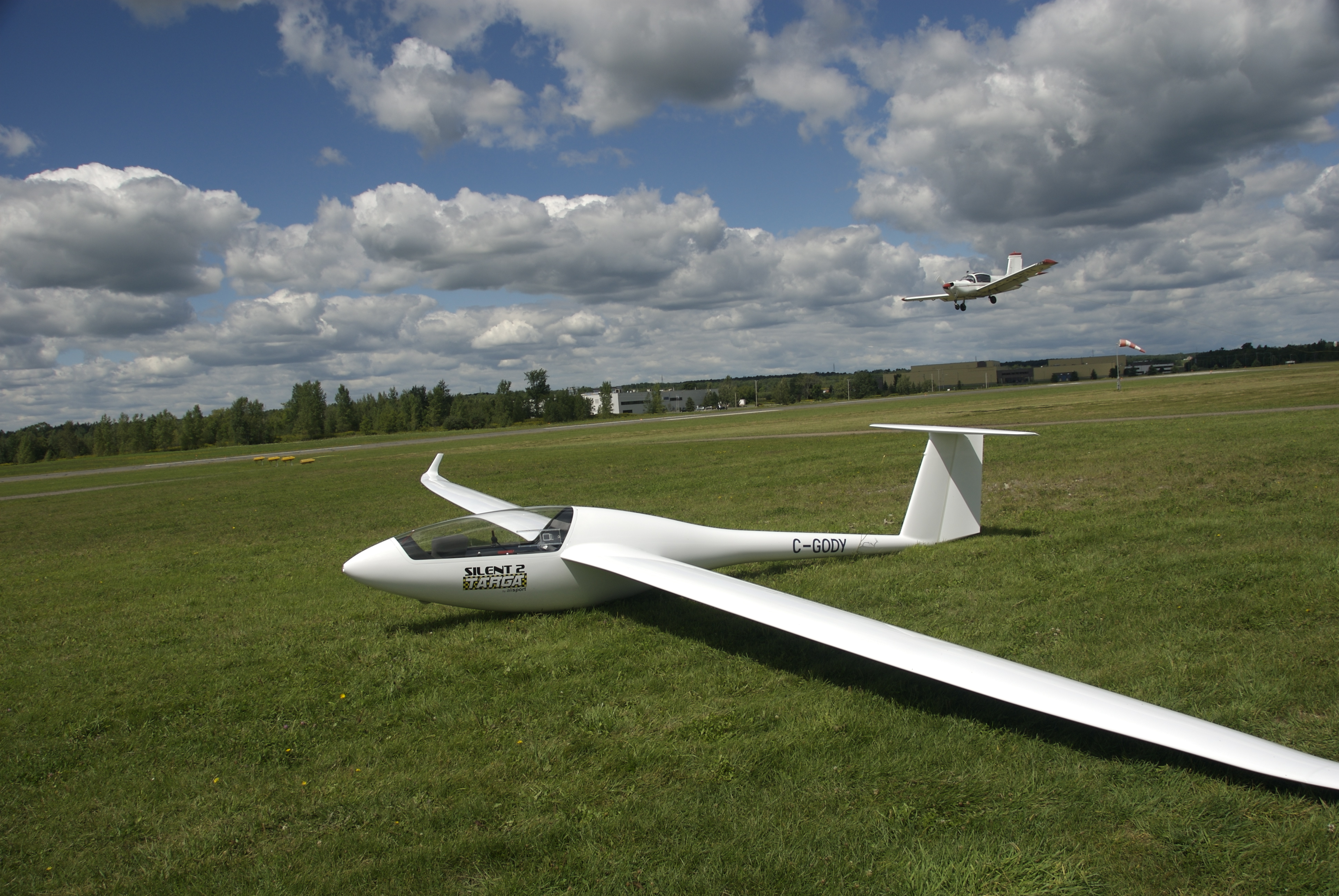
Alisport Silent 2 Targa

Alisport srl is an Italian aircraft manufacturer based in Cremella. The company specializes in the design and manufacture of light aircraft and sailplanes in the form of kits for amateur construction and ready-to-fly aircraft for the European Fédération Aéronautique Internationale microlight category, as well as aircraft propellers.

The company has three aviation divisions in a shared manufacturing facility, which produce the Silent line of sailplanes, microlight STOL aircraft and the Idrovario line of propellers. Alisport has multi-axis computer numerical control milling machines, composite curing ovens and environmentally-friendly paint booths.

The company produces the Alisport Yuma kit-built two seat STOL microlight aircraft and the line of Silent gliders and motorgliders. The Silent series are each available as unpowered sailplanes, fuel-injected piston-engine powered self-launching motorgliders or Lithium-ion battery electric-powered self-launching motorgliders.

Zenith Aircraft considers the Yuma an unauthorized copy of the Zenith STOL CH 701.

== Aircraft ==
Summary of aircraft built by Alisport
Model name	First flight	Number built	Type
Alisport Yuma			Two seat STOL microlight aircraft
Alisport Silent 2		28 (2011)	single seat sailplane
Alisport Silent 2 Electro			single seat sailplane
Alisport Silent 2 Targa		~80	single seat sailplane
Alisport Silent Club			single seat sailplane

== See also ==
- List of aircraft propeller manufacturers
