= SFAN 4 =

1930s French aircraft

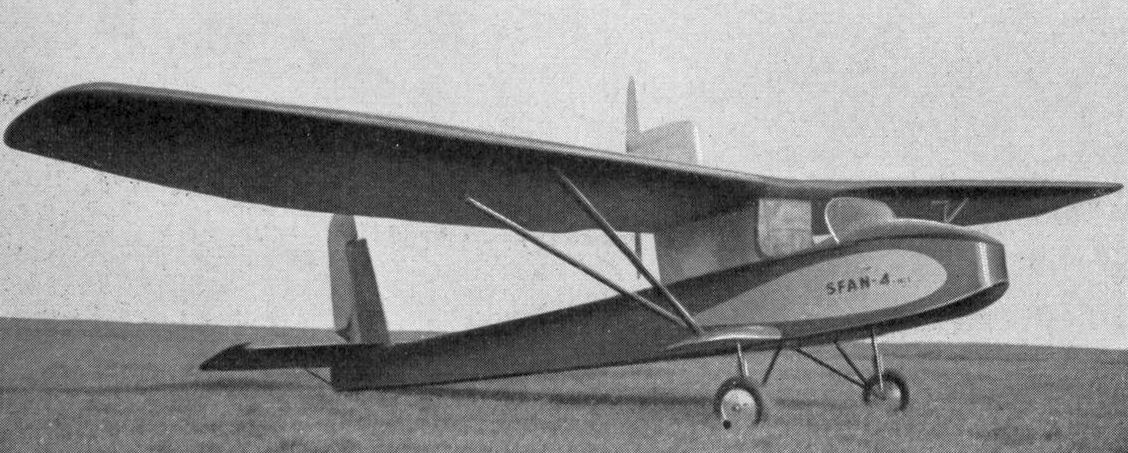

General information
- Type: Training ultralight aircraft
- National origin: France
- Manufacturer: SFAN

History
- First flight: 1936

The SFAN 4 was a French motor-glider built in the late 1930s.

== Specifications ==
Data from

General characteristics

- Crew: 2
- Length: 6.72 m (22 ft 1 in)
- Wingspan: 12.5 m (41 ft 0 in)
- Height: 1.27 m (4 ft 2 in)
- Wing area: 18.5 m^{2} (199 sq ft)
- Aspect ratio: 12
- Empty weight: 235 kg (518 lb)
- Max takeoff weight: 435 kg (959 lb)
- Powerplant: 1 × Mengin C 2-cylinder air-cooled horizontally-opposed piston engine, 26 kW (35 hp)
- Propellers: 2-bladed fixed-pitch pusher propeller

Performance

- Maximum speed: 140 km/h (87 mph, 76 kn)
- Rate of sink: 2 m/s (390 ft/min) power off
- Lift-to-drag: 11:1
- Wing loading: 24.1 kg/m^{2} (4.9 lb/sq ft)
