= Albastar A1 =

A1

General information
- Type: Motor glider
- National origin: Slovenia
- Manufacturer: Albastar Ltd
- Designer: Pavel Potočnik
- Status: Production completed

The Albastar A1 is a Slovenian mid-wing, T-tailed, single-seat motor glider that was designed by Pavel Potočnik and produced by Albastar Ltd.

== Design and development ==
The A1 is a self-launching glider, with the standard 30 kW (40 hp) Rotax 447 mounted in tractor configuration on a retractable pylon behind the cockpit. When retracted the engine is hidden behind two doors. The German importer of the glider equipped his aircraft with a Hirth engine instead of the Rotax powerplant.

The A1 is of mixed composite construction and is built from a combination of carbon-fiber-reinforced polymer, kevlar and PVC foam. The 15 m (49.2 ft) span wing features winglets and produces a 40:1 glide ratio. The landing gear is a retractable monowheel gear. The price of the A1 in 2003 was €39,900.

== Specifications (2003 model A1) ==
Data from World Directory of Leisure Aviation 2003-04

General characteristics

- Crew: one
- Wingspan: 15 m (49 ft 3 in)
- Wing area: 12.26 m^{2} (132.0 sq ft)
- Empty weight: 300 kg (661 lb)
- Propellers: two-bladed wooden

Performance

- Stall speed: 63 km/h (39 mph, 34 kn)
- Never exceed speed: 362 km/h (225 mph, 196 kn)
- Maximum glide ratio: 40:1
- Rate of sink: 0.58 m/s (114 ft/min)

== See also ==
- List of gliders
