= Alisport Yuma =

Yuma
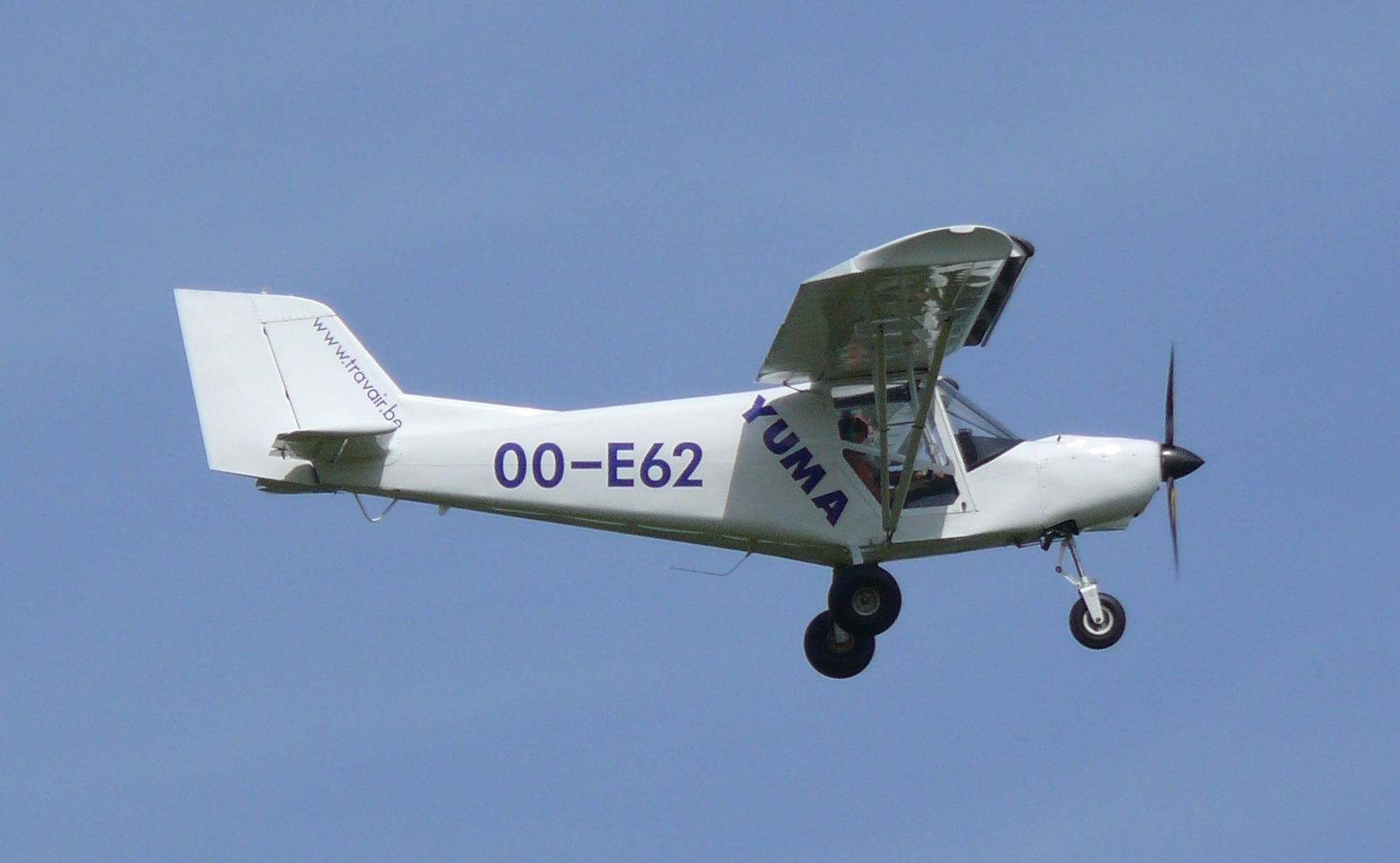

General information
- Type: Ultralight aircraft
- National origin: Italy
- Manufacturer: Alisport
- Status: In production

History
- Developed from: Zenith STOL CH 701
- Variant: G1 Aviation G1

The Alisport Yuma is an Italian ultralight aircraft, produced by Alisport of Cremella. The aircraft is supplied as a kit for amateur construction or as a complete ready-to-fly-aircraft.

Zenith Aircraft considers that the Yuma uses the wing of the Zenith STOL CH 701. The World Directory of Light Aviation describes it as being inspired by the CH 701.

== Design and development ==
The aircraft was designed to comply with the Fédération Aéronautique Internationale microlight rules. It features STOL performance, a strut-braced high-wing, a two-seats-in-side-by-side configuration enclosed cockpit, fixed tricycle landing gear and a single engine in tractor configuration.

The Yuma's fuselage is made from welded steel tubing, covered in aluminium sheet and the tail surfaces covered in doped aircraft fabric. The wing is all-aluminium, with its leading edge slats made from carbon fibre. Its 9.75 m (32.0 ft) span wing employs V-struts, jury struts and flaps. Standard engines available are the 80 hp (60 kW) Rotax 912UL, the 100 hp (75 kW) Rotax 912ULS and the 115 hp (86 kW) Rotax 914 turbo-charged four-stroke powerplant.

== Specifications (Yuma) ==
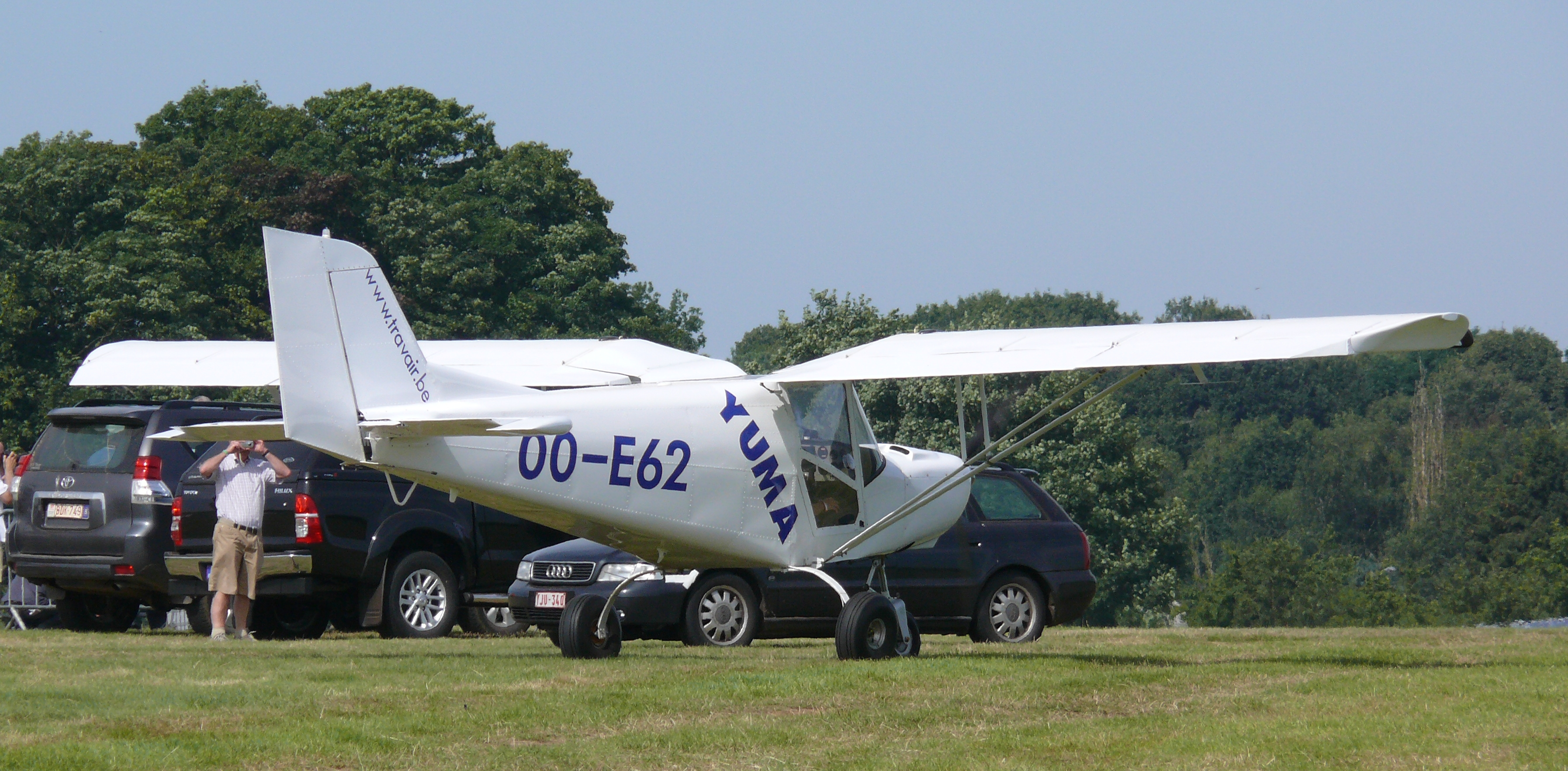
Alisport Yuma

Data from Bayerl

General characteristics

- Crew: one
- Capacity: one passenger
- Length: 6.45 m (21 ft 2 in)
- Wingspan: 9.75 m (32 ft 0 in)
- Height: 2.45 m (8 ft 0 in)
- Wing area: 13.44 m^{2} (144.7 sq ft)
- Aspect ratio: 6.6:1
- Empty weight: 282 kg (622 lb)
- Gross weight: 450 kg (992 lb)
- Fuel capacity: 85 litres (19 imp gal; 22 US gal)
- Powerplant: 1 × Rotax 912ULS four cylinder, liquid and air-cooled, four stroke, 75 kW (101 hp)

Performance

- Maximum speed: 185 km/h (115 mph, 100 kn)
- Cruise speed: 160 km/h (99 mph, 86 kn)
- Stall speed: 50 km/h (31 mph, 27 kn) flaps down
- Endurance: 4.5 hours at 75% power
- Service ceiling: 5,000 m (16,000 ft)
- Rate of climb: 8 m/s (1,600 ft/min)
- Wing loading: 33.5 kg/m^{2} (6.9 lb/sq ft)
