= Pipistrel Apis-Bee =

Slovenian motorglider

Apis-Bee

General information
- Type: Motor glider
- National origin: Slovenia
- Manufacturer: Pipistrel
- Status: Production completed (2018)

History
- Developed from: Pipistrel Apis

The Pipistrel Apis-Bee, also called the Apis/Bee, (Apis means bee in Latin) is a Slovenian mid-wing, single-seat glider and motor glider that was designed and produced by Pipistrel.

By October 2018, it was listed as a "legacy" product and production had ended.

== Design and development ==
The Apis-Bee is a second generation derivation of the original Pipistrel Apis design. The company explains the name of this version, "In some countries, the name 'Apis' is trademarked, so we are unable to use it. These countries are, as far as we know, the following: Germany, Austria, Switzerland and some Scandinavian countries. There, the aircraft is marketed as 'Bee'. We chose this because 'Apis' in Latin means a bee."

The aircraft is made from composites, predominately carbon fibre and fibreglass with some portions in sandwich configuration and some as shells. The tailplane is a T-tail configuration. The wing is the same as the wing used on the Pipistrel Sinus and Taurus. Its 14.97 m (49.1 ft) span wing employs a 17.01% IMD 029 airfoil, has an area of 12.24 m^{2} (131.8 sq ft), an aspect ratio of 18.33 and mounts flaperons as well as Schempp-Hirth style airbrakes. The powered version has a pylon-mounted, retractable Hirth F33 BS two-stroke single cylinder engine.

The Apis-Bee differs from the early Apis by the incorporation of 133 improvements, including: retractable landing gear, steerable tailwheel, ballistic parachute, enlarged cockpit, new lighter Hirth F33BS engine that can be removed quickly and has faster engine extension and retraction, a redesigned propeller, lower vibration levels and better cooling, standard wing-mounted 20 litres (4.4 imp gal; 5.3 US gal) fuel tank replacing the former 8 litres (1.8 imp gal; 2.1 US gal) tank, new instrument panel, cockpit control ergonomics, the engine management system from the Taurus, re-balanced and lighter flight control feel, optional 5.00 × 5 main wheel, leather interior, solar panels to run the on-board electrical system, improved cockpit ventilation and canopy defog and a new firewall between the cockpit and the engine compartment.

== Operational history ==
The Apis-Bee holds many Fédération Aéronautique Internationale world records in the under 300 kg (661 lb) class:

- Free out and return distance: 310 km (192.6 mi), Tanja Pristavec, DU feminine
- Free distance using up to 3 turn points: 347.6 km (216.0 mi), Tanja Pristavec, DU feminine
- Free distance: 154 km (95.7 mi), (Tanja Pristavec, DU feminine)
- Free distance using up to 3 turn points: 808.9 km (502.6 mi), Boštjan Pristavec
- Speed over a triangular course of 100 km (62.1 mi): 76.9 km/h (47.8 mph), Tanja Pristavec, DU feminine
- Out-and-return distance: 501 km (311.3 mi), Andrej Kolar, DU general
- Speed over an out-and-return course of 500 km (310.7 mi): 82.1 km/h (51.0 mph), Andrej Kolar, DU general
- Free Three Turn Points Distance: 619.7 km (385.1 mi), Andrej Kolar, DU general
- Free out-and-return distance: 511.6 km (317.9 mi), Andrej Kolar, DU general
- Speed record over a triangular course: 118.2 km/h (73.4 mph), Boštjan Pristavec

== Specifications (Apis-Bee motorglider) ==
Data from World Directory of Leisure Aviation 2011-12 and manufacturer

General characteristics

- Crew: one
- Length: 6.26 m (20 ft 6 in)
- Wingspan: 14.97 m (49 ft 1 in)
- Height: 1.3 m (4 ft 3 in)
- Wing area: 12.24 m^{2} (131.8 sq ft)
- Aspect ratio: 18.33:1
- Airfoil: 17.01% IMD 029
- Empty weight: 222 kg (489 lb)
- Gross weight: 322.5 kg (711 lb)
- Fuel capacity: 20 litres (4.4 imp gal; 5.3 US gal)
- Powerplant: 1 × Hirth F33 BS single cylinder, two-stroke aircraft engine, 21 kW (28 hp)
- Propellers: 2-bladed wood with fibreglass reinforcement

Performance

- Stall speed: 58 km/h (36 mph, 31 kn)
- Never exceed speed: 220 km/h (140 mph, 120 kn)
- g limits: +5.3/-2.65
- Maximum glide ratio: 40:1 at 94 km/h (58 mph)
- Rate of climb: 3.3 m/s (650 ft/min)
- Rate of sink: 0.59 m/s (116 ft/min)
- Wing loading: 26.3 kg/m^{2} (5.4 lb/sq ft)

== See also ==
- List of gliders
