= Albastar AS =

Albastar AS are gliders produced by the Slovenian company Albastar Ltd. They are currently in the development stage.

== Albastar AS-13,5m FES ==
Albastar 13,5m FES is a single-seat motor glider with 13.5 m wingspan designed for FAI 13.5 m class which took its maiden flight in April 2013. To achieve better performance, the new airfoil with flaps was designed. It has provision for Ballistic Recovery System (BRS). The cockpit was designed roomy enough to be used by taller pilots.

The glider has 23 kW front electric sustainer (FES) positioned in the nose which in combination with low takeoff weight is powerful enough to be used for self-launch. This system uses folding propeller which greatly reduces aerodynamic drag when not in use. The take-off roll is 170 m with enough battery capacity to reach 1800 m AGL. However, the glider also incorporates a tow hook mounted in the center of gravity for the classic aerotow.

Two AS-13,5 gliders took part on the 2nd FAI 13.5 m World championship in Szatymaz in 2017.

AS13,5m
Wingspan	13.5 m (44 ft)
Profile	IMD 14%
Length	6.5 m (21 ft)
Empty weight	200 kg (440 lb)
MTOW	300 kg (660 lb)
MTOW with BRS	312.5 kg (689 lb)
Maximum speed (V_{NE})	225 km/h (121 kn)
Minimum speed at 300 kg MTOW	64 km/h (35 kn)
Minimum sink	0.62 m/s at 80 km/h (2,03 ft/s at 43.2 kn)
Max L/D	42 at 105 km/h (57 kn)
Take-off distance	170 m (560 ft)
Max. climb rate with engine	2.6 m/s (8.5 ft/s)
Max range with engine	120 km (64.8 NM)

== Albastar AS-18 ==
Albastar AS-18 is a two-seat motor glider with 18 m wingspan. First prototype AS-18M is powered by two-stroke internal combustion engine with the propeller mast mounted behind the cockpit. It has a self-launching capability and unlike other similar gliders, it has the unique feature of starting the engine before the propeller mast is extended, therefore practically eliminating the period of increased drag before the engine is started.

The second prototype, AS-18 GEN is powered by the more powerful version of the FES system. It uses the 42 kW electric motor which is powered by the electric generator driven by the gasoline engine mounted in the fuselage behind the cockpit.
