= Alisport Silent 2 =

Silent 2
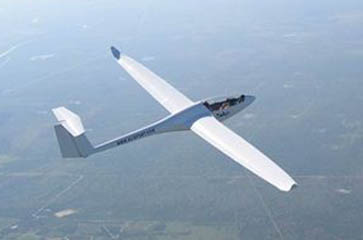
- A Silent 2 with elliptical winglets

General information
- Type: DU class sailplane
- National origin: Italy
- Manufacturer: Alisport
- Number built: 28 (2011)

The Alisport Silent 2 is a single seater sailplane of Italian manufacture. It is of the FAI type DU Class glider. It is sold by Alisport ready-to-fly or kit-built as pure glider or self-launching glider.

The self-launching version is fitted with a single-blade propeller belt-driven by a two-stroke engine.

One Silent 2, two Silent 2 electrics and 25 Silent 2 Self-Launch models had been completed and flown by the end of 2011.

A version with the front electric sustainer is available

== Design and construction ==
The fuselage is carbon and glass fiber composite with epoxy resin. The wings have an elliptical planform, vertical or elliptical design winglets. The wing structure includes extensive use of carbon fiber, both in the sandwich skins and in the tapered I-beam wing spar which uses pultruded carbon rods for the spar caps. The wing geometry is notable in that it varies non-linearly from the root to the tip, both in overall planform shape and in wing section profile.

The flaperons stretch for 11.0 meters of the full wingspan and their range of motion varies from positive landing L +8°, to +4° for thermalling, to 0°, -4°, and S -8° reflex positions for cruising. Schempp-Hirth-type spoilers extend on the upper wing surface only. There is a fixed main wheel behind the pilot, with shock absorber and drum brake activated via spoiler control lever aft travel.

== Safety and operational qualities ==
The Silent 2 has light ailerons, light elevator, generous rudder. The roll rate is quick because of the lively feel of the ailerons. Stall is predictable and recovery simple. In level flight as airspeed is reduced when approaching the stall speed the sailplane vibrate a little, at this point decreasing the angle of attack results in airspeed increase and normal flight resume, from a climbing attitude the sailplane stall decisively, the nose pitch down gently and recovery is easy with stick forward. Spin entry is obvious and recovered with rudder and stick.

== Specifications ==
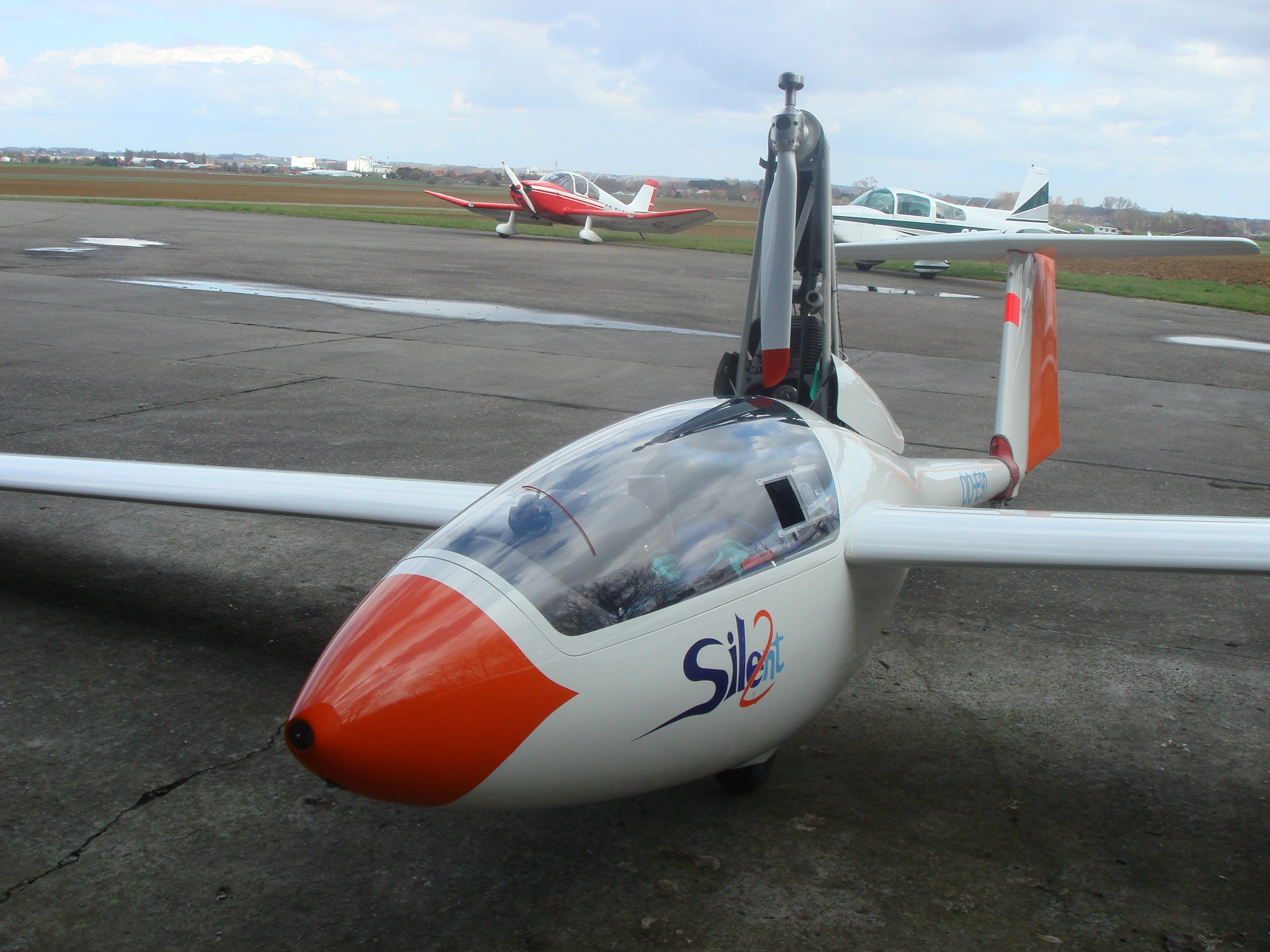
Alisport Silent 2

General characteristics

- Crew: One pilot
- Length: 6.35 m (20 ft 10 in)
- Wingspan: 13.00 m (42 ft 8 in)
- Height: 1.25 m (4 ft 1 in)
- Wing area: 8.9 m^{2} (96 sq ft)
- Aspect ratio: 20.0
- Empty weight: 130 kg (286 lb)
- Gross weight: 300 kg (661 lb)

Performance

- Maximum speed: 220 km/h (138 mph, 120 kn)
- Maximum glide ratio: 40 at 90 km/h (56 mph)
- Rate of sink: 0.60 m/s (118 ft/min)

== See also ==
Related development

- Alisport Silent Club
- Alisport Silent 2 Targa
