= Albastar Ltd =

Slovenian aircraft manufacturer

- Company type: Privately held company
- Industry: Aerospace
- Founded: 1993
- Founder: Pavel Potočnik
- Headquarters: Begunje na Gorenjskem, Slovenia
- Products: Gliders
- Website: www.gliders-albastar.com

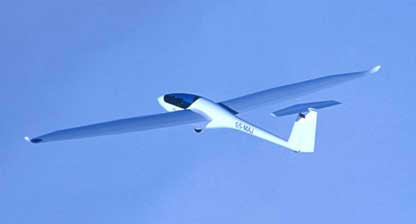
Albastar Apis

Albastar Ltd (also called Albastar d.o.o.) is a Slovenian aircraft manufacturer, founded by former Elan employee Pavel Potočnik in 1993. It was originally based in Zgornje Gorje and now in Begunje na Gorenjskem. The company specializes in the design and manufacture of gliders and light aircraft in the form of ready-to-fly aircraft, plus the production of subcontract aircraft parts for other manufacturers.

The company has produced several designs of its own, including the now out-of-production Albastar A1 motorglider and the Albastar Apis sailplane. The current production aircraft is the Albastar AS self-launching sailplane, available as a 13.5 m (44.3 ft) span FAI 13.5 m Class or 18 m (59.1 ft) span FAI Open Class sailplane.

Albastar also has collaborated with other companies, notably Pipistrel on the development of the Pipistrel Sinus motor glider for which it completed the majority of the aerodynamic work. Albastar continues to produce the Sinus wings as well as the wings for the Pipistrel Virus and Pipistrel Taurus.

The company also produced propellers for ultralight trikes and wind turbine blades for electrical power generation.

== Aircraft ==
Summary of aircraft built by Albastar Ltd
| Model name | First flight | Number built | Type |
|---|---|---|---|
| Albastar A1 | | | Mid-wing, T-tailed, single-seat motor glider |
| Albastar Apis | 2000 | | single seat sailplane |
| Albastar AS | | | single seat self-launching sailplane |
