= G1 Aviation G1 =

French homebuilt aircraft

G1
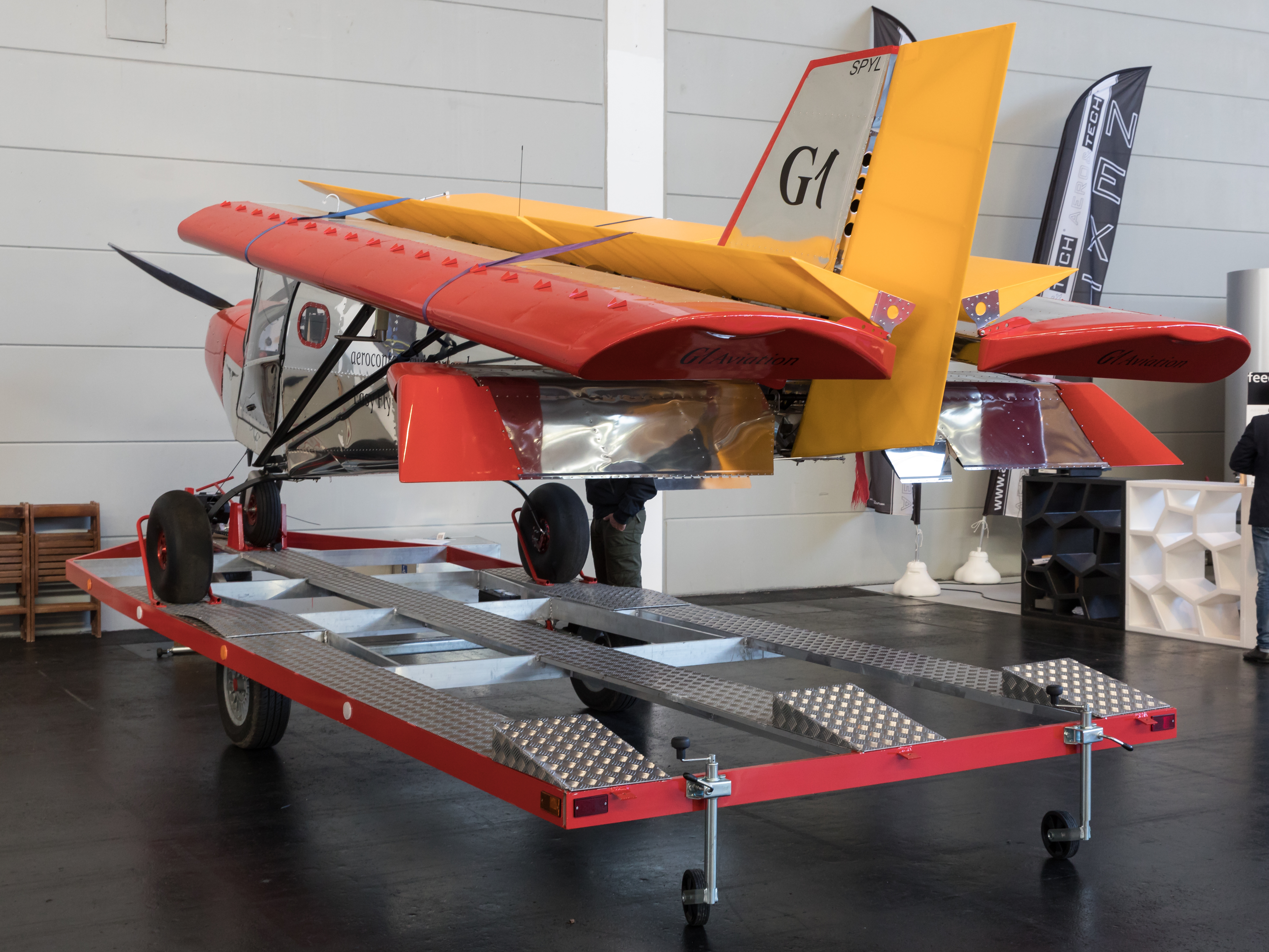

General information
- Type: Ultralight aircraft
- National origin: France
- Manufacturer: G1 Aviation
- Status: In production

History
- Developed from: Alisport Yuma

The G1 Aviation G1 is a French STOL ultralight aircraft, designed and produced by G1 Aviation of Tallard. The aircraft is supplied as a kit for amateur construction or as a complete ready-to-fly-aircraft.

== Design and development ==
The aircraft is derived from the Alisport Yuma and was designed to comply with the Fédération Aéronautique Internationale microlight rules. It features a strut-braced high wing, a two-seats-in-side-by-side configuration enclosed cockpit, fixed tricycle landing gear and a single engine in tractor configuration.

All G1 models have a fuselage made from welded steel tubing, with the wing made from aluminum, all covered in doped aircraft fabric. The Gelinotte variant has a 9.9 m (32.5 ft) span wing with an area of 14.80 m^{2} (159.3 sq ft) and features leading edge slots. The SPYL model uses vortex generators in place of the slots, has the same wing span, but a slightly smaller wing area of 14.27 m^{2} (153.6 sq ft). All models are equipped with flaps and have optional folding wings for ground transport and storage. Standard engines available are the 60 kW (80 hp) Rotax 912UL and the 75 kW (101 hp) Rotax 912ULS four-stroke powerplants. The company also offers a new exhaust system for the Rotax 912 that is quieter than the stock Rotax-supplied system.

The aircraft has also been equipped with the JLT Motors Ecoyota engine.

== Variants ==
G1 Amphibie (English - Amphibian)
Amphibious version on aluminium floats.
G1 Gelinotte (English - Hazel Grouse)
Wheel-equipped version. The wing is equipped with leading edge slots.
G1 la Grive (English - Thrush)
Agricultural aircraft version.
G1 SPYL
Wheel-equipped version introduced at the Aero show held in Friedrichshafen in 2010 and named for the two designers of the aircraft model, Serge Present and Yvan Lhermitte. The SPYL replaces the Gelinotte's wing, which is equipped with leading edge slots, with a new wing equipped with vortex generators instead. The new wing makes this model 20 kg (44 lb) lighter and 15%-20% faster than the Gelinotte. SPYL wings can be retrofitted to the Gelinotte.
G1 Agricole
Agricultural aircraft version with the same wing as the SPYL, employing vortex generators in place of leading edge slots. It can be equipped with an external chemical tank of up to 150 L (40 US gal) and spraying equipment. It is only sold ready-to-fly with the 100 hp (75 kW) Rotax 912ULS engine.

== Specifications (G1 SPYL) ==
Data from Bayerl

General characteristics

- Crew: one
- Capacity: one passenger
- Wingspan: 9.9 m (32 ft 6 in)
- Wing area: 14.27 m^{2} (153.6 sq ft)
- Empty weight: 274 kg (604 lb)
- Gross weight: 472.5 kg (1,042 lb)
- Fuel capacity: 76 litres (17 imp gal; 20 US gal)
- Powerplant: 1 × Rotax 912ULS four cylinder, liquid and air-cooled, four stroke aircraft engine, 75 kW (101 hp)

Performance

- Maximum speed: 200 km/h (120 mph, 110 kn)
- Cruise speed: 182 km/h (113 mph, 98 kn)
- Stall speed: 50 km/h (31 mph, 27 kn)
- Rate of climb: 5 m/s (980 ft/min)
- Wing loading: 33.11 kg/m^{2} (6.78 lb/sq ft)
