= Air Energy AE-1 Silent =

AE-1 Silent
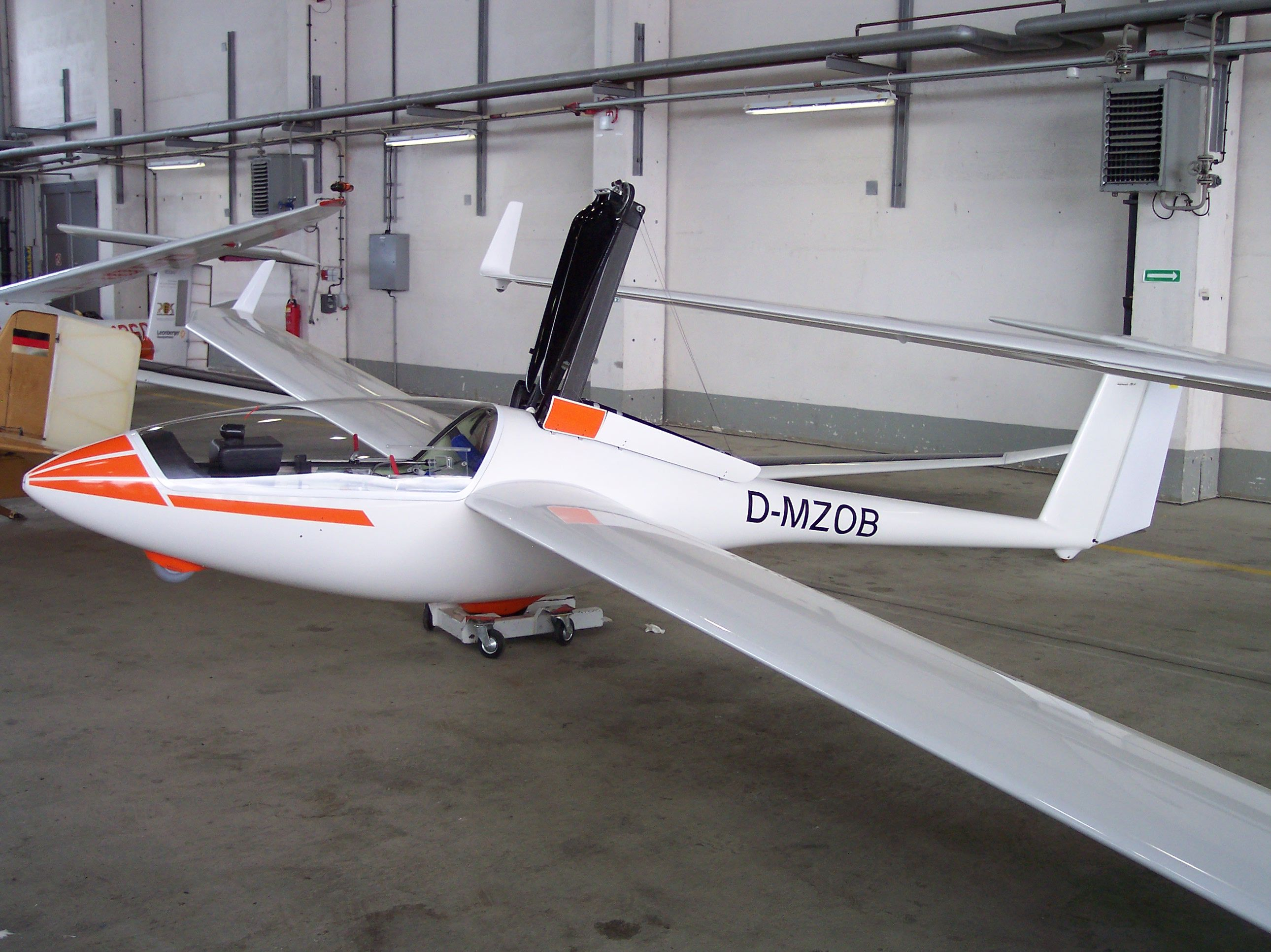

General information
- Type: Ultralight sailplane
- National origin: Germany
- Manufacturer: Air Energy

History
- First flight: August 1997

The Air Energy AE-1 Silent is a German self-launching ultralight sailplane powered by an electric motor. Designed and built by Air Energy, the AE-1 Silent is also marketed by Alisport of Italy, see Alisport Silent 2 Targa. It first flew in August 1997.

== Design and development ==
The Silent is a conventional composite monoplane glider with a retractable 13 kW (17 hp) electric motor driving a 1.92m propeller.

The aircraft was originally marketed with a nickel–cadmium battery pack, but in 2005 this was replaced with a lithium polymer battery system that gives three times the range of the early installation.

== Specifications ==
Data from manufacturer

General characteristics

- Crew: 1
- Wingspan: 12 m (39 ft 4 in)
- Wing area: 10.3 m^{2} (111 sq ft)
- Aspect ratio: 14
- Empty weight: 195 kg (430 lb)
- Gross weight: 300 kg (661 lb)
- Powerplant: 1 × Battery-powered electric motor , 13 kW (17 hp)

Performance

- Maximum speed: 180 km/h (112 mph, 97 kn)
- Service ceiling: 2,000 m (6,560 ft)
- Rate of climb: 2.2 m/s (433 ft/min)
- Rate of sink: 0.78 m/s (154 ft/min)
