= Alisport Silent 2 Targa =

Silent 2 Targa
- A Silent 2 Targa fuselage with a pilot trying out the cockpit

General information
- Type: DU Class glider
- Manufacturer: Alisport
- Number built: approx. 80

History
- First flight: 8 December 1994
- Variants: Alisport Silent 2 Electro

The Silent 2 Targa is a single seater sailplane of Italian manufacture. It is of the FAI DU Class glider. It is sold by Alisport ready-to-fly or kit-built as pure glider or self-launching glider. The self-launching version can be fitted with a single-blade propeller belt-driven by a two-stroke engine or with a double-blade folding propeller directly driven by an electric motor.

== Development ==
The development of the Silent goes back to the early 1990s and its roots can be found in Walter Mauri's light sailplane called the "Dream".

On 8 December 1994 the definitive prototype of Silent light sailplane made its maiden flight from the small grass strip of Gagliano in the northeastern Italian province of Friuli. The glider, flown by test pilot Walter Mauri and towed by a 50 hp trike, was airborne in 200m and, after climbing to 600m, successfully flew for 16 minutes. Series production of the "Silent 2" with the 13m wings will begin in the second half of 2003. On 1 September 2003, USAF Captain Brock Vaughn flew his kit-built self-launch Silent Club sailplane for the first time. On 22 November 2003 the first test flights of a jet-powered Silent Club sailplane were conducted. Powered by twin AMT USA engines, the 12m Silent easily self-launched with acceptable take-off distance and good climb rate. Several successful flights were conducted to analyze performance, handling, temperature issues, and engine systems.

== Design ==
The fuselage is carbon and glass fiber composite with epoxy resin. The wings have an elliptical planform, vertical or elliptical design winglets. The wing structure includes extensive use of carbon fiber, both in the sandwich skins and in the tapered I-beam wing spar which uses pultruded carbon rods for the spar caps. The wing geometry is notable in that it varies non-linearly from the root to the tip, both in overall planform shape and in wing section profile. The flaperons stretch for 11.0 meters of the full wingspan and their range of motion varies from positive landing L +8°, to +4° for thermalling, to 0°, -4°, and S -8° reflex positions for cruising. Schempp-Hirth-type spoilers extend on the upper wing surface only. Opening the single-element spoilers with stick held results in a noticeable nose-down pitch movement. This, however, can easily be avoided by maintaining the nose attitude relative to the horizon; doing this will cause little airspeed change. Closing the spoilers has a similar pitch-up effect, again easily controlled with stick movement. On approach, the spoilers are moderately effective. Descent rate can be quickly increased by slipping. At approach speed with spoilers out, there is a clear view ahead over the nose.

The sailplane is trimmed in pitch via an innovative variable-position horizontal stabilizer. The stabilizer position is governed by the flaperon setting. The five settings of the flaperons control produce corresponding changes to the stabilizer incidence, thus defining the trim airspeed in relation to the flaperons requirements. The conventional elevator remains in trail, minimizing trim drag. There is a fixed or retractable main wheel behind the pilot, with shock absorber and drum brake activated via spoiler control lever aft travel.

The Silent airframe has undergone thorough analysis (Politecnico di Milano) and testing (both by the factory and independent parties). The factory performed complete in-house destructive tests of the wings to confirm that the structure met design loads (the ratings are +5.3/-3.0, +4.6/-2.6, +4.3/-2.3 respectively for the aircraft at gross weight). Note that the Italian RAI (equivalent of the FAA) requires independent testing of the aircraft since the Silent falls within the Italian equivalent of proposed Sport Category. However, for Germany, independent structural tests to failure under supervision of the LBA (German equivalent of the FAA) were required. They are noteworthy in that they are performed at a temperature of 54 °C (129 °F)! All tests exceeded the 1.5 safety factor requirement. The structural test program also included fuselage drop testing, stabilizer load testing, and control system load testing. A certificate was issued by the LBA showing conformance with the requirements. Successful flutter tests have been performed by an academic flight group in Italy.

The Silent 2 Targa has extremely light ailerons, light elevator, generous rudder. The roll rate is quick because of the lively feel of the ailerons. Stall is predictable and recovery simple. In level flight, as airspeed is reduced when approaching the stall speed the sailplane vibrates a little, at this point decreasing the angle of attack results in airspeed increase and normal flight resume. From a climbing attitude the sailplane stalls decisively, the nose pitches down gently and recovery is easy with stick forward. Spin entry is obvious and recovered with rudder and stick.

== Variants ==
There are three versions of the Silent Gliders.

- The Silent Club version has 12 meter wingspan.
- The Silent 2 version has 13 meter wingspan.
- The Silent 2 Targa version has 13.3 meter wingspan and a special elevator.

== Specifications ==
General characteristics

- Crew: 1
- Length: 6.35 m (20 ft 10 in)
- Wingspan: 13.3 m (43 ft 7 in)
- Height: 1.25 m (4 ft 1 in)
- Wing area: 8.9 m^{2} (95.7 sq ft)
- Aspect ratio: 20.0
- Empty weight: 135 kg (298 lb)
- Gross weight: 300 kg (661 lb)

Performance

- Maximum speed: 220 km/h (140 mph, 119 kn)
- Cruise speed: 150 km/h (93 mph, 81 kn)
- Maximum glide ratio:
  - 40 at 90 km/h (49 knots)
  - 30 at 120 km/h (65 knots)
  - 20 at 150 km/h (81 knots)
- Rate of sink: 0.60 m/s (118 ft/min)
- Cockpit width 0.63 m (2.1 ft)
- Cockpit height 0.91 m (3 ft)
- Wing profile IMD 050 (16%)
- Wing loading 34 kg/m^{2} (6.96 lb/sq ft)
- Stall speed 64 km/h (35 knots)
- Roll rate 2.5 s at 80 km/h (43 knots)
  -45° to +45° bank
