= Budig glider =

German single-seat glider, 1921

Budig
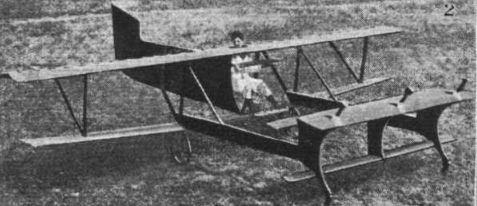
- Glider at the 1921 Rhön competition

General information
- Type: glider/powered glider
- National origin: Germany
- Designer: Friedrich Wilhelm Budig

History
- First flight: 1921

The unusual German Budig glider participated in the second (1921) Rhön competition, though without distinction. It was later fitted with a low power engine, making it probably the first powered glider.

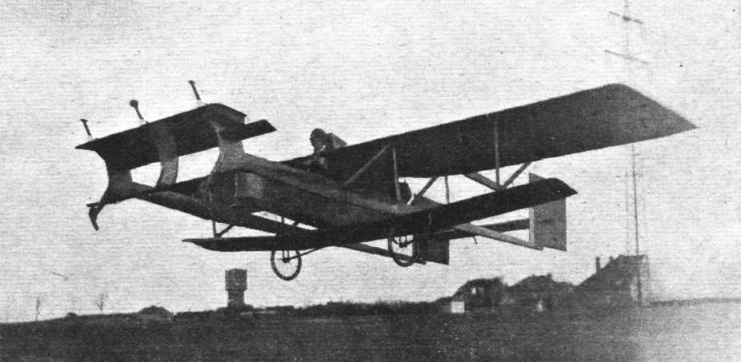
The 1923 motor glider in flight

== Design and development ==
The Budig glider was a single seat biplane or sesquiplane of unequal span and chord with three forward surfaces supported on a pair of box section booms. The upper foreplane was claimed to provide automatic stability and carried an elevator behind it, though Flight remarked that "It is difficult, from the illustration, to make out exactly what this arrangement is supposed to do." The pilot sat at the upper wing trailing edge, completely exposed at the front of a short central fuselage which supported a rectangular fin.

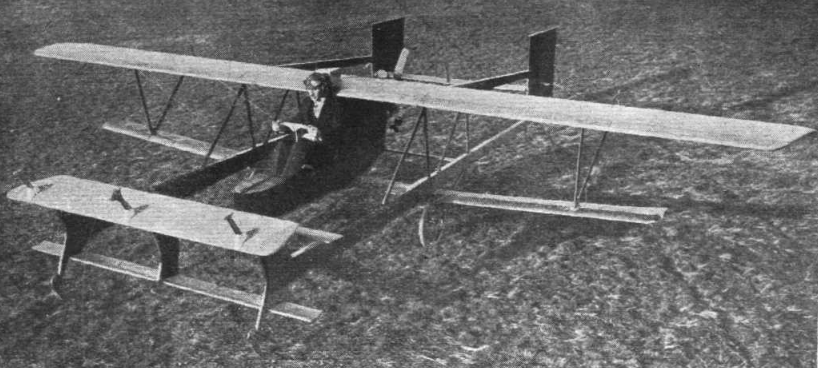
The motor glider

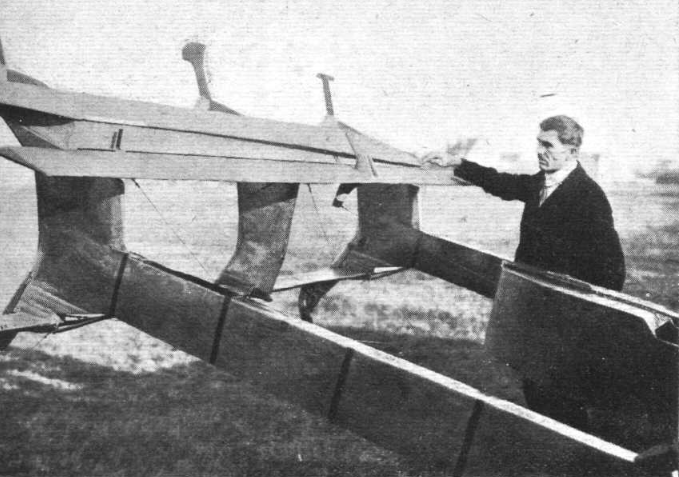
Foreplanes, nose and designer of the motor glider

By 1923 a small, 3 kW (4 hp) BMW horizontally opposed motorcycle engine had been added, mounted in pusher configuration behind the pilot who now sat at the leading edge of the upper wing behind a more substantial nose. It drove a very small diameter propeller. To accommodate the powerplant the central rear fuselage was replaced by rearward extensions of the booms, assisted by another, finer pair from the upper wings, which carried twin rectangular fins with a second elevator surface between them.

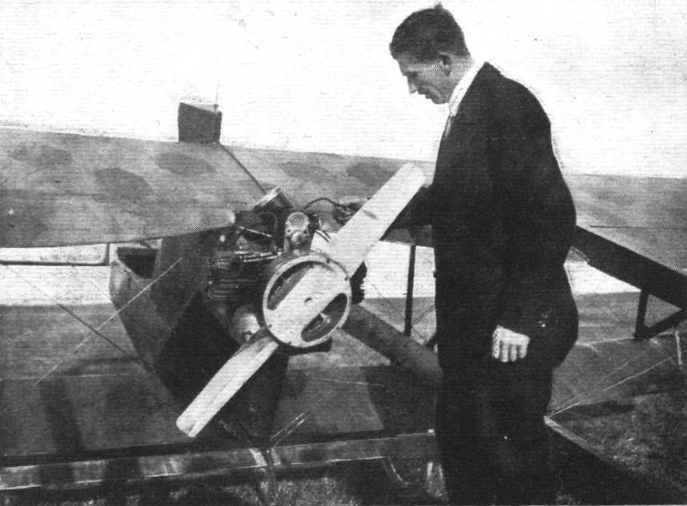
Engine and propeller

The little engine probably did not have enough power to get the Budig airborne but was used to maintain altitude or decrease the sink rate; launches were made with the usual bungee cord catapult. Nonetheless, Flight noted it as " probably the first glider with an auxiliary engine to fly".

== Specifications ==
Data from Flight, 4 January 1923

- Crew: One
- Wingspan: 6.50 m (21 ft 4 in) 1921 glider
- Powerplant: 1 × BMW horizontally opposed motorcycle engine, 3.0 kW (4 hp)
- Propellers: 2-bladed, 1 m (3 ft 3 in) diameter or less. Pusher.
