= Albastar Apis =

Single-seat Slovenian motor glider, 2000

Apis WR
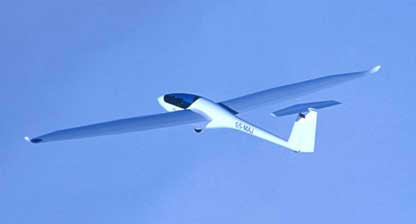

General information
- Type: Ultralight-class sailplane
- National origin: Slovenia
- Manufacturer: Albastar Ltd

History
- First flight: 2000
- Variants: Pipistrel Apis-Bee

The Albastar Apis WR is a single seater sailplane of Slovenian manufacture, the first aircraft created entirely by this manufacturer, Albastar Ltd. An Ultralight Class glider, it has set five world records in this class.

Often confused with the very similar Wezel Apis 2, the two designs are not related.

It is sold by Albastar ready-to-fly or kit-built.

== Specifications ==
General characteristics

- Crew: One pilot
- Length: 6.35 m (20 ft 10 in)
- Wingspan: 13.3 m (43 ft 8 in)
- Height: 1.25 m (4 ft 1 in)
- Wing area: 8.9 m^{2} (96 sq ft)
- Aspect ratio: 20.0
- Empty weight: 135 kg (298 lb)
- Gross weight: 300 kg (661 lb)

Performance

- Maximum speed: 220 km/h (137 mph, 119 kn)
- Maximum glide ratio: 40 at 90 km/h (56 mph)
- Rate of sink: 0.60 m/s (118 ft/min)
