= JLT Motors Ecoyota =

Family of French aeroengines

Ecoyota
- Type: Aircraft engine
- National origin: France
- Manufacturer: JLT Motors

The JLT Motors Ecoyota is a series of French aircraft engines, designed and produced by JLT Motors of Boos, Seine-Maritime for use in ultralight aircraft.

The company seems to have been founded about 2008 and gone out of business in 2010.

== Design and development ==
The engine is a three-cylinder, in-line, four-stroke, 998 cc (60.9 cu in) displacement, liquid-cooled, automotive-conversion petrol engine design, with a poly V belt reduction drive with a reduction ratio of 2.41:1. It employs electronic ignition and has a compression ratio of 10.5:1.

== Variants ==
Ecoyota 82
Model that produces 82 hp (61 kW)
Ecoyota 100
Model that produces 100 hp (75 kW)

== Applications ==
- Best Off Sky Ranger
- G1 Aviation G1
- ICP Savannah
- Zenith STOL CH 701

== Specifications (Ecoyota 100) ==
Data from Tacke

=== General characteristics ===
- Type: Three-cylinder, four stroke aircraft engine
- Bore: 71 mm (2.8 in)
- Stroke: 84 mm (3.3 in)
- Displacement: 998 cc (60.9 cu in)
- Length: 550 mm (21.7 in)
- Width: 620 mm (24.4 in)
- Height: 490 mm (19.3 in)
- Dry weight: 70 kg (154.3 lb)

=== Components ===
- Fuel type: petrol
- Cooling system: liquid
- Reduction gear: poly V belt

=== Performance ===
- Power output: 100 hp (75 kW)
- Compression ratio: 10.5:1

== See also ==
Related lists

- List of aircraft engines
