= Alisport Silent Club =

Silent Club
- A Silent Club towed by an Ultralight

General information
- Type: DU class sailplane
- National origin: Italy
- Manufacturer: Alisport

The Silent Club is a single seater sailplane of Italian manufacture. It is of the FAI type DU Class glider. It is sold by Alisport ready-to-fly or kit-built as pure glider or self-launching glider. The self-launching version is fitted with a single-blade propeller belt-driven by a two-stroke engine or optionally by an electric motor.

An electric version that used an electric motor to self launch (no tow plane needed was announced in 1997. It consisted of a 13 kW (17 hp) DC electric motor running on 40 kg (88 lb) of batteries with 1.4 kWh of energy. It is unknown whether any were actually built

The highly modified version, the Alisport Silent Club-J is a self-launching aerobatic jet motor glider shown on the U.S. airshow circuit and all over the world by Bob Carlton. It is powered by twin AMT-USA AT-450 jet engines (200 N (45 Lbf) of thrust each) originally developed for radio-controlled aircraft.

== Design and development ==
- The fuselage is carbon and glass fiber composite with epoxy resin.
- The wingspan is 12 meters without winglets.
- The flaperons stretch for 10.0 meters of the full wingspan.
- Schempp-Hirth-type spoilers extend on the upper wing surface only.
- Fixed or retractable main wheel behind the pilot, with shock absorber and drum brake activated via spoiler control lever aft travel.
- The Silent Club has light ailerons, light elevator, along with a generous rudder. The roll rate is quick due to the lively feel of the ailerons.
- Stall is predictable and recovery is simple. In level flight as airspeed is reduced when approaching the stall speed the sailplane vibrates a little, at this point decreasing the angle of attack results in airspeed increase and normal flight resumes, from a climbing attitude the sailplane stalls decisively, the nose pitches down gently and recovery is easy with stick forward.
- Spin entry is obvious and recovered with rudder and stick.

== Specifications ==
General characteristics

- Crew: One pilot
- Length: 6.35 m (20 ft 10 in)
- Wingspan: 12.00 m (39 ft 4 in)
- Height: 1.25 m (4 ft 1 in)
- Wing area: 10.3 m^{2} (111 sq ft)
- Aspect ratio: 14.0
- Empty weight: 125 kg (276 lb)
- Gross weight: 290 kg (639 lb)

Performance

- Maximum speed: 200 km/h (124 mph, 108 kn)
- Maximum glide ratio: 31 at 85 km/h (53 mph)
- Rate of sink: 0.70 m/s (138 ft/min)

== See also ==
Related development

- Alisport Silent 2
- Alisport Silent 2 Targa
