= Wezel Apis 2 =

Single-seat German motor glider

Apis 2

General information
- Type: Motor glider
- National origin: Germany
- Manufacturer: Wezel Flugzeugtechnik
- Status: In production

History
- First flight: 2002

The Wezel Apis 2 is a German mid-wing, T-tailed, single-seat motor glider that was designed and produced by Wezel Flugzeugtechnik. It first flew in 2002.

Often confused with the very similar Albastar Apis, the two designs are not related.

The rights to the Apis 2 design were sold to Yuneec International of China in 2011 with the intention of selling only an electric version. Wezel announced in June 2012 that the move of production had been delayed indefinitely.

== Design and development ==
The Apis 2 is a retractable engine motor glider that is powered by a 28 hp (21 kW) Hirth F-33 single cylinder, two-stroke powerplant, fitted with a tractor propeller. The engine is retracted into a bay behind the cockpit for soaring flight. The Apis 2 is built predominantly of composites. The 15 m (49.2 ft) span wing features winglets and produces a 39:1 glide ratio. The landing gear is a retractable monowheel gear.

In 2003 the aircraft was offered for €50,950 complete.

== Specifications (Apis 2) ==
Data from World Directory of Leisure Aviation 2003-04

General characteristics

- Crew: one
- Wingspan: 15.00 m (49 ft 3 in)
- Wing area: 12.4 m^{2} (133 sq ft)
- Gross weight: 300 kg (661 lb)

Performance

- Stall speed: 60 km/h (37 mph, 32 kn)
- Never exceed speed: 200 km/h (120 mph, 110 kn)
- Maximum glide ratio: 39:1
- Rate of sink: 0.6 m/s (120 ft/min)
- Wing loading: 24.2 kg/m^{2} (5.0 lb/sq ft)

== See also ==
- List of gliders
