= 2021 TP21 =

Near-Earth asteroid

2021 TP_{21}
Discovery
- Discovered by: Mount Lemmon Survey
- Discovery date: 11 October 2021

Designations
- Minor planet category: NEO; Apollo; PHA

Orbital characteristics
- Epoch 2025-Nov-21 (JD 2461000.5)
- Uncertainty parameter 0
- Observation arc: 2969 days (8.13 years)
- Aphelion: 4.2251 AU (Q)
- Perihelion: 0.8120 AU (q)
- Semi-major axis: 2.5186 AU (a)
- Eccentricity: 0.6776 (e)
- Orbital period (sidereal): 3.9971 years
- Mean anomaly: 353.78° (M)
- Inclination: 25.417° (i)
- Longitude of ascending node: 8.0518° (Ω)
- Argument of perihelion: 116.32° (ω)
- Earth MOID: 0.0331 AU (4.95 million km)
- Jupiter MOID: 1.769 AU (264.6 million km)

Physical characteristics
- Dimensions: ~300 m (1,000 ft); 240–540 meters
- Absolute magnitude (H): 20.22

2021 TP_{21} is an Apophis-sized asteroid that was discovered on 11 October 2021 when it was 0.5 AU (75 million km) from Earth. This potentially hazardous asteroid (PHA) spends most or its orbit closer to 4 AU (600 million km) from the Sun as objects orbit more slowly when near aphelion (furthest distance from the Sun). 2021 TP_{21} was rated with a Torino scale of 1 from 31 October 2021 to 4 November 2021 for a potential impact on 27 March 2081. As the observation arc became longer the nominal distance from Earth became further on the potential impact date.

Nominal approach getting further from Earth with longer observation arc (27 March 2081 virtual impactor)
Observation arc (in days)	JPL Horizons nominal geocentric distance (AU)	uncertainty region (3-sigma)	Impact probability (1 in)	Torino scale
17	0.17 AU (25 million km)	± 1.5 billion km	100000	0
19	1.4 AU (210 million km)	± 870 million km	50000	1
57	2.5 AU (370 million km)	± 18 million km	0	0

== See also ==
- 2022 AE1
