= Motor glider =

Glider equipped with a motor for launch

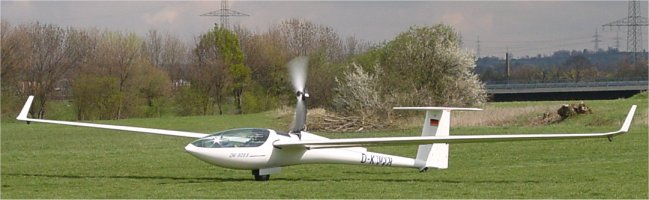
DG-808B 18m self-launching

A motor glider is a fixed-wing aircraft that can be flown with or without engine power. The FAI Gliding Commission Sporting Code definition is: a fixed-wing aerodyne equipped with a means of propulsion (MoP), capable of sustained soaring flight without thrust from the means of propulsion.

== History ==
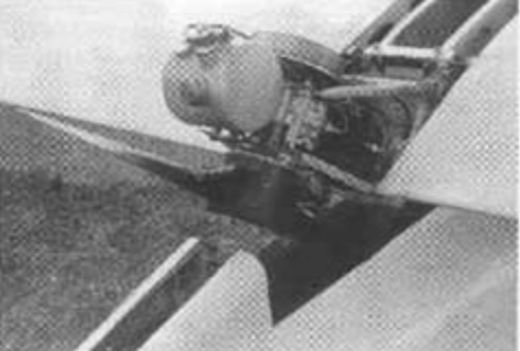
Carden-Baynes Auxiliary engine

In 1935, an occasional or auxiliary motor that could be retracted was suggested by Sir John Carden. This was incorporated into the Carden-Baynes Auxiliary that first flew on 8 August of the same year. A later version of the Budig glider was powered.

== Categories ==
Most motor gliders are equipped with a propeller, which may be fixed, feathered (e.g. AMS-Flight Carat), or retractable. However jet engine-powered motorgliders are now available from some manufacturers, some of which are intended for use only as "sustainer" engines, i.e. for sustaining gliding flight rather than as self-launching aircraft.

=== Sustainer motor gliders ===
Sustainer motor gliders must be launched like an unpowered glider, but can climb slowly to extend a flight once the engine is deployed and started. They generally do not have an alternator or starter motor, so the engine is started by "wind-milling" the propeller in flight. The propeller may be a rigid 2-blade design, or may have more than two blades that fold at the hub when the engine is retracted. The propeller hub is usually attached directly to the crankshaft, but there is at least one example of a sustainer with a belt reduction drive, the DG Flugzeugbau DG-1000T.

The smaller sustainer engines are usually not equipped with a throttle, but instead have a cable to open decompression valves in each cylinder to allow the engine to turn freely for starting. Sustainer engines are typically two-stroke two-cylinder air-cooled engines in the range of 18–30 hp (14–22 kW). They are lighter in weight, and simpler to operate than self-launching powerplants.

=== Self-launching motor gliders ===
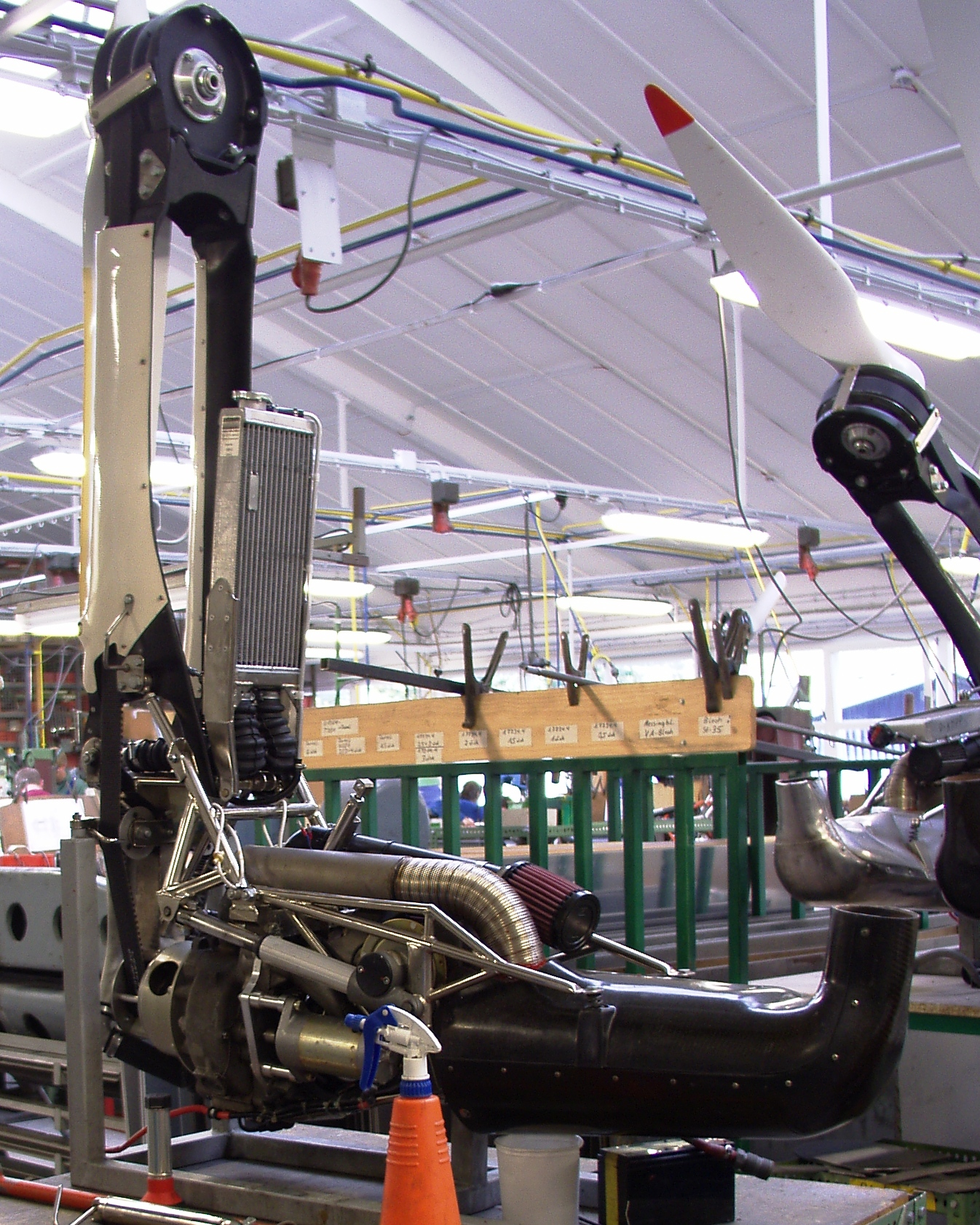
Powerplant from a Schleicher ASH 26E self-launching motor glider, mounted on a test stand for maintenance at Alexander Schleicher in Poppenhausen, Germany. Counter-clockwise from top left: propeller hub, mast with belt guide, radiator, Wankel engine, muffler shroud.

Self-launching retractable propeller motor gliders have sufficient thrust and initial climb rate to take off without assistance, or they may be launched as with a conventional glider. The engines also have a starter motor and a large battery to allow the engine to be started on the ground, and an alternator to recharge the battery. A two-blade propeller is typically coupled to the engine via a belt reduction drive. In older designs, the propeller alignment must be checked by the pilot using a mirror, before it is retracted into the fuselage; however in current production gliders, propeller alignment is fully automatic.

Another solution is the single-blade propeller that offers the advantage of a smaller opening in the fuselage to retract the engine.

Internal combustion engines can benefit from mounting in the fuselage, rather than on the propeller mast. This allows them to be connected to a larger muffler for reduced noise when operating, something which is mostly relevant to European operation. It also allows the belt tension to be relieved when the engine is retracted to extend the life of the belt and bearings. The drawback of this arrangement is that engines fixed low in fuselages are more difficult to pre-flight and service, and highly stressed power transmission belts should not be bent or twisted.

Self-launching engines are equipped with a throttle that allows the engine power to be adjusted for ground operations. Self-launching engines are typically in the range of 50–60 hp (38–45 kW). The higher engine output power requires liquid cooling with a separate radiator mounted on the propeller mast. Engines commonly used are two-stroke piston engines, or Wankel rotary engines.

=== Touring motor gliders ===
Motor with fixed or full feathering propellers are generally classified as Touring Motor Gliders (TMGs). TMGs can take off and cruise like an airplane or soar with power off, like a glider.

They are fitted with front-mounted engines, similar to a small airplane. The large wingspans of TMGs provide a moderate gliding performance, not as good as that of unpowered gliders. However TMGs are more efficient than conventional light aircraft.

Most TMGs are designed with engines of 80 to 100 hp (75 kW) and typically cruise (under power) at 85–100 knots (190 km/h). Most have fuel tanks capable of holding between 50 and 100 liters (13 to 26 US gallons) of fuel, giving a range under power of up to 450 nautical miles (approximately 830 kilometers). Modern TMGs like the Phoenix Air Phoenix are capable of higher speeds and longer range under power.

Some TMGs are equipped with folding wings to allow them to fit in standard small airplane T-hangars. Tow hooks are unnecessary, since aircraft with self-launch ability do not require access to winch or tow plane for launching like a conventional glider.

Some TMGs, like the Europa or the Phoenix, can also be supplied with interchangeable wings or wingtips so that they can be flown as a standard touring aircraft as well as a TMG.

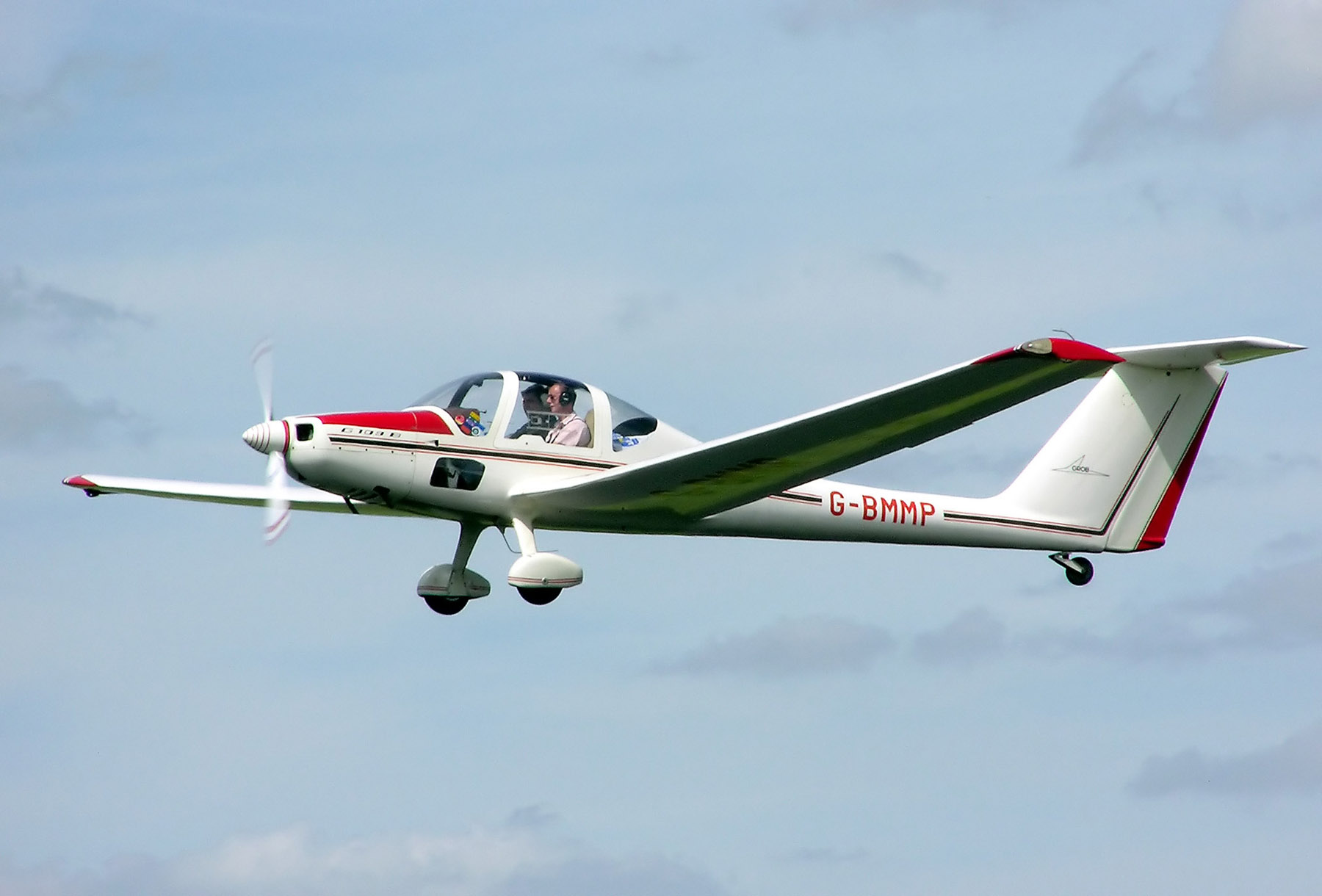
Grob G 109B touring motor glider, with fibre-reinforced plastic construction.

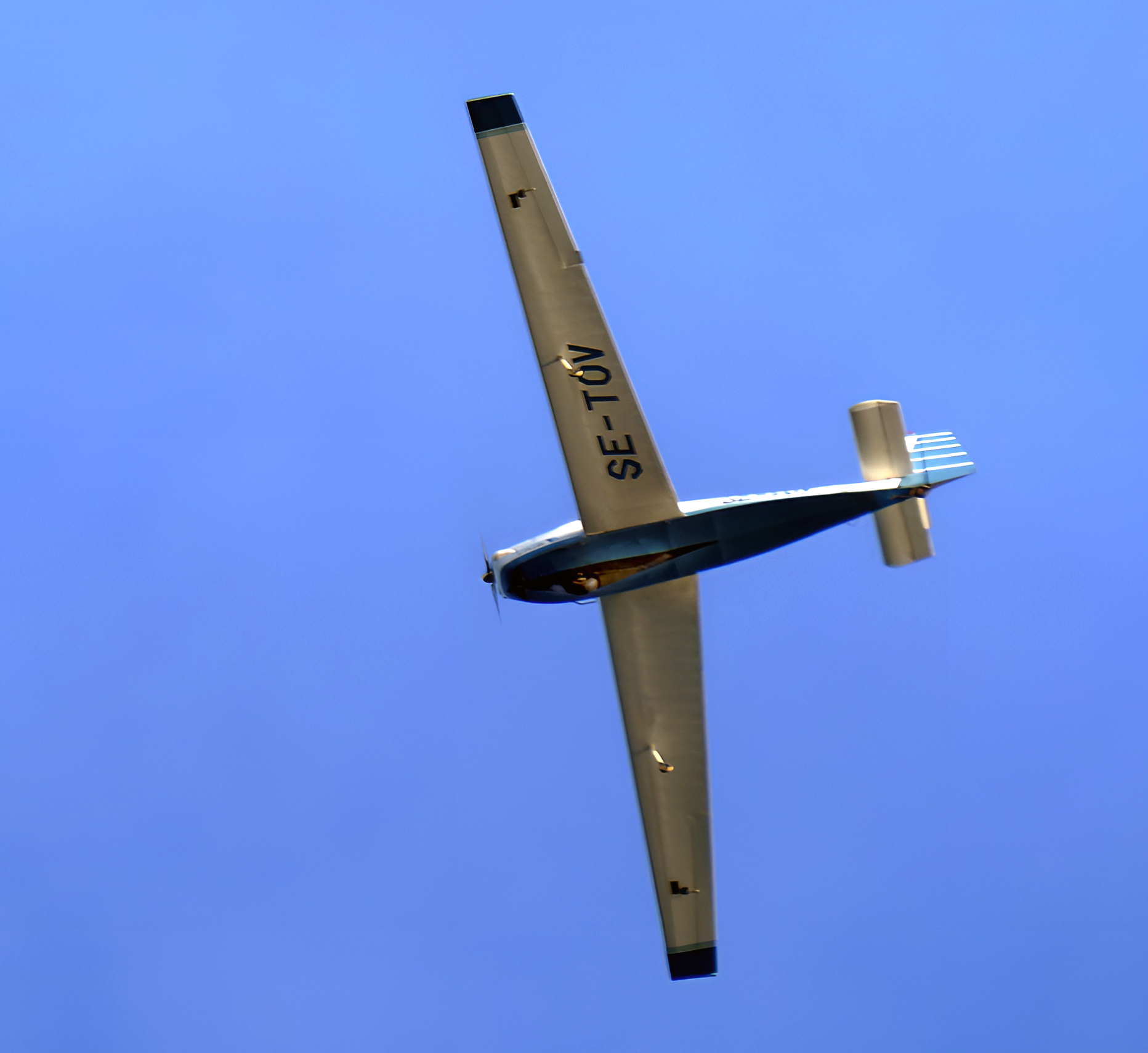
Motor glider SF25 Motorfalke over Ystad 2020.

The landing gear configuration on TMGs usually incorporates two fixed main wheels, allowing it to be taxied on the ground without a wing walker. While some TMGs have only one main wheel, with auxiliary trolley wheels on the wings for taxiing, it is becoming more common to find them being manufactured with tricycle and conventional (two fixed main wheels – i.e. a "tail-dragger") landing gear configurations.

Since the additional drag of the stopped propeller and landing gear reduces their gliding performance, TMGs are seldom used in competition.

== Motor configurations ==
=== Retractable propeller ===
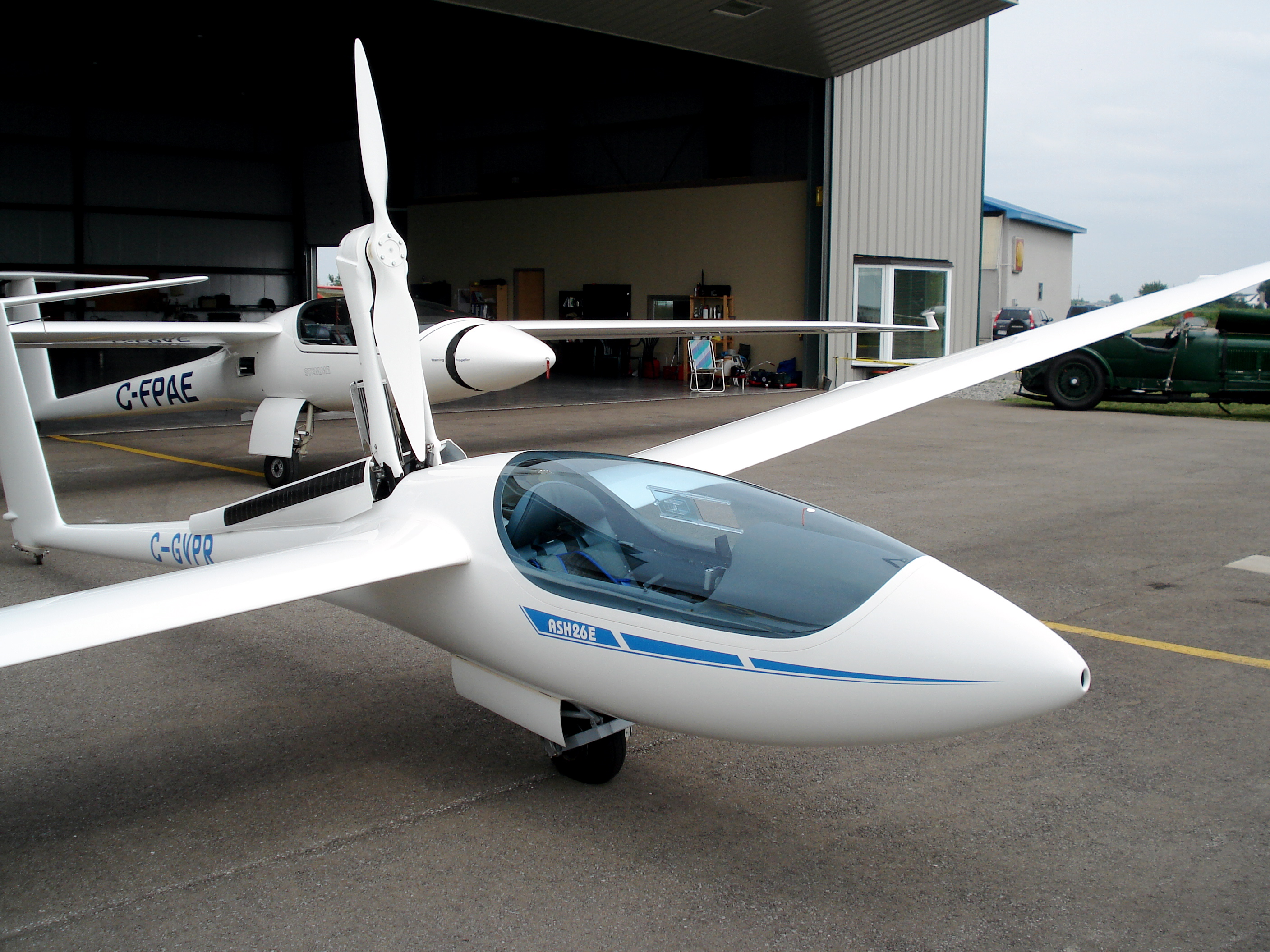
Schleicher ASH 26e self-launching motor glider, with the engine mast extended. A Stemme S10 is in the background with the nose cone extended.

The retractable propeller is usually mounted on a mast that rotates up and forward out of the fuselage, aft of the cockpit and wing carry-through structure. The fuselage has engine bay doors that open and close automatically, similar to landing gear doors. The engine may be near the top or bottom of the mast, and newer designs have the engine fixed in the fuselage to reduce noise and drag.

Unlike TMGs, most gliders with retractable propellers are also fitted with a tow-hook for aero-towing or ground launch. They have a single-axle retractable main wheel on the fuselage like most unpowered gliders, so they do require assistance during ground operations. The two-stroke engines commonly used are not efficient at reduced power for level cruising flight, and instead must use a "saw-tooth" flight profile where the glider climbs at full power, then glides with the propeller retracted.

=== Cross-over ===
On the Stemme S10, the propeller folds into the nose cone, and is connected to the rear-mounted engine with a drive shaft. It also has two retractable main wheels, allowing it to be taxied without assistance, and to soar with low drag. These features make it a cross-over between the touring and retractable propeller motor gliders. It does not have a tow-hook, so it must self-launch. The S10-VT variant has a two-position variable-pitch propeller and a turbocharger on the engine, which allows the aircraft to cruise at altitudes up to 30,000 feet (9,000 m).

On the AMS Carat, the propeller folds forward, pointing straight ahead like a spear.

=== Electric ===
Although most motor gliders have gasoline-fueled internal combustion engines, a number of electric-powered self-launchers have been developed including the Lange Antares 20E and 23E, Schempp-Hirth Arcus E, Schleicher AS 34Me, Pipistrel Taurus Electro G2, Silent 2 Targa LE (Lithium Electric), and the closely related Air Energy AE1 Silent, Yuneec Apis 2, Yuneec EViva, Alpaero Exel, Aériane Swift, Electravia and Alatus AL12. Some types use a pylon behind the cockpit to extend a propeller. 11 different types, from 7 manufacturers, such as the Alisport Silent 2 Electro, use the front electric sustainer (FES) system with a folding propeller in the nose.

Advantages of electric power over gasoline include:

- Faster and more reliable transition from gliding to powered flight, as the time and risk required to start and warm up an internal combustion engine is eliminated. For example, the Antares 20E transitions from gliding to powered flight in under 12 seconds. With a FES system maximum power can be available in 1–2 seconds.
- For types that use a pylon, lower drag and sink rate are achieved with the pylon extended and the motor not running, as there is no radiator as required to cool a gasoline engine. For FES systems, the drag from the folded propeller in the nose is negligible if the engine does not start. For safe operation, the "Engine out and not running" performance is used to plan in-air restarts in the event of a problem (even for electrics). The reduced sink-rate of electric-powered motor-gliders "engine out and not running" allows a lower altitude for a safe in-air restart.
- For types that use a pylon, belt reduction drive and associated reliability issues are eliminated. As an electric motor can turn at a lower RPM than typical gasoline engines, it can be mounted at the top of the mast without a reduction system, eliminating belt-drive issues.
- Greatly reduced noise, allowing take-off from locations where other powered aircraft are not permitted.

Disadvantages of current electric powered motor-gliders as compared to gasoline include:

- Reduced range or climb altitude, as the energy stored per unit weight for available batteries is less than gasoline.
- Gliders with pylon-mounted electric motors are slightly heavier than those with gasoline engines due to the batteries. An FES system weighs about the same as a two-stroke engine.
- Increased cost. While electric motors are comparably inexpensive, low-weight batteries suitable for motor-gliders are a little more expensive than gasoline engines.

Electric sustainer systems (with power to sustain flight but not self-launch) are optional for the Schempp-Hirth Ventus-3, HPH Shark and ESAG LAK-17B. These three all use the FES as used for self-launching lighter gliders, such as the Alisport Silent 2.

=== Jet ===
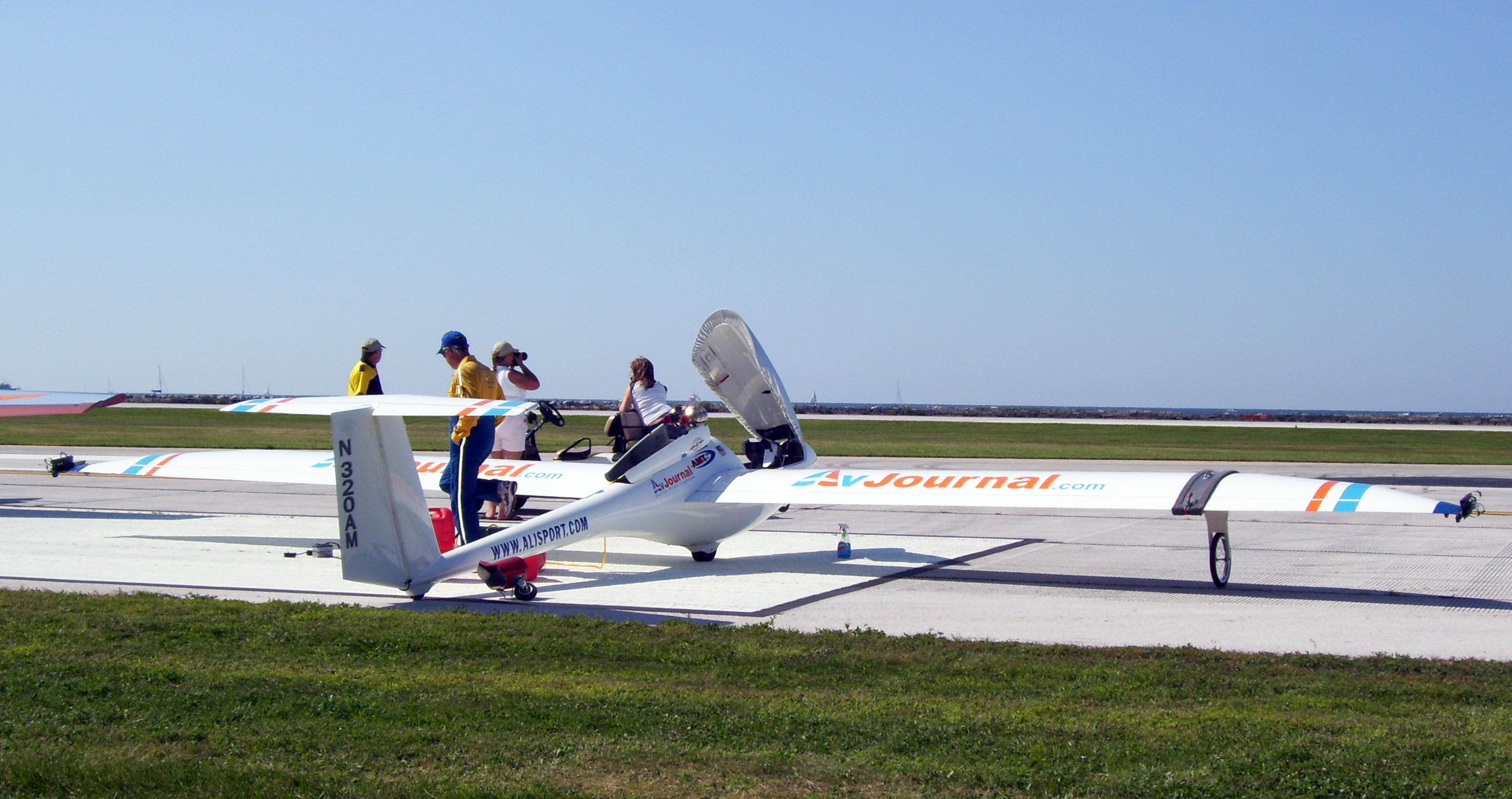
Bob Carlton's jet-powered glider.

The first production self-launching motor glider fitted with a jet engine was the Caproni Vizzola Calif. The jet engine was mounted inside the fuselage behind the wing, with fixed intake and exhaust ducts coupled to the outside air stream for engine operation. Since then a new generation of jets have been offered for the Schempp-Hirth Ventus 2, Jonker JS-1 Revelation and the HpH 304, all featuring sustainer jet engines.

Other self-launching types include the experimental LET L-13TJ Blaník, a version of the Alisport Silent Club and a version of the TeST TST-14 Bonus.

== Use of engines in self-launching sailplanes ==
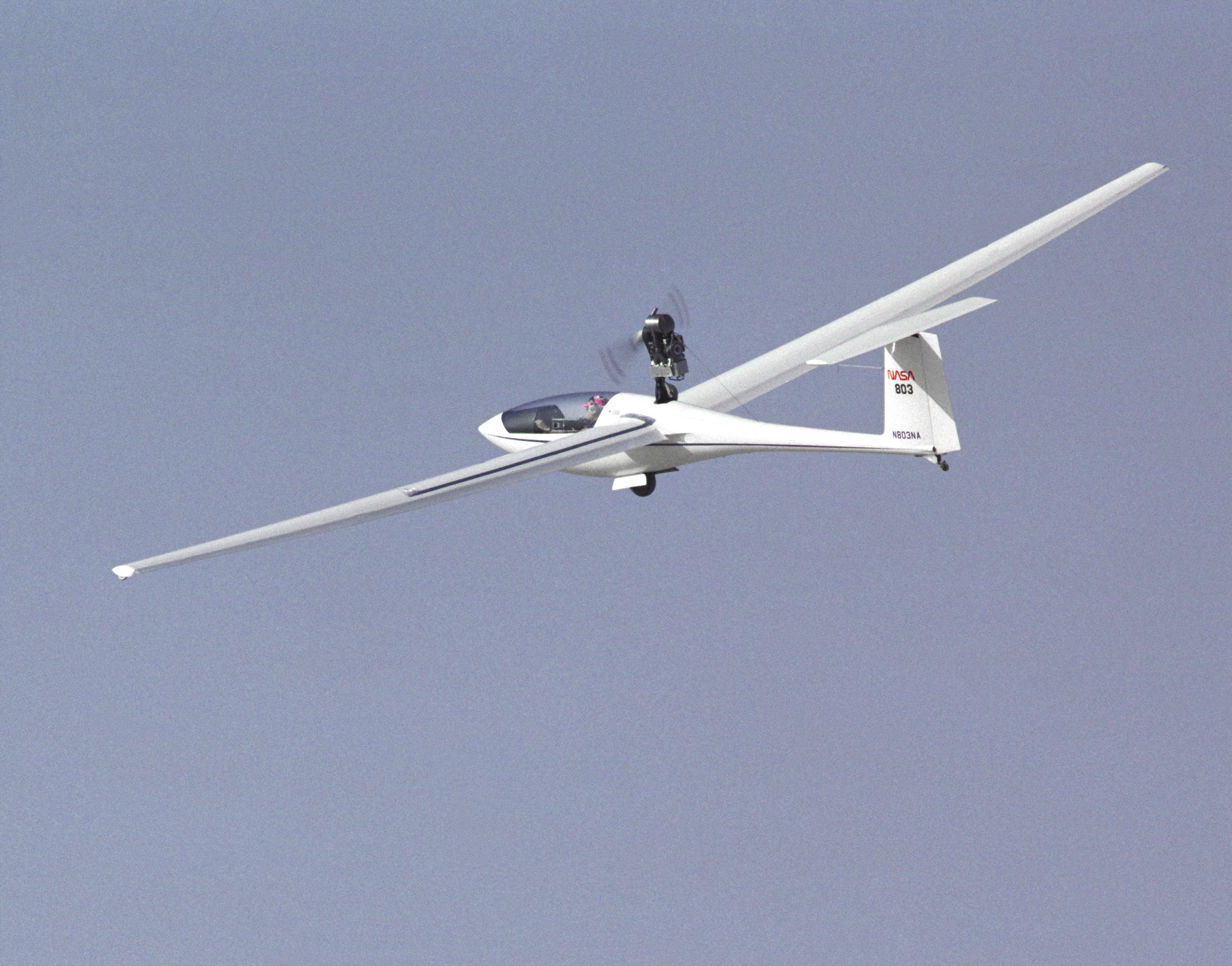
A self-launching Eiri-Avion PIK-20E in flight with engine running.

The engine cannot always be relied upon to start in flight, so the pilot must allow for this possibility. The generally accepted practice is to get in position for landing at a suitable airport, or off-airport out-landing field, before extending the propeller and attempting an engine start. This allows for a safe landing in the event that the engine cannot be started in time.

In soaring competitions, starting the engine is usually scored the same as an out-landing in an unpowered glider. To detect the use of the engine, GNSS Flight Recorders used in motor gliders must have a noise sensor that allows recording the sound level along with position and altitude. In many competitions, the rules require that the pilot start the engine at the beginning of the flight, before starting the task, to ensure an engine start later in the flight will be detected.

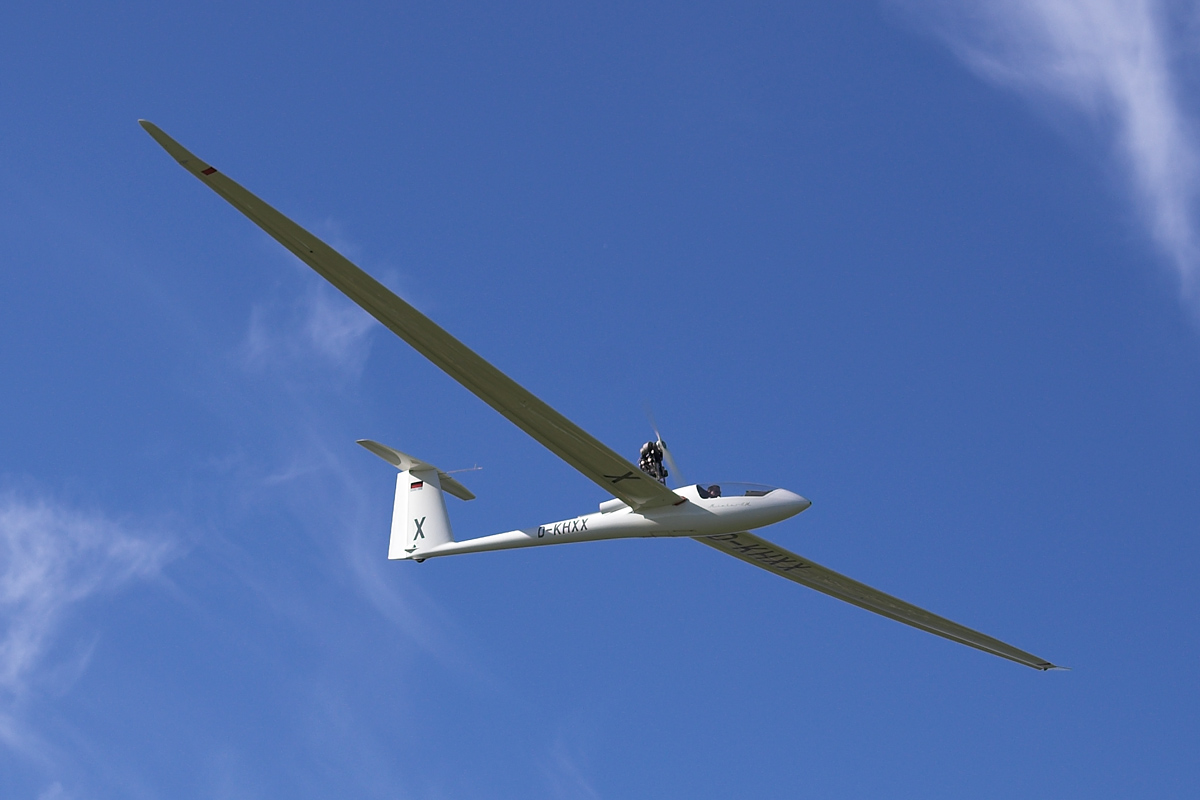
Schempp-Hirth Nimbus 4M with engine running.

Gliders without an engine are lighter and, as they do not need a safety margin for an engine-start, they can safely thermal at lower altitudes in weaker conditions. So, pilots in unpowered gliders may complete competition flights when some powered competitors cannot. Conversely, motor glider pilots can start the engine to extend a flight if conditions will no longer support soaring, while unpowered gliders will have to land out, away from the home airfield, requiring retrieval by road using the glider's trailer.

The presence of an engine can increase the safety of gliding, as a powerplant increases the ability of the pilot to avoid storms and off-airport landings. An opposing view is that motor gliders are against the spirit of the sport, and, more importantly, that they sometimes give pilots a false sense of security.

Touring motor gliders are seldom used in competition, but they can be useful in training for cross-country flights. After take-off, the engine is switched off, and the trainee flies the aircraft as a glider. Landings in unfamiliar fields can be practiced while the motor idles. If the trainee chooses an inappropriate field, or misjudges the approach, the instructor can apply power and climb away safely.

== Licenses or certificates ==
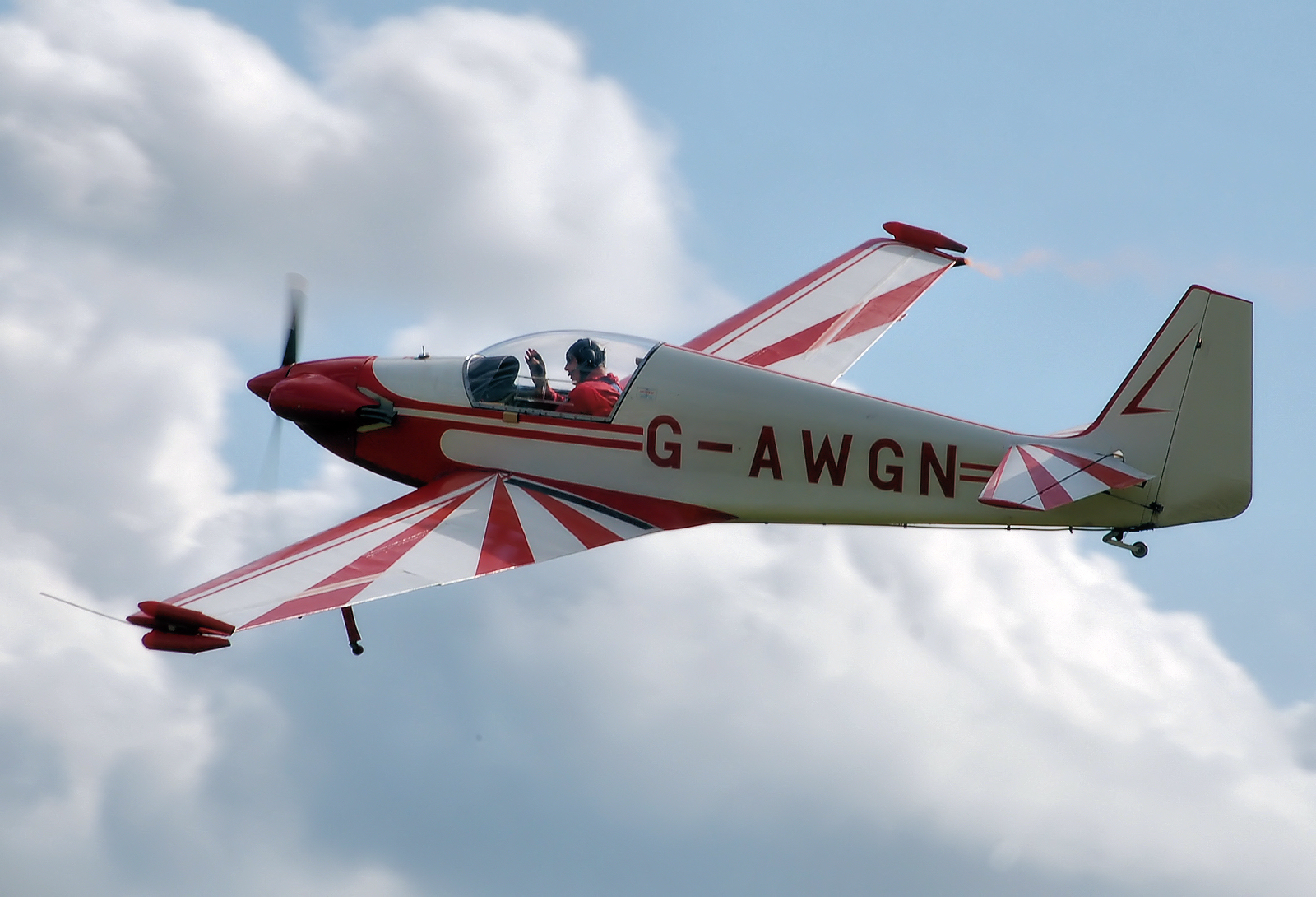
Fournier RF 4D in England (2009).

In Europe, powered gliders are categorized into gliders with retractable propellers/engines, which can be flown with an ordinary glider pilot license (GPL), and touring motor gliders (TMG), which require a license extension to the standard GPL. In the United Kingdom, where gliding is regulated by the British Gliding Association, pilots of self-sustaining gliders, like those of pure gliders, do not have to be licensed with the United Kingdom Civil Aviation Authority.

In South Africa, Touring Motor Glider (TMG) is an independent National Pilots License category under Recreation Aviation, Part 62, subpart 17.

In the United States, a private glider pilot certificate allows the pilot to fly unpowered gliders, self-launching motor gliders (including touring motor gliders and gliders with retractable engines or propellers), and sustainer motor gliders. An instructor must provide instruction and sign the logbook of the pilot to authorize the launch method, which may be by airplane towing, ground launch (winches, bungee, auto tow), or, in the case of a suitable motor glider, by self-launching. In the US, motor gliders are classified as gliders, and may be operated by a glider pilot without the medical certificate required to operate an airplane.

In the United States, a powered glider may be certified for up to two occupants, up to 850 kg maximum weight, and with a maximum ratio of weight to wing span squared of 3 kg/m^{2}. Similar requirements exist in European JAA/EASA regulations, at a maximum weight of 750 kg.

In Canada, a glider pilot license allows the pilot to fly gliders, including powered gliders. Self-launching is considered a method of launch and therefore carries the same requirements as winch launching or aerotowing: a logbook endorsement from an instructor and three solo launches by the same method before carrying passengers.

== See also ==
- Powered hang glider
- Powered paraglider
