= Variable-position horizontal stabilizer =

5 position trim system.

A variable-position horizontal stabilizer changes the pitch simultaneously with the flaperon setting.
Normally the horizontal stabilizer also known as tailplane is fixed and has a hinged elevator, a stabilator is another method that combines the functions of an elevator and a horizontal stabilizer.
The variable-position horizontal stabilizer is governed by the flaperon setting: the settings of the flaperon control produce corresponding changes to the stabilizer angle of incidence, thus defining the trim airspeed in relation to the flaperon requirements. The conventional elevator remains in trail, minimizing trim drag. Flaperon settings are used to optimize the lift and drag of a wing. When the flight requires low speed the flaperons are in a positive position and when the flight requires high speed flaperons are in a negative position.

== Sources ==
- https://web.archive.org/web/20070418051732/http://www.glidingmagazine.com/FeatureArticle.asp?id=368
- https://web.archive.org/web/20070202111444/http://www.alisport.com/eu/images/img_news/Volaresett04/VOLARE_SETT04.htm
