= Schleicher AS 34Me =

German motor glider, 2020

AS 34Me
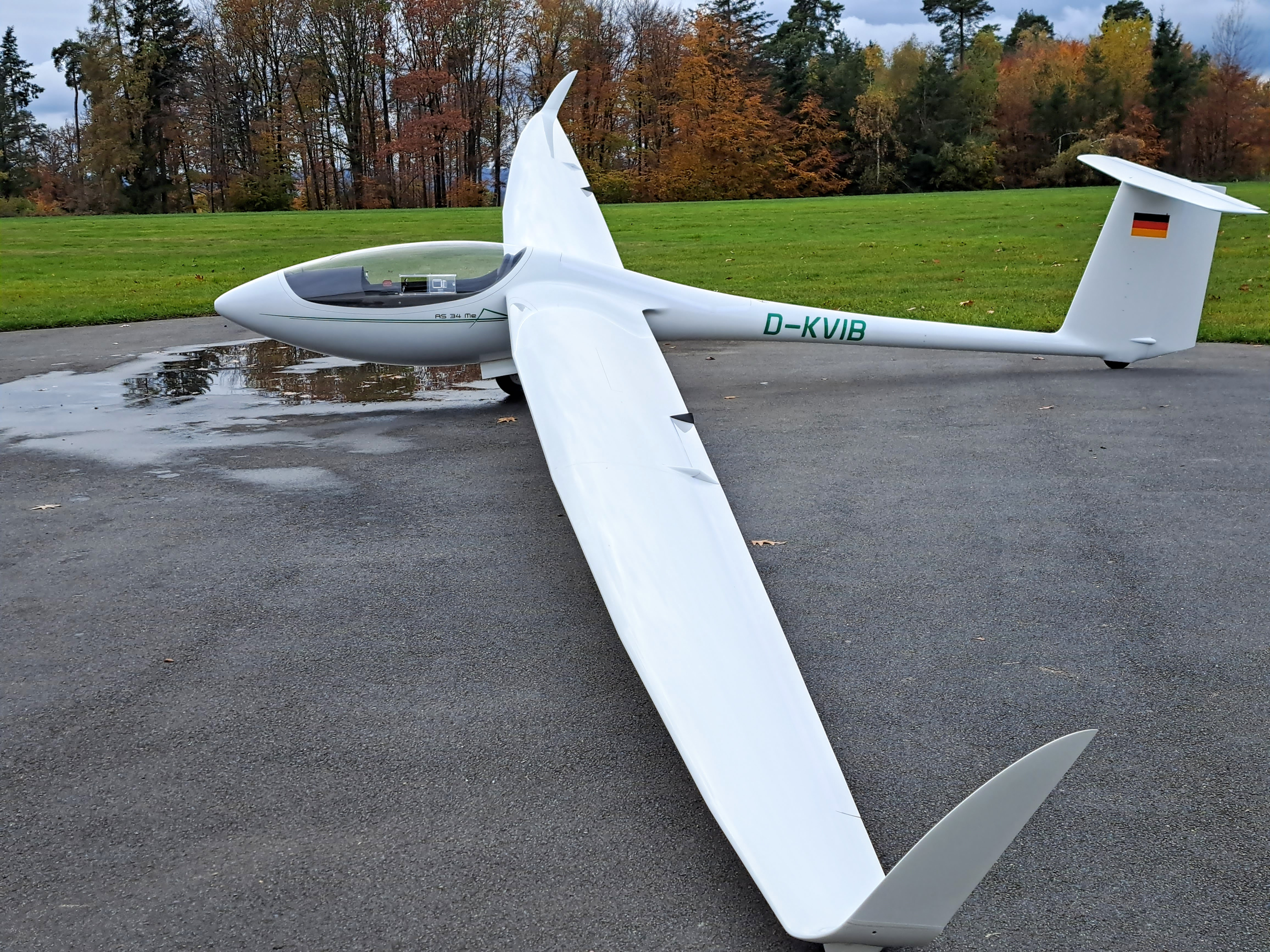

General information
- Type: Standard Class and 18 metre-class
- National origin: Germany
- Manufacturer: Schleicher

History
- First flight: September 2020

The Schleicher AS 34Me is a German glider manufactured by Alexander Schleicher. It is a self-launcher that uses an electrical propulsion system.

== Design and development ==
The AS 34Me is a single-seat, mid-wing sailplane of composite construction, with a retractable monowheel landing gear and a T-tail. The design is based upon the ASW 28, with an unflapped wing. It can be flown with an 18 m (59 ft) span and 11.9 m^{2} (128 sq ft) area or a 15 m (49 ft) span and 10.5 m^{2} (113 sq ft). The power unit has already been used in Schleicher ASG 32 EI, except the batteries are mounted in the wings rather than the fuselage.

The AS 34Me has an air-cooled EMRAX motor with 35 kW maximum and 25 kW continuous power output and a completely retractable propeller, unlike front electric sustainer (FES) units used on gliders such as the Schempp-Hirth Ventus-3. The battery has a capacity of 8.6kWh. The manufacturer claims a maximum rate of climb at take-off of 3.7 m/s (728 ft/min). The remaining propulsion capacity after a take-off to 600 m (with a gross weight of 477 kg) will provide a further rate of climb of 2.5 m/s (492 ft/min) to an altitude of 2200 m (7200 ft) and a range of 125 km (77 mi) using a "climb and glide" method. The glider can be flown in the Standard class or in the 18 metre Class.

== Specifications (with 18m wings) ==
Data from Schleicher.

General characteristics

- Crew: one
- Wingspan: 18.00 m (59 ft 0 in)
- Wing area: 11.9 m^{2} (128 sq ft)
- Aspect ratio: 27.3
- Empty weight: 387 kg (853 lb)
- Gross weight: 575 kg (1,268 lb)

Performance

- Maximum glide ratio: 48
- Rate of climb: 3.7 m/s (730 ft/min)
- Rate of sink: 0.57 m/s (112 ft/min)

== See also ==
- List of gliders
