= 2022 AE1 =

Near-Earth asteroid for 2023

2022 AE_{1}
Discovery
- Discovered by: Mount Lemmon Survey
- Discovery site: Mount Lemmon Obs.
- Discovery date: 6 January 2022

Designations
- Minor planet category: NEO; Apollo

Orbital characteristics
- Epoch 2025-Nov-21 (JD 2461000.5)
- Uncertainty parameter 0
- Observation arc: 542 days (1.48 years)
- Aphelion: 2.2723 AU (Q)
- Perihelion: 0.6675 AU (q)
- Semi-major axis: 1.4699 AU (a)
- Eccentricity: 0.5459 (e)
- Orbital period (sidereal): 1.7821 years
- Mean anomaly: 93.344° (M)
- Inclination: 6.2985° (i)
- Longitude of ascending node: 102.18° (Ω)
- Time of perihelion: 2025 June 5
- Argument of perihelion: 268.38° (ω)
- Earth MOID: 0.000354 AU (53.0 thousand km)
- Jupiter MOID: 3.2003 AU (478.76 million km)

Physical characteristics
- Mean diameter: ~70 m (200 ft); 54–120 meters
- Absolute magnitude (H): 23.49

2022 AE_{1} is a Tunguska event-sized asteroid, classified as a near-Earth object of the Apollo group, approximately 70 meters (230 feet) in diameter. It was discovered by the Mount Lemmon Survey on 6 January 2022, when it was 0.09 AU (13 million km) from Earth. On 9 January 2022 with an observation arc of 3 days, it was rated with a Torino scale of 1 for a virtual impactor on 4 July 2023 16:28 UTC. (Note: Earth traveling at 30 km/s and with a diameter of 12,800 km, only blocks the path of the asteroid for about 8 minutes (30 km/s * 60 sec * 8 min).) Nominal approach is expected to occur 1 July 2023 01:13 ± 1 day. (Note: The JPL Small-Body Database close approach table lists a linearized uncertainty. Sentry computations explore alternate orbit solutions along the line of variations and account for orbit propagation nonlinearities.) With a Palermo scale rating of as high as –0.66 at the European Space Agency on 11 January 2022, the odds of impact peaked at about 4.6 (Note: 10^{0.66} = 4.57. JPL's Sentry Risk Table, ESA's Risk List and NEODyS will all list slightly different odds of impact and Palermo scale values.) times less than the background hazard level. (Note: "Background risk" is defined as the average risk posed by objects of the same size or larger over the years until the date of the potential impact.) NEODyS was the first risk-page to drop to Torino scale 0 on 12 January 2022 followed by ESA on 13 January 2022, but by January 14 both returned to Torino scale 1. On 14 January 2022 the waxing gibbous moon was as little as 3 degrees from the asteroid delaying observations of the asteroid from January 12–19. On 20 January 2022 with a 16-day observation arc, using JPL #11 the Sentry Risk Table dropped the asteroid to Torino scale 0 and then later that day JPL #12 resulted in it being removed from the risk table.

2022 AE1 nominal approach for 4 July 2023 virtual impactor
Observation arc (in days)	JPL Horizons nominal geocentric distance (AU)	uncertainty region (3-sigma)	Impact probability (1 in)	Torino scale
2.9	0.024 AU (3.6 million km)	± 38 million km	2900	1
5.9	0.043 AU (6.4 million km)	± 31 million km	1800	1
7.1	0.043 AU (6.4 million km)	± 22 million km	1500	1
7.9	0.066 AU (9.9 million km)	± 20 million km	2800	1
8.1	0.039 AU (5.8 million km)	± 12 million km	1700	1
16.1	0.053 AU (7.9 million km)	± 7 million km	71000	0
16.1 (JPL #12)	0.059 AU (8.8 million km)	± 5 million km	0	0
20	0.072 AU (10.8 million km)	± 4 million km	0	0

2022 AE_{1} 2023 Earth/Moon approach JPL #15 (20-day arc) Uncertainty: ± 1 day and ± 3.5 million km
Date & Time	Approach to	Nominal distance
2023-Jul-01 01:13 ± 1 day	Earth	9246404 km
2023-Jul-01 03:44	Moon	9463958 km

It came to perihelion (closest approach to the Sun) on 10 November 2021, and then approached Earth from the direction of the Sun making closest Earth approach on 31 December 2021 at distance of about 10 million km.

== See also ==
- 2021 TP21
- 2022 BX1
