= Front electric sustainer =

Propulsion system

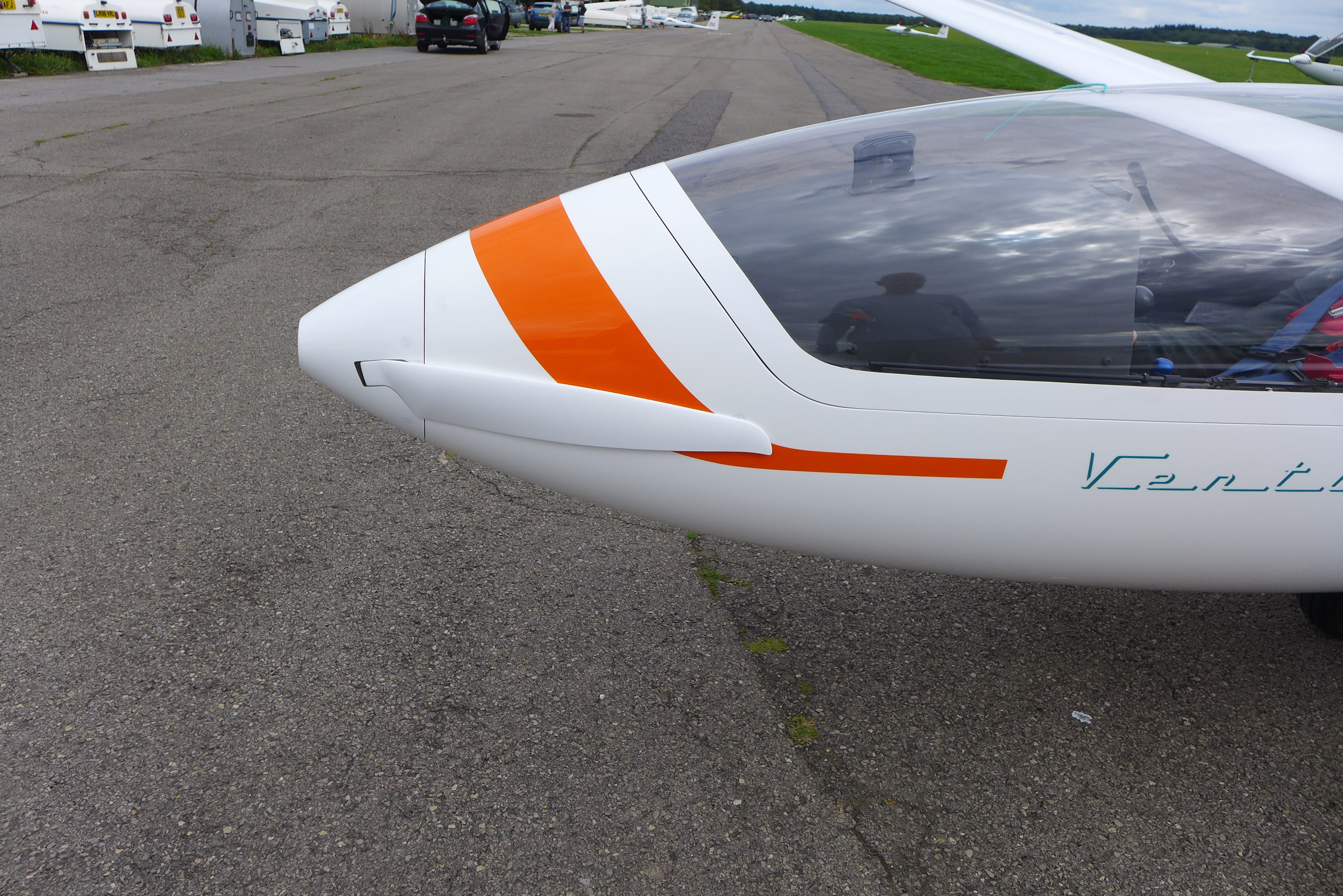
Glider showing propeller of FES electric sustainer

Front electric sustainer (FES) is a propulsion system for gliders that uses an electric motor powered by batteries and a foldable propeller. It is produced by LZ Design d.o.o. in Logatec, Slovenia.

The system uses a 22 kW compact outrunner brushless DC electric motor located in the nose of the sailplane. Power is provided by two lithium-ion battery packs. Lighter gliders are able to self-launch with FES. Heavier gliders can use it as a sustainer system, i.e. climb and cruise sufficiently high and far to avoid an out-landing. Although gliders with FES have a shorter range (70–100 km) under power than gliders with two-stroke gasoline sustainer engines (10 litres at 8.5 L/h at 100 km/h = 120 km) or jet sustaining engines (150–200 km), the electric motor can be expected to start reliably provided there is sufficient energy in the batteries.

The one-metre diameter propeller is made of carbon fibre and folds across the nose. It opens using centrifugal force when rotation starts. Each propeller blade weighs 260 grams. They are slightly bent to take the shape of the front surface of the fuselage of each type of glider to which they are fitted.

Unlike some electric gliders such as the Lange Antares and Schleicher AS 34Me, the batteries can be removed from the glider for charging off-site. No power supply is needed near the glider itself. The two battery packs each contain 28 Kokam lithium polymer cells. The cells are wired in serial and operate at a voltage range of 90–116V. The two packs contain a total of 4.2 kW⋅h of energy. Each pack weighs 15.7 kg and are mounted in a reinforced area in the fuselage behind the wings. This configuration balances the weight of the motor and propeller. Reinforced carrying cases are used to transport the battery packs to a location where they can be charged.

More than 240 gliders of eleven different types, from seven manufacturers, are already equipped with this system.

- Schempp-Hirth Ventus 3 and its predecessor Schempp-Hirth Ventus 2
- Schempp-Hirth Discus 2
- Schempp-Hirth Duo Discus
- DG Flugzeugbau DG-1000
- Rolladen-Schneider LS8
- LAK-17 and Mini-LAK
- HPH 304
- Diana Sailplanes Diana
- Alisport Silent 2
- Albastar AS
