= Single-blade propeller =

Type of propeller

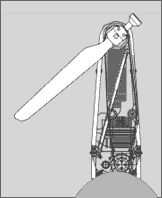
Single-blade propeller drawing

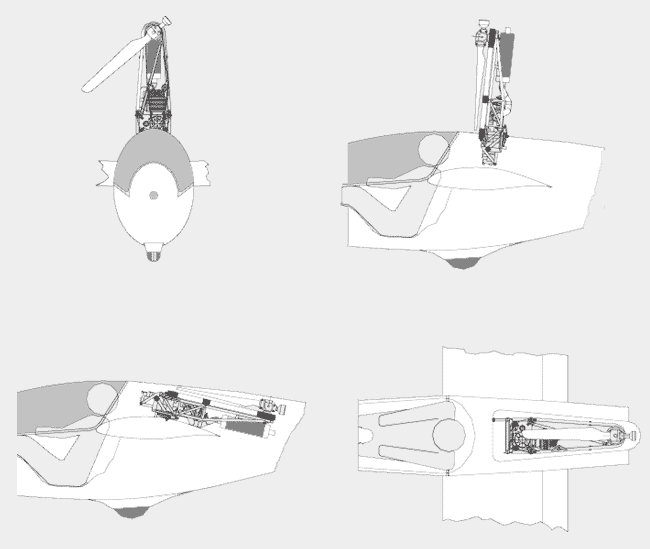
Single-blade propeller and glider drawing

A single-blade propeller may be used on aircraft to generate thrust. Normally propellers are multi-blades but the simplicity of a single-blade propeller fits well on motorized gliders, because it permits the design of a smaller aperture of the glider fuselage for retraction of the power plant. The counterbalanced teetering mono-blade propeller generates fewer vibrations than conventional multi-blade configurations. Often, single blade propeller configurations are touted as having a much greater efficiency than multi-blade propellers, but this is a falsehood outside the inertial losses in spinning a heavier propeller, and the minimal additional drag from added blades. Single bladed propellers are principally used to fulfill engineering requirements that fall outside the scope of efficiency.

== See also ==
- Samara (fruit) single blade-like seed which autorotates in nature.
- Sikorsky XV-2

== Patents ==
- US Patent 2742095 Mechanism for balancing single blade aircraft rotor
- US Patent 6619585 Helicopter single-blade rotor
- US Patent 5971322 - Propeller propulsion unit for aircraft in general

== Sources ==
- https://web.archive.org/web/20070418051732/http://www.glidingmagazine.com/FeatureArticle.asp?id=368
- https://web.archive.org/web/20070202111444/http://www.alisport.com/eu/images/img_news/Volaresett04/VOLARE_SETT04.htm
