= Cremella =

Cremella Crimèla (Lombard)
- Comune
- Comune di Cremella
- Coat of arms

- Location of Cremella in Italy Cremella (Lombardy)
- Coordinates: 45°44′N 9°18′E
- Country: Italy
- Region: Lombardy
- Province: Lecco (LC)

Government
  - Mayor: Ave Pirovano

Area
  - Total: 1.9 km^{2} (0.73 sq mi)

Population (1 January 2014)
  - Total: 1,765
  - Density: 930/km^{2} (2,400/sq mi)
- Demonym: Cremellesi
- Time zone: UTC+1 (CET)
  - Summer (DST): UTC+2 (CEST)
- Postal code: 23894
- Dialing code: 039
- Patron saint: Sts. Sisinius, Martyrius and Alezander
- Website: Official website

Cremella (Brianzöö: Crimèla) is a comune (municipality) in the Province of Lecco in the Italian region Lombardy, located about 30 kilometres (19 mi) northeast of Milan and about 15 kilometres (9 mi) southwest of Lecco.

Cremella borders the following municipalities: Barzago, Barzanò, Bulciago, Cassago Brianza.
