= List of aircraft (Sc) =

This is a list of aircraft in alphabetical order beginning with 'Sc'.

== Sc ==
=== SCA ===
(Société Commercial Aéronautique, France)

- SCA SFR-10

=== SCA ===
(Stabilimento Costruzioni Aeronautiche)

- SCA SS.2
- SCA SS.3

=== SCA ===
(Società Costruzioni Aeronautiche Guidonia)

- SCA A.Q.V
- S.C.A. 2
- S.C.A. 3

=== SCAL ===
(Societe de Constructions et d'Aviation Legere)

- SCAL FB.20 Rubis
- SCAL FB.30 Avion Bassou
- SCAL FB.31
- SCAL FB.41 Rubis

=== Scaled Composites ===
(United States) (for Rutan models up to 79 see Rutan Aircraft Factory)

- Scaled Composites Model 80 Grizzly
- Scaled Composites Model 81 Catbird
- Scaled Composites Model 89
- Scaled Composites Model 91 Lotus Microlight
- Scaled Composites Model 97 Microlight
- Scaled Composites Model 115 Starship
- Scaled Composites Model 115 Starship
- Scaled Composites Model 120 Predator
- Scaled Composites Model 115 Starship
- Scaled Composites Model 133 ATTT
- Scaled Composites Model 143 Triumph
- Scaled Composites Model 144 CM-44
- Scaled Composites Model 151 ARES
- Scaled Composites Model 158 Pond Racer
- Scaled Composites Model 173 Loral TFV
- Scaled Composites Model 179 Lockheed PLADS Rockbox
- Scaled Composites Model 191
- Scaled Composites Model 202 Boomerang
- Scaled Composites Model 205, first preliminary design for airlaunch of a booster rocket heavier than 500,000 pounds (230,000 kg) (1991)
- Scaled Composites Model 206, second preliminary design for heavy airlaunch (1991)
- Scaled Composites Model 226 Raptor
- Scaled Composites Model 233 Freewing
- Scaled Composites Model 247 Vantage
- Scaled Composites Model 271 V-Jet II
- Scaled Composites Model 276 NASA X-38
- Scaled Composites Model 281 Proteus
- Scaled Composites Model 287 NASA ERAST
- Scaled Composites Model 302 Toyota TAA-1
- Scaled Composites Model 309 Adam M-309
- Scaled Composites Model 311 Virgin Atlantic GlobalFlyer
- Tier One
  - Scaled Composites Model 316 SpaceShipOne
  - Scaled Composites Model 318 White Knight
- Tier 1b
  - Scaled Composites Model 339 SpaceShipTwo
  - Scaled Composites Model 348 WhiteKnightTwo
- Scaled Composites Model 351 Stratolaunch
- Scaled Composites Model 326 Northrop Grumman X-47A
- Scaled Composites Model 351
- Scaled Composites Model 367 BiPod
- USAF Hunter-Killer project
  - Scaled Composites Model 395
  - Scaled Composites Model 396
- Scaled Composites B-2 Spirit: Scale model pole-mounted B-2 for radar cross section tests
- Scaled Composites Bell Eagle Eye
- Scaled Composites Space Industries Comet
- Scaled Composites DC-X: Constructed the structural aeroshell and control surfaces under contract to McDonnell Douglas
- Scaled Composites Earthwinds
- Scaled Composites Kistler Zero
- Scaled Composites IAI Searcher: longer-winged version of Pioneer UAV
- Scaled Composites Roton ATV
- Scaled Composites SpaceShipThree
- Scaled Composites Model TRA324 Scarab
- Scaled Composites Orbital Sciences Pegasus rocket
- Scaled Composites Triumph
- SpaceShipOne

=== SCAM ===
(Société des Constructions Aéronautiques du Maine)

- SCAM C.50 Milane II

=== SCAN ===
(Société de Constructions Aéro-Navales de Port-Neuf , France)

- SCAN 20
- SCAN 30
- SCAN 40

=== Schaap-Sestak ===
(Schaap-Sestak Aviation Co. of Chicago / Frank Pontkowsky (designer))

- Schaap-Sestak 1914 scout

=== Schad ===
(Adolph R Schad, 105 Mechanic St, Cleburne TX. 1936: Keene, Texas, United States)

- Schad 1927 Monoplane

=== Schapel ===
( (Rodney E) Schapel Aircraft Co, Reno, Nevada, United States)

- Schapel S-350 Mini-Swat
- Schapel S-525 Super Swat
- Schapel S-882
- Schapel S-981 Swat
- Schapel S-1080 Thunderbolt
- Schapel S-1275 Finesse

=== Schaupp ===
(Paul Schaupp & John Doke, Inglewood, California, United States)

- Schaupp 1951 Monoplane

=== Schauss ===
(Al Schauss, Minneapolis, Minnesota, United States. 1935: Schauss & (Edward C) Lampman.)

- Schauss 1931 Monoplane
- Schauss A
- Schauss-Lampman Sport

=== Scheibe ===
- Scheibe Bergfalke
- Scheibe Spatz
- Scheibe Zugvogel
- Scheibe SF-21
- Scheibe SF-23 Sperling
- Scheibe SF-24 Motor Spatz
- Scheibe SF-25 Falke
- Scheibe SF-26
- Scheibe SF-27
- Scheibe SF-28 Tandem Falke
- Scheibe SF-33
- Scheibe SF-34
- Scheibe SF-36
- Scheibe SF 40

=== Scheller ===
(Bernhard Scheller)

- Scheller S.IV-32b(NASM doc no. AS-204510-01)

=== Schempp-Hirth ===
(Martin Schempp & Wolf Hirth)

- Göppingen Gö 8
- Göppingen Gö 9 development aircraft for Do 335 Pfeil
- Schempp-Hirth GS.6 Milan

=== Scheutzow ===
((Webb) Scheutzow Helicopter Corp, Berea, Ohio, United States)

- Scheutzow Flexhub
- Scheutzow Model B

=== Schiefer ===
(Schiefer & Sons Aeroplane Co, San Diego, California, United States / Schieffer-Robbins)

- Schiefer RS

=== Schiell ===
(Schiell Co. of Brașov)

- Schiell Ra.Bo.

=== Schill ===
(Vermont Air Transport Co, Schill Airport, Milton, Vermont, United States)

- Schill 1914 Biplane
- Schill B-1
- Schill Gull Wing

=== Schleicher ===
- Schleicher ASW 12
- Schleicher ASK 13
- Schleicher ASK 14
- Schleicher ASW 15
- Schleicher ASK 16
- Schleicher ASW 17
- Schleicher ASK 18
- Schleicher ASW 19
- Schleicher ASW XV
- Schleicher ASW 20
- Schleicher ASK 21
- Schleicher ASW 22
- Schleicher ASK 23
- Schleicher ASW 24
- Schleicher ASH 25
- Schleicher ASH 26
- Schleicher ASW 27
- Schleicher ASW 28
- Schleicher ASG 29
- Schleicher Ka 2
- Schleicher Ka 3
- Schleicher Ka 4
- Schleicher Ka 6
- Schleicher K 6E
- Schleicher Ka 7
- Schleicher Ka 8
- Schleicher Ka 9
- Schleicher Ka 10
- Schleicher Ka 11
- Schleicher Luftkurort Poppenhausen
- Schleicher Stadt Frankfurt

=== Schmeidler ===
(Dipl. Ing. Werner Schmeidler)

- Schmeidler SN.2

=== Schmid ===
(Adalbert Schmid)

- Schmid SC-28 Wolke ornithopter
- Schmid 1947 ornithopter
- Schmid Kleinflugzeug Mücke

=== Schmidtler ===
(Ultraleichtflug Schmidtler, Munich, Germany)

- Schmidtler Enduro

=== Schmidt ===
(Bruno Hermann Schmidt/U S Aerial Navigation Co, Homestead, New Jersey, United States)

- Schmidt 1911 Biplane

=== Schmitt ===
(Maximilian Schmitt Aeroplane & Motor Works, 96 Dale Ave, Paterson, New Jersey, United States)

- Schmitt 1914 Monoplane

=== Schmuck Brothers ===
(Edward W & Charles T) Schmuck Bros Aircraft Co, 981 Amalia Ave/Eastside Monarch Aero Corp Airport, Los Angeles, California, United States. 1930: West Coast Aircraft Corp, Los Angeles.)

- Schmuck S-1 Commercial Sport a.k.a. Monarch
- Schmuck S-3 Sport a.k.a. Monarch
- West Coast WCK-2 Sportster a.k.a. Monarch

=== Schneider ===
(Edmund Schneider Germany)

- Schneider ESM 5
- Schneider Motor-Baby

=== Schneider ===
(Edmund Schneider Australia)

- Schneider ES 49
- Schneider ES-52 Kookaburra
- Schneider ES-59
- Schneider ES-65
- Schneider Grunau Baby

=== Schneider ===
(Société des Avions Schneider)

- Schneider Sch-10M
- Schneider Henri-Paul

=== Schneider ===
(Flugmaschine Fabrik Franz Schneider G.m.b.H.)

- Schneider fighter 1918

=== Schoenenberg ===
(Heinrich Schoenenberg)

- Schoenenberg HS 9 Biplane

=== Schoettler ===
(Ferdinand Leopold Schoettler and Ernst Fuetterer – China)

- Schoettler I Dulux Dashatou
- Schoettler III
- Schoettler B3
- Schoettler S4
- Schoettler C4

=== Scholz ===
(Richard Scholz)

- Scholz Alter Adler

=== Scholz ===
(Scholz (aircraft constructor))

- Scholz SS-1

=== Schönleber ===
(Schönleber Metallbau GbR, Schönaich, Germany)

- Schönleber Vento

=== Schramm ===
(Schramm Aircraft Company)

- Schramm Javelin
- Schramm Scorpion

=== Schreder ===
- Schreder Airmate HP-8
- Schreder Airmate HP-9
- Schreder Airmate HP-10
- Schreder Airmate HP-11
- Schreder HP-7
- Schreder HP-12
- Schreder HP-12A
- Schreder HP-13
- Schreder HP-14
- Schreder HP-15
- Schreder HP-16
- Schreder HP-17
- Schreder HP-18
- Schreder HP-19
- Schreder HP-20
- Schreder HP-21
- Schreder HP-22
- Schreder RS-15

=== Schretzmann ===
(Walter Schretzmann)

- Schretzmann S.W.1 Pegasus

=== Schröder Expeditions Gyrocopter ===
(Akelsbarg, Germany)

- Schröder AS-140 Mücke

=== Schroeder ===
(E A Schroeder, 1765 Dolores St, San Francisco, California, United States)

- Schroeder Cyclogyro a.k.a. S-1

=== Schroeder ===
(Richard E Schroeder, Toledo, Ohio, United States)

- Schroeder Air Mate

=== Schroeder-Wentworth ===
(Mercury Aircraft Corp, (Rudolph W "Shorty" Schroeder & John R Wentworth), Hammondsport, New York, United States)

- Schroeder-Wentworth 1929 Monoplane

=== Schubert ===
(E Alvin Schubert, Galesville, Wisconsin, United States)

- Schubert Der Fledermaus

=== Schütte-Lanz ===
(Luftschiffbau Schütte-Lanz)

- Schütte-Lanz C.I
- Schütte-Lanz D.I
- Schütte-Lanz D.II
- Schütte-Lanz D.III
- Schütte-Lanz D.IV
- Schütte-Lanz D.V
- Schütte-Lanz D.VI
- Schütte-Lanz D.VII
- Schütte-Lanz Dr.I
- Schütte-Lanz G.I
- Schütte-Lanz G.II
- Schütte-Lanz G.III
- Schütte-Lanz G.IV
- Schütte-Lanz G.V
- Schütte-Lanz R.I

=== Schwade ===
(Schwade Flugzeug und Motorenbau)

- Kampfeinsitzer Nr1 1914
- Kampfeinsitzer Nr2 1915

=== Schweizer ===
(Schweizer Aircraft Corp, Elmira, New York, United States)

- Schweizer Ag Cat
- Schweizer SGP 1-1
- Schweizer SGU 1-2
- Schweizer SGU 1-3
- Schweizer SGU 1-6
- Schweizer SGU 1-7
- Schweizer SGS 2-8
- Schweizer cargo glider designs
- Schweizer SGC 8-10
- Schweizer SGC 15-11
- Schweizer SGS 2-12
- Schweizer SGC 6-14
- Schweizer SGC 1-15
- Schweizer SGU 1-16
- Schweizer SGS 1-17
- Schweizer SGS 2-18
- Schweizer SGU 1-19
- Schweizer SGU 1-20
- Schweizer SGS 1-21
- Schweizer SGU 2-22
- Schweizer SGS 1-23
- Schweizer SGS 1-24
- Schweizer SGS 2-25
- Schweizer SGS 1-26
- Schweizer 2-27
- Schweizer 7-28
- Schweizer SGS 1-29
- Schweizer SA 1-30
- Schweizer SA 2-31
- Schweizer SGS 2-32
- Schweizer SGS 2-33
- Schweizer SGS 1-34
- Schweizer SGS 1-35
- Schweizer SGS 1-36 Sprite
- Schweizer SGM 2-37
- Schweizer TG-2
- Schweizer TG-3
- Schweizer X-26 Frigate

=== Ścibor-Rylski ===
(Adam Ścibor-Rylski)

- Ścibor-Rylski ŚR-3

=== Scintex Aviation ===
(France)

- Scintex CP-301 C Emeraude
- Scintex CP-315 C Emeraude
- Scintex CP-1310 C3 Super Emeraude
- Scintex CP-1315 C3 Super Emeraude
- Scintex ML.145 Rubis
- Scintex ML.250 Rubis

=== Scott ===
(James F Scott, Chicago, Illinois, United States)

- Scott 1909 aerodyne
- Scott 1910 aerodyne

=== Scott ===
(Ronald Scott, Waukesha, Wisconsin, United States)

- Scott XS-1 Ol' Ironside

=== Scott (aircraft constructor) ===
- Scott SE.5

=== Scott ===
(Allen Scott, Pine Bluff, Arkansas, United States)

- Scott Hoopo

=== Scottish Aeroplane Syndicate ===
(United Kingdom)

- Scottish Aeroplane Syndicate Avis

=== Scottish Aviation ===
(United Kingdom)

- Scottish Aviation Bulldog
- Scottish Aviation Bullfinch
- Scottish Aviation Pioneer
- Scottish Aviation Twin Pioneer

=== Scout ===
(Scout Airplane Co. (Pacific Air Industries), Los Angeles, California, United States)

- Scout Monoplane

=== Scoville ===
(John R Scoville, Rochester, New York, United States)

- Scoville Stardust

=== SC Paragliding ===
(Kharkiv, Ukraine)

- SC Discovery
- SC Scorpion

=== Scroggs ===
(Roy B Scroggs, Eugene, Oregon, United States)

- The Last Laugh

=== SCWL ===
(SCWL SA)

- SCWAL 101
