= Schreder HP-12A =

American homebuilt single-seat glider

HP-12A

General information
- Type: Glider
- National origin: United States
- Designer: Richard Schreder
- Number built: three

History
- Introduction date: 1978
- First flight: 1978

The Schreder HP-12A is an American homebuilt, mid-wing, V tailed, single-seat glider that was assembled out of various components all designed by Richard Schreder.

The aircraft is often confused with a completely different aircraft, the Schreder HP-12.

== Design and development ==
The first HP-12A (HP stands for high performance) was built by a series of amateur sailplane builders, each contributing to the construction. It started off with Art Heabener of New Jersey constructing a rear fuselage from the plans for the original HP-12. The incomplete aircraft was then purchased by Tom Hall of Florida who built a set of HP-14 wings for it and then moved the incomplete aircraft to California and later to Illinois. It was in Illinois that Hall sold the still-incomplete aircraft to Rudy Kunda and Bill Carlson in 1977. They completed the aircraft in 1978.

The finished aircraft retains the HP-12 rear fuselage and HP-14 wings and has added an HP-18 V-tail and the forward fuselage from an HP-10. Kunda indicated that he does not know why the Federal Aviation Administration identifies it as an HP-12A, but it is a 100% Schreder design.

== Operational history ==
In April 2011 the FAA registry listed three HP-12As.

== Specifications (HP-12A) ==
Data from Sailplane Directory and Soaring

General characteristics

- Crew: one
- Wingspan: 54 ft 7 in (16.64 m)
- Wing area: 138.3 sq ft (12.85 m^{2})
- Aspect ratio: 21.6:1
- Airfoil: Wortmann FX 61-163
- Empty weight: 525 lb (238 kg)
- Gross weight: 755 lb (342 kg)

Performance

- Maximum glide ratio: 39:1 at 55 mph (89 km/h)
- Rate of sink: 108 ft/min (0.55 m/s) at 47 mph (76 km/h)
- Wing loading: 5.45 lb/sq ft (26.6 kg/m^{2})

== See also ==
- List of gliders
