= Schreder HP-20 =

American glider

HP-20

General information
- Type: Glider
- National origin: United States
- Designer: Richard Schreder
- Number built: one

History
- Introduction date: 1981
- First flight: 1981

The Schreder HP-20 is an American, high-wing, T-tail, single seat glider designed by Richard Schreder.

== Design and development ==
The HP-20 was designed by Schreder for the FAI 15 Metre Class. The HP-20 prototype was just complete when Schreder lost interest in the project and moved on to work on the HP-21 instead. The sole example of the HP-20 was built by Schreder in his workshop in Byran, Ohio and first flew in 1981.

The HP-20 is all-metal with foam wing ribs. The design shares a similar fuselage to the HP-19, but has a different double-tapered wing of smaller area, 102 sq ft (9.5 m^{2}) versus 113 sq ft (10.5 m^{2}) for the HP-19. This gives the HP-20 a higher wing loading and higher best glide speed, although the glide ratio is the same as the HP-19 at 42:1. The airfoil is a Schreder modification of a Wortmann section, designated as Schreder 3. 200 lb (91 kg) of water ballast can be carried. The landing gear is a retractable monowheel.

== Operational history ==
Even though Richard Schreder died in August 2002, in April 2011 the sole HP-20 was still registered to him.

== Specifications (HP-20) ==
Data from Soaring

General characteristics

- Crew: one
- Wingspan: 49 ft 3 in (15 m)
- Wing area: 102 sq ft (9.5 m^{2})
- Aspect ratio: 24.5
- Airfoil: Schreder 3, a modification of a Wortmann section
- Empty weight: 470 lb (213 kg)
- Gross weight: 970 lb (440 kg) includes 200 lbs (91 kg) or water ballast

Performance

- Maximum glide ratio: 42:1 at 60 mph (98 km/h)
- Rate of sink: 120 ft/min (0.61 m/s) at 50 mph (80 km/h)
- Wing loading: 9.5 lb/sq ft (46 kg/m^{2})

== See also ==
- List of gliders
