= Zauner =

Zauner is a surname. Notable people with the surname include:

- Cliff Zauner, American politician
- David Zauner (born 1985), Austrian ski jumper
- Gary Zauner (born 1950), American football coach
- Franz Anton von Zauner, Austrian sculptor
- Franz Zauner (pilot) (1916-2008), Austrian pilot
- Michelle Zauner (born 1989), Korean-American musician and author
- Peter Zauner (born 1983), Austrian badminton player

== See also ==
- Zauner OZ-4 a modified version of Schreder HP-14, a Richard Schreder-designed all-metal glider aircraft that was offered as a kit for homebuilding during the 1960s and 1970s
- Zauner OZ-5 One-Yankee, an American high-wing, T-tailed, single seat, 15 metre class glider that was designed and constructed by Otto Zauner
