= HP7 =

hp7 or variant, may refer to:

- HP7, the postcode for Amersham, see HP postcode area
- hP7, a Pearson symbol
- Harry Potter and the Deathly Hallows, the seventh Harry Potter novel
- Harry Potter and the Deathly Hallows – Part 1, the seventh Harry Potter film
- Harry Potter and the Deathly Hallows – Part 2, the second part of the seventh Harry Potter film
- Schreder HP-7, a glider
- Handley Page Type G a.k.a. H.P.7, an airplane
- Historic name for AA battery in the United Kingdom

== See also ==
- HP (disambiguation)
