= HP9 =

HP9 or variant, may refer to:

- HP9, a postcode for Beaconsfield, see HP postcode area
- Norinco HP9-1, a shotgun
- Schreder Airmate HP-9, a glider
- HP 9g, a Hewlett Packard graphing calculator

== See also ==
- HP (disambiguation)
