= HP8 =

HP8 may refer to:

- HP8, the postcode for Chalfont St Giles
- Schreder Airmate HP-8, an American, high-wing single seat glider
- Harry Potter and the Deathly Hallows - Part 2, the eighth installment in the Harry Potter film series
- Harry Potter and the Cursed Child, a stage play which follows the seventh novel of the series

== See also ==
- HP (disambiguation)
