= Scovel =

Scovel is a surname. Notable people with the surname include:

- Florence Scovel Shinn (1871–1940), American artist and book illustrator
- Rory Scovel (born 1980), American comedian, writer, and actor
- Sylvester H. Scovel (1869–1905), American journalist

== See also ==
- Scovell
