= Lit bro =

Male archetype

A lit bro is a pejorative term for a male reader deemed to be characterized by snobbery, misogyny, pretentiousness, and other pompous qualities. Likewise, bro lit refers to the catalog of books which such readers are supposed to consume. The term has particularly been mentioned in discourse about Infinite Jest by David Foster Wallace, a book which some women have reported being recommended by lit bros, allegedly for performative reasons.

== Definition ==
=== Lit bro ===
In 2026, John Semley, writing for Wired, defined the lit bro as "a sullen male chauvinist drawn to challenging literature by male authors who proudly project an air of literary snobbery."

Semley observed that the history of "literary machismo" was a long one, dating back to Herman Melville in the nineteenth century and Ernest Hemingway and the Beatniks in the twentieth, and named challenging prose style—William Gaddis and Thomas Pynchon—and challenging content—American Psycho and Blood Meridian—as hallmarks of the "litbro catalog."

=== Bro lit ===
Musician and writer Michelle Zauner, in writing a new foreword for Infinite Jest, defined lit-bro literature as generally having "A white, male protagonist, isolated and misunderstood, stands at odds with social norms and expectations and either grapples internally to critique them or identifies the source of ideology and seeks violent revenge against it."

CT Jones, writing in Rolling Stone, defined bro lit as books which contain generally unlikeable male protagonists with lack of self-awareness, as well as "books favored by pretentious artsy college boys."

== History ==
In the 2010s, writer Dana Schwartz created the satirical Twitter account @GuyInYourMFA to represent "the archetypal pretentious literary bro" she purportedly encountered at Brown University: "They leaned, leggy and supine along the stairs and railings of the neo-Brutalist campus library, flicking cigarette ash and staring into the distance with dark eyes over hollow, gorgeous cheekbones."

On February 22, 2025, Federico Perelmuter, writing in the Los Angeles Review of Books, used the term "brodernism" to refer to works defined with words such as avant-garde, maximalist, difficult, epic, and many others, typically written by male writers. The piece went viral and spurred discourse about the alleged difficulty about translated literature written by men.

On June 23, 2025, Joseph Bernstein lamented in The New York Times that the "literary man" was disappearing from society, pointing out that the publishing industry and contemporary fiction no longer topically appealed to the concerns of masculinity. Will Fletcher, writing for the Washington Examiner, argued Bernstein misdiagnosed the issue, instead suggesting that "Any man who does read today is labeled a dangerous, right-wing 'lit bro'" and that "Serious literature is seen as unacceptable and problematic."

In 2026, following the republication of Infinite Jest, Semley drew a connection between the lit bro and the performative male, which he identified as its "latest mutation" which "doesn't even read big books" but rather "just peacocks with them for attention."

=== Infinite Jest ===
Wallace and Infinite Jest are frequently cited in discourse regarding lit bros. In 2015, The Cut ran a piece on "Why Literary Chauvinists Love David Foster Wallace," and Electric Literature published digital producer Deirdre Coyle's essay on "Wallace-recommending men." In announcing Infinite Jest's thirty-year republication, Literary Hub stated that "the book has become shorthand for a certain kind of pretentious, performative, male-coded lit bro." Wallace himself, in 1993, had stated that his readership was "Yuppies, I guess, and younger intellectuals, whatever."

Discourse about lit bros resumed with the thirty-year republication of Infinite Jest in February 2026. In its foreword, Philadelphia indie pop musician Zauner remarked, "I'm not what you might consider Infinite Jest's target demographic" and described its audience as "a breed of college-aged men who talk over you, a sect of pedantic, misunderstood young men for whom, over the course of thirty years, Infinite Jest has become a rite of passage."

Accountant Abraham Beame, reflecting on the thirty-year anniversary in wake of Zauner's observations, stated that "David Foster Wallace's thick-as-a-brick 1996 magnum opus is a lit-bro punchline, an online-dating red flag, and a forbidding 1,000-plus-page endurance test" as well as "an indicator that the guy you’re hooking up with (if he's got the book positioned conspicuously on his shelf) might be a douchebag."
