= Schreder HP-17 =

American glider

HP-17
- The HP-17

General information
- Type: Glider
- National origin: United States
- Designer: Richard Schreder
- Status: Sole example no longer on the US registry
- Primary user: Richard Schreder
- Number built: one

The Schreder HP-17 was an American mid-wing, V tailed, single seat, experimental glider designed by Richard Schreder to test a new airfoil section.

== Design and development ==
The HP-17 was designed to test a new airfoil section, the Wortmann FX 72 MS-150A. This airfoil is a high-lift, low drag section that Scheder thought would be a good sailplane design.

The HP-17 is all-metal in construction, except for its foam wing ribs. The wing features water ballast carried inside the wing spar. The wing also has full-span flaps and spoilerons in place of ailerons.

== Operational history ==
The HP-17 was given its baptism of fire in the 1973 US Nationals when Schreder flew it in the FAI 15 Metre Class. The aircraft placed 38th and thus was not deemed a success. After the competition it was not used again and Schreder tuned his attention to the much more successful HP-18 instead.

The HP-17 was retained by Schreder for many years, and was bought privately in 2020 and since has been hangared and flown out of Toronto Soaring Club in Canada.

== Specifications (HP-17) ==
Data from Soaring

General characteristics

- Crew: one
- Wingspan: 49 ft 3 in (15 m)
- Wing area: 113 sq ft (10.5 m^{2})
- Aspect ratio: 21.4
- Airfoil: Wortmann FX 72 MS-150A
- Empty weight: 500 lb (227 kg) including 200 lbs (90 kg) of water ballast
- Gross weight: 940 lb (426 kg)

Performance

- Maximum glide ratio: 40:1
- Rate of sink: 102 ft/min (0.52 m/s) at 40 mph (64 km/h)
- Wing loading: 8.3 lb/sq ft (41 kg/m^{2}) with full water ballast

== See also ==
- List of gliders
