= Schreder HP-22 =

American glider

HP-22

General information
- Type: Amphibious flying boat motor glider
- National origin: United States
- Designer: Richard Schreder
- Number built: none

History
- First flight: none

The Schreder HP-22 was an American mid-wing, amphibious flying boat, cruciform tailed, two seat motor glider project that was designed by Richard Schreder. None were ever completed or flown.

== Design and development ==
The HP-22 project was publicly announced in June 1984 in Soaring and, in comparison to Schreder's previous glider designs, was intended for "much easier building and for more versatile fun-flying when it's finished".

The aircraft was intended to accommodate two people in side-by-side seating under a bubble canopy. The engine was to be mounted above and behind the cockpit and to retract rearward to lie in a bay when not in use. The mid-mounted wing was to have a span of 49.2 ft (15.0 m) and a constant chord, built with an aluminium spar, foam ribs and covered with aluminium skins. The tail would be similarly constructed. The wings also included coupled ailerons and flaps.

The intention was that the flying boat hull would be constructed from four panels of PVC foam covered on both sides with fiberglass at the factory, with the builder just epoxying them together around pre-formed bulkheads. The landing gear was to consist of a retractable tricycle gear, with the main gear swiveling aft and nose wheel retracting forward to act as a docking bumper on the nose. The landing gear main wheel design included disc brakes. The planing hull featured a normal step cut out and Schreder indicated that if this was shown to create too much drag during flight testing that he would design a retractable fairing for it. His intention was to have retractable tip floats that would swing outboard to form wing tips in flight in the same manner as on the Consolidated PBY Catalina, which Schreder had flown during the Second World War.

Despite its flying boat design, the HP-22 was intended as a soaring motor glider and the designer estimated its glide ratio at 30:1 and its minimum sink speed at 2.0 feet per second.

Schreder started work on the HP-22 before the HP-21 was finished and did not finish, register or fly either aircraft.

== Specifications (HP-22 projected) ==
Data from Soaring

General characteristics

- Crew: one
- Capacity: one
- Wingspan: 49 ft 3 in (15 m)
- Empty weight: 500 lb (227 kg)
- Gross weight: 1,100 lb (499 kg)
- Powerplant: 1 × retractable two stroke engine
- Propellers: 2-bladed wooden

Performance

- Maximum glide ratio: 30:1
- Rate of sink: 120 ft/min (0.61 m/s)

== See also ==
- List of gliders
