= Preiss RHJ-9 =

RHJ-9

General information
- Type: Two-seat sailplane
- National origin: Canada
- Manufacturer: Homebuilt
- Designer: Henry Preiss

History
- First flight: 1978
- Developed from: Preiss RHJ-8

The Preiss RHJ-9 is an evolution of the RHJ-7 and RHJ-8 side-by-side two-seat flapped homebuilt gliders. The wingspan was increased to 18.29 m and the maximum mass was raised to 500 kg. A wing construction similar to that of the later HP-18 was adopted employing foam ribs bonded to the aluminum spars and skins. It first flew in 1978.

== Specifications ==
General characteristics

- Crew: 1 pilot
- Capacity: 1 passenger
- Wingspan: 60 ft 0 in (18.29 m)
- Wing area: 155 sq ft (14.4 m^{2})
- Aspect ratio: 23.25
- Empty weight: 670 lb (304 kg)
- Gross weight: 1,102 lb (500 kg)

Performance

- Rate of sink: 138 ft/min (0.70 m/s)
