= Henry Preiss =

Henry Preiss is a sailplane designer. He was a longtime friend and neighbor of Richard Schreder and they worked together to develop and build several examples each of the RHJ-7 and RHJ-8 two-seat sailplanes, and also the RHJ-9 and RHJ-10. Preiss also finished the Schreder HP-19.

The RHJ sailplanes were developed on-the-fly; neither Preiss nor Schreder kept detailed plans or design drawings, and made only what sketches were necessary for the basic engineering validation of the structure.
