= Schreder RS-15 =

American glider

RS-15

General information
- Type: Club (formerly 15 metre) class Sailplane
- Manufacturer: Homebuilt
- Designer: Richard Schreder

The RS-15 is a Richard Schreder-designed metal Racing Class sailplane that was offered as a kit for homebuilding during the 1970s and 1980s.

Unlike Schreder's other designs, which are all designated HP (for High Performance), the RS-15 takes its nomenclature from the designer's initials and its wingspan in metres.

== Design and development ==
The dominating aesthetic feature of the RS-15 is its pod-and-boom fuselage. The forward fuselage is a composite molding, and the aft portion is a 6" diameter aluminum tube. The V-tail is essentially the same as on other contemporary Schreder sailplanes, differing only in detail design from that of the HP-18.

Unlike Schreder's HP-series gliders, the RS-15 was intended to achieve more modest performance, sacrificing performance for a shortened build time.

Early RS-15 models featured wings that were essentially the same as the HP-16, and using the same one-piece machined aluminum I-beam wing spar. Later units were supplied with wing kits nearly identical to those of the HP-18, using that ship's riveted aluminum box spar. Unlike the HP-18, however, RS-15 examples usually lack the flap/aileron interconnect that adjusts the neutral aileron deflection to match that of the flap in the range of -10 to +10 flap deflection. Some of these sailplanes with the updated HP-18 wings have -10 to +90 degrees flap deflection.

Major features:

- Pod-and-boom fuselage with relatively deep cockpit
- V-tail that folds upwards for easy storage
- Wing structure composed of spars with caps pre-machined from solid aluminium plate and aluminium wing skins bonded to closely spaced foam ribs
- Fiberglass fuselage pod, wing tip skids and tail fairings
- Tubular aluminum aft fuselage
- Winglets added by some homebuilders
- Water ballast carried inside the hollow aluminium wing spars
- Typical Schreder trailing edge flaps/airbrakes

== Specifications ==

General characteristics

- Crew: One pilot
- Length: 22 ft 0 in (6.71 m)
- Wingspan: 49 ft 2 in (15.00 m)
- Wing area: 113 sq ft (10.5 m^{2})
- Aspect ratio: 21.4
- Empty weight: 440 lb (200 kg)
- Gross weight: 940 lb (426 kg)

Performance

- Maximum speed: 150 mph (240 km/h, 130 kn)
- Maximum glide ratio: 38
- Rate of sink: 126 ft/min (0.60 m/s)

== See also ==
Related lists

- List of gliders
