= Schreder HP-19 =

American glider

HP-19

General information
- Type: Glider
- National origin: United States
- Designer: Richard Schreder
- Number built: one

History
- Introduction date: 1981
- First flight: 1981

The Schreder HP-19 is an American, high-wing, T-tail, single seat glider designed by Richard Schreder.

== Design and development ==
The HP-19 was another Schreder design for the FAI 15 Metre Class. The HP-19 drawings were just complete when the designer lost interest in development and turned his attention to the HP-21 instead. The sole example of the HP-19 was built by Henry Preiss in Schreder's workshop in Bryan, Ohio and first flew in 1981.

The HP-19 is built from metal and fiberglass and features carbon fiber spar caps, along with foam ribs. The wing is straight, tapered and has winglets, along with the trademark Schreder 90° flaps. The airfoil is a Schreder modification of a Wortmann section. 200 lb (91 kg) of water ballast can be carried. The landing gear is a retractable monowheel.

== Variants ==
HP-19C
The sole example of the HP-19 is registered as an HP-19C.

== Specifications (HP-19) ==
Data from Sailplane Directory and Soaring

General characteristics

- Crew: one
- Wingspan: 49 ft 3 in (15 m)
- Wing area: 113 sq ft (10.5 m^{2})
- Aspect ratio: 21.4
- Airfoil: Schreder modification of a Wortmann section
- Empty weight: 470 lb (213 kg)
- Gross weight: 970 lb (440 kg) includes 200 lbs (91 kg) or water ballast

Performance

- Maximum glide ratio: 42:1 at 50 mph (80 km/h)
- Rate of sink: 96 ft/min (0.49 m/s) at 40 mph (64 km/h)
- Wing loading: 8.58 lb/sq ft (41.9 kg/m^{2})

== See also ==
- List of gliders
