= Schreder HP-13 =

US single-seat glider

HP-13

General information
- Type: Glider
- National origin: United States
- Designer: Richard Schreder
- Number built: 8

History
- Developed from: Schreder HP-11
- Variant: Schreder HP-14

The Schreder HP-13 is an American high-wing, single seat FAI Open Class glider that was designed by Richard Schreder.

== Design and development ==
The HP-13 (HP stands for high performance) was a developmental milestone aircraft between the HP-11 and the later HP-14. The HP-13 was designed by taking the fuselage of the HP-11 and wings similar to the HP-12, featuring the same Wortmann FX 61-163 airfoil but extended from the HP-12's 49.2 ft (15 m) FAI Standard Class span to 54 ft 7 in (16.64 m) for the open class. Eight HP-13s were completed.

The HP-13 was later developed into the HP-14 by designing a new fuselage for the wings. The HP-14 was later type certified in the United Kingdom, while the HP-13s were all amateur-built.

== Operational history ==
In April 2011 there were still five HP-13s registered with the Federal Aviation Administration, all in the Experimental - Amateur-built category.

== Specifications (HP-13) ==
Data from Sailplane Directory and Soaring

General characteristics

- Crew: one
- Wingspan: 54 ft 7 in (16.64 m)
- Airfoil: Wortmann FX 61-163

Performance

== See also ==
- List of gliders
