= SCAL FB.40 =

1930s French trainer aircraft

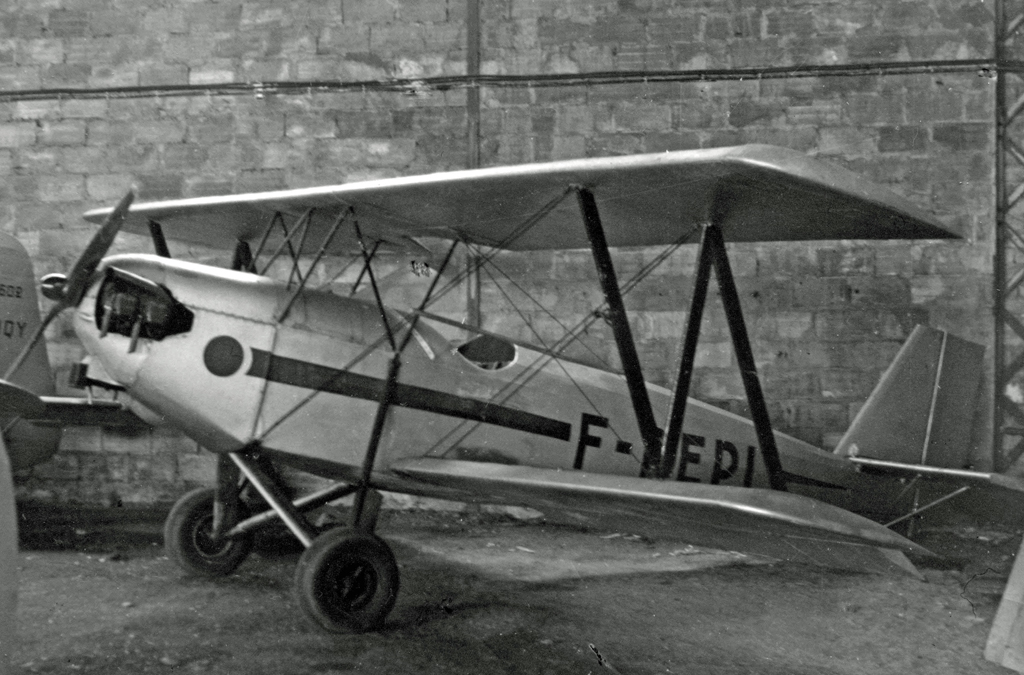
- SCAL FB.41 no.01 in 1957 re-engined with a 65 hp (48 kW) Continental A-65 flat four engine.

General information
- Type: Two seat tourer
- National origin: France
- Manufacturer: SCAL
- Designer: Antoine Bassou

History
- First flight: autumn 1938

The SCAL FB.40 was a French, side-by-side seat biplane trainer chosen in 1938 for widespread use in the Aviation Populaire programme. The Second World War prevented large scale production but at least two were restored post-war, one becoming a familiar rally participant.

== Design and development ==
After completing the nationalization of the French military aviation industry in April 1937, government attention turned to the civil sector with the establishment of the Aviation Populaire programme aimed at popularizing flying. This was proposed by the Ministre de l’Air (Air Minister) in June 1936 and officially established in July. By the end of 1937 a selection of seventeen suitable aircraft in different stages of development, including the FB.40, had been made.

The FB.40 was a wooden, equal span biplane, with rectangular plan wings mounted with marked stagger. The lower wings were mounted on the lower fuselage longerons and the upper wing was held centrally over the fuselage on cabane struts, with N-form interplane struts completing the structure. Full span ailerons were fitted only to the lower wings.

The FB.40 was powered by a 62 hp (46 kW), air-cooled, four cylinder inline Régnier 4D.0. Student and instructor sat side-by-side under a cut-out in the trailing edge of the upper wing which improved their upward field of view. The tail was angular with a cropped triangular fin carrying a near rectangular rudder. Its tailplane was mounted on top of the fuselage and braced to it from below. The elevators were also rectangular in plan apart from a cut-out for rudder movement.

The FB.40 had a fixed, conventional undercarriage with its wheels on longitudinal, outward-leaning, faired V-struts hinged on the fuselage centreline. Long, thin shock absorbers were mounted on the upper fuselage longerons.

== Operational history ==
The exact date of the first flight of the FB.40 is not known but by 30 October 1938 its initial tests at Orly, where it was flown by Henry Thibault, had proved it ready to go to C.E.M.A. at Villacoublay for certification. By 20 May 1939 the 70 hp (52 kW) Minié 4 D0 Horus flat four-powered FB.41 variant had logged 10 hours flight, demonstrating good flight characteristics as well as a top speed of 160 km/h (99 mph; 86 kn). Though both types were offered for sale there was to be little time to build many production aircraft before the outbreak of World War II in September. No details from this period are known; however, at least two airframes survived the war.

An FB.40 was offered for sale in 1948 which may have been the aircraft that in 1949, fitted instead with a 62 hp (46 kW) Continental A65-8 flat four engine, began competing in rallies. Designated a FB.41, it was owned by the Aero Club de Versailles between 1957 and 1962 and based at Saint-Cyr-l'École but by 1964 was no longer on the French civil register.

By about 1954 the second survivor had been modified, though apart from a photo little is known about it.

== Variants ==
FB.40
original version with 62 hp (46 kW) Régnier 4 inline engine.
FB.41
powered by a 70 hp (52 kW) Minié 4 D0 Horus flat four.

== Specifications (FB.40) ==
Data from L'Aérophile, February 1938, Performance figures are estimates.

General characteristics

- Crew: one
- Capacity: one passenger
- Length: 5.62 m (18 ft 5 in)
- Wingspan: 7.50 m (24 ft 7 in)
- Wing area: 16.25 m^{2} (174.9 sq ft)
- Empty weight: 270 kg (595 lb)
- Gross weight: 490 kg (1,080 lb)
- Powerplant: 1 × Régnier 4D.0 four cylinder inline, 46 kW (62 hp)

Performance

- Maximum speed: 140 km/h (87 mph, 76 kn)
- Range: 450 km (280 mi, 240 nmi)
- Service ceiling: 6,000 m (20,000 ft)
