= Scintex Aviation =

Scintex Aviation S.A. was a French aircraft manufacturer which was active between 1956 and 1964.

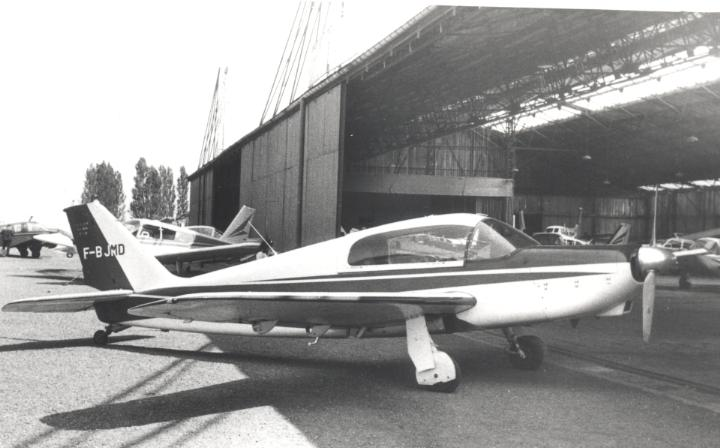
Scintex Rubis at Toussus-le-Noble airfield near Paris in 1967

== Formation ==
Scintex was formed in 1956 by Jean-Michel Vernhes and a production line was established to build the Piel CP.301 Emeraude, designed by Claude Piel, initially as the CP.30, under licence for French club and private owners.

== Aircraft production ==
The Scintex version of the Emeraude was the standard design with upward-opening cabin doors. From 1960 the CP.301C version was introduced, and this incorporated a single-piece clearview sliding canopy.

Claude Piel, who had worked for SCANOR (Societe de Constructions Aeronautiques du Nord), which built Emeraudes, joined Scintex in 1959 and the company introduced the CP.1310 Super Emeraude which first flew on 20 April 1962 and incorporated a strengthened airframe for elementary aerobatics and a generally cleaned-up layout. The majority of the Scintex Emeraudes and Super Emeraudes were built at the Menavia factory at Clermont-Ferrand, but the CP.320 version was intended for construction by amateurs.

== Scintex own aircraft designs ==
In the early 1960s, Scintex wished to broaden its line of aircraft and flew the ML 145 Rubis four-seat touring aircraft on 24 May 1961. This was developed into the Scintex ML 250 Rubis which first flew on 3 June 1962. The improved Rubis had a more powerful engine and was equipped with five seats. Competition from established all-metal aircraft such as the Beech 35 Bonanza resulted in only eight Rubis being completed.

== Cessation of aircraft production ==
With the lack of sales success with the Rubis, Scintex abandoned aircraft production in late 1964. At the same time, the firm subcontracted construction of all Super Emeraudes to CAARP at Beynes-Thiverval airfield near Paris and in due course CAARP built the aircraft in its own right.
