= Scovell =

Scovell may refer to:

- Claire Scovell LaZebnik, an American author
- Edith Joy Scovell (1907–1999), a British poet
- Eduardo Lefebvre Scovell (1864–1918), a British artist
- Florence Scovel Shinn (1871–1940), an artist-turned spiritual teacher
- George Scovell (1774–1861), British army officer and code-breaker
- Melville Amasa Scovell (1855–1912), American academic
- Nell Scovell, a television writer/creator
- William Scovell Savory (1826–1895), a British surgeon

== See also ==
- Scoville (disambiguation)
