= Schreder Airmate HP-10 =

American glider

HP-10
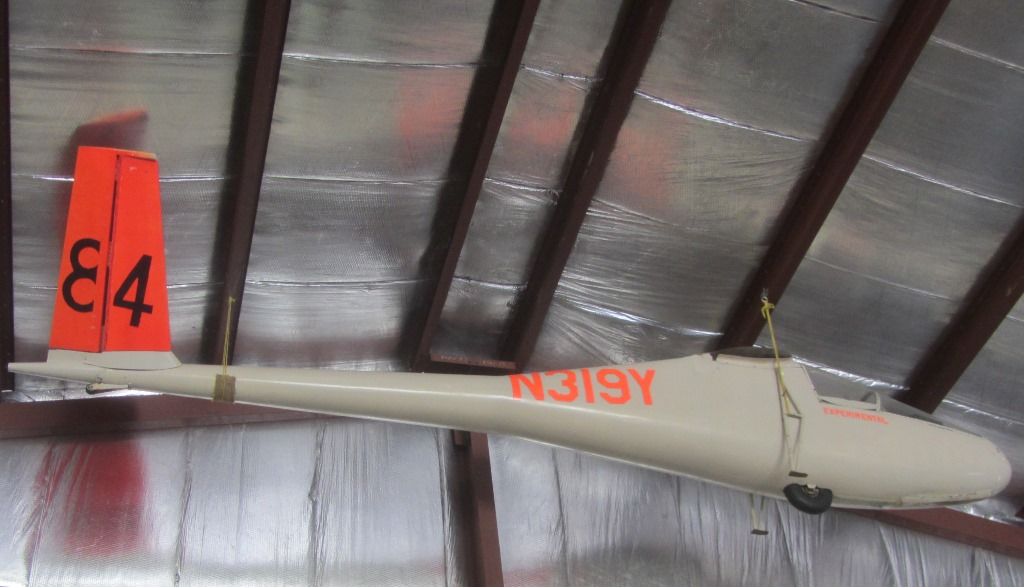
- HP-10 fuselage on display

General information
- Type: Glider
- National origin: United States
- Designer: Richard Schreder
- Status: Out of production
- Number built: 9

History
- Introduction date: 1961
- First flight: 1961

The Schreder Airmate HP-10 is an American, high wing, single seat, FAI Standard Class glider that was designed by Richard Schreder. Airmate was the name of Schreder's design company.

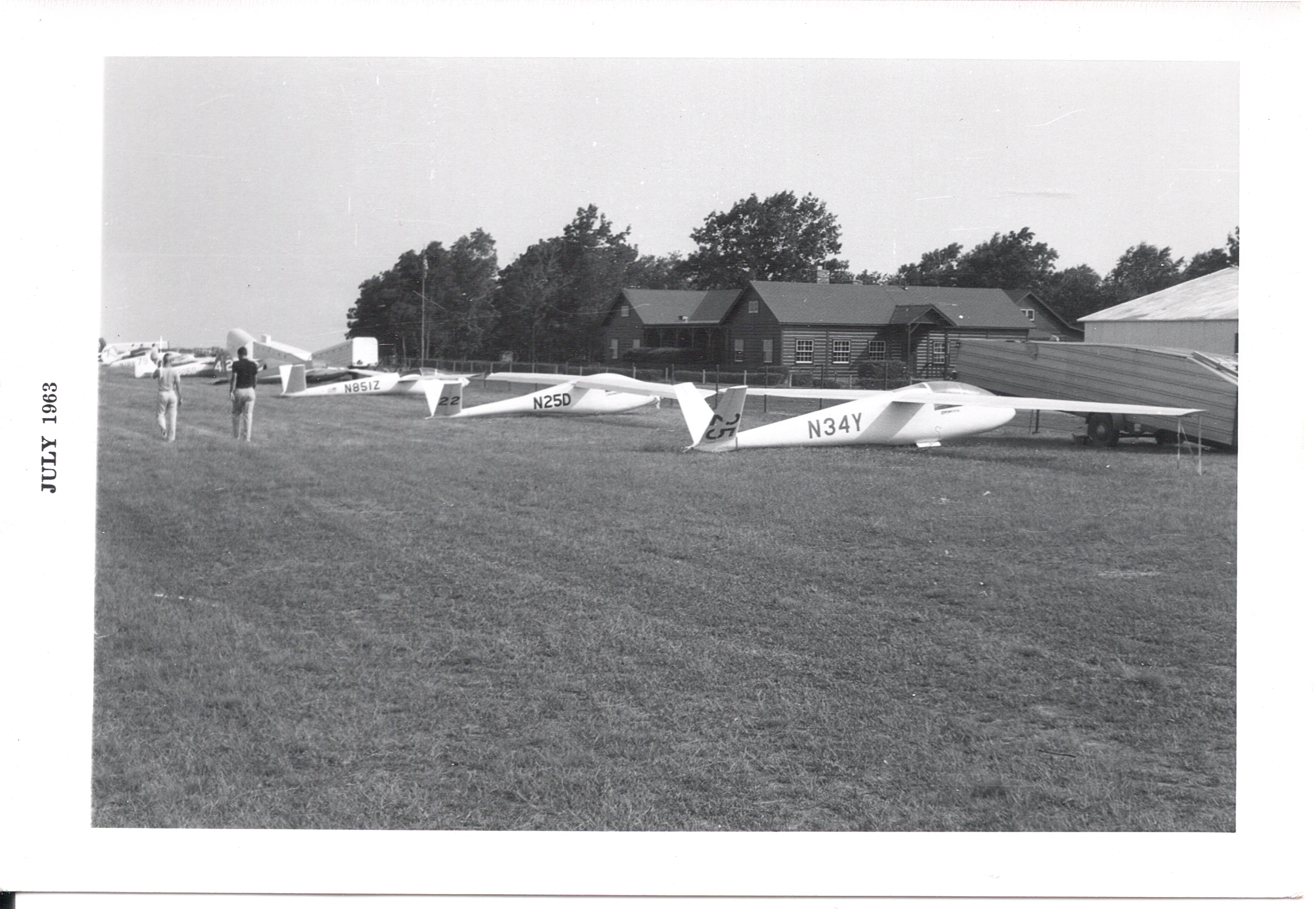
The HP-10 in the centre of this line-up of Schreder gliders at the 1963 US Soaring Championships at Harris Hill, Elmira, NY.

== Design and development ==
The HP-10 (HP stands for high performance) was designed by Schreder for the 1961 US Nationals.

The aircraft is built from aluminium and has a V-tail. The constant-chord wing is made up from eight aluminum honeycomb-sandwich structural panels and has large flaps, using up 34 ft (10.4 m), or 70%, of the 48 ft (14.6 m) wingspan. The wing uses a NACA 65 (3)-618 airfoil, the same profile as the HP-8. Some HP-10s were finished with Helisoar-produced fiberglass Hoerner wingtips. The landing gear is a fixed monowheel.

The production rights to the HP-10 were purchased by Helisoar, a company owned by Steve duPont. The company produced a number of kits for the aircraft before production was ended. At least nine kits were completed, most in the Experimental - amateur-built category. Some were registered with the Federal Aviation Administration as Helisoar HP-10s. When Helisoar was liquidated duPont donated all the tooling, parts, drawings and engineering reports to the EAA AirVenture Museum as the Soaring Society of America had no storage space at that time.

== Operational history ==
Schreder and the HP-10 won the Stroukoff Trophy in 1961 for a 57 km/h (35.5 mph) 229 km (142 miles) goal and return flight.

With its high wing loading of 6.75 lb/sq ft (33.0 kg/m^{2}) and small wing area of 114 sq ft (10.6 m2), the HP-10 developed a reputation of being difficult to keep aloft in weak soaring conditions.

In April 2011 there were three HP-10s registered with the FAA, including one in the National Soaring Museum and one in the EAA AirVenture Museum.

== Aircraft on display ==
- EAA AirVenture Museum - 1
- National Soaring Museum - 1, listed as in storage

== Specifications (HP-10) ==
Data from Sailplane Directory, Soaring and EAA

General characteristics

- Crew: one
- Length: 21 ft 11 in (6.68 m)
- Wingspan: 48 ft 0 in (14.63 m)
- Wing area: 114 sq ft (10.6 m^{2})
- Aspect ratio: 20.2
- Airfoil: NACA 65 (3)-618
- Empty weight: 535 lb (243 kg)
- Gross weight: 780 lb (354 kg)

Performance

- Stall speed: 38 mph (61 km/h, 33 kn)
- Never exceed speed: 150 mph (240 km/h, 130 kn)
- Maximum glide ratio: 35:1 at 60 mph (97 km/h)
- Rate of sink: 132 ft/min (0.67 m/s) at 43 mph (69 km/h) estimated
- Wing loading: 6.75 lb/sq ft (33.0 kg/m^{2})

== See also ==
- List of gliders
