= Schütte-Lanz D.IV =

D.IV
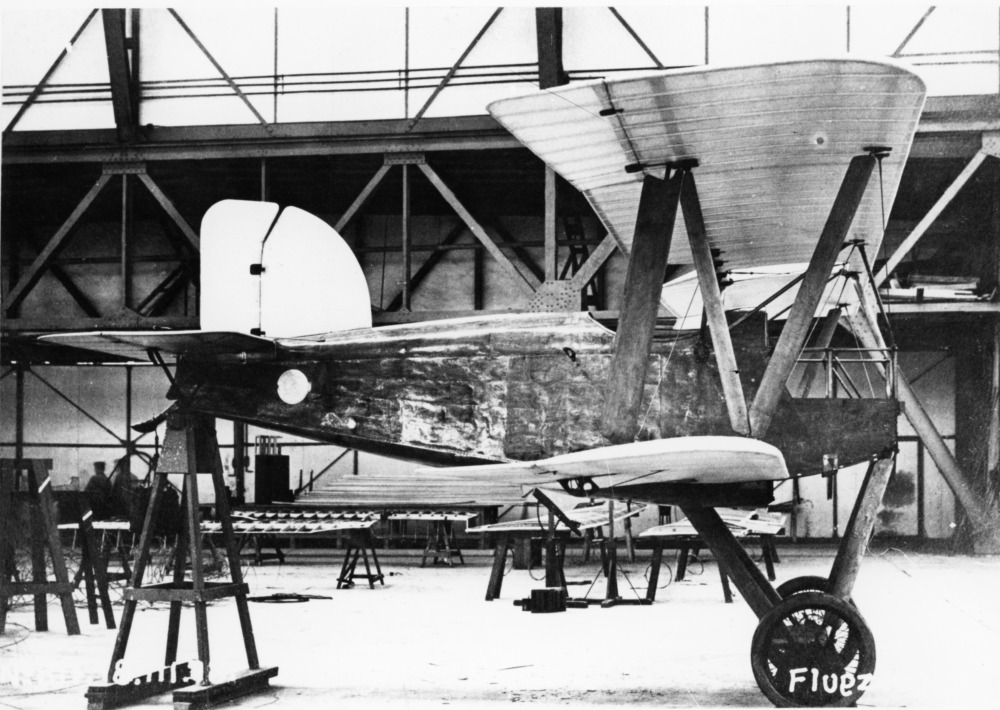

General information
- Type: Fighter
- Manufacturer: Schütte-Lanz
- Designer: Walter Stein
- Number built: 2

History
- First flight: 1917

The Schütte-Lanz D.IV was a German fighter prototype during World War I. It was developed in parallel with the Schütte-Lanz D.III, however the two fighters had nothing in common. The D.IV was made of wood and was a single-bay staggered biplane with N-type interplane struts and ailerons on both upper and lower mainplanes. It first flew in late 1917 and was found to be inferior to the Schütte-Lanz D.III, and as a result production was not started.

A second prototype, designated D.IVa, was built with minor improvements including a frontal radiator and revised undercarriage. A proposed derivative of the D.IV with a Mercedes D.III fitted with a Brown Boveri compressor, designated D.V, was axed in May 1918 and remained a paper project only.

== Specifications ==
Data from The Complete Book of Fighters

General characteristics

- Crew: 1
- Length: 5.8 m (19 ft 0 in)
- Wingspan: 9 m (29 ft 6 in)
- Empty weight: 695 kg (1,532 lb)
- Gross weight: 886 kg (1,953 lb)
- Powerplant: 1 × Benz Bz.IIIbo V-8 water-cooled piston engine, 160 kW (220 hp)
- Propellers: 2-bladed fixed pitch wooden propeller

Performance

- Time to altitude: 5,000 m (16,000 ft) in 14 minutes

Armament

- Guns: 2 x 7.9 mm (0.311 in) LMG 08/15 machine guns

== Bibliography ==
- Green, William; Gordon Swanborough (1997). The Complete Book of Fighters. London: Salamander Books Limited. p. 520. ISBN 1-85833-777-1.
