= Schreder Airmate HP-9 =

American glider

HP-9

General information
- Type: Glider
- National origin: United States
- Designer: Richard Schreder
- Number built: One

The Schreder Airmate HP-9 is an American high wing, single seat glider that was designed by Richard Schreder and intended to be flown by the designer in the 1960 World Gliding Championships.

Airmate was the name of Schreder's design company.

== Design and development ==
The HP-9, the HP indicating high performance, was Schreder's FAI Standard Class follow-on design to the FAI Open Class HP-8 and was built to compete in the 1960 Worlds in the newly established Standard Class, but was not completed in time. The HP-9 was sold unfinished to Bob Litle, Jr who had Javelin Aircraft complete the glider.

The HP-9 is constructed entirely of aluminium and has an all-flying stabilator tail. The aircraft also features dive brakes and a retractable monowheel undercarriage. The wing has Fowler flaps which increase the wing area from 127.4 to 143.7 sq ft (12 to 13 m^{2}) and lower the minimum sink speed to 2.11 feet per second (0.64 m/s) at 47 mph (76 km/h) from 2.26 ft/s (0.69 m/s) at 60 mph (97 km/h).

Only one HP-9 was built.

== Operational history ==
The sole HP-9 was still in existence in April 2011 and was listed by the Federal Aviation Administration as having been sold to the Centre County, Pennsylvania Visitor Bureau.

== Specifications (HP-9) ==
Data from Sailplane Directory and Soaring

General characteristics

- Crew: one
- Wingspan: 48 ft 10 in (14.88 m)
- Wing area: 127.4 sq ft (11.84 m^{2}) wing area 143.7 with flaps extended
- Aspect ratio: 18.6:1
- Airfoil: Wortmann FX-191
- Empty weight: 650 lb (295 kg)
- Gross weight: 845 lb (383 kg)

Performance

- Maximum glide ratio: 36:1 at 62.5 mph (100 km/h)
- Rate of sink: 136 ft/min (0.69 m/s) at 60 mph (97 km/h), 127 ft/min (0.64 m/s) at 47 mph (76 km/h) with flaps extended
- Wing loading: 5.54 lb/sq ft (27.0 kg/m^{2})

== See also ==
- List of gliders
