= Zauner OZ-5 One-Yankee =

American glider

OZ-5 One-Yankee

General information
- Type: Glider
- National origin: United States
- Designer: Otto Zauner
- Status: Production completed
- Number built: One

History
- Introduction date: 1974
- Developed from: Schreder RS-15

The Zauner OZ-5 One-Yankee is an American high-wing, T-tailed, single seat, 15 metre class glider that was designed and constructed by Otto Zauner.

== Design and development ==
Zauner designed a new fuselage and tail surfaces to mate with a set of Schreder RS-15 wings that he had built, producing a new aircraft.

The stock RS-15 wings of 15 m (49.2 ft) span are built from foam and sheet aluminium and feature flaps and a Schreder 1 airfoil, which is a modified Wortmann section. The fuselage consists of a welded steel tube cockpit cage, surrounded by a fiberglass shell. The rear fuselage is tapered and is made from sheet aluminium, as are the tail surfaces. The fin is highly swept and mounts the tailplane and elevators in T-tail configuration. The wings are carefully faired into the fuselage using integral fuselage fillets. The landing gear is a retractable monowheel.

Only one OZ-5 was built and it was registered in 1974 with the Federal Aviation Administration in the Experimental - Amateur-built category.

== Operational history ==
The designer completed two diamond badge legs in the OZ-5. As of July 2011 the aircraft remained on the FAA registry, still owned by Zauner.

== Specifications (OZ-5) ==
Data from Soaring

General characteristics

- Crew: one
- Wingspan: 49 ft 3 in (15 m)
- Wing area: 112.3 sq ft (10.43 m^{2})
- Aspect ratio: 21.4:1
- Airfoil: Schreder 1
- Empty weight: 450 lb (204 kg)
- Gross weight: 700 lb (318 kg)

Performance

- Maximum glide ratio: over 30:1
- Wing loading: 6.2 lb/sq ft (30 kg/m^{2})

== See also ==
Related lists

- List of gliders
