= Williams County Airport =

Public use airport in Bryan, Ohio

- IATA: none; ICAO: K0G6; FAA LID: 0G6

Summary
- Owner/Operator: Williams County Commissioners
- Serves: Bryan, Ohio
- Location: Williams County, Ohio
- Opened: 1964
- Time zone: UTC−05:00 (-5)
  - Summer (DST): UTC−04:00 (-4)
- Elevation AMSL: 730 ft (220 m)
- Coordinates: 41.4673°N 84.5067°W
- Website: www.williamscountyairport.com

Map
- Location of airport in Ohio 0G6 (the United States)

Runways
Direction	Length		Surface
Direction	ft	m	Surface
7/25	4,782	1,458	Asphalt

Statistics (2020)
- Aircraft Operations: 8030
- Source: Federal Aviation Administration

Williams County Airport (FAA LID: 0G6) is a publicly owned, public use general aviation airport serving Bryan, Ohio.

The airport hosts regular events, such as fly-in breakfasts and July 4th celebrations. The annual July 4th event includes historic planes, military aircraft, helicopters, and more. Plane rides are offered for purchase, and rides in vintage airplanes are auctioned.

== History ==
The Bryan Airport, built to replace a previous airport of the same name which had been located three miles north of the town, was scheduled to open in late 1959. (Note: The new location was actually the sixth airfield to exist near Bryan since 1918.) By late the following March, construction on an 8-unit, pole-barn-type hangar at the new site had been completed and flight operations were due to begin as soon as the weather improved. By late April 1962, Richard Schreder, a glider pilot and designer, purchased the 3,000 feet (910 m) dirt strip. By mid June of the following year, he had begun constructing a 12,000-square-foot (1,100 m^{2}) building, but it was twice damaged by high winds during construction. It was opened in November 1964, donated to the county in December and dedicated on 18 July 1965. By mid October, consideration was being given to lengthening the runway to 4,500 feet (1,400 m). A contract to extend the runway to 5,000 feet (1,500 m) was awarded in May 1967. The extension was dedicated in October. A contract to build a parallel taxiway and apron was awarded in early June 1970.

By mid December 1974, many of the surfaces at the airport needed repaving. The 15-Meter National Soaring Championships were held at the airport in summer 1976. A petition to rezone a neighboring 8-acre (3.2 ha) parcel for a new hangar was dropped in June 1977.

A three-phase plan to improve the airport was proposed as early as January 1983. The county requested a state grant to fund the improvements in September 1985. By that time, it was being used by the companies Aro, General Tire, Overland Express and Sohio. However, in March 1989, the airport board asked the county to consider replacing the portion of the plan that called for leasing the airport from Schraeder to buying it from him outright instead. (Note: Schrader owned the buildings and ramp, but not the runway.) Schraeder then offered to sell it to the county the following week, but the price was expected to be too high for the county to accept. The airport received a state grant in 1991 to improve drainage. The next year, Schraeder, who had been the airport manager for 28 years, retired from the role. Executive Air Service took over as the fixed-base operator in March 1994.

Following a suggestion by an airport design company in December 1997, a committee was formed by the county commissioners to study whether to purchase just under 175 acres (71 ha) of land surrounding the airport. In February 1998, the airport committee recommended that the county not purchase the airport as it lacked the resources to maintain and upgrade it. By that November, it was still considering purchasing the adjacent land.

The construction of a new terminal was proposed in 2005. However, by late March 2012 it had yet to be built and was again being promoted. The following month, an FAA plan to enlarge the apron, resurface the taxiway and install a new perimeter fence was presented to the county. After the purchase of just over 13 acres (5.3 ha) of land in 2015, a project to relocate the parallel taxiway farther from the runway while also extending it to the latter's full length was begun in mid 2016. (Note: By this time, a nearby retention pond, completed in 2000, had led to an increased risk of bird strikes due to geese landing there.) The first half of the project was almost complete by early August 2020.

In 2021, the airport received $32,000 during the COVID-19 pandemic to provide economic relief funds for cleaning services to combat the spread of pathogens.

== Facilities and aircraft ==
The airport has one runway, designated as runway 7/25. The runway measures 4,782 x 75 ft (1,458 x 23 m) and is paved with asphalt.

For the 12-month period ending August 7, 2020, the aircraft had 8030 annual flight operations, an average of 22 per day. This was nearly 100% general aviation and <1% military. For the same time period, 21 aircraft were based at the airport: 20 single-engine airplanes and 1 jet airplane.

The aircraft has a fixed-base operator that sells fuel, both avgas and jet fuel. Limited services, including catering, a lounge, and courtesy transportation, are available.

== Accidents and incidents ==
- On July 18, 2008, an Eagle Aircraft Co DW-1 agricultural aircraft crashed near the Williams County Airport. The pilot said that the airplane's fuel gauge was stuck and he thought that he had 30 minutes of fuel remaining, but the engine quit near the grass field where he wanted to land. The pilot then executed a forced landing to a field and nosed over. Upon inspection, no fuel was found in the fuel tanks. The probable cause of the accident was found to be a loss of engine power due to fuel exhaustion as a result of the pilot's improper fuel calculations. A contributing factor was the inaccurate fuel gauge.
- On August 12, 2020, a Cirrus SR22 was damaged when it struck a parked construction vehicle while taxiing at the Williams County Airport.

== See also ==
- List of airports in Ohio
