= Scoville (disambiguation) =

The Scoville scale is a measurement of the pungency (spicy heat) of chili peppers or other spicy foods.

Scoville may also refer to:

- Scoville Library, a library in Salisbury, Connecticut, U.S.
- Scoville Memorial Library (Carleton College), a historic building in Northfield, Minnesota, U.S.
- Scoville Park, a park in Oak Park, Illinois, U.S.
- Scoville Square or Scoville Block, a historic building in Oak Park, Illinois, U.S.
- Scoville Stardust, a homebuilt aircraft designed for air racing

== People with the surname ==
- Darrel Scoville (born 1975), Canadian ice hockey player
- Jonathan Scoville (1830–1891), U.S. Representative from New York
- Nick Scoville, American astronomer
- Wilbur Scoville (1865–1942), American pharmacist, known for the Scoville scale
- William Beecher Scoville (1906–1984), American neurosurgeon

== People with the given name ==
- Scoville Browne (1909–1994), American jazz reedist
- Scoville Jenkins (born 1986), American tennis player

== See also ==
- Escoville, a village in Normandy, France
- Herbert Scoville Jr. Peace Fellowship, an American intern program
