= Preiss RHJ-7 =

RJH-7

General information
- Type: Sailplane
- National origin: United States
- Manufacturer: Henry Preiss
- Designer: Henry Preiss
- Number built: 1

History
- First flight: 1966

The Preiss RHJ-7 is a side-by-side two-seat flapped glider developed by Preiss from a Schreder HP-14. The design used standard HP-14 wings with a 2 ft (0.6 m) center section added to the fuselage, V-tail, fixed undercarriage and a single control stick between the seats. The RHJ-7 first flew in 1966 and was the starting point for the RHJ-8 and RHJ-9 variants, also homebuilts.

== Specifications ==
General characteristics

- Crew: 1 pilot
- Capacity: 1 passenger
- Wingspan: 17.22886 m (56 ft 6 in)
- Wing area: 13 m^{2} (140 sq ft)
- Aspect ratio: 22.81r8
- Empty weight: 223 kg (492 lb)
- Gross weight: 404 kg (891 lb)

Performance

- Maximum glide ratio: 38 (at 105 km/h)
- Rate of sink: 0.61 m/s (120 ft/min)
