= Scheutzow Bee =

Bee

General information
- Type: Utility helicopter
- National origin: United States
- Manufacturer: Scheutzow Helicopter Corporation
- Designer: Webb Scheutzow
- Number built: 4

History
- First flight: 26 January 1967

The Scheutzow Model B or Scheutzow Bee was a two-seat utility helicopter developed in the United States in the late 1960s and early 1970s.

== Development ==
The aircraft was designed by Webb Scheutzow around a new type of rotorhead that he had developed, the FLEXIHUB. In this system, the two main rotor blades were mounted in rubber bushes, reducing vibration and requiring no lubrication. The design was otherwise entirely conventional, consisting of a cabin with two seats arranged side-by-side, a centrally mounted engine and rotor mast, and an open-truss tail boom of triangular section that carried a two-blade tail rotor. The undercarriage consisted of skids. The frame was constructed of welded steel tube and the cabin was constructed of sheet metal. Power was transmitted from the engine to the rotor by a series of belts, eliminating the need for a gearbox and minimizing cabin noise.

The prototype (registration N564A) first flew on 26 January 1967 and Scheutzow initially planned to have flight testing for type certification completed by the end of the year. At the time, Scheutzow hoped to sell the helicopter for somewhere in the region of $10,000–$12,000, although the following year, the estimated price rose to $16,700. Scheutzow still hoped that the helicopter would be in production the following year and planned to build 191 examples in 1969. However, the flight test program to obtain type certification did not commence until 1971. Certification tests were almost complete by the end of 1973, at which point funding ran out. Testing resumed again in February 1975 and the Bee was certified in May 1976. Development was abandoned during the 1970s after only four examples were built.

== Specifications ==
Data from Taylor, J.W.R. (1977), p.399

General characteristics

- Crew: one pilot
- Capacity: 1 passenger
- Length: 31 ft 2 in (9.50 m)
- Height: 8 ft 6 in (2.59 m)
- Empty weight: 1,135 lb (514 kg)
- Gross weight: 1,685 lb (764 kg)
- Powerplant: 1 × Lycoming IVO-360-A1A , 180 hp (134 kW)
- Main rotor diameter: 27 ft 0 in (8.23 m)
- Main rotor area: 573 sq ft (53.2 m^{2})

Performance

- Maximum speed: 94 mph (150 km/h, 82 kn)
- Range: 175 mi (280 km, 152 nmi)
- Service ceiling: 13,000 ft (1,960 m)
