= SCAL FB.30 =

1930s French light aircraft

General information
- Type: Two seat sport and tourer
- National origin: France
- Manufacturer: SCAL
- Designer: Antoine Bassou
- Number built: 3

History
- First flight: 1935

The SCAL FB.30 was a French twin boom, pusher configuration, two seat civil sport and touring aircraft designed by Antoine Bassou in the mid-1930s. Three, with different engines, were built and flown.

== Design and development ==
The SCAL FB.30 was a two seat monoplane with a two beam fuselage, a forward pod containing the cockpits and a low power engine at the rear. Antoine Bassou had produced several earlier two beam designs but these were tractor aircraft with the pod mounted well below the wing and the engine on the wing. In contrast, the FB.30's wing was set low on the pod.

It was a wooden aircraft with a three-part wing built around a single box spar. The short, rectangular plan central section carried the pod and the booms were attached to its undersides. The outer panels were tapered in plan out to semi-elliptical tips. The wing was plywood covered ahead of the spar and fabric-covered behind. Slotted ailerons filled almost all the outer panels' trailing edges and could be used as camber-changing flaps.

The pod was flat-sided, with the engine at the rear. The first FB.30 was powered by a 32 hp (24 kW), flat four Mengin and the second by a larger displacement, 40 hp (30 kW), Mengin G.H.M. The FB.31 had a 45 hp (34 kW), nine cylinder Salmson 9AD radial engine. There were two open cockpits, the passenger's over the centre of the wing and the pilot's well ahead of the leading edge.

The FB.30, unusually for its time, had a fixed tricycle undercarriage. The nose-wheel was mounted to the pod but the mainwheels were enclosed within the forward, V-section booms. Behind the wing trailing edge the booms became rectangular in section and at their ends extended upwards to carry the tailplane, with the fin was mounted on it but rigidly braced back to the booms by parallel struts. The rear control surfaces were straight-edged and unbalanced.

== Operational history ==
Only three airframes were built, no.1 with the smaller Mengin, no.2 with the Mengin GHM and no.3, the sole Salmson-powered FB.31. Dates of first flights of the FB.30s are uncertain though no.2 was built in 1935. The FB.31 first flew on 2 November 1936 and was certified in September 1937.

FB.30 no.2 was exported to the UK in June 1937 and registered there in October. Its time in the UK was short as it was lost in a fatal crash in June 1938.

The FB.31 flew again after World War II, registered as F-PFOL in late 1953, and participated in a 1954 air rally at Alencon from its base at Lyon. It was de-registered in 1977.

== Variants ==
FB.30
32–40 hp (24–30 kW) Mengin flat twin engines. Two built.
FB 31
45 hp (34 kW) nine cylinder Salmson 9AD radial engine. One built.

== Specifications (FB.30 no.1, 32 hp Mengin) ==
Data from L'Aeronautique November 1936

General characteristics

- Crew: one
- Capacity: one passenger
- Length: 6 m (19 ft 8 in)
- Wingspan: 9.25 m (30 ft 4 in)
- Height: 1.55 m (5 ft 1 in)
- Wing area: 12 m^{2} (130 sq ft)
- Empty weight: 260 kg (573 lb)
- Gross weight: 500 kg (1,102 lb)
- Powerplant: 1 × Mengin flat twin, 24 kW (32 hp)
- Propellers: 2-bladed pusher

Performance

- Maximum speed: 175 km/h (109 mph, 94 kn)
- Cruise speed: 135 km/h (84 mph, 73 kn)
- Minimum speed: 70 km/h (43 mph)
- Landing speed: 50 km/h (31 mph)
- Range: 1,000 km (620 mi, 540 nmi)
- Service ceiling: 4,800 m (15,700 ft) calculated
