= Schreder HP-7 =

American glider

HP-7

General information
- Type: Glider
- National origin: United States
- Designer: Richard Schreder
- Status: sole example destroyed 1957
- Primary user: Richard Schreder
- Number built: One

History
- Manufactured: 1957
- Introduction date: 1957
- First flight: 1957

The Schreder HP-7 was an American glider, the first design of Richard Schreder and the first in the long line of Schreder HP sailplanes.

== Design and development ==
Schreder built the HP-7 (HP stands for "high performance") in 1957 as a competition sailplane. Only one was built.

== Operational history ==
The HP-7 was completed just in time to finish the Federal Aviation Administration-mandated test flying for amateur-built aircraft before the 1957 US National soaring competition started. Schreder entered the competition with the aircraft and placed well.

The aircraft was destroyed in an aerotowing incident right after the US Nationals. Schreder decided not to build another HP-7, but drawing from his short experience with the aircraft that summer, he went on to design and build the Schreder Airmate HP-8, completing it for the 1958 season.

== See also ==
- List of gliders
