= Scroggs The Last Laugh =

The Last Laugh
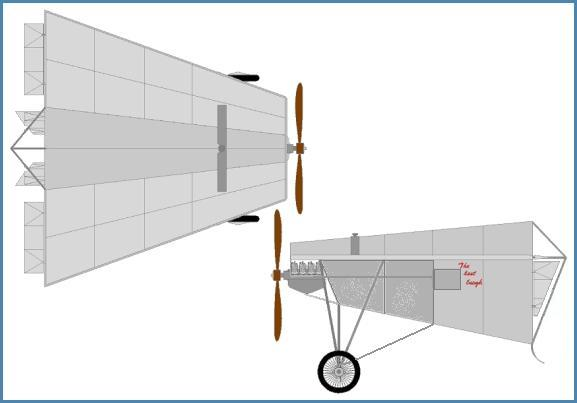
- Top and side views

General information
- Type: Private homebuilt
- National origin: United States
- Designer: Roy Scroggs
- Number built: 1

The Last Laugh was a prototype tailless dart-shaped aircraft built in 1929 by Roy Scroggs in the US. Designed as a lifting body, it was based on an earlier 1917 delta-winged patent.

It underwent flight testing but the design was not developed further.

== Origin ==
Roy Scroggs was a tailor living in Eugene, Oregon, US. He sought to develop an airplane that would bring safety, economy and STOL performance to everyday flying, and patented his first low-aspect-ratio delta design in 1917.

His unconventional ideas were rejected by aeronautical experts and he received much ridicule for his persistence. When he finally built a full-size machine in 1929, his chosen name, The Last Laugh, reflected his faith in his invention. The Handley Page HP.115 of 1961, designed to test the Concorde wing plan at low speeds, had a very similar delta leading edge angle of sweep.

== Design ==
Shaped like a long, narrow delta with the nose cut off, the aircraft was conceived as a lifting body, having a deep trapezoidal kite-section fuselage which tapered in proportion to the high-mounted, low aspect ratio wing. The fuselage thus formed a deep keel which provided both lift and directional stability. The original delta-winged design of 1917 proved impractical and the nose had to be drastically cut back to provide adequate mounting for an engine and propeller.

The structure was primarily of welded metal tubing with fabric covering. Twin main undercarriage wheels were located on struts immediately behind the engine, lifting the forward fuselage well clear of the ground. With the wings level the rear fuselage almost reached the ground and was fitted with a small tailskid.

The aircraft was powered by a 90 hp (67 kW) Curtiss OX-5 engine driving a two-bladed propeller.

The enclosed cockpit was located well aft in the wider part of the fuselage and initially had only two small side windows for vision. These were much increased in size before flight testing began. Aft of it the fuselage tapered more sharply to an angular tail with no separate fin.

A split rudder was fitted for lateral control, with each half attached to the fuselage at its widest and deepest point. Elevon control surfaces were also fitted on the wing trailing edge.

Modifications during flight testing included the addition of twin rudder surfaces, mounted aft of the fuselage on short struts.

== Career ==
The Last Laugh was registered in the US as NC10648.

It is claimed to have risen to about 10 ft (3 m) in flight.

Following initial flight tests he filed for a new patent on its design in July 1930.

The machine was damaged during attempted flight trials at Eugene Municipal Airport when it missed the taxiway and tipped over.

Its registration was cancelled in 1934.

== Specifications ==
Data from Eugene Guard 1929, unless otherwise stated.

General characteristics

- Length: 26 ft (7.9 m)
- Wingspan: 18 ft (5.5 m)
- Wing area: 350 sq ft (33 m^{2})
- Gross weight: 1,200 lb (544 kg)
- Powerplant: 1 × Curtiss OX-5 liquid-cooled V-8, 90 hp (67 kW)
- Propellers: 2-bladed, 10 ft (3.0 m) diameter (estimated)

Performance

- Wing loading: 3.5 lb/sq ft (17 kg/m^{2})
