= SC Paragliding =

Former Ukrainian aircraft manufacturer

- Company type: Privately held company
- Industry: Aerospace
- Founded: early 2000s
- Defunct: before 2016
- Headquarters: Kharkiv, Ukraine
- Products: Paragliders

SC Paragliding was a Ukrainian aircraft manufacturer based in Kharkiv. The company specialized in the design and manufacture of paragliders in the form of ready-to-fly aircraft.

The company seems to have been founded in the early 2000s and gone out of business before 2016.

In 2002, the company had introduced two models of paragliders, with just one size each. A year later, in 2003, they had a line that included the Discovery in seven sizes including two sizes for two-place flight training and the Scorpion in four sizes.

Reviewer Noel Bertrand in 2003 noted that the company was one of very few in that year offering a paraglider design for sale under €1,000.

== Aircraft ==
Summary of aircraft built by SC:

- SC Discovery
- SC Scorpion
