= Schweizer SGS 1-29 =

American sailplane

SGS 1-29
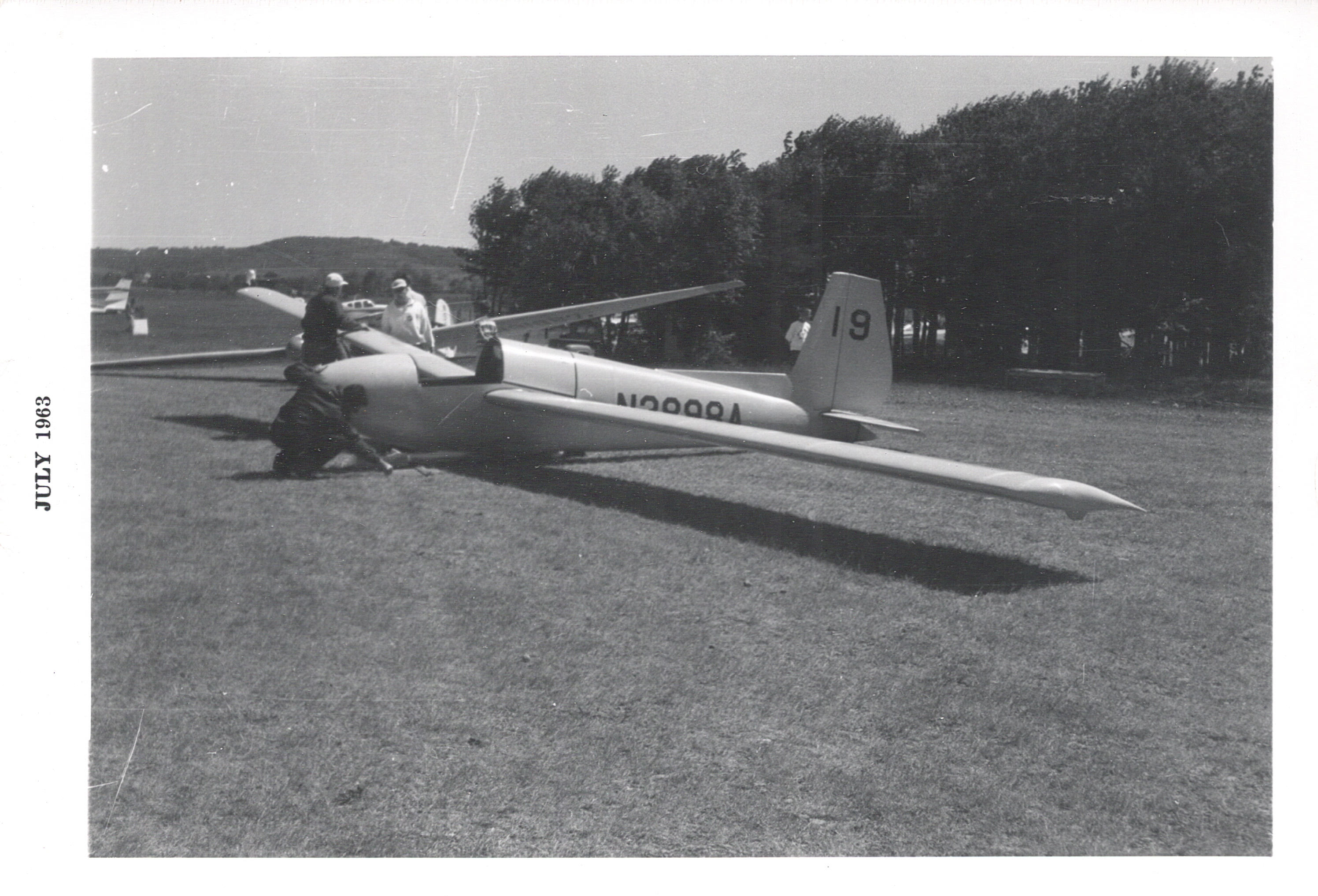
- Paul Schweizer's 1-29 at the 1963 US Soaring Championships at Harris Hill, Elmira, NY

General information
- Type: Experimental Standard-class sailplane
- National origin: United States
- Manufacturer: Schweizer Aircraft Corporation
- Designer: Ernest Schweizer
- Number built: 1

History
- First flight: 1958

The Schweizer SGS 1-29 is an American single-seat, mid-wing, experimental laminar flow airfoil glider built by Schweizer Aircraft of Elmira, New York.

The 1-29 is a development of the Schweizer SGS 1-23 that utilizes a 1-23 fuselage and a newly constructed set of 49.2 foot (15.0 m) span wings.

The aircraft was constructed to study the feasibility of producing improved boundary layer laminar flow on a metal-winged sailplane. Only one SGS 1-29 was produced and the project was not pursued further.

== Background ==
In the mid-1950s, the SGS 1-23 was in full production and through successive models was performing very well in competition. By 1957 the development of fiberglass-reinforced plastic affected the production of many sporting goods, such as boats and fishing rods. Schweizer Aircraft thought it was only a matter of time before a fiberglass sailplane was produced. This concern was borne out in 1965, when two German fiberglass sailplanes were entered in the world championships.

Schweizer Aircraft evaluated the use of fiberglass for sailplane construction and rejected it for several reasons:

- The high cost of demonstrating to the Federal Aviation Administration that this new material could safely be used for aircraft primary structure.
- Problems with crash resistance of fiberglass structures in high impact accidents.
- The unknown service life of fiberglass.
- The high degree of manual labor required to do fiberglass lay-ups at that time and the associated cost.

The company decided to concentrate on getting the best performance from the material that it knew best, aluminum.

Schweizer created several design studies of new sailplanes in the mid-1950s. These included:

- Schweizer 2-27
- Schweizer 7-28
- Schweizer SGS 1-29

Of these, only the SGS 1-29 proceeded to prototype stage.

== Design and development ==
The 1-29 was constructed using a modified SGS 1-23G fuselage. New wings were built for the aircraft to determine if better laminar flow could be achieved on a metal wing.

The wings were all-metal and of constant chord. The wing ribs were identical and created from a single master die to ensure uniformity. The wing features a thick, deep spar to reduce wing flexing and "oil-canning" that might interrupt laminar flow. The wing was assembled using flush rivets and has balanced top and bottom dive brakes.

The aircraft first flew in 1958 and flight testing was reported by Schweizer Aircraft as on-going through 1959.

The 1-29 program did yield positive results. The standard production model SGS 1-23H-15 with the same fuselage and wingspan as the 1-29 and a NACA 43012A airfoil, produced a best glide ratio of 29:1. With its laminar flow wing and NACA 63-618 airfoil the 1-29 recorded a 34:1 glide ratio, an improvement of 15%.

The 1-29 design was never certified and the sole aircraft that was built is an experimental aircraft in the "racing, exhibition" class and registered as N3898A.

== Operational history ==
The 1-29 was flown in at least three US national competitions by Paul A Schweizer, Bill Ivans and Tom Smith.

== Aircraft on display ==
Once the 1-29 test program was complete, the aircraft was donated to the National Soaring Museum where it is currently listed as being in storage.

== Specifications ==
General characteristics

- Crew: One
- Wingspan: 49 ft 3 in (15.00 m)
- Wing area: 154 sq ft (15.3 m^{2})
- Aspect ratio: 15.75
- Airfoil: NACA 63-618
- Empty weight: 465 lb (224 kg)
- Gross weight: 750 lb (340 kg)

Performance

- Maximum glide ratio: 34 at 52 mph (83 km/h)
- Rate of sink: 123 ft/min (0.63 m/s)

== See also ==
Related lists

- List of experimental aircraft
- List of gliders
