= Société de Constructions et d'Aviation Légère =

French Aircraft

Société Constructions d'Aviation Légère (SCAL)
- Company type: aircraft design and manufacture
- Industry: aircraft
- Founded: 1936
- Defunct: c. 1948
- Fate: ceased operations
- Headquarters: Paris, France
- Key people: Felix and Antoine Bassou
- Products: light aircraft

Société Constructions d'Aviation Légère (SCAL) was a small French aircraft manufacturer of light aircraft during the 1930s and 1940s.

== Company history ==
SCAL was established in 1936 by the brothers Felix and Antoine Bassou with a factory in Paris. The company designed and built a small series of light two-seat sporting and touring aircraft for use by private pilot owners. The last design appeared c. 1938 and the company is no longer in existence.

== Aircraft designs ==
Three SCAL types were flown.

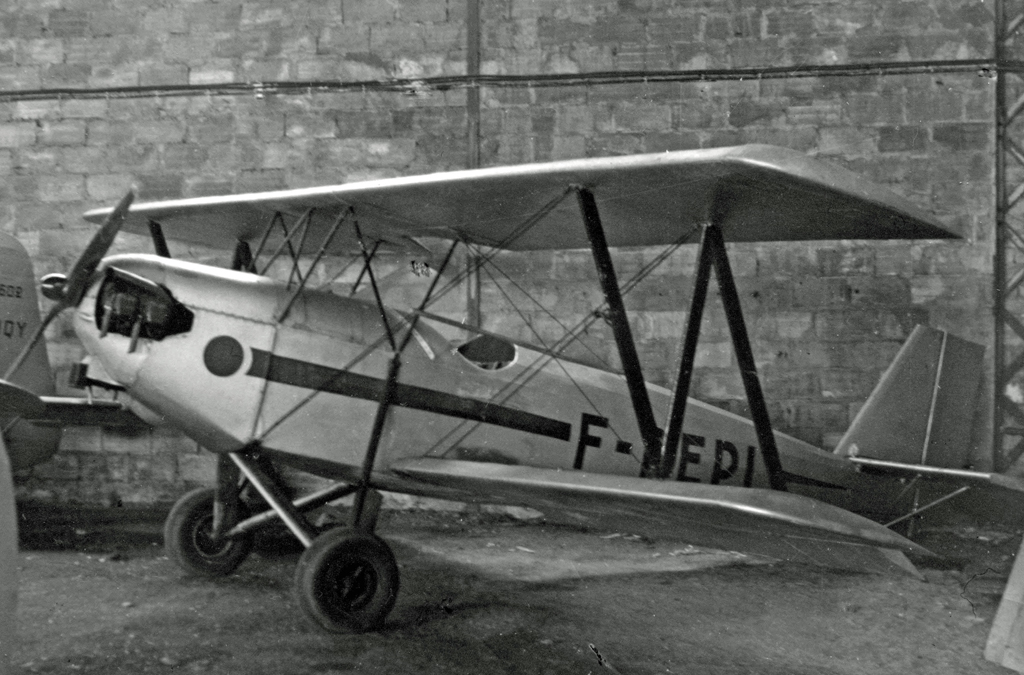
The sole FB.41 Rubis at St Cyr l'Ecole airfield near Paris in 1957

The FB.20 was a monoplane from about 1936 but beyond that nothing further is known.

The FB.30/31 was a pusher, twin boom, two seat touring aircraft: three built, with different engines.

The FB.40/1 was a side-by-side seat biplane trainer. Two different engines were available pre-war and other engines were used post-war.
