= Schreder HP-12 =

American glider

HP-12

General information
- Type: Glider
- National origin: United States
- Designer: Richard Schreder
- Status: sole example destroyed
- Primary user: Richard Schreder
- Number built: 1

History
- Introduction date: 1965
- First flight: 1965

The Schreder HP-12 was an American FAI Standard Class glider designed by Richard Schreder for the 1965 World Gliding Championships.

The HP-12 is often confused with a completely different aircraft, the Schreder HP-12A.

== Design and development ==
The HP-12 (HP stands for high performance) was an all-metal sailplane that Schreder developed to take to the United Kingdom for the 1965 World Championships held in South Cerney, England.

== Operational history ==
The sole HP-12 built was being flown by John Karlovich when it suffered a structural failure over Marfa, Texas while flying in the 1972 US Nationals. Karlovich successfully bailed out of the aircraft, but the HP-12 was destroyed.

== Specifications (HP-12) ==
General characteristics

- Crew: 1

== See also ==
- List of gliders
