= Schweizer SA 2-31 =

General information
- Type: Light aircraft
- National origin: United States of America
- Manufacturer: Schweizer Aircraft
- Number built: One

History
- First flight: July 1960
- Developed from: Schweizer SA 1-30

The Schweizer SA 2-31 was a development of the Schweizer SA 1-30 into a two-seat aircraft.

== Design and development ==
Schweizer developed a line of gliders starting in World War II. The 2-31 was not intended to be a motor glider, but rather a light aircraft utilizing some glider and sailplane technologies, common parts with other Schweizer designs and an affordable price as a result of using smaller powerplants. It was developed from the SA 1-30 on the assumption that there would be more of a market for a two-seat aircraft. The fuselage was based on that of the 1-30 with strengthened 1-26B wings.

== Operational history ==
The prototype first flew in July 1960, but the type was not put into production because it was thought that the cost of setting up a production line would be too great to compete with other two-seat aircraft available at the time.

The sole example was later resdesigned by Les Schweizer as the 2-31A.

== Specifications (Schweizer SA 2-31) ==
Data from Schweizer, Paul A.

General characteristics

- Crew: one
- Capacity: one passenger
- Length: 21 ft (6.4 m)
- Wingspan: 36 ft (11 m)
