= Schreder HP-16 =

American glider

HP-16

General information
- Type: Glider
- National origin: United States
- Designer: Richard Schreder
- Status: No longer in production
- Number built: about 20

History
- Introduction date: circa 1971
- Developed from: HP-15

The Schreder HP-16 is an American mid-wing, single seat, V tailed, FAI Standard Class glider that was designed by Richard Schreder.

== Design and development ==
After the failure of the HP-15 to perform well in the 1969 US Nationals Schreder started the HP-16 with a new design philosophy. Avoiding the extremely high aspect ratio that the 15 had, he opted for a more modest 21.5:1 aspect ratio and larger wing area to improve performance in weak conditions. The HP-16's wing has 50% more wing area than the HP-15 and uses a Wortmann 67-150 airfoil.

Like other Schreder designs the HP-16 is of all-metal construction, but with the wing skins bonded to foam ribs rather than using rivets to provide a smoother surface. The bonded construction also cut building time. The wing features the signature Schreder 90° flaps that allow steep descents and the use of small fields for landing.

The HP-16s were all amateur-built aircraft and about 20 were completed and flown.

== Operational history ==
In April 2011 there were still eleven HP-16s registered with the US Federal Aviation Administration and two registered with Transport Canada.

== Aircraft on display ==
- National Soaring Museum - 1, listed as "in storage"

== Specifications (variant specified) ==
Data from Sailplane Directory and Soaring

General characteristics

- Crew: one
- Wingspan: 49 ft 3 in (15 m)
- Wing area: 113 sq ft (10.5 m^{2})
- Aspect ratio: 21.5
- Airfoil: Wortmann 67-150
- Empty weight: 500 lb (227 kg) including 200 lbs (90 kg) of water ballast.
- Gross weight: 924.5 lb (419 kg)

Performance

- Maximum glide ratio: 36:1 at 55 mph (89 km/h)
- Rate of sink: 130 ft/min (0.66 m/s) at 50 mph (80 km/h)
- Wing loading: 8.18 lb/sq ft (39.9 kg/m^{2}) with water ballast

== See also ==
- List of gliders
