= Schütte-Lanz D.II =

D.II

General information
- Type: Fighter
- Manufacturer: Schütte-Lanz
- Designer: Walter Stein
- Primary user: Luftstreitkräfte
- Number built: 1

History
- Manufactured: 1915
- Variant: Schütte-Lanz D.I

The Schütte-Lanz D.II was a variant of the Schütte-Lanz D.I. The only change was a new engine - the 100 hp Mercedes D.I 6-cylinder water-cooled engine replacing the 80 hp Oberursel U.0 rotary engine in the D.I. The aircraft was never flown.

== Specifications ==
Data from Green and Swanborough (1994) p.520

General characteristics

- Crew: 1
- Length: 5.40 m (17 ft 9 in)
- Wingspan: 7.50 m (24 ft 7 in)
- Powerplant: 1 × Mercedes D.I 6-cyl. water-cooled in-line piston engine, 75 kW (101 hp)

Performance

- Maximum speed: 135 km/h (84 mph, 73 kn)

== Bibliography ==
- William Green and Gordon Swanborough. The Complete Book of Fighters. Colour Library Direct, Godalming, UK: 1994. ISBN 1-85833-777-1
