= Schütte-Lanz C.I =

WWI German reconnaissance aircraft

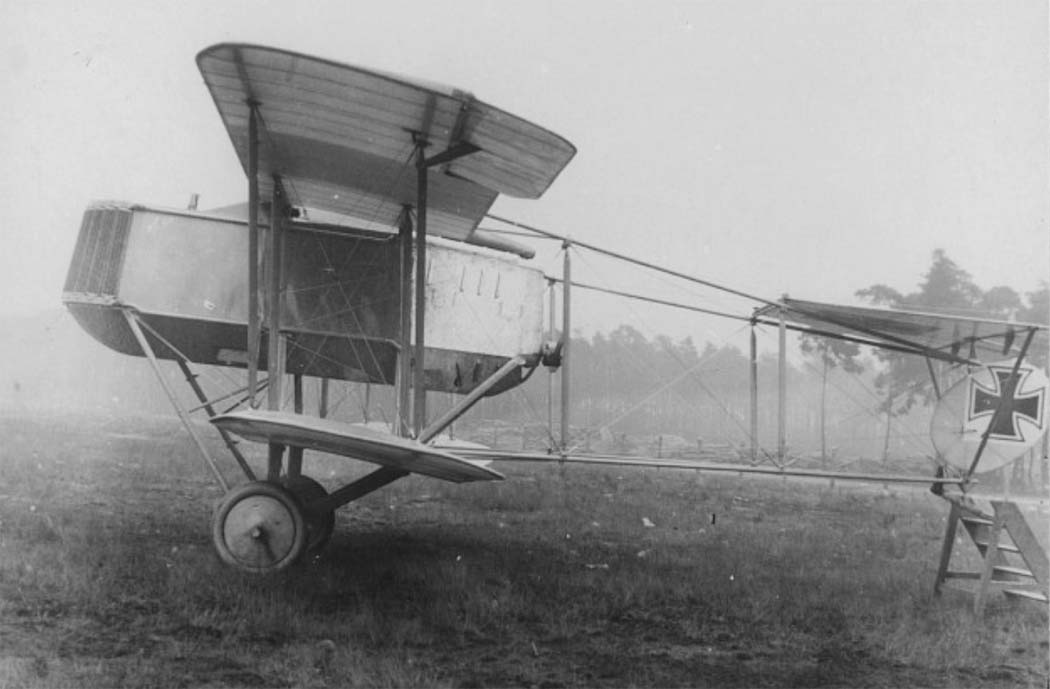

General information
- Type: reconnaissance
- Manufacturer: Luftfahrzeugbau Schütte-Lanz
- Designer: Walter Stein
- Primary user: Luftstreitkräfte
- Number built: 1

History
- First flight: 1915

The Schütte-Lanz C.I was a German reconnaissance aircraft prototype of World War I.

== Design ==
The aircraft was a double wooden biplane equipped with a 160 hp Mercedes D.III engine. The observer was in the bow cabin, which provided a good overview and was armed with a 7.92-mm Parabellum machine gun on a movable turret.

== Development ==
The C.I was the first airplane built by Schütte-Lanz, which had specialized in airship construction. The prototype made its first flight in 1915, but the aircraft did not enter production.

== Specifications ==
Data from

General characteristics

- Crew: 2 (pilot and observer)
- Length: 5.20 m (17 ft 1 in)
- Wingspan: 7.70 m (25 ft 3 in)
- Powerplant: 1 × Mercedes D.III 6-cyl. water-cooled in-line piston engine, 120 kW (160 hp)
- Propellers: 2-bladed wooden fixed pitch propeller

Performance

- Maximum speed: 201 km/h (125 mph, 109 kn)

Armament

- Guns: 1 x 7.9 mm (0.311 in) Parabellum machine gun on a mobile turret
