= Schreder HP-14 =

American single-seat glider

HP-14

General information
- Type: Club class Sailplane
- Manufacturer: Homebuilt
- Designer: Richard Schreder

History
- First flight: 1966
- Variants: Preiss RHJ-7; Preiss RHJ-8; Preiss RHJ-9; Bikle T-6

The HP-14 is a Richard Schreder-designed all-metal glider aircraft that was offered as a kit for homebuilding during the 1960s and 1970s. It was originally developed by retrofitting improved wings to the fuselage and tail of the HP-13, and first flew in 1966. Schreder won the 1966 US national soaring championship in the prototype HP-14.

The HP-14 features a folding V-tail and 90-degree flaps for glidepath control. The fuselage and wings are of all-aluminum riveted construction.

== Development ==
Development of the HP-14 was carried out by several parties but the biggest modifications to the design were carried out by Slingsby Aviation at Kirkbymoorside, North Yorkshire, England, where a 20-metre wing was fitted on the prototype HP-14C, along with an enlarged V-tail. Later Slingsby production aircraft had a conventional cruciform tail. Slingsby production and sales were hampered by certification problems, particularly with flap actuation at high speed, and the disastrous fire at Kirbymoorside on 18 November 1968. Slingsby produced only three aircraft. Other homebuilders incorporated their own modifications but none achieved production status.

== Variants ==
HP-14
Developed from a modified HP-13 fuselage, with V-tail, using the Wortmann section wings of the Schreder HP-12
HP-14C
An 18-meter span HP-14 produced by Slingsby with a conventional cruciform tail, flown by Nicholas Goodhart at the 1968 World Championships at Leszno in Poland. The initial prototype used an enlarged V-tail.
HP-14T
The HP-14 fitted with the 18-meter 'C' wing and a T-tail.
Krutchkoff SHP-1
An HP-14 with a new fuselage designed by Andre Krutchkoff.
Zauner OZ-4
Modified version with a 19.2 m (63.0 ft) wingspan and a 850 lb (386 kg) gross weight.

== Specifications (Slingsby HP-14C) ==
HP-14

Data from Coates, Andrew. "Jane's World Sailplanes & Motor Gliders new edition". London, Jane's. 1980. ISBN 0-7106-0017-8

General characteristics

- Crew: 1
- Length: 23 ft 10.5 in (7.28 m)
- Wingspan: 59 ft 0.5 in (18 m)
- Height: 3 ft 11 in (1.19 m)
- Wing area: 146.2 sq ft (13.58 m^{2})
- Aspect ratio: 23.9
- Airfoil: Wortmann FX-61-163
- Empty weight: 639 lb (290 kg)
- Gross weight: 840 lb (381 kg)

Performance

- Maximum speed: 134 mph (216 km/h, 116 kn)
- Maximum glide ratio: 44 @ 96 km/h (60 mph)
- Rate of sink: 98.4 ft/min (0.50 m/s)
