= Preiss RHJ-8 =

RHJ-8

General information
- Type: Two-seat sailplane
- National origin: Windsor, Ontario, Canada
- Manufacturer: Homebuilt
- Designer: Henry Preiss
- Number built: 3

History
- First flight: 1970
- Developed from: Preiss RHJ-8

The Preiss RHJ-8 is a homebuilt side-by-side two-seat flapped glider. It is an evolution of the Preiss RHJ-7, which was developed from a Schreder HP-14. First flown in 1970. The wingspan was slightly increased and the empennage was changed to a T-configuration, with the stabilator mounted atop the vertical stabilizer. The undercarriage is partially retractable (modified by some builders to be fully retractable) and the large canopy swings open to the rear.

== Specifications ==
General characteristics

- Crew: one pilot
- Capacity: one passenger
- Length: 22 ft 10 in (6.95 m)
- Wingspan: 58 ft 0 in (17.68 m)
- Wing area: 145 sq ft (13.5 m^{2})
- Aspect ratio: 23.2
- Empty weight: 570 lb (259 kg)
- Gross weight: 1,000 lb (454 kg)

Performance

- Maximum glide ratio: 38 estimated
