= SCA SFR-10 =

1930s French aircraft

SFR-10

General information
- Type: Tourism aircraft
- National origin: France
- Manufacturer: Société Commercial Aéronautique (SCA)
- Number built: 1

History
- First flight: 16 October 1931

The SCA SFR-10 was a tourism aircraft built by Société Commercial Aéronautique (SCA) in France, in the early 1930s.

== Design ==
The SFR-10 featured a high-wing monoplane layout of all-wood construction.

== Specifications ==
Data from

General characteristics

- Crew: 1
- Capacity: 2 pax
- Length: 8.00 m (26 ft 3 in)
- Wingspan: 13.50 m (44 ft 3 in)
- Height: 2 m (6 ft 7 in)
- Wing area: 22.40 m^{2} (241.1 sq ft)
- Empty weight: 598 kg (1,318 lb)
- Gross weight: 960 kg (2,116 lb)
- Powerplant: 1 × Renault 4Pb 4-cylinder inverted air-cooled in-line piston engine, 73 kW (98 hp)
- Propellers: 2-bladed fixed-pitch propeller

Performance

- Maximum speed: 190 km/h (120 mph, 100 kn)
