= Schütte-Lanz D.I =

D.I
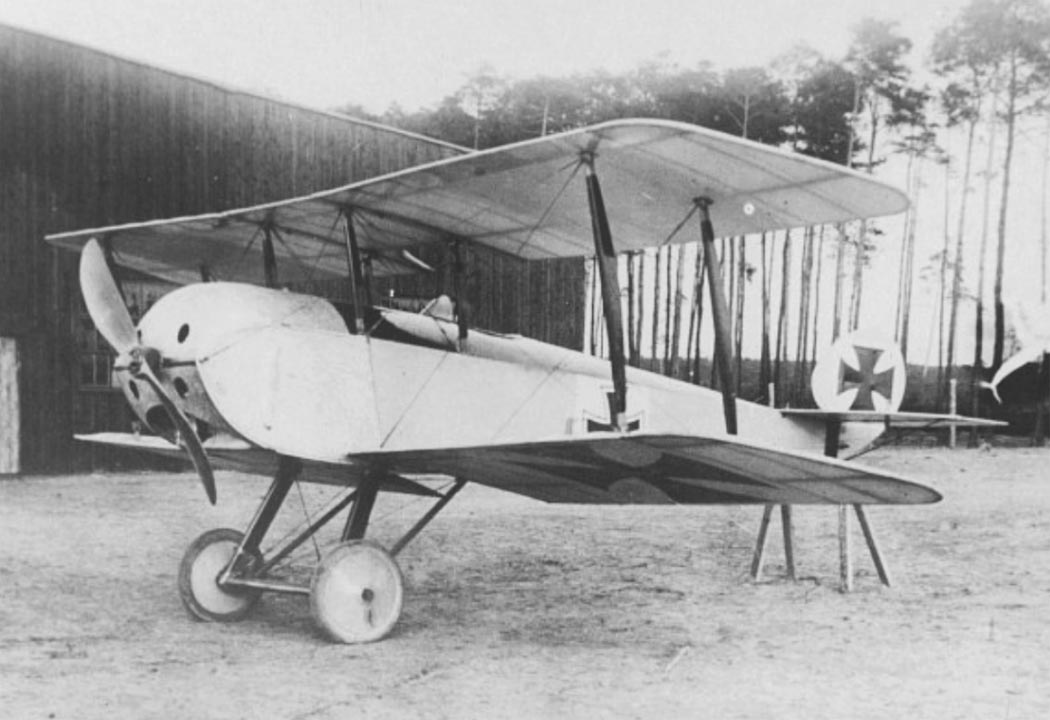

General information
- Type: Fighter
- Manufacturer: Schütte-Lanz
- Designer: Walter Stein
- Primary user: Luftstreitkräfte
- Number built: 1

History
- Manufactured: 1915
- Introduction date: never
- First flight: 1915

The Schütte-Lanz D.I was a German single-seat biplane fighter, often said to be Germany's first biplane attack aircraft. The D.I was light-weight and made of wood covered in fabric, apparently based on the design of the British Sopwith Tabloid.

== Operational history ==
After Idflieg testing in 1915, the plane was rejected on the grounds that the biplane design afforded less vision to the pilot than a monoplane and was consequently unsuitable for use as a fighter. A modified version, the Schütte-Lanz D.II was produced in the same year.

== Specifications ==
General characteristics

- Crew: 1
- Length: 5.4 m (17 ft 9 in)
- Wingspan: 7.5 m (24 ft 7 in)
- Powerplant: 1 × Oberursel U.0 7-cyl. air-cooled rotary piston engine, 60 kW (80 hp)

Performance

- Maximum speed: 135 km/h (84 mph, 73 kn)

== Bibliography ==
- William Green and Gordon Swanborough. The Complete Book of Fighters. Colour Library Direct, Godalming, UK: 1994. ISBN 1-85833-777-1
