= Schütte-Lanz D.VI =

D.VI

General information
- Type: Parasol wing fighter aircraft
- National origin: Germany
- Manufacturer: Luftschiffbau Schütte-Lanz
- Number built: 1

History
- First flight: 29 May 1918

The Schütte-Lanz D.VI was a single engine, parasol wing fighter aircraft designed and built in Germany towards the end of World War I. It had a very short career, crashing on its first flight.

== Design ==
The wing of the D.VI was of constant chord, with straight edges and square tips. It was mounted with slight sweep over the fuselage, parasol fashion, primarily braced by a pair of long parallel struts on each side from the lower fuselage to points well out along the wings. It was supported centrally on two outward leaning pairs of short parallel cabane struts from the upper fuselage. Unusually the space between each main strut pair was faired-in with a lift-providing aerofoil, supplementing the wing. These surfaces extended from the lower fuselage strut junction to the level of the cockpit and upper fuselage, the rest of the struts being normally exposed.

The D.VI was powered by a 119 kW (160 hp) Mercedes D.III water cooled six cylinder inline engine. The fuselage behind was rectangular in cross section and flat sided, with the single cockpit under the wing trailing edge where there was a small cut-out to aid the pilot's vision. The tailplane was placed on top of the fuselage and like the vertical tail was essentially straight edged. The rudder was balanced and extended down to the keel, moving in a cut-out between the elevators. The fixed conventional undercarriage had a single axle mounted on a pair of V-struts, aided by a sprung tailskid.

Its first flight was on 29 May 1918. It crashed and was seriously damaged, but never rebuilt.

== Specifications ==
Data from The Complete Book of Fighters, p.521

General characteristics

- Crew: 1
- Length: 6.51 m (21 ft 4 in)
- Wingspan: 10.80 m (35 ft 5 in)
- Powerplant: 1 × Mercedes D.III 6-cylinder inline, 120 kW (160 hp)
