= Schütte-Lanz G.IV =

G.IV

General information
- Type: bomber
- National origin: Imperial Germany
- Manufacturer: Luftschiffbau Schütte-Lanz

The Schütte-Lanz G.IV was a bomber designed at the Luftschiffbau Schütte-Lanz (Schütte-Lanz airship works), in Germany, that remained a project, with no aircraft being built. The G.IV was to have been a twin-engined triplane

General characteristics Performance
