= Schreder HP-21 =

American motor glider project

HP-21

General information
- Type: Glider
- National origin: United States
- Designer: Richard Schreder
- Number built: none

History
- First flight: none

The Schreder HP-21 was an American high-wing, variable geometry, V tailed, single seat motor glider project that was designed by Richard Schreder. None was ever completed or flown.

== Design and development ==
The HP-21 project was publicly announced in August 1982 in Soaring Magazine. Schreder said at that time: "the HP-21 will out-perform any other factory-built 15-Meter racer now in production."

In April 1984 the design was revealed as a high performance V-tailed single seater, with a retractable KFM 107e powerplant of 25 hp (19 kW) for self-launching, mounted behind the cockpit and retracting rearward to lie in a bay. The propeller remained exposed when the engine was retracted. The non-tapered wing had a carbon fiber spar with a span of 49.2 ft (15.0 m) and a chord of only 18 in (46 cm), with winglets fitted. The wing incorporated a hand-crank operated retractable Dacron sailcloth flap that was intended to be extended for thermalling and retracted for glides. The flap was of triangular shape and when deployed would extend from the wing root to a point just inboard of the ailerons. The flap retracted by winding around a chrome-moly steel tube located inside the wing.

Schreder went on to start work on the HP-22 before the HP-21 was finished and, even though the prototype HP-21 carried the registration of N38100, it was never registered and there is no indication that it was ever completed or flown.

== Specifications (HP-21) ==
Data from Soaring

General characteristics

- Crew: one
- Wingspan: 49 ft 3 in (15 m)
- Wing area: 74 sq ft (6.9 m^{2}) flap retracted
- Aspect ratio: 32.8:1
- Powerplant: 1 × KFM 107e , 25 hp (19 kW)
- Propellers: 2-bladed wooden

== See also ==
- List of gliders
