= Schreder HP-15 =

American glider

HP-15

General information
- Type: Standard-class sailplane
- National origin: United States
- Manufacturer: Homebuilt
- Designer: Richard Schreder
- Number built: 1

History
- First flight: ca. 1969

The Schreder HP-15 sailplane prototype was designed by Richard Schreder as a personal mount in which to challenge the 1969 U.S. National Soaring Championships.

== Design and development ==
With an extreme 33:1 aspect ratio and a relatively low empty weight, the HP-15 was expected to generate less induced drag and therefore higher performance. The type achieved excellent glide ratios in fast flight, but had disappointing climbing ability, due to extensive flow separation on the upper wing surfaces during slow flight and Schreder and the HP-15 finished in 65th place. After the Championships Schreder re-winged the fuselage to produce his next design, the HP-16.

== Operational history ==
In the April 2011 the sole HP-15 prototype, registered N5488, still existed and was privately registered in Peoria, Illinois.

== Specifications ==
General characteristics

- Crew: One
- Length: 22 ft 10 in (6.95 m)
- Wingspan: 49 ft 3 in (15.0 m)
- Wing area: 72 sq ft (7.0 m^{2})
- Aspect ratio: 33
- Empty weight: 330 lb (150 kg)
- Gross weight: 600 lb (272 kg)

Performance

- Rate of sink: 98 ft/min (0.49 m/s)
