= Schweizer SA 1-30 =

American light aircraft

General information
- Type: Homebuilt aircraft
- National origin: United States of America
- Manufacturer: Schweizer Aircraft
- Number built: One

History
- First flight: July 1958
- Developed from: Schweizer SGS 1-26
- Variant: Schweizer SA 2-31

The Schweizer SA 1-30 was the first entry by Schweizer in the powered aircraft market.

== Design and development ==
Schweizer developed a line of gliders starting in World War II. The 1-30 was not intended to be a motor glider, but rather a light aircraft utilizing some glider and sailplane technologies, common parts with other Schweizer designs and an affordable price as a result of using smaller powerplants. Removable wings, and the ability to be transported by trailer were also criteria for keeping airport-based hangar costs down.

The 1-30 shares the same wings and tail surfaces as the 1-26 glider. The fuselage is of aluminum construction with a welded steel tube tail structure. The wings are removable using the same design as the 1-26. The engine uses a cowling with exposed cylinders like a J-3 Cub for simplicity and cooling efficiency. Wing mounted spoilers were retained from the 1-26, allowing steep low-speed descents at about a 5:1 glide ratio. Three sets of wings were tested including a set from the model 2-31.

== Operational history ==
Construction of the prototype was started in April 1958 and completed by August. The aircraft was tested as a glider aero-towing aircraft using a Schweizer SGU 2-22C. The single-place 1-30 was not intended to go into production, the two-place 2-31 was envisioned as the production model, but was also not produced beyond a single prototype.

== Variants ==
SAU 1-30
The SA 1-30 modified with a 4 ft (122 cm) shorter wing and a fully cowled engine.

== Specifications (Schweizer SA 1-30) ==
Data from Sport Aviation

General characteristics

- Capacity: 1
- Length: 20 ft 3 in (6.17 m)
- Wingspan: 40 ft (12 m)
- Wing area: 160 sq ft (15 m^{2})
- Aspect ratio: 10
- Empty weight: 700 lb (318 kg)
- Gross weight: 1,100 lb (499 kg)
- Powerplant: 1 × Continental A65 , 65 hp (48 kW)

Performance

- Maximum speed: 96 kn (110 mph, 180 km/h)
- Cruise speed: 87 kn (100 mph, 160 km/h)
- Stall speed: 33 kn (38 mph, 61 km/h)
- Rate of climb: 1,000 ft/min (5.1 m/s)

Related development Schweizer SA 2-31
