= Schütte-Lanz D.III =

Fighter prototype of Germany

General information
- Type: fighter
- Manufacturer: Luftfahrzeugbau Schütte-Lanz
- Designer: Walter Stein
- Primary user: Luftstreitkräfte
- Number built: 1

History
- First flight: January 1918

The Schütte-Lanz D.III was a German fighter prototype during World War I. It participated in the first Idflieg D competition at Adlershof, Germany in January and February 1918. It was a conventional single-bay staggered biplane with N-type interplane struts. Constructed of wood with fabric skinning, the D.III gave an unspectacular performance: production was never continued.

== Variants ==
Dr.I
The Dr.I was a triplane using the fuselage, empennage, engine and undercarriage (apart from a slightly repositioned tailskid) of the D.III. The new wings had a smaller span (6.50 m (21 ft 4 in)) but had single bays and N-struts as before. The centre wing was attached to the upper fuselage and the upper one supported over the cockpit on a N-strutted cabane. Unusually, though there was stagger between the lower pair of wings, there was none between the upper two. The Dr.I took part in the second D competition, held from 27 May to 28 June 1918.

== Specifications ==
Data from The Complete Book of Fighters

General characteristics

- Crew: 1
- Length: 6.5 m (21 ft 4 in)
- Wingspan: 8 m (26 ft 3 in)
- Gross weight: 860 kg (1,896 lb)
- Powerplant: 1 × Mercedes D.III 6-cyl. water-cooled in-line piston engine, 120 kW (160 hp)
- Propellers: 2-bladed wooden fixed pitch propeller

Performance

- Maximum speed: 195 km/h (121 mph, 105 kn)
- Rate of climb: 2.61 m/s (514 ft/min)
- Time to altitude: 1,000 m (3,300 ft) in 3 minutes, 5,000 m (16,000 ft) in 31.9 minutes

Armament

- Guns: 2 x 7.9 mm (0.311 in) LMG 08/15 machine guns

== Bibliography ==
- William Green and Gordon Swanborough. The Complete Book of Fighters. Colour Library Direct, Godalming, UK: 1994. ISBN 1-85833-777-1.
