= Scoville Stardust =

Stardust JS-2

General information
- Type: Homebuilt aircraft
- National origin: United States
- Designer: J.R. Scoville

The Scoville Stardust JS-2 is a homebuilt aircraft designed for air racing.

== Design and development ==
The Stardust is a single place midwing aircraft with a single engine and conventional landing gear. The fuselage is constructed of welded steel tubing with fabric covering. The wings are all wood construction.

== Variants ==
Stardust II
Initial version
Stardust JS-2
Second version, powered by an 85 to 100 hp (63 to 75 kW) Continental engine.

== Specifications (Stardust JS-2) ==
Data from Air Trails

General characteristics

- Crew: one
- Length: 18 ft (5.5 m)
- Wingspan: 16 ft (4.9 m)
- Height: 5 ft 7 in (1.70 m)
- Wing area: 66 sq ft (6.1 m^{2})
- Empty weight: 520 lb (236 kg)
- Gross weight: 790 lb (358 kg)
- Fuel capacity: 15 U.S. gallons (57 L; 12 imp gal)
- Powerplant: 1 × Continental C85 Horizontally opposed piston aircraft engine, 85 hp (63 kW)
- Propellers: 2-bladed

Performance

- Maximum speed: 224 kn (258 mph, 415 km/h)
- Cruise speed: 155 kn (178 mph, 286 km/h)
- Stall speed: 50 kn (58 mph, 93 km/h)
- Range: 430 nmi (500 mi, 800 km)
- Rate of climb: 900 ft/min (4.6 m/s)

== See also ==
Aircraft of comparable role, configuration, and era

- Wittman DFA
