= Scintex Rubis =

French light aircraft

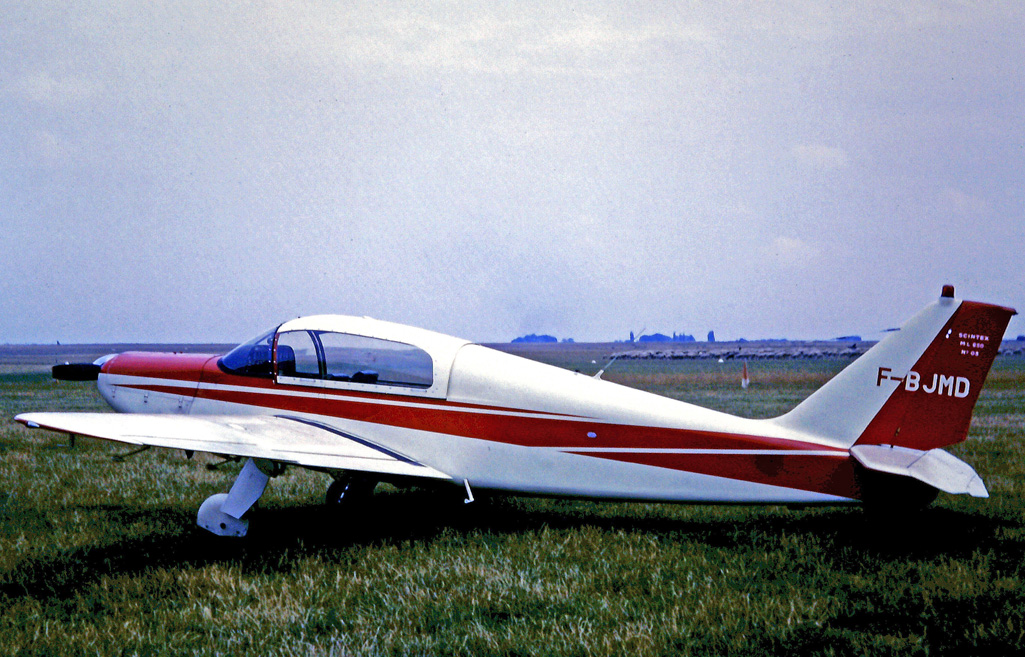
- Scintex Rubis at Guyancourt airfield, Paris, in 1965

General information
- Type: General aviation aircraft
- National origin: France
- Manufacturer: Scintex-Aviation
- Primary user: Private owners
- Number built: 8

History
- Introduction date: 1964
- First flight: 3 June 1962
- Developed from: ML 145

The Scintex ML 250 Rubis was a French civil utility aircraft of the 1960s.

== Design and development ==
Scintex Aviation had manufactured the two-seat Emeraude from the late 1950s. In 1960 the firm designed the ML 145 four-seat low-wing cabin monoplane, powered by a 145 h.p. Continental O-300-B engine, the single example of which first flew on 25 May 1961.

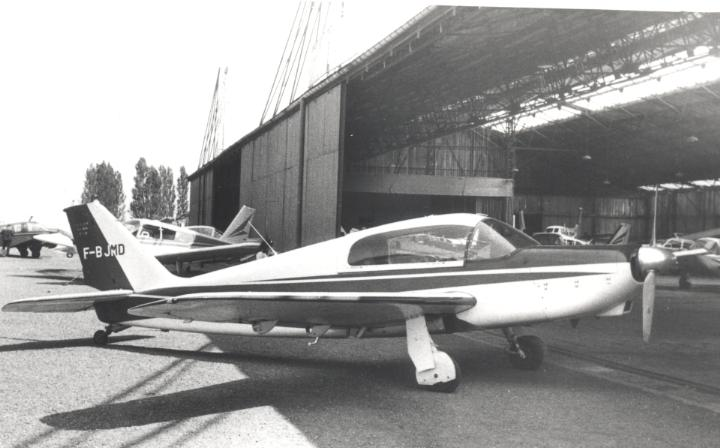
Scintex Rubis at Toussus-le-noble airfield in 1967

Scintex developed the ML 250 with a larger five-seat cabin and fitted with a 250 hp (186 kW) Lycoming O-540 engine. This first flew on 3 June 1962. The aircraft was of a graceful design, using an all-wood construction, having a semi-monocoque plywood-covered fuselage and cantilever tapered low wing. The tail fin was swept and the aircraft, unusually, was fitted with a fully retractable tailwheel undercarriage.

== Production and service ==
Eight production examples of the ML 250 Rubis were completed by Scintex during 1964-1965. Whilst the type had an advanced specification, it suffered from competition from contemporary all-metal aircraft types such as the Piper Comanche. The Rubis has remained in service with French private pilots and four were airworthy in 2005. Two of these, including the aircraft pictured right (F-BJMD) were still active on the French civil aircraft register in 2015.

== Specifications ==
Data from Jane's All The World's Aircraft 1965–66

General characteristics

- Crew: 1
- Capacity: 3–4 passengers
- Length: 7.75 m (25 ft 5 in)
- Wingspan: 10.25 m (33 ft 8 in)
- Height: 1.90 m (6 ft 3 in)
- Wing area: 14.78 m^{2} (159.1 sq ft)
- Aspect ratio: 7:1
- Airfoil: root: NACA 23015 tip: NACA 23009
- Empty weight: 800 kg (1,764 lb)
- Max takeoff weight: 1,475 kg (3,252 lb)
- Fuel capacity: 52 L (14 US gal; 11 imp gal)
- Powerplant: 1 × Lycoming O-540-A1D5 air-cooled flat-six engine, 190 kW (250 hp)

Performance

- Maximum speed: 315 km/h (196 mph, 170 kn) at sea level
- Cruise speed: 270 km/h (170 mph, 150 kn) (econ cruise)
- Stall speed: 98 km/h (61 mph, 53 kn)
- Never exceed speed: 348 km/h (216 mph, 188 kn)
- Range: 1,550 km (960 mi, 840 nmi) at 270 km/h (170 mph; 150 kn)
- Service ceiling: 6,500 m (21,300 ft)
- Rate of climb: 6.48 m/s (1,275 ft/min)
- Takeoff distance to 15 m (50 ft): 255 m (837 ft)
- Landing distance from 15 m (50 ft): 345 m (1,132 ft)
