= Soaring (magazine) =

Magazine of the Soaring Society of America

SOARING is a magazine published monthly as a membership benefit of the Soaring Society of America. It was first published in 1937. The headquarters is in Hobbs, New Mexico. The magazine's article topics include safety issues and accounts of individual gliding accomplishments.
