= Schreder Airmate HP-8 =

American glider

HP-8
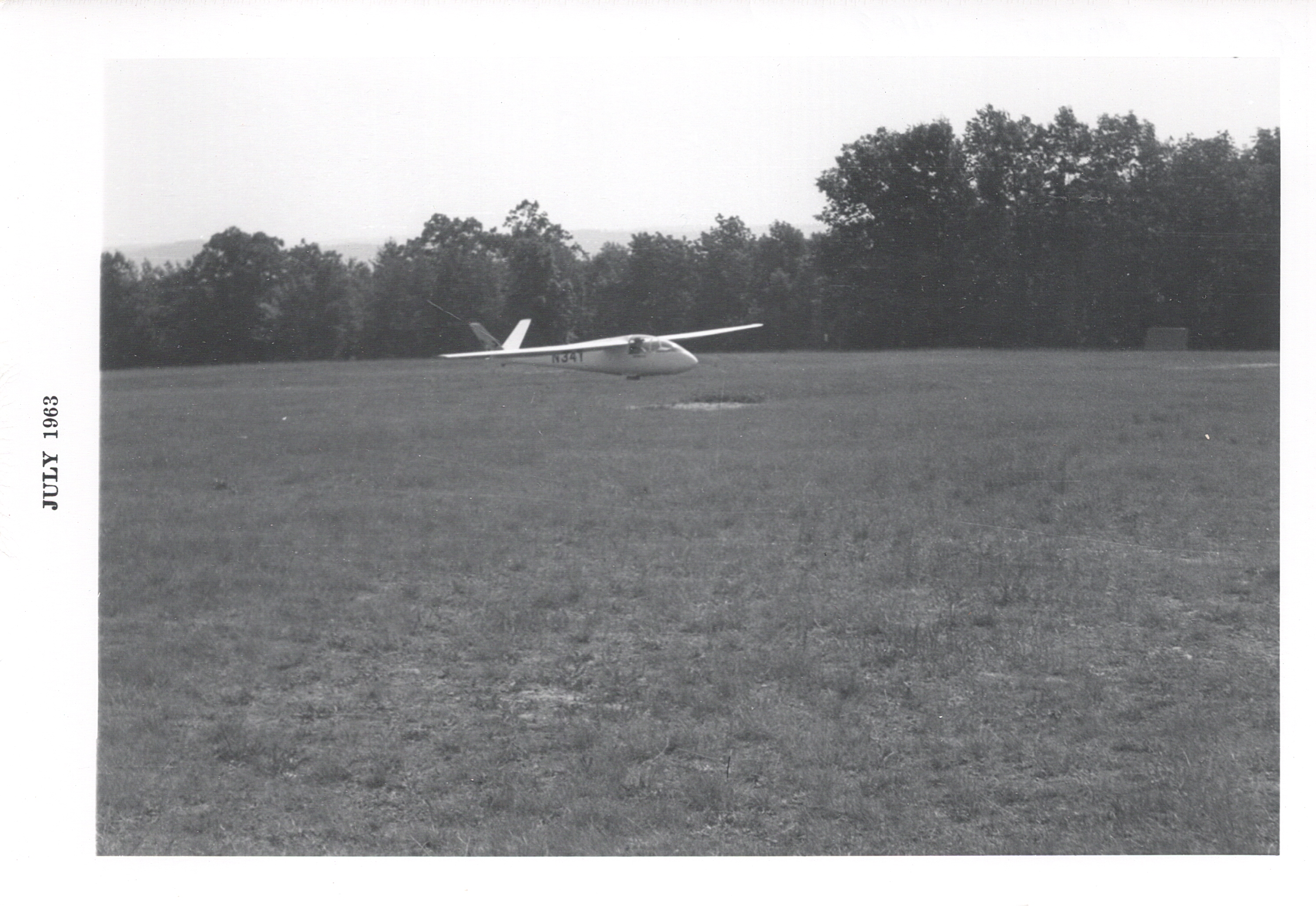
- George B. Moffat, Jr. lands his HP-8 sailplane at Harris Hill, NY in July, 1963 at the 30th US National Soaring Championships.

General information
- Type: Glider
- National origin: United States
- Designer: Richard Schreder
- Status: sole example in the National Soaring Museum
- Number built: One

History
- Manufactured: 1958
- Introduction date: 1958
- First flight: 1958
- Developed from: Schreder HP-7

The Schreder Airmate HP-8 is an American, high-wing single seat glider that was designed by Richard Schreder after the loss of the HP-7 in 1957.

Airmate was the name of Schreder's design company.

== Design and development ==
The HP-8 was designed as a result of the lessons learned in flying the HP-7 in the 1957 US Nationals. The HP-7 was destroyed in an aero-towing accident shortly after the Nationals and Schreder decided to improve on the earlier design with the HP-8. As in all of Schreder's designs, the HP stands for "high performance".

The HP-8 is an all-metal design with a very high aspect ratio wing of 24:1, that incorporates a NACA 65 (3)-618 airfoil. The wing is of only 110 square feet (10 m^{2}) in area and this gives a high wing loading of 7.53 lbs/sq ft (36.8 kg/m^{2}), allowing a high glide ratio at a high speed.

== Operational history ==
The HP-8 was entered by Schreder in the 1958 US Nationals and placed first. Schreder set records with the aircraft in all three speed categories in 1959 and also flew it to first place in the 1960 US Nationals.

The sole example built was then sold to George B. Moffat, Jr. who raised the speed records that Schreder had set in the aircraft. The HP-8 was subsequently purchased by Fred Hefty and John Elizalde and donated to the National Soaring Museum.

== Aircraft on display ==
- National Soaring Museum - 1. Currently listed as "under restoration"

== Specifications (HP-8) ==
Data from The World's Sailplanes:Die Segelflugzeuge der Welt:Les Planeurs du Monde Volume II

General characteristics

- Crew: one
- Length: 20 ft 10 in (6.36 m)
- Wingspan: 51 ft 3 in (15.65 m)
- Wing area: 110.3 sq ft (10.25 m^{2})
- Aspect ratio: 23.8:1
- Airfoil: NACA 65_{3}618
- Empty weight: 571 lb (259 kg)
- Gross weight: 851 lb (386 kg)

Performance

- Never exceed speed: 135 mph (218 km/h, 118 kn)
- Rough air speed max: 120.5 mph (194 km/h; 105 kn)
- Aerotow speed: 120.5 mph (194 km/h; 105 kn)
- Winch launch speed: 75 mph (121 km/h; 65 kn)
- Terminal velocity: with full airbrakes 125.5 mph (202 km/h; 109 kn)
- g limits: 12
- Maximum glide ratio: 36:1 at 55 mph (89 km/h; 48 kn)
- Rate of sink: 126 ft/min (0.64 m/s) at 50 mph (80 km/h; 43 kn)
- Wing loading: 7.53 lb/sq ft (37.6 kg/m^{2})

== See also ==
Related lists

- List of gliders
