= Schreder HP-18 =

American glider

HP-18
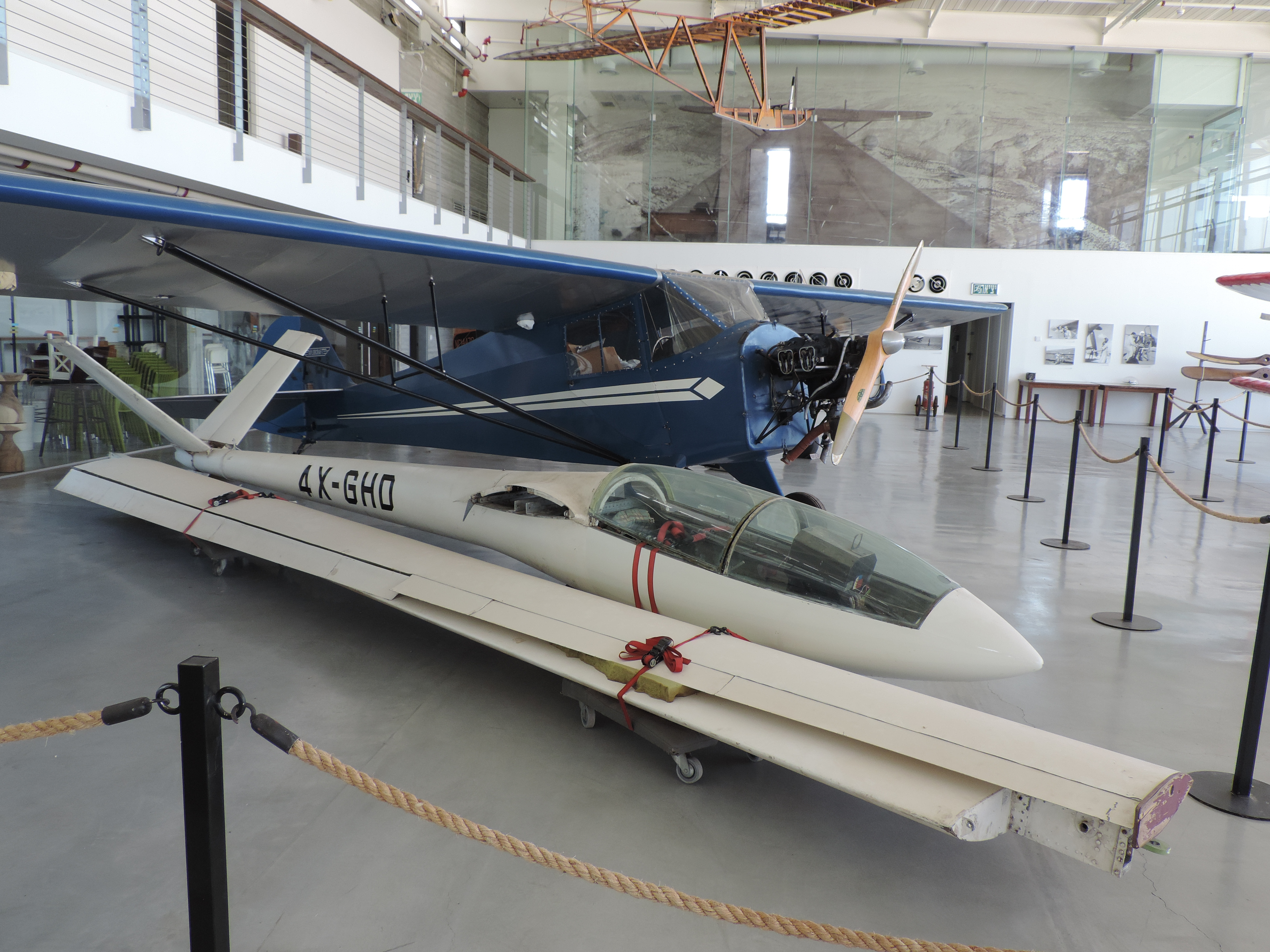
- An HP-18 dis-assembled prior to display at the Paradive Flight Gallery in Habonim

General information
- Type: Club (formerly 15 metre) class Sailplane
- Manufacturer: Homebuilt
- Designer: Richard Schreder
- Number built: 180 kits sold

The HP-18 is a Richard Schreder-designed metal Racing Class sailplane that was offered as a kit for homebuilding during the 1970s and 1980s.

== Design and development ==
The HP-18 is a flapped (15-meter) sailplane featuring a V-tail and 90-degree flaps for glidepath control. The fuselage is composed of a prefabricated composite forward fuselage and a semi-monocoque aft fuselage, and features steeply reclined seating and a side-stick controller although modifications using a conventional stick have been made.

Major features:

- Very low cockpit with reclining seating position
- Sidestick (changed to conventional stick by some homebuilders)
- Two-piece canopy (changed to single piece forward opening by some homebuilders)
- V-tail that folds upwards for easy storage
- Wing structure composed of spars with caps pre-machined from solid aluminium plate and aluminium wing skins bonded to closely spaced foam ribs
- Fiberglass fuselage pod, wing tip skids and tail fairings
- Aluminium tail cone
- Winglets added by some homebuilders
- Water ballast carried inside the hollow aluminium wing spars
- Typical Schreder trailing edge flaps/airbrakes partially interconnected with the ailerons

== Variants ==
As most homebuilts, the HP-18 has been constructed with many variations in detail. Perhaps the most significant version is the Super HP-18 developed by Canadians Ed Hollestelle and Udo Rumpf, which features a modified wing airfoil, winglets, a front-hinged canopy, conventional control stick and higher ballast capacity.

== Aircraft on display ==
- EAA Airventure Museum, Oshkosh, Wisconsin
- National Soaring Museum, Elmira, New York
- US Southwest Soaring Museum, Moriarty, New Mexico

== Specifications ==

General characteristics

- Crew: One pilot
- Length: 23 ft 2.4 in (7.07 m)
- Wingspan: 49 ft 2 in (15.00 m)
- Wing area: 113 sq ft (10.5 m^{2})
- Aspect ratio: 21.4
- Empty weight: 470 lb (213 kg)
- Gross weight: 970 lb (446 kg)

Performance

- Maximum speed: 150 mph (240 km/h, 130 kn)
- Maximum glide ratio: 38
- Rate of sink: 126 ft/min (0.60 m/s)
