= Richard Schreder =

- Born: 25 September 1915; Tecumseh, Michigan, U.S.
- Died: 2 August 2002 (aged 86); Bryan, Ohio, U.S.
- Occupation: Aircraft Engineer
- Spouse(s): Doris Elizabeth Clayton, Angelike Schreder
- Children: Richard Tabb Schreder, Douglas Lee Schreder; Carol Ann Schreder, Karen Schreder
- Awards: Lilienthal Gliding Medal (1959)

Richard E. Schreder (25 September 1915 – 2 August 2002) was an American naval aviator and sailplane developer, responsible for design and development of the HP/RS-series kit sailplanes marketed from 1962 until about 1982. Schreder also founded and ran Airmate, a successful drafting supplies company.

== Early life ==
At age 9 Schreder built his first airplane, a biplane hang glider that he built from plans found in a Popular Mechanics magazine. At 19 he built his first powered airplane, a single-seater powered by a Henderson Motorcycle engine.

After receiving a BS in Mechanical Engineering from the University of Toledo in 1938, Schreder joined the United States Navy as a Naval Aviation Cadet.

While in the Navy, Schreder was awarded the Distinguished Flying Cross for the sinking of the German submarine U-158 off Bermuda on 30 June 1942 while commanding a Martin PBM Mariner. Schreder's airmanship and marksmanship were such that he achieved a direct hit on the deck of the submarine with a depth charge. Schreder and his crew were initially disappointed when the depth charge did not explode on impact, and that it merely lodged itself into the teak planking of the deck. However, they continued to circle the site after the U-boat submerged and observed that the charge detonated after the sub carried it down to its pre-set trigger depth. He served in the navy until 1948, rising to the rank of commander.

After leaving the Navy, Schreder founded a successful drafting supplies business in Toledo, Ohio, and later moved it to Bryan, Ohio. His fascination with flight continued unabated while nurturing this business, and he continued to experiment with small aircraft when he could. His next design, an all-metal low-wing single-seater called the Airmate 5, won the Experimental Aircraft Association's best workmanship award in 1954. A high-wing four-seater with a V-tail soon followed, but was abandoned before completion when Schreder tried soaring and was immediately hooked.

Schreder immediately bought a Bowlus Baby Albatross, and later a Schweizer SGS 1-23. The 1-23 was damaged on Schreder's first flight in it when it was drawn into a thunderstorm and pelted with golfball-sized hailstones. After a week of hasty repairs, Schreder flew this ship to a second-place finish in the 1955 National Championships in Grand Prairie, Texas.

In 1956, Schreder built the HP-7 and flew it to a fourth-place finish in that year's US National Championship contest. The HP-7 was quickly followed by the HP-8, in which Schreder flew to victory in the 1958 US Nationals in Bishop, California. Schreder also used his HP-8 to establish speed records over 100, 200, and 300 km courses.

== Successful designs ==
After the HP-9, Schreder went on to develop the HP-10, his first attempt at developing a glider specifically for kit manufacture and construction by sailplane homebuilders. This project was handed off to Heliosoar, a company founded by Stephen DuPont to manufacture sailplane kits.

Schreder immediately started on the HP-11, completing the prototype in time to fly it to a third-place finish in the 1963 World Gliding Championships in Junín, Argentina. Upon returning to the States, Schreder refined the design slightly, added retractable landing gear, and offered it in kit form as the HP-11A.

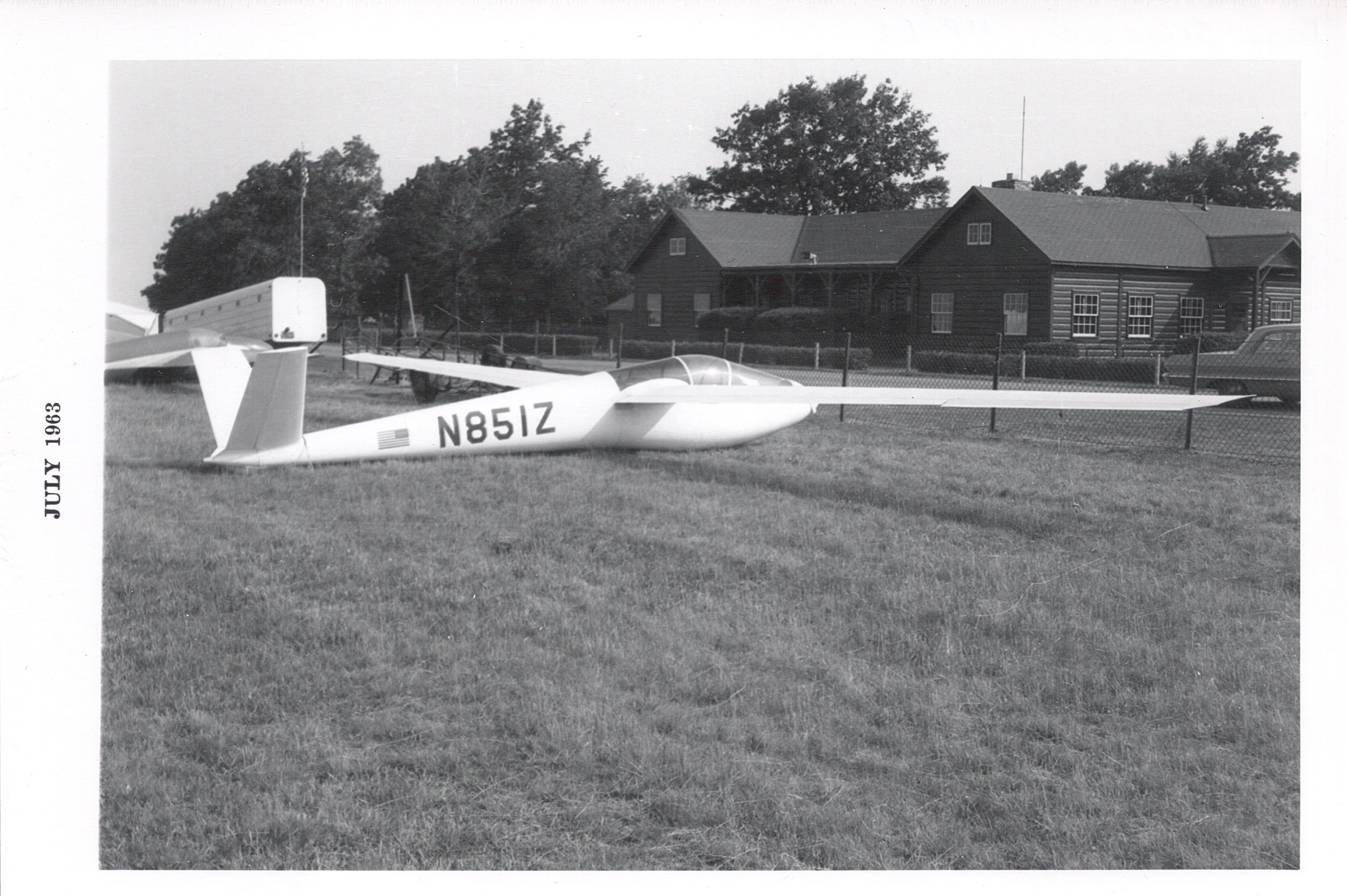
Dick Schreder's HP-11 at the 1963 US Soaring Championships at Harris Hill, Elmira, NY.

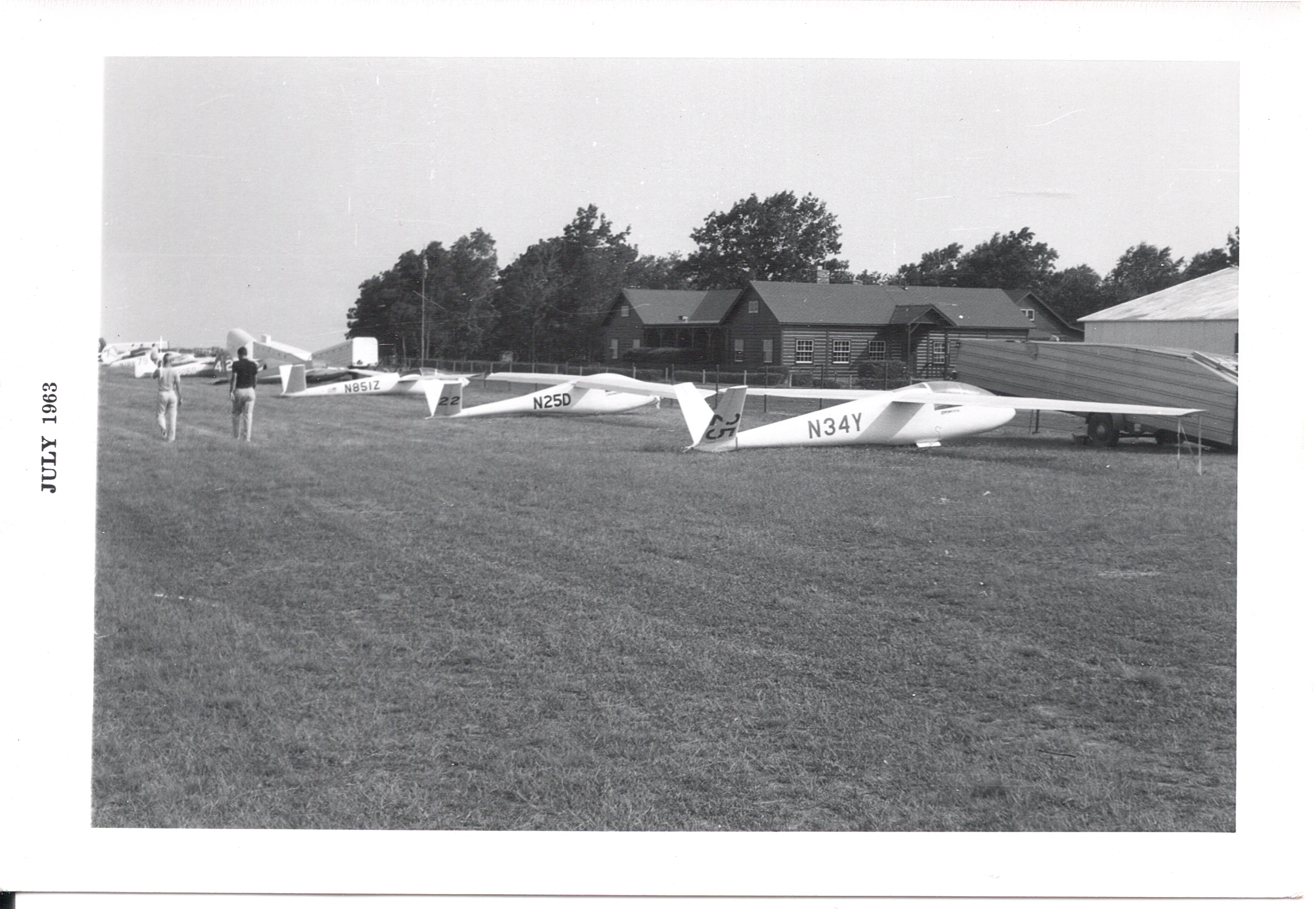
Right to left: HP-8, HP-10, HP-11. 1963 Harris Hill, NY. (Ben Greene, black shirt, left.)

Over the next few years, Schreder leapfrogged through the HP-series by successively developing new wings and then new fuselages for his glider designs. During this time Schreder also formalized his glider kit business, incorporating under the name Bryan Aircraft, Inc.

In 1966 Schreder flew his new HP-14 to victory in the US National Championships in Reno, Nevada, and created strong demand for HP-14 kits. This was his third national championship, having also won in 1958 and 1960.

Schreder's next design, the HP-15, was somewhat disappointing. Its high-aspect-ratio wing gave it good glider performance at high speed, but yielded too high a sink rate while at thermalling speed.

Building new wings for the HP-15 fuselage produced the HP-16. These new 15-meter wings were Schreder's first large foray into an innovative construction method featuring closely spaced PVC foam ribs (usually on 4" centers) bonded to an aluminum wing spar, to which was bonded a thin aluminum skin. The closely spaced ribs, combined with similarly-spaced foam interstitials, resulted in a cellular structure that yields great strength and stiffness with low weight. The HP-16 wing spars were made in inboard and outboard sections, each 12 feet (3.66 m) long, and each machined to an I-beam cross-section from billets of solid 7075-T6 aluminum and then spliced together to yield a 7.5m wing panel spar. The machining of these aluminum I beams would have been cost-prohibitive under normal circumstances, but was accomplished as something of a personal challenge by Schreder's friend John Mazur at his shop in Long Island, New York.

Following the HP-16, Schreder set to work on the RS-15, which combined the HP-16 wings and a new pod-and-boom fuselage. This ship was the only Schreder sailplane design to be named outside the HP nomenclature. The RS stood for Richard Schreder, and the 15 for its fifteen meters of span.

With his following design, the HP-17, Schreder developed a new, more cost-effective method for making wing spars. These spars featured a rectangular box section consisting of machined C-channels for the upper and lower caps, joined by shear web panels riveted to the flanges of the spar cap channels. These channels were again manufactured by Mazur, and were carefully made so that the floor of the channel tapers in thickness from 3/8" at the root to 1/16" at the tip.

It is not known whether the HP-17 actually flew, but the wing spars that Schreder developed for it found good use on Schreder's next and most popular kit sailplane, the HP-18.

First flown in 1974, the HP-18 was available in kit form in 1975, and in 1976 was featured in a series of six articles in Soaring Magazine that described every detail of its construction. In the spirit of the Popular Mechanics article from which Schreder built his first glider at age 9, the Soaring articles reproduced the HP-18 plans and assembly instructions in sufficient detail for a resourcful and mechanically-inclined individual to build the aircraft almost from scratch. However, most builders found it easier to purchase the HP-18 kit and its full-size plans from Bryan Aircraft.

Through the 1970s, homebuilt sailplanes including Schreder's kits fell somewhat into decline with the rise in performance and popularity of imported European composite sailplanes. Although the HP-18 was his most popular offering, it was also the last of Schreder's kit sailplanes. After the HP-18, Schreder tried his hand at manufacturing carbon-fiber composite wing spars, and abandoned it as too troublesome after making the one set, which was used by Henry Preiss to complete the one-off HP-19.

Schreder's HP-20 combined the HP-19 fuselage with an innovative new wing spar consisting of leaves of aluminum laminated and bonded together under pressure. The HP-21 was intended to be a variable-geometry self-launching sailplane based on the RS-15 fuselage and featuring retractable sailcloth wing extensions along the inboard trailing edges of its constant-chord wing, but was abandoned before completion. The HP-22 was to be a 2-seat amphibious sailplane, again self-launching, but was abandoned after the wings and most of the fuselage hull were completed.

== Later years ==
In the period following the HP-18's heyday, Schreder also spent a great deal of time attempting to develop a lightweight jet engine for small aircraft. Schreder envisioned such a powerplant as being ideal for self-launching sailplanes. His first attempts featured pulsejet engines with their bodies contained within the blades of a propeller, and exhausting through nozzles deflected 90 degrees so as to cause the propeller to spin. Though some success was attained, Schreder found difficulty in containing the internal pressures so as to prevent the engine bodies from reverting to round cross-section. Also, these engines were quite loud and not very fuel-efficient.

After 28 years in the job, Schreder retired as manager of Williams County Airport in 1992.

Schreder died in 2002 from complications of kidney failure.

== See also ==
- Homebuilt aircraft
