= Schweizer SGS 1-21 =

SGS 1-21

General information
- Type: Open-class sailplane
- National origin: United States
- Manufacturer: Schweizer Aircraft Corporation
- Designer: Ernest Schweizer
- Number built: 2

History
- First flight: 1947

The Schweizer SGS 1-21 is a United States single-seat, mid-wing, Open Class glider built by Schweizer Aircraft of Elmira, New York.

The 1-21 was a clean-sheet design intended to fill the role of high performance competition sailplane. It was designed by Ernest Schweizer and first announced in the September–October 1946 issue of the Soaring Society of America's Soaring magazine.

== Design and development ==
Following World War II soaring in the United States was dominated by surplus two-place gliders that had been used as trainers by the military, such as the TG-1, TG-2 and TG-3.

By the end of the war there were only about 400 gliders in the US. Of these only about a dozen were high performance competition sailplanes and half of these were pre-war designs. Schweizer Aircraft realized that if the US was to progress in the sport of soaring, that domestic mass-produced, high performance sailplanes would be needed.

The 1-21 was designed to be the high performance sailplane of choice in the post war era. While design had been completed in the summer of 1946, Schweizer had not built a prototype, hoping to get sufficient orders to make it worthwhile.

Two orders were received as a result of the publicity in Soaring. One was from Dick Comey and the other from David Stacy, both members of the Harvard Glider Club. The company decided that these two orders were sufficient to proceed with production. The 1-21's price was set at USD2750.

The 1-21 was of all-metal construction and incorporated some innovative features, including:

- Water ballast (266 lbs, 121 kg) in two wing tanks
- High aspect ratio wing of 15.75
- Two spoilers on the top of each wing and one underneath

The 1-21 design was never certified and both aircraft are experimental aircraft in the "racing, exhibition" class.

The SGS 1-21 was intended to be produced in much larger numbers than the two examples that were completed. A combination of factors prevented this, despite its initial successes. The aircraft was introduced just as the forecast post-war aviation boom failed to materialize. The 1-21's introductory price of USD2750 was too high for the market.

The Schweizers felt that there was good demand for an aircraft in the performance range of the 1-21, but at a lower cost. As a result, the 1-21 was redesigned and simplified. The resulting aircraft was of equal performance and could be sold for USD2000. This new aircraft was designated the Schweizer SGS 1-23 and went on to become a great success with 93 examples having been produced. The 1-23 remained in production until 1967.

== Operational history ==
The first 1-21 flew in early 1947 and was delivered to Dick Comey who flew it in the US Nationals that year, winning the competition.

The second 1-21 was donated to the Soaring Society of America by David Stacy in the summer of 1957. Stacy's request was that the 1-21 be auctioned off to raise funds to hire a new executive secretary for the association. The aircraft went to the highest bidder, Robert Lee Moore of Richland, Washington.

Dick Comey used the first 1–21 to enter the 1947 US Nationals. The event was a gruelling 17-day competition, with 14 contest days declared. All tasks were "open" with most pilots choosing "free distance" flights to gain the most points. These resulted in long end-of-day retrieve drives to get the sailplanes, resulting in late-night returns to base and early departures the next day again. Comey used the performance advantage of the 1-21, his own persistence, plus his dedicated crew of Bill Frutchy and Schweizer Aircraft employee Don Quigley, who was crewing on his vacation time, to win the lengthy contest.

Comey was subsequently hired by the SSA as their new general manager and did not compete in the 1948 Nationals. The aircraft was flown in the 1957 Nationals by Stan Smith, who won the competition.

Smith also used the aircraft to compete in the World Gliding Championships in Madrid, Spain in 1952.

The first 1-21 was also used by Comey in 1947 to set the US national distance record of 300 miles (480 km).

The second 1-21 was flown by Robert Lee Moore in the US Nationals on several occasions, as well as completing his Diamond badge in the aircraft.

In May 2008 both 1-21s were privately owned and still being flown:

- Serial number 1 – N91856
- Serial number 2 – N91861

== Specifications ==
Data from Jane's All the World's Aircraft 1948

General characteristics

- Crew: One
- Capacity: 266 lb (121 kg) water ballast
- Length: 22 ft 1 in (6.73 m)
- Wingspan: 51 ft 0 in (15.54 m)
- Height: 5 ft 7 in (1.70 m)
- Wing area: 165 sq ft (15.3 m^{2})
- Aspect ratio: 15.75
- Empty weight: 470 lb (213 kg)
- Gross weight: 990 lb (449 kg)

Performance

- Rate of sink: 138 ft/min (0.70 m/s)

== See also ==
Related lists

- List of gliders
