= Schweizer SGS 2-25 =

SGS 2-25
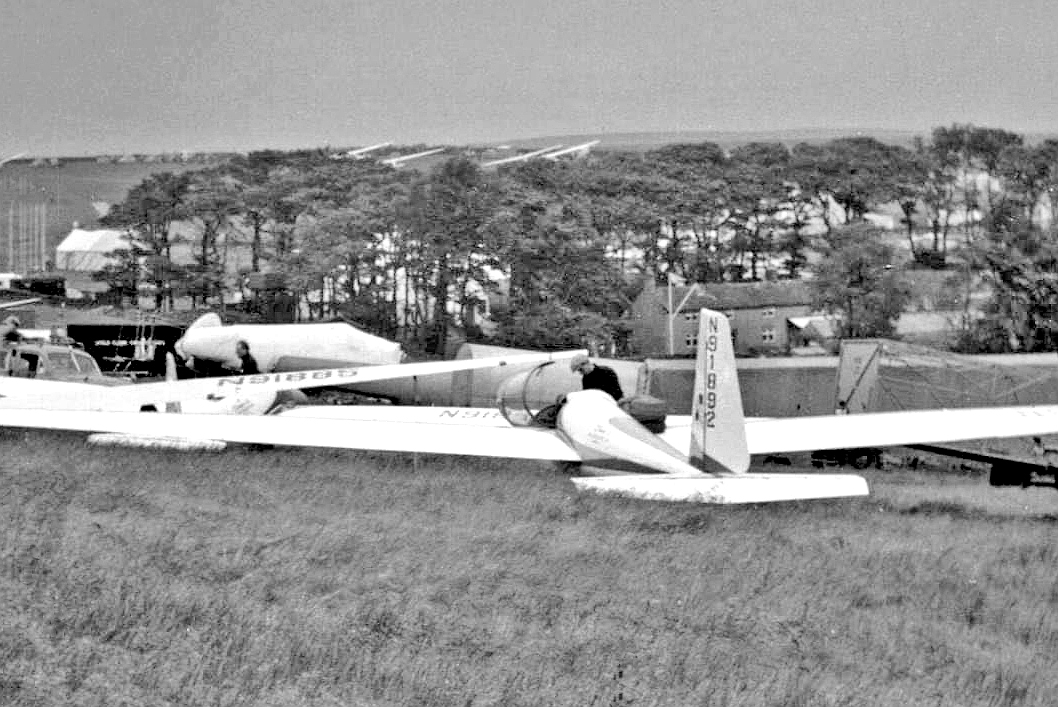
- The sole SGS 2-25 at Great Hucklow, Derbyshire, England during the 1954 World Gliding Championships

General information
- Type: Open-class sailplane
- National origin: United States
- Manufacturer: Schweizer Aircraft Corporation
- Designer: Ernest Schweizer
- Number built: 1

History
- First flight: 1954

The Schweizer SGS 2-25 is a United States two-seat, mid-wing, two-place competition glider built by Schweizer Aircraft of Elmira, New York.

The 2-25 was purpose designed to compete in the 1954 World Gliding Championships held in Great Hucklow, United Kingdom and was also flown in the World Championships held in 1956. There was insufficient market demand to produce the aircraft and so only one example was completed.

== Background ==
In 1954, for the first time at a World Soaring Championships, there was a class for two-place gliders. Each nation was permitted to enter two single-place gliders and one two-place.

Schweizer Aircraft supplied all the gliders for the US team: the sole Schweizer SGS 1-23E was purpose built for Paul MacCready, a Schweizer SGS 1-23D for Paul A Schweizer and the SGS 2-25 to be flown by Stan Smith and Bob Kidder. The small fleet of aircraft were all sent to the UK by ship from Montreal, bound for Liverpool.

== Development ==
The 2-25 was a new project, a high performance two-place sailplane. Schweizer had hoped to demonstrate the glider at the world competition and then manufacture additional copies for sale.

Schweizer constructed the 2-25 over the winter of 1953-54 and had it ready to fly in the spring of 1954.

The aircraft was of all-metal construction and was the largest glider that the company had built at that time. The 2-25 has a 60-foot (18.29 m) wingspan and a gross weight of 1450 lbs (657 kg). It has triple spoilers, with two on the top and one on the bottom of each wing.

Due to the lack of orders for the design it was never certified and the sole example was flown in the "experimental" category, registered as N91892.

== Competition and operations ==
=== 1954 World Championships ===
Stan Smith and Bob Kidder flew the SGS 2-25 in the World Soaring Championships at the Derbyshire and Lancashire Gliding Club in Great Hucklow, United Kingdom held between July 20-August 4, 1954 and finished third out of a field of nine two-place sailplanes.

The competition was fraught with difficulties. While the US sent a full team to compete, including a manager/meteorologist and assistant manager, fund-raising for the team was not successful and most of the team members had to pay their own way to Great Britain to compete. The contest featured the worst weather recorded in over fifty years. The contest was held over 14 days, but only four days were flyable contest days, due to the rain and low cloud. Before the contest started, the competition pilots were flown over the routes in a light aircraft to gain familiarity. The ceiling and visibility were so poor that the four pilots on board got repeatedly lost on the flight.

The contest opened with two good flying days, followed by a week of rain. By the end of the second contest day, Kidder and Smith were in second place. The third contest day saw them complete the day's best flight. Unfortunately the flight was invalid as not enough other contestants finished the task to validate it.

While landing at the end of the third day, Kidder and Smith put the 2-25 into a small English field and it was damaged. The SGS 2-25 could not be stopped within the confines of the field and it collided with a heavy wooden fence at the edge of the field. A heavy fence crossbeam ended up on top of the 2-25's canopy as the sailplane slid under the fence. The fence itself did not break the canopy, but the canopy could not be opened, leaving the crew trapped in the glider. The pilots had to enlist the aid of a farmer to remove the fence beam and extract them from the aircraft.

Although slightly damaged, the 2-25 was eventually removed from the field and loaded on its trailer. When the towing vehicle had to stop for gasoline the 2-25's fin and rudder were damaged on a low-hanging petrol-filling station canopy over the pumps. This all guaranteed that the 2-25 would not fly in the contest again and it missed the final flyable day of the competition.

=== 1955 The Jetstream Project ===
The SGS 2-25 was repaired at Schweizer Aircraft and put to work as part of the Jetstream Project. This was a joint USAF Cambridge Research Center and UCLA Department of Meteorology research project to gain a better understanding of Lee waves and was flown in the Sierra Nevada mountains of California.

The 2-25 proved very useful on the project and good data were gathered from many days of wave flying, including four days where flights over 40,000 feet were made. Pressure-jump waves were studied as part of the 1955 project.

=== 1956 World Championships ===
The 1956 Worlds were held in Saint-Yan, France and saw the SGS 2-25 flown in the two-place category, by Kemp Trager and Gene Miller. The team of Miller and Trager finished fourth in that contest, without damage to the 2-25.

=== USAF use ===
The 2-25 was later sold to George Arents Jr, who, after flying it for some years, donated it to the gliding program at the United States Air Force Academy. The 2-25 served there for many years under the designation of TG-1A. This was a new series of USAF designations and the 2-25 should not be confused with the Frankfort TG-1 of Second World War vintage. The Frankfort TG-1 had the same designation under an earlier military designation system. While in USAF service the 2-25 was registered as N225AF.

=== Museum ===
The 2-25 was donated to the National Soaring Museum and is now on permanent loan to the National Museum of the United States Air Force at Wright Patterson Air Force Base in Dayton, Ohio.

Federal Aviation Administration records show the SGS 2-25 as "destroyed" in May 2000.

== Specifications ==
Data from Jane's All The World's Aircraft 1961–62

General characteristics

- Crew: one
- Capacity: one passenger
- Length: 28 ft 0 in (8.53 m)
- Wingspan: 60 ft 0 in (18.29 m)
- Wing area: 231 sq ft (21.5 m^{2})
- Aspect ratio: 15.6:1
- Airfoil: NACA 43012A at root, NACA 23009 at tip
- Empty weight: 732 lb (332 kg)
- Gross weight: 1,118 lb (507 kg)

Performance

- Maximum speed: 134 mph (216 km/h, 116 kn)
- Maximum glide ratio: 30:1 at 46 mph (74 km/h; 40 kn)
- Rate of sink: 132 ft/min (0.67 m/s)

== See also ==
Related lists

- List of gliders
