= Schweizer SGS 1-24 =

Single-seat, mid-wing, Open Class competition glider

SGS 1-24
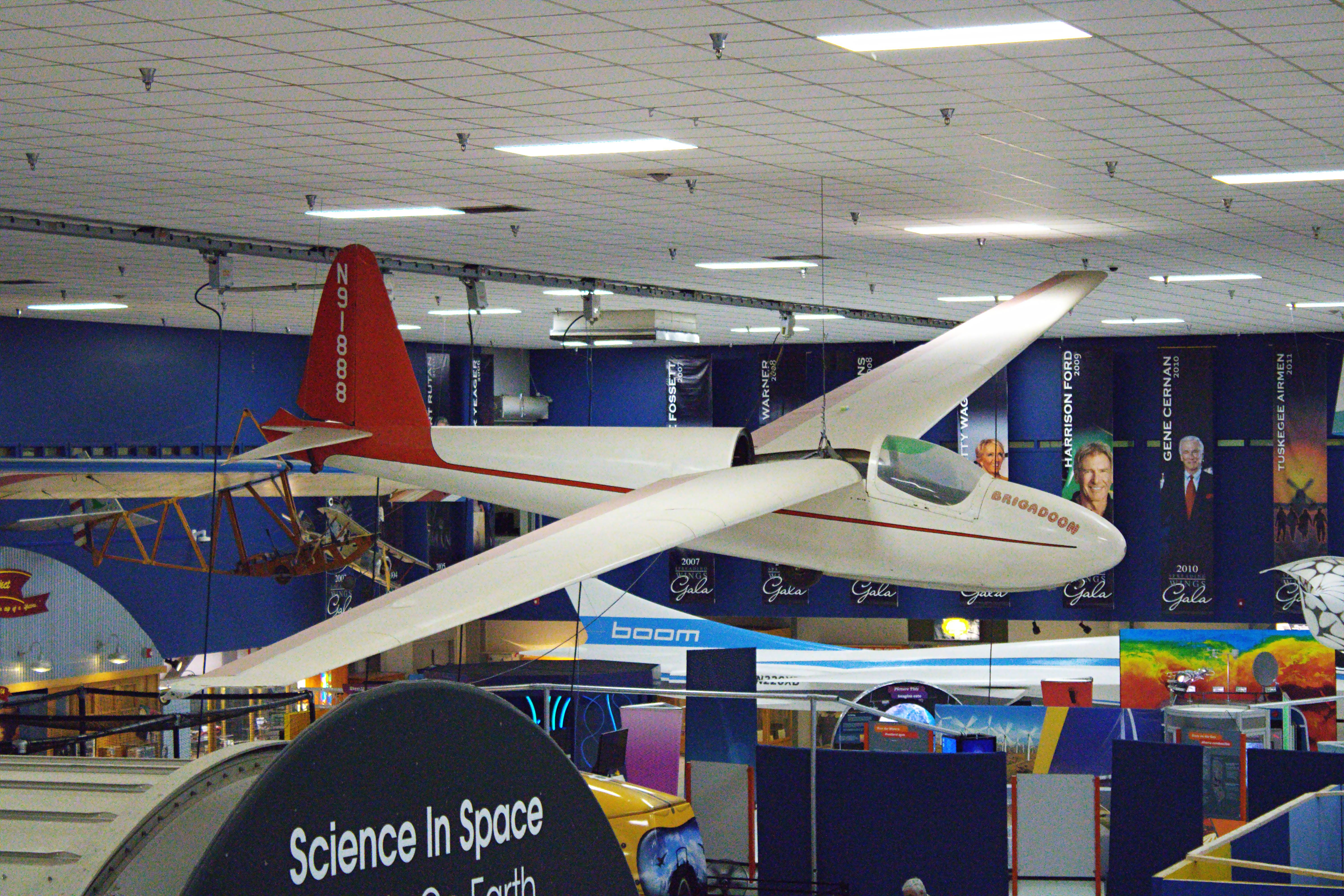
- Brigadoon at Wings Museum

General information
- Type: Open-class sailplane
- National origin: United States
- Manufacturer: Schweizer Aircraft Corporation
- Designer: Howard Burr and Ernest Schweizer
- Status: Currently at Wings Over the Rockies Air and Space Museum, on long-term loan from National Soaring Museum
- Number built: 1

History
- First flight: 1953
- Developed from: SGS 1-23

The Schweizer SGS 1-24, also referred to as the Schweizer-Burr SGS 1-24, is a United States single-seat, mid-wing, Open Class competition glider built by Howard Burr and Schweizer Aircraft of Elmira, New York.

The 1-24 is a development of the Schweizer SGS 1-23 that utilized a 1-23 fuselage and a newly constructed set of 55 feet (17 m) span, high aspect ratio wings.

The aircraft was constructed as a spare time project by Howie Burr and Ernest Schweizer to produce a competition sailplane. The aircraft first flew in 1953 and one example was completed.

== Design and development ==
The early 1950s were the heyday of the SGS 1-23 design. From the time of its introduction in 1948, the production sailplane had dominated soaring contests in the USA.

Schweizer Aircraft employee Howie Burr conceived of creating an improved version of the 1-23 by using the existing fuselage and building a set of 17.10:1 aspect ratio wings for the aircraft. The 55-foot (17 m) span wings gave the aircraft a 30:1 glide ratio and a low 2.0-foot-per-second (0.61 m/s) minimum sink speed. Those performance figures are identical to the 1-23D.

Burr finished the aircraft in his spare time, flying it first in early 1953. The 1-24 was ready for competition flying in time for the 1953 US Nationals, which were held at Harris Hill, New York.

The 1-24 design was never certified and the sole aircraft that was built is an experimental aircraft in the "racing, exhibition" class and registered as N91888.

The 1-24 is of all metal construction, including aluminum wings.

The design incorporated some innovative concepts in addition to the high aspect ratio wing. It had a shuttle weight that could be moved by cable through the length of the tail that allowed the glider to be trimmed anywhere between 50 mph (80 km/h) and 80 mph (130 km/h).

== Operational history ==
The 1-24 was given the name Brigadoon by Howie Burr, after the popular musical stage play and film of the same name.

Burr entered the 1-24 in the 1953 US Nationals and the Snowbird meet held at Harris Hill over Thanksgiving, 1955. In the Snowbird meet, Burr flew the 1-24 to second place against a field of 25 sailplanes.

The 1-24 was loaned to Paul A. Schweizer to compete in the 1957 US Nationals, which were held in Elmira, New York. Burr was unable to fly the 1-24 in that contest himself, as he was contest director. Paul Schweizer did not complete the competition as his father died during the contest and he withdrew.

In 1969, the 1-24 was sold to Carl Waters and moved to California. Burr later re-purchased the aircraft from Waters and carried out a complete restoration of it, including the original name "Brigadoon".

== Accidents ==
The 1-24 was substantially damaged on 25 May 1996 at landing at the Mountain Valley Airport, Tehachapi, California when it collided with two other parked gliders.

== Aircraft on display ==
The 1-24 was initially loaned to the National Soaring Museum, Elmira, New York and later title was transferred to the museum. It is currently on long-term loan at the Wings Over the Rockies Air and Space Museum. Denver, Colorado.

== Specifications ==
General characteristics

- Crew: One
- Wingspan: 55 ft 6 in (16.9 m)
- Wing area: 180 sq ft (14.8 m^{2})
- Aspect ratio: 17.10
- Airfoil: NACA 43012A, 23009
- Empty weight: 585 lb (265 kg)
- Gross weight: 785 lb (356 kg)

Performance

- Maximum glide ratio: 30 at 40 mph (80 km/h)
- Rate of sink: 120 ft/min (0.61 m/s)

== See also ==
Related lists

- List of gliders
