= Schweizer SGM 2-37 =

US touring motor glider, 1982

SGM 2-37
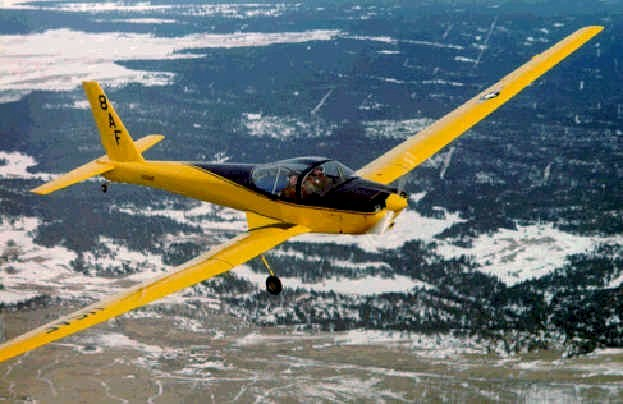
- USAFA TG-7A

General information
- Type: Motor glider
- National origin: United States
- Manufacturer: Schweizer Aircraft Corporation
- Designer: Leslie Schweizer
- Primary users: United States Air Force Academy United States Coast Guard
- Number built: 12

History
- Manufactured: 1982–1988
- Introduction date: 1982
- First flight: 1982
- Retired: USAF service: April 2003; Still in civil use
- Developed from: Schweizer SGS 1-36 Sprite and 2-32
- Developed into: Schweizer RU-38 Twin Condor

The Schweizer SGM 2-37 is a two-place, side-by-side, fixed gear, low wing motor glider.

A total of twelve were produced between 1982 and 1988, including nine for the United States Air Force Academy, which designated it the TG-7A. The TG-7A was retired from USAFA service in April 2003.

The basic airframe was later developed into the SA 2-37A and B covert surveillance aircraft.

== Development ==
Schweizer had flown a Schweizer SGU 1-19 as a motor glider in 1946 without putting the design into production. In 1958 the company carried out a design study of a powered aircraft using the wings and tail of the 1-26 designated as the Schweizer SA 1-30, but after some test flying and modification it was not put into production. A two-seat version of the 1-30, the Schweizer SA 2-31 was completed in 1960 but not put into production due to competition in the light aircraft market. Both the 1-30 and 2-31 were designed as regular light aircraft and no further motorgliders were built by the company until 1982.

The SGM 2-37 was designed at the request of the USAF for use at USAFA, in both the powered and glider trainer role.

To save both money and development time the aircraft used a number of existing aircraft components:

- Nose, cowling, and engine installation adapted from the Piper PA-38 Tomahawk
- Wings adapted from the Schweizer SGS 1-36 Sprite, including extensions to bring it from the Sprite's 46.2 feet (14.1 m) to 59.5 feet (18.1 m) and leading edge cuffs to improve stall characteristics
- Tail from the Schweizer SGS 2-32

The design was intended to be available as a civil aircraft as well as a military aircraft. The USAF version was delivered with a Lycoming O-235-L2C 4-cylinder aircraft engine of 112 hp (84 kW). The civil version offered the same engine or an option of a Lycoming O-320 of 150 hp (112 kW) or a Lycoming O-360 of 180 hp (134 kW).

The aircraft is of all-metal aluminum monocoque construction. The engine cowling is made from fiberglass and plastics are employed in some of the nonstructural components.

The 2-37 features a 27 cu ft (760 L) baggage compartment behind the side-by-side seating. The aircraft does not have flaps, but instead has top-and-bottom wing-mounted balanced divebrakes, similar to other Schweizer glider designs.

Performance includes a cruise speed of 114 mph while burning 4 US gal per hour with the O-235 engine. The 17.9 aspect ratio wing provides a glide ratio of 28:1 with the propeller feathered, and a minimum sink speed of 3.16 feet/sec (0.96 m/s). The USAF Technical Orders indicate a glide ratio of between 19.3:1 and 19.7:1.

The SGS 2-37 was marketed by the company as being suitable for the following roles:

- Sailplane trainer
- Powered aircraft trainer
- Glider towplane (with larger horsepower engine option)
- Private touring aircraft
- Surveillance
- Aerial Inspection

The 2-37 was later developed into the SA 3-38, known in military service as the Schweizer RU-38 Twin Condor.

=== Certification ===
The SGM 2-37 was certified by the Federal Aviation Administration under type certificate G1NE on 22 March 1983. The 2-37 type certificate is currently held by K & L Soaring of Cayuta, New York. K & L Soaring now provides all parts and support for the Schweizer line of sailplanes.

=== Reception ===
Soaring, the journal of the Soaring Society of America, described the SGM 2-37 as: "Very versatile, very promising, very expensive". The publication's review noted that the $70,000 base price did not include a feathering propeller, gyro instruments, wheel fairings, long range fuel tanks, or other optional extras.

== Operational history ==
Examples of the TG-7 were used by the US Army from 1985 on covert surveillance duties under the Grisly Hunter project. The two aircraft were then transferred to the US Coast Guard by mid 1989, were modified and were re-designated RG-8A. The aircraft were used on coastal patrols from the US Coast Guard base at Miami wearing a grey low visibility color scheme, as shown in the adjacent image taken in 1989.

There were nine aircraft still registered in the US in April 2008. Current owners include the Tuskegee Airmen National Historical Museum and designer Leslie E. Schweizer.

== Variants ==
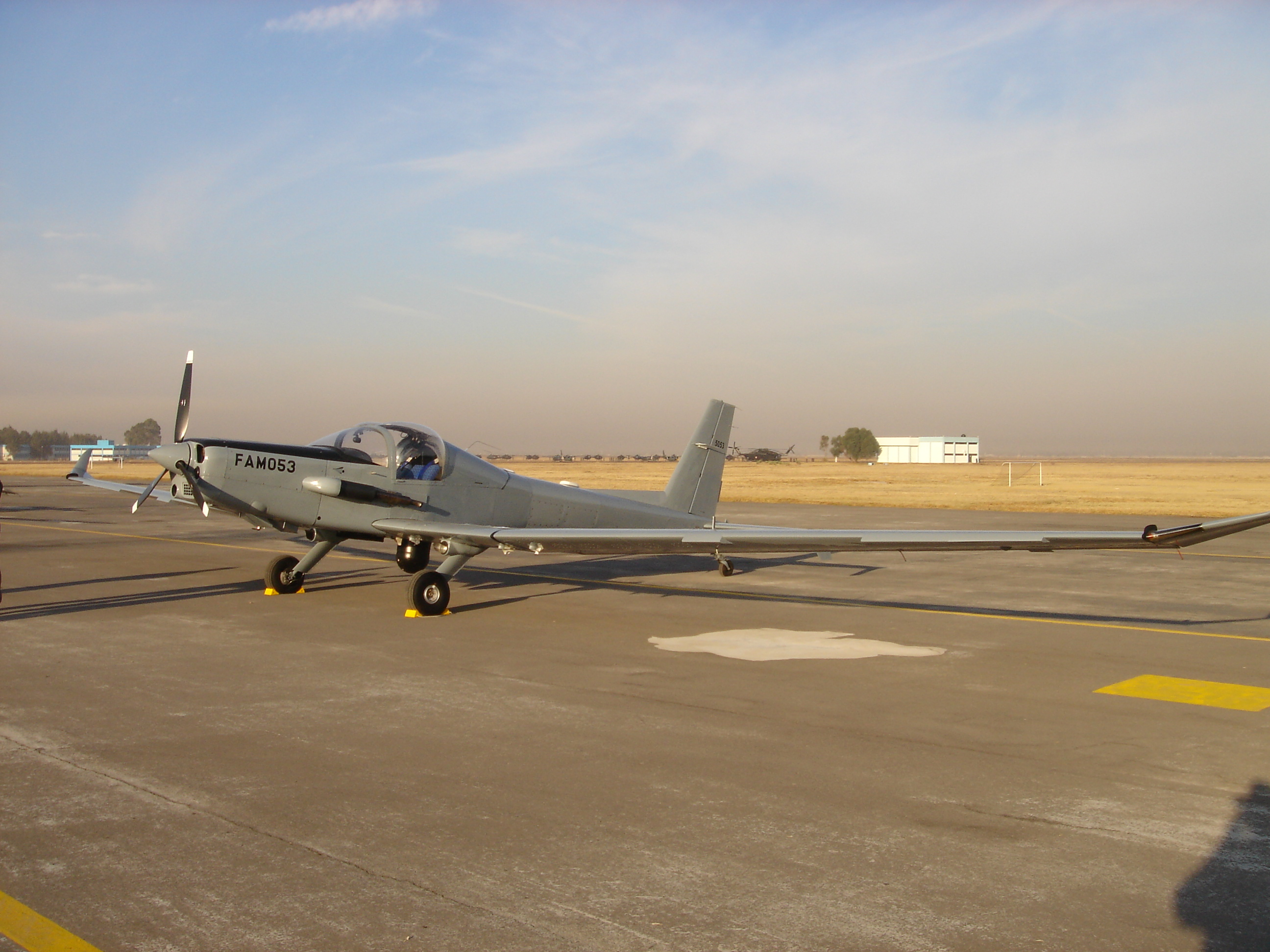
SA2-37B of the Aerial Surveillance Squadron, 3rd Air Group, Mexican Air Force at Santa Lucia Air Force Base

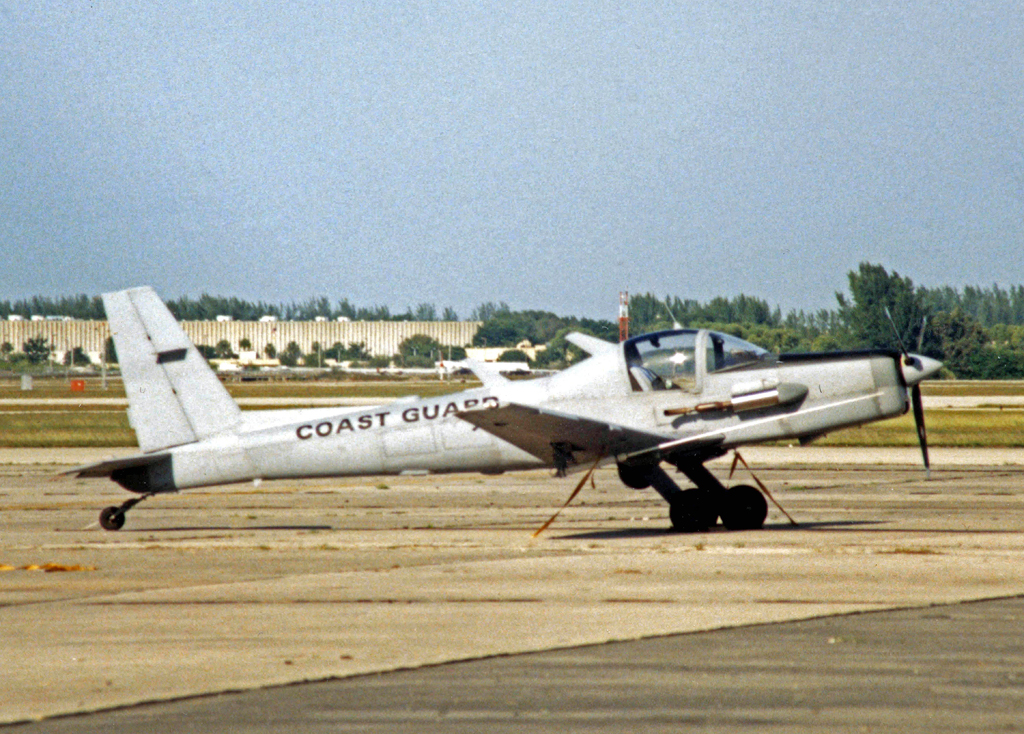
RG-8A surveillance aircraft of the US Coast Guard at Opa Locka, Miami, in 1989, wearing low visibility paintwork

SGM 2-37
Motor glider for USAF and civil use, 12 completed.
SA 2-37A
The SA 2-37A is a two-seat special-mission surveillance aircraft built for the Central Intelligence Agency and US Army and equipped with a Lycoming O-540-B powerplant of 235 hp (175 kW) and first flown in 1982. The US aircraft register records six SA-2-37As, including four belonging to Vantage Aircraft Leasing. All are in the experimental exhibition category.
SA 2-37B
The SA 2-37B is a development of the 2-37A equipped with a Lycoming TIO-540-AB1AD powerplant of 250 hp (186 kW). The aircraft is optimized for covert surveillance missions and carries FLIR and electronic sensors. It has a 500 lb (231 kg) sensor payload in a 70-cubic-foot (2,000 L) fuselage bay. With a fuel capacity of 99 US gallons (370 L) it can remain on station for up to 12 hours. Gross weight is 4300 lb (1950 kg). The US aircraft registry records four SA 2-37Bs, all owned by Schweizer Aircraft. All are in the experimental Research and Development category.
TG-7A
United States Air Force designation for the SGM 2-37.
RG-8A
In US Coast Guard service the SA 2-37 is designated RG-8A, indicating Glider, Reconnaissance.

== Operators ==
United States

- United States Air Force
- United States Army
- United States Coast Guard

Colombia

- Colombian Air Force

Mexico

- Mexican Air Force

== Specifications (SGM 2-37) ==
Data from Sailplane Directory, USAFA, Soaring magazine November 1983 & FAA Aircraft Type Certificate G1NE

General characteristics

- Crew: two in side-by-side seating
- Capacity: 650 lb (295 kg)
- Length: 27 ft 6 in (8.5 m)
- Wingspan: 59 ft 6 in (18.14 m)
- Height: 7 ft 8 in (2.4 m)
- Wing area: 195.7 sq ft (18.18 m^{2})
- Airfoil: Wortmann Fx 61–163
- Empty weight: 1,200 lb (544 kg)
- Gross weight: 1,850 lb (839 kg)
- Max takeoff weight: 1,850 lb (839 kg)
- Powerplant: 1 × Lycoming O-235-L2C aluminum fixed pitch, 112 hp (84 kW)

Performance

- Maximum speed: 135 mph (181 km/h, 117 kn)
- Cruise speed: 112 mph (181 km/h, 97 kn)
- Stall speed: 48 mph (78 km/h, 42 kn) with divebrakes closed
- Never exceed speed: 135 mph (219 km/h, 117 kn)
- Range: 230 mi (372 km, 200 nmi)
- Service ceiling: 14,000 ft (4,300 m)
- Wing loading: 9.45 lb/sq ft (46.15 kg/m^{2})
- Power/mass: 16.51 lb/hp (0.100 kW/kg)

== See also ==
Related development

- Schweizer SGS 1-36 Sprite
- Schweizer SGS 2-32
- Schweizer RU-38 Twin Condor

Aircraft of comparable role, configuration, and era

- Diamond HK36 Super Dimona
- Grob G 109
- Pipistrel Sinus
- Valentin Taifun

Related lists

- List of gliders
