= Schweizer SGS 1-26 =

United States One-Design, single-seat, mid-wing glider

SGS 1-26
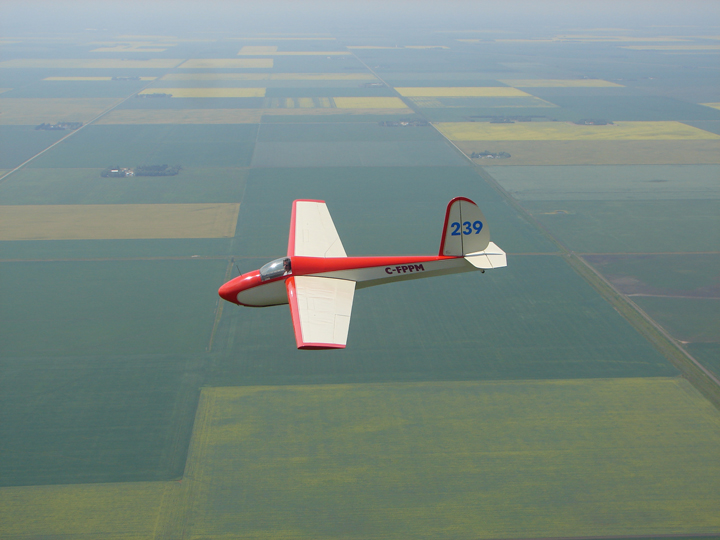
- SGS-1-26B

General information
- Type: 1-26 class sailplane
- National origin: United States
- Manufacturer: Schweizer Aircraft Corporation
- Designer: Ernest Schweizer
- Number built: 700

History
- First flight: 16 January 1954

The Schweizer SGS 1-26 is a United States One-Design, single-seat, mid-wing glider built by Schweizer Aircraft of Elmira, New York.

The SGS 1-26 enjoyed a very long production run from its first flight in 1954 until 1979, when production was ended. The 1-26 was replaced in production by the Schweizer SGS 1-36 Sprite. The 1-26 is the most numerous sailplane found in the US.

In October 1963 a special issue of Soaring magazine was dedicated to the 1-26. Harner Selvidge wrote:

"Much of the glamour of soaring lies in the realm of high performance, high aspect ratio open class sailplanes, but the backbone of the soaring movement in this country, and any other, lies in the local club operations. These are the weekend fliers who have fun around the airport, make some cross-country flights and enter local contests. For this sort of flying, the 1-26 is unexcelled."

== Design and development ==
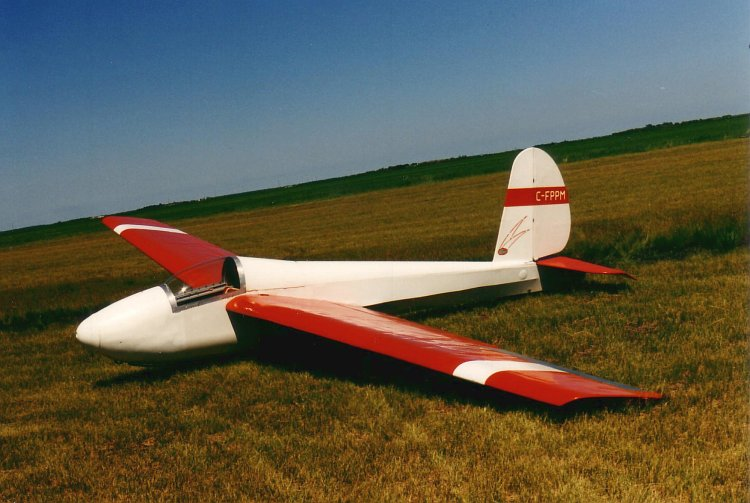
SGS 1-26B

Schweizer Aircraft originally proposed the idea of a simple, inexpensive, one-design class sailplane at the 1945 Motorless Flight Conference.

This concept was revived in 1954. At that time the Schweizer SGS 1-23 was the only sailplane in production in the United States and demand for it had dropped off, due to its high price. At the same time the number of people participating in soaring had increased and there was a clear market for a low cost sailplane.

Design goals for the new glider included:

- available as a kit
- small and light weight for ease of storage and construction
- rugged design with a focus on pilot protection
- launched by autotow, winch and aerotow
- enough performance for Gold distance flights (300 km)
- low minimum sink speed ability to soar in light conditions

Schweizer Aircraft felt that the best way to produce a low cost sailplane was with a new design that could be made available as a kit.

The resulting kit sailplane design had three main features:

- No critical parts would be fabricated by the builder to ensure reliability, minimize jigs and simplify construction.
- Assembly in six months, so it could be built over one winter.
- A complete kit, so the builder would not have to waste time sourcing his own parts.

Schweizer initially envisioned production to be restricted to kits, with the possibility of full production of completed aircraft if demand warranted.

Initial reception of the new model was very positive. A complete review of the aircraft was published in the March–April 1954 issue of the Soaring Society of America's Soaring Magazine. Sufficient orders were forthcoming that full production soon commenced.

The 1-26 received type certificate 1G10 on 14 December 1954. The type certificate is currently held by K & L Soaring of Cayuta, New York K & L Soaring now provides all parts and support for the Schweizer line of sailplanes.

=== One-Design competition ===
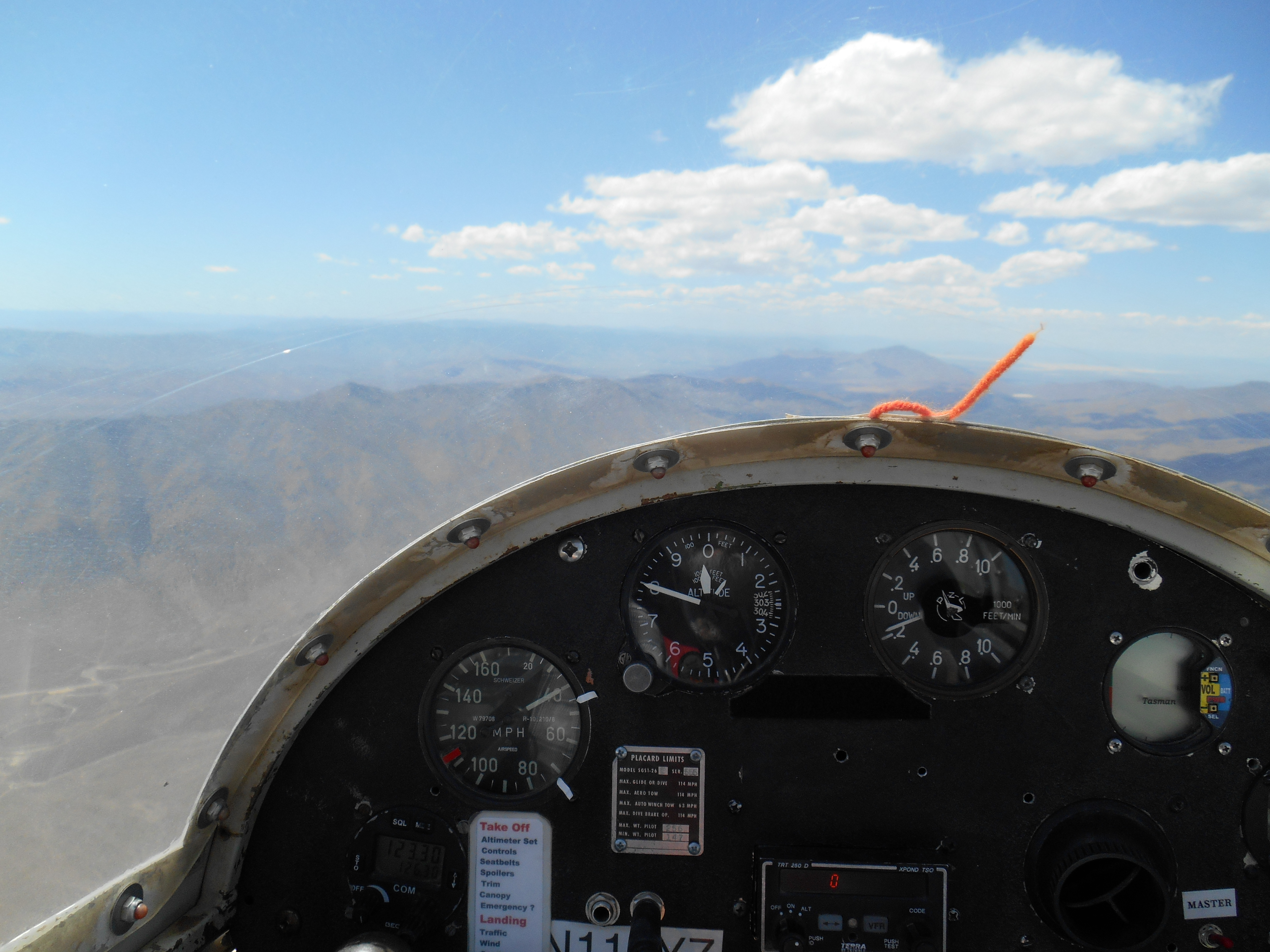
View from a 1-26, flying north of Reno, Nevada

Paul A Schweizer was a proponent of the One-Design concept and the 1-26 as the aircraft by which to establish a one-design class in the US. He wrote:

The true measure of pilot ability and experience is usually shown by his final standing in a contest. What could be more indicative of this when pilots are flying identical sailplanes with identical performance. One design competition is the sure test of soaring skill.

The design was a success as a one-design and became the most popular one-design class in the world.

The 1-26 design gained weight through the evolution of the models, as the gross weight increased from 575 lbs to 700 lbs. Performance testing showed that there is very little difference between the models and that the one-design concept has been maintained throughout the aircraft's production life.

== Operational history ==
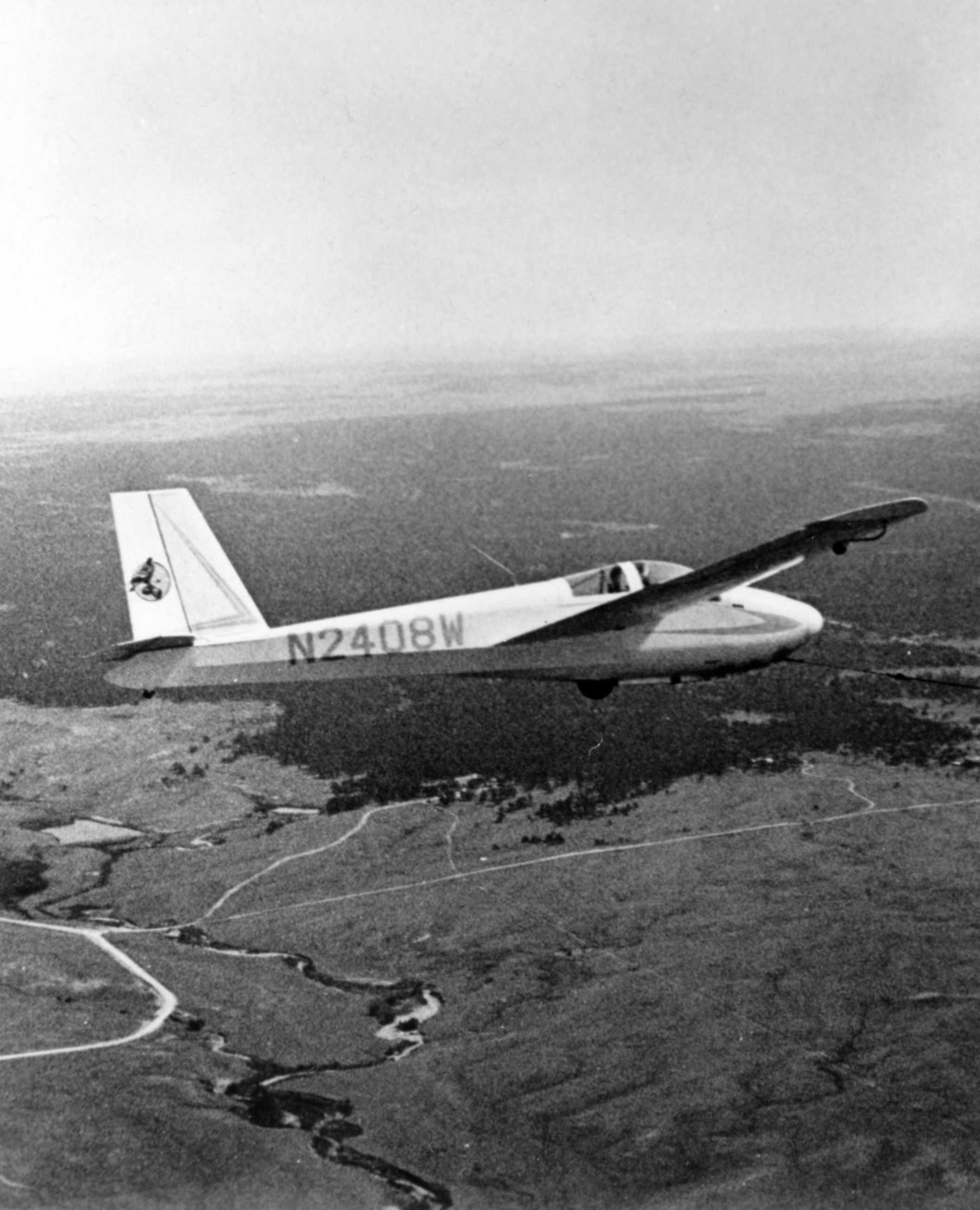
United States Air Force Academy 1-26B (TG-3A)

The 1-26 is used by many soaring clubs in the United States and is often the first single place glider that a student flies immediately after solo, often coming from a Schweizer 2-33 two-seat trainer.

As of November 2017 there were still 438 SGS 1-26s registered in the US and 17 in Canada.

The 1-26 was used by the United States Air Force Academy under the designation TG-3A, until it was replaced by the TG-10D Peregrine in October 2002.

Thirty 1-26s were supplied to Indonesia as part of a United States foreign aid package.

=== Records & badges ===
The 1-26 has been seen as a challenging aircraft to set records in and to achieve FAI soaring badges, given its low glide performance.

Rose Marie Licher set the US National Feminine distance record of 273.28 miles while flying a 1-26. Jean Arnold set the US National Feminine goal record of 96.4 miles in a 1-26.

US pilot Wally Scott flew a distance of 443.5 miles in a 1-26.

Among other US pilots Tom Knauff and Bill Creary earned all three of their diamond badges in 1-26s.

US pilot Daniel Sazhin completed a 1000 kilometer diploma flight in a 1-26E in 2016. He flew a total of 1034 kilometers (642.5 miles) in 11 hours and 6 minutes.

In 1969 a 1-26 Sweepstakes was organized by the 1-26 Association and sponsored by Schweizer Aircraft. The seven-month contest held across the US and Canada encouraged pilots to earn badges in the 1-26 to be eligible for prizes. These included 28 barographs as well as trophies. The contest resulted in many badges earned as well as three flights over 300 miles (486 km). Canadian Harold Eley earned all three Diamonds in a 1-26.

== Variants ==
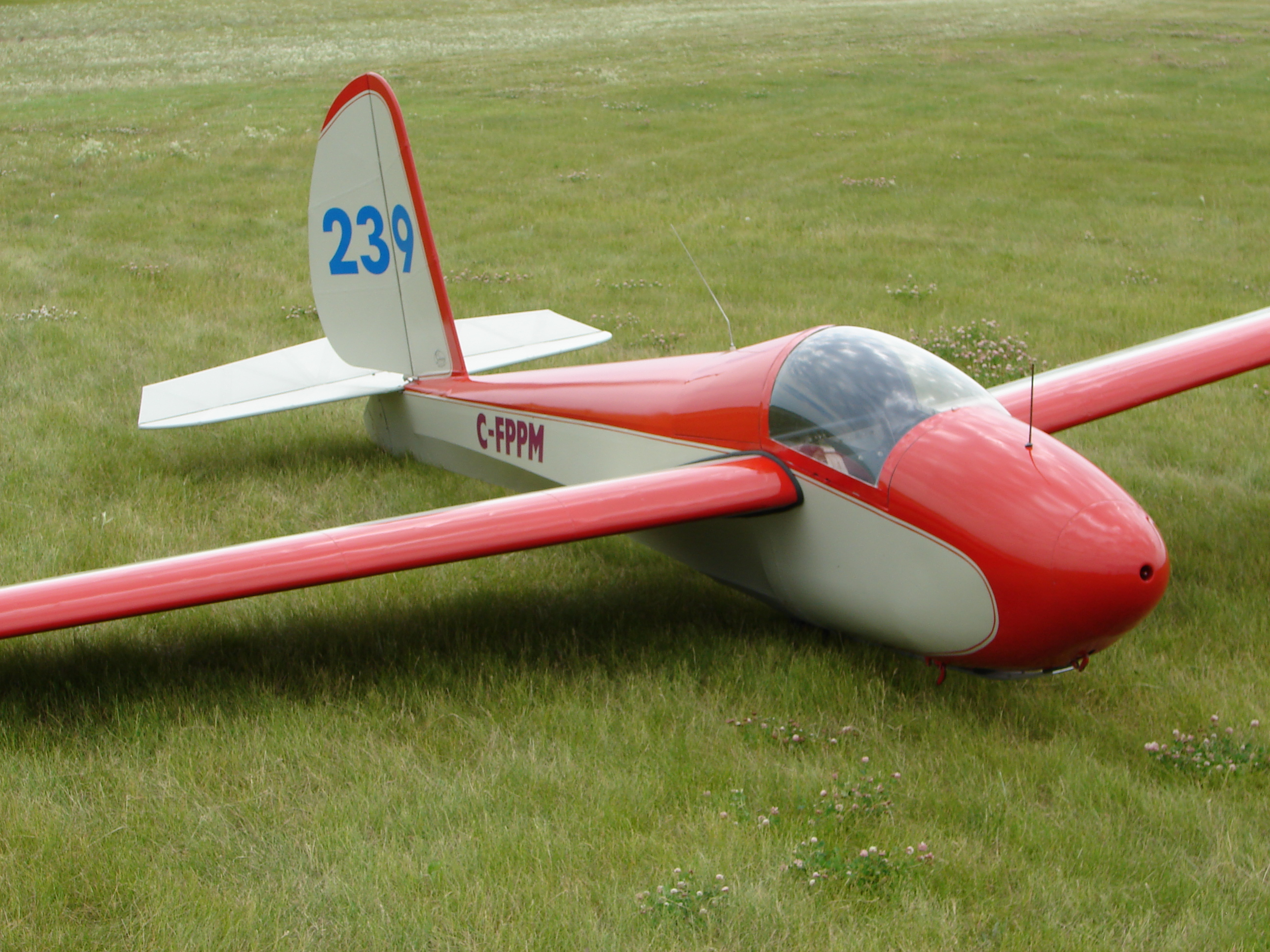
A restored SGS 1-26B

1-26
The original 1-26 model is also referred to as a "standard". It features a welded steel tube fuselage and aluminum framed wings, all covered in aircraft fabric.
Gross weight is 575 lbs. There were 22 "standards" completed.
1-26A
The 1-26A is a "standard" that was completed by the builder from a kit and licensed as a certified aircraft, instead of an amateur-built. There were 114 completed.
Like the "standard", the "A" also has a gross weight of 575 lbs.
1-26B
The "B" model was introduced in 1956 as a factory built aircraft. It improved on the "standard" by introducing metal-covered wings. This resulted in the empty weight increasing by 25 lbs. The gross weight was increased to 600 lbs to account for the loss of useful load.
Starting in 1965 the "B" was available with a swept tail to replace the rounded tail.
1-26C
The "C" is a kit-built "B" model. Like its factory built counterpart it also had a gross weight of 600lbs.
1-26D
The 1-26D was introduced in 1968 and incorporated some evolutionary improvements to make the aircraft simpler and easier to construct. These include a new monocoque nose forward of the main spar, top and bottom dive brakes to replace the top surface only spoilers of earlier models, new ailerons and a gross weight increased to 700 lbs.
The "D" model also introduced a one-piece canopy and a lower profile fuselage. The swept tail was standard on the "D" model. A total of 77 "D" models were produced.
1-26E
The "E" model was introduced in 1971.
The 1-26E incorporates a complete monocoque metal fuselage, entirely replacing the welded tube construction of the earlier models. It also has a revised fin assembly with new style attachments.
The "E" has a gross weight of 700 lbs. 213 were built.
1-30
The Schweizer SA 1-30 used the wings and tail surfaces from the 1-26 to produce a powered aircraft.

== Aircraft on display ==
- Arnot Mall – 1-26 serial number 001, registration N91889. The NSM also has SGS 1-26E serial number 700 in its display collection.
- US Southwest Soaring Museum – 1-26A

== Specifications (1-26E) ==
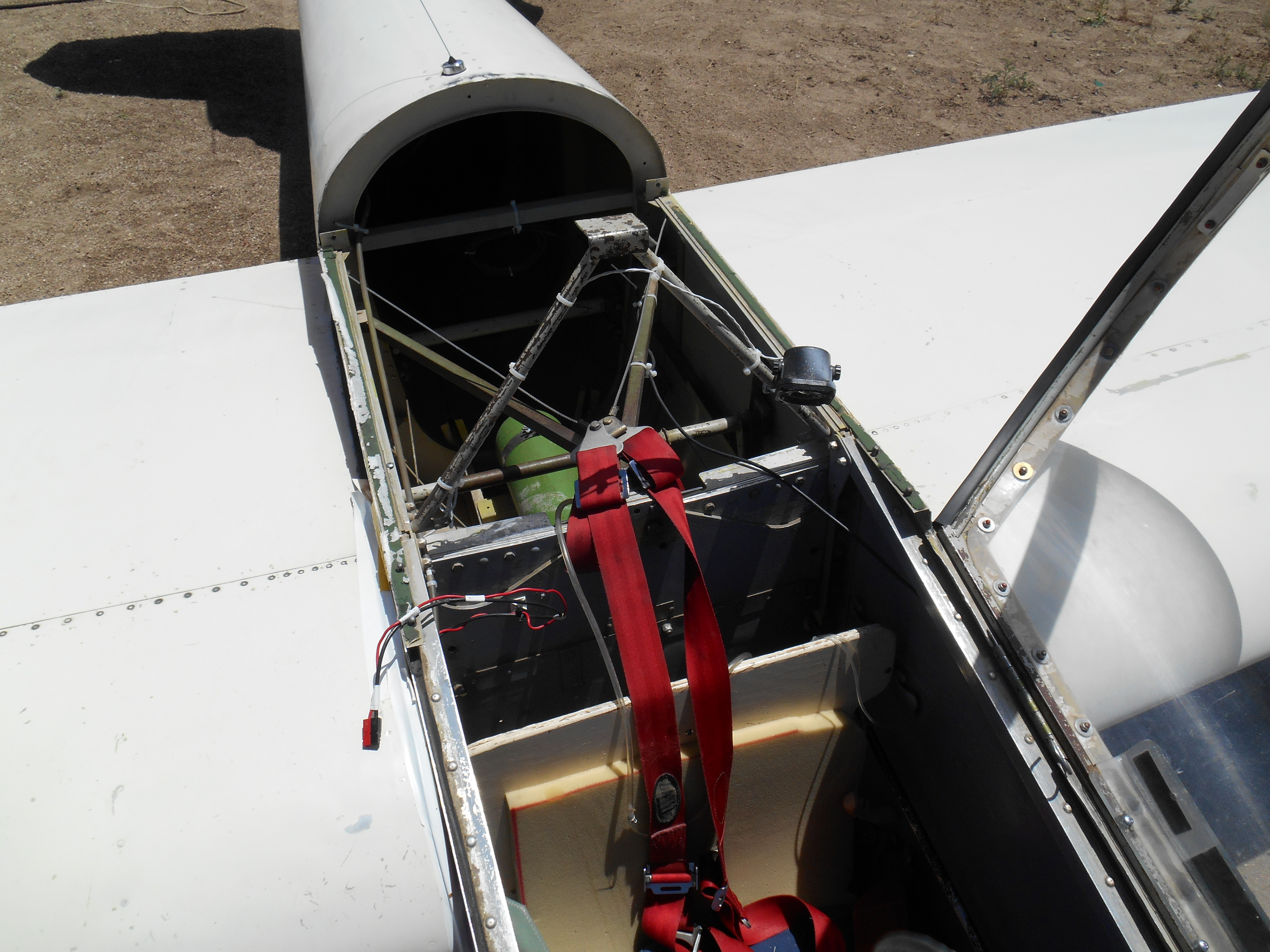
Internal structure of a 1-26, oxygen bottle in rear

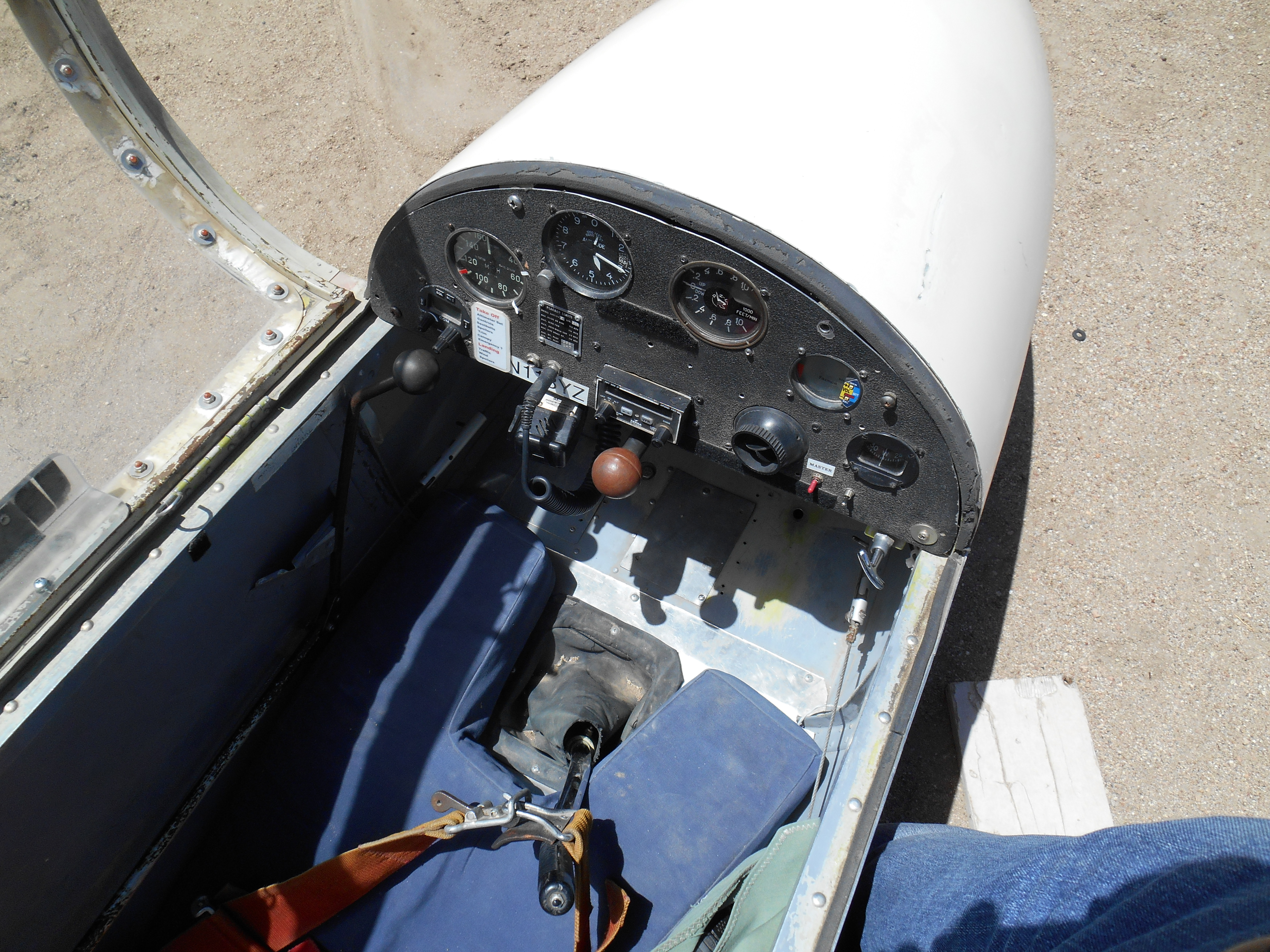
Pilot's controls and instruments in a typical 1-26

General characteristics

- Crew: One
- Length: 21 ft 6 in (6.55 m)
- Wingspan: 40 ft 0 in (12.2 m)
- Height: 7 ft 2 in (2.18 m)
- Wing area: 160 sq ft (14.9 m^{2})
- Aspect ratio: 10
- Airfoil: NACA 4301 2A
- Empty weight: 445 lb (202 kg)
- Gross weight: 700 lb (318 kg)

Performance

- Maximum speed: 114 mph (182 km/h, 99 kn)
- Maximum glide ratio: 23 at 53 mph (84 km/h)
- Rate of sink: 174 ft/min (0.88 m/s)

== See also ==
Related development

- Gehrlein Precursor – aircraft built from a 1-26 fuselage and 1-23 wings

Aircraft of comparable role, configuration, and era

- Haig Minibat
- Hall Cherokee II

Related lists

- List of gliders
