= Schweizer SGS 2-8 =

American two-seat, mid-wing, strut-braced, training glider

SGS 2-8
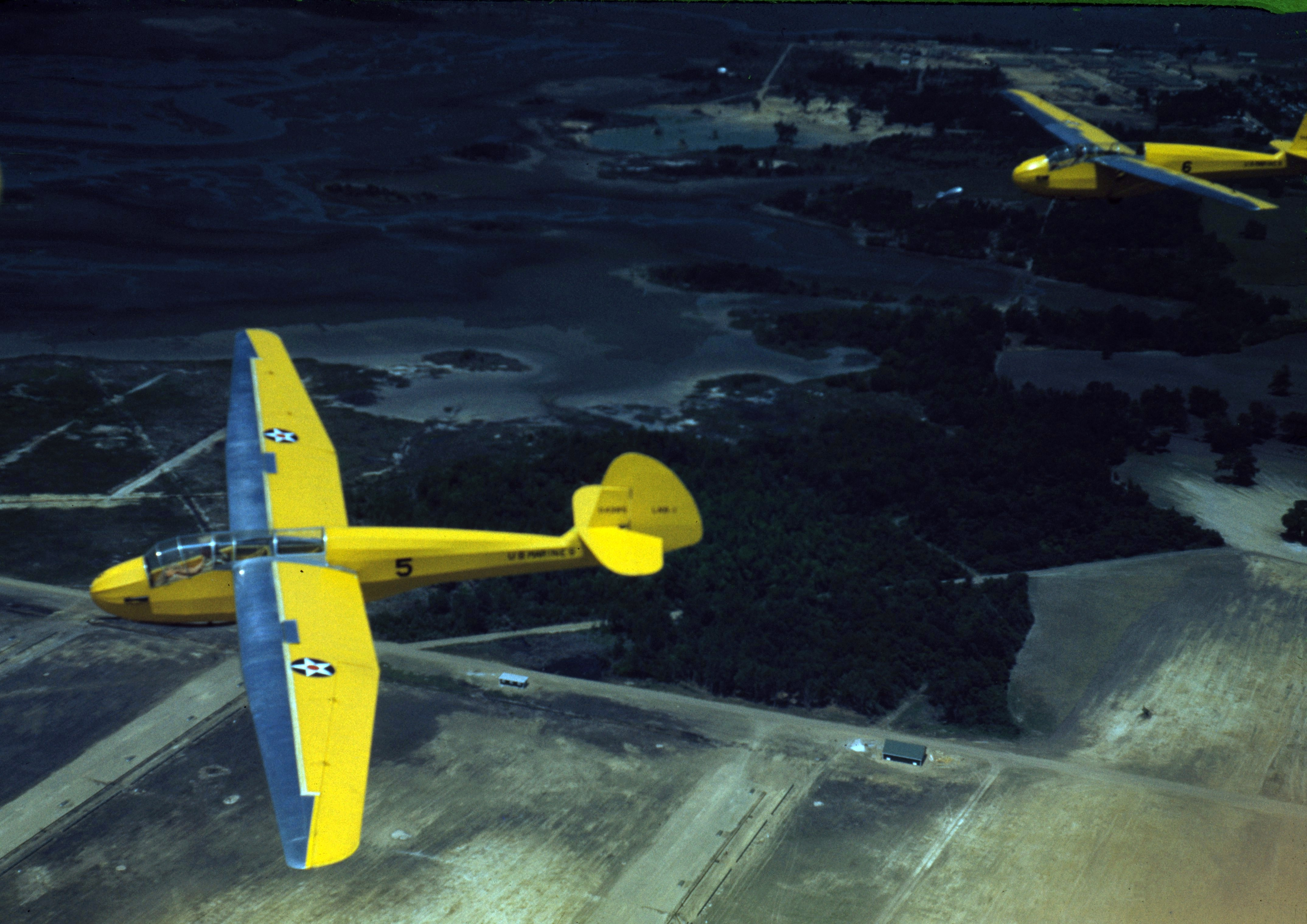
- US Marine Corps LNS-1s in 1942

General information
- Type: Open-class sailplane
- National origin: United States
- Manufacturer: Schweizer Aircraft Corporation
- Designer: Ernest and Paul A Schweizer
- Number built: 57

History
- First flight: June 1938

The Schweizer SGS 2-8 is an American two-seat, mid-wing, strut-braced, training glider built by Schweizer Aircraft of Elmira, New York.

The 2-8 was originally known simply as "The Schweizer Two-Place" when it first flew in June 1938. When World War II started, the 2-8 became a military trainer for the US Army, Navy and Marines and all existing aircraft were drafted into military service. After the war they were sold as surplus and quickly became sought after in civil soaring for their structural strength, lightness and their rugged all-metal design. The 2-8 became one of the most popular post war trainers in the United States.

== Design and development ==
During the 1920s and 1930s gliding was often self-taught or taught in single place sailplanes. An instructor would often coach the student using hand signals from the automobile towing the glider into the air. By the mid-1930s the benefits of having a two-place glider for training were beginning to be recognized by glider instructors.

A number of two-place designs were demonstrated in the United States, including the Gross Sky Ghost in 1932, the Funk two-place and the Bowlus-duPont two place, both of which first flew in 1933.

In late 1937 the Airhoppers Gliding Club of Long Island, New York approached the Schweizer brothers to see about the design of a Schweizer two-place glider specifically for training purposes.

The Schweizer Metal Aircraft Company built the 2-8 prototype over the winter of 1937-1938. The aircraft was completed and first flew in June 1938, in time to fly in the US National Soaring Championships.

The first dozen 2-8s delivered went to clubs and individuals and were not certified aircraft at that time. One 2-8 was ordered by the Soaring Society of America for use by their general manager, Henry Wightman, and was flown from the Washington DC area.

At the time of the sale to SSA, Bob McDowell, the attorney who notarized the bill of sale, indicated to the Schweizers that they should move their manufacturing operation out of their father's barn and relocate to the Elmira, New York area. The Schweizers received the suggestion positively as they needed more space to produce gliders, but they had no money with which to make the move. McDowell convinced Elmira Industries Inc, the local business development corporation, to provide space for the Schweizers on the second floor of the Elmira Knitting Mill Building in return for stock in the company. This resulted in the Schweizer Metal Aircraft Company becoming the Schweizer Aircraft Corporation, with a sale of shares to Elmira Industries, local businessmen and soaring pilots.

Orders for 2-8s came in from a group of Bell Aircraft employees, a youth group, a number of gliding schools, as well as several individuals.

The 2-8 received type certificate GTC 5 on 28 June 1940.

The type certificate is currently held by K & L Soaring of Cayuta, New York. K & L Soaring now provides all parts and support for the Schweizer line of sailplanes.

Manufactured aircraft are known as SGS 2-8s while those assembled from factory kits are designated as SGS 2-8A.

The 2-8 has a welded steel tube fuselage covered in aircraft fabric. The aluminum wings feature assembly with self-tapping PK screws and very few rivets.

== Operational history ==
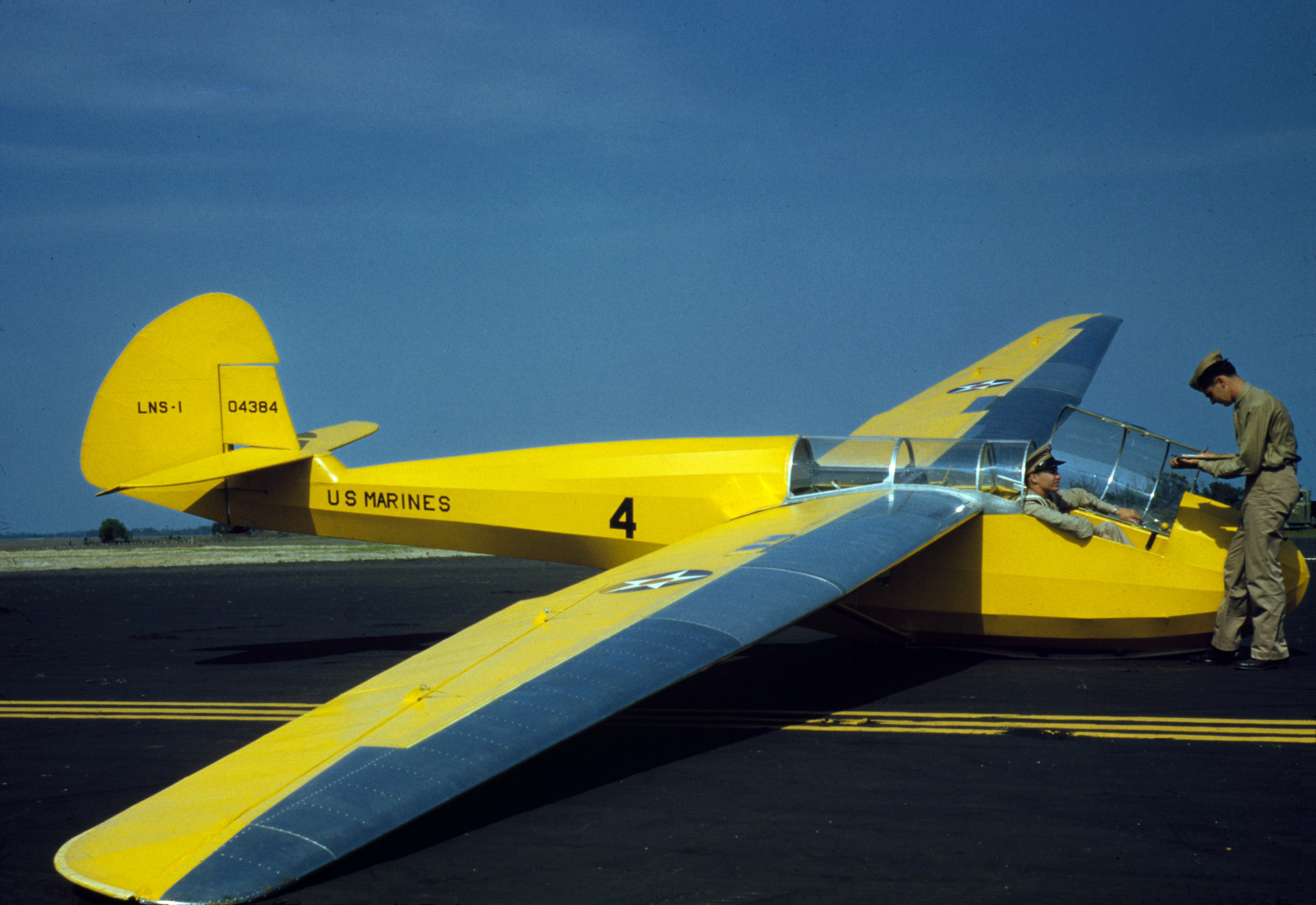
LNS-1 at Parris Island, 1942.

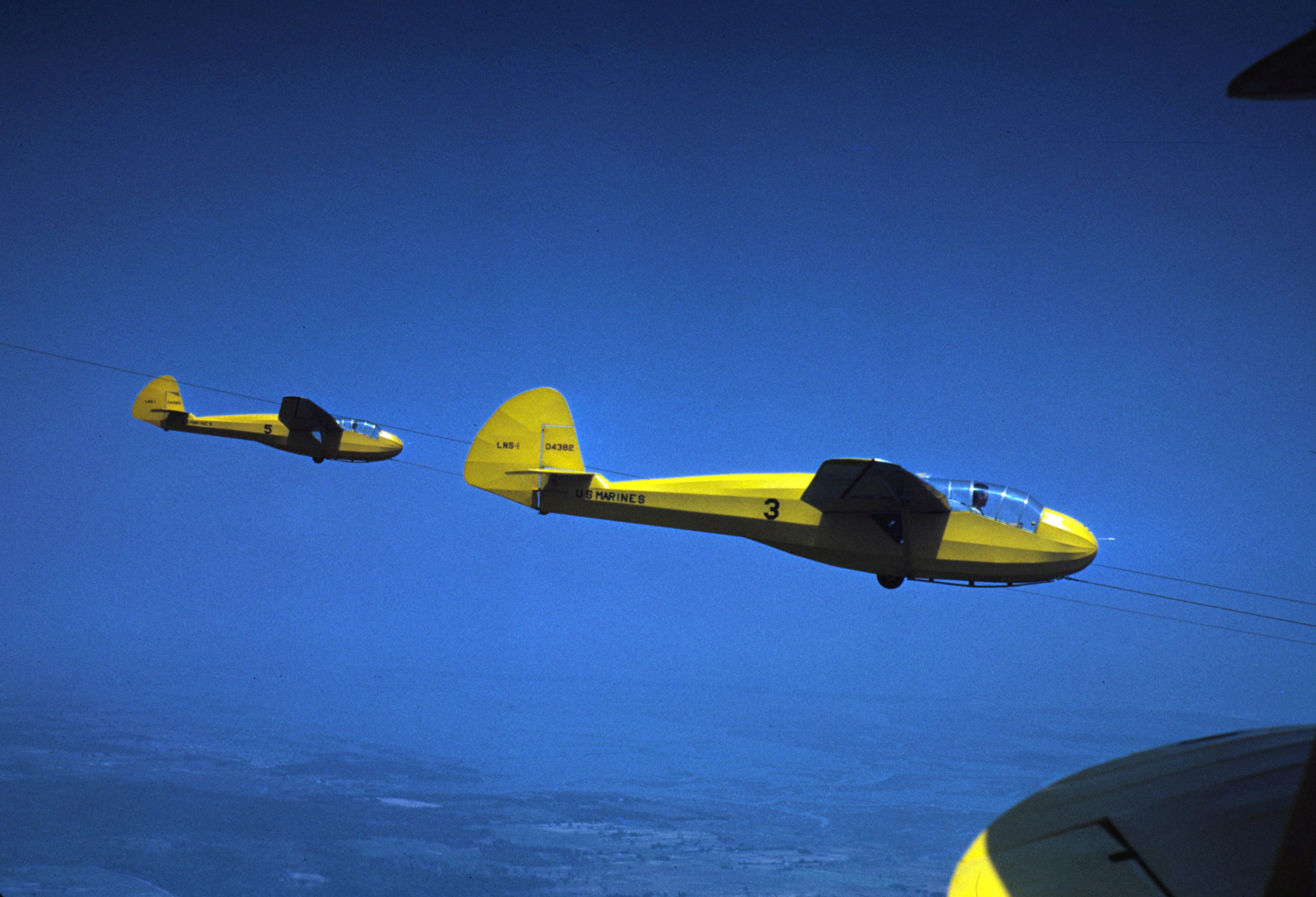
N3N Canary trainers were used to tow three LNS-1.

In April 1941 the Schweizers were contacted by the US Army Air Force (USAAF). The USAAF, impressed by the Luftwaffe's use of gliders to capture the Belgian fortress of Eben-Emael during the campaign of the previous summer, had decided to commence a glider pilot training program. The USAAF was in need of training gliders and the Schweizers offered the SGS 2-8 as the ideal aircraft for the role.

On 10 August 1941 the AAF issued a statement on the procurement of the 2-8:

"What is probably a record in procurement was established in the case of the contract with the Schweizer Aircraft Corporation of Elmira New York. This contract, covering three two-place gliders to CAA Class 2 requirements, with certain modifications, was signed in Washington DC on June 27, 1941. The first glider under contract has its initial flight test July 2, at Big Flats Airport, Elmira, New York and is now at Wright Field."

In the first part of 1942 Lieutenant General William S. Knudsen of the War Production Board conducted an inspection of the Schweizer factory, still located on the second floor of the Elmira Knitting Mill. He looked at the antiquated plant and instructed the Schweizers to "get out of here". He was instrumental in the move of the 2-8 production line to a new plant built for Schweizer Aircraft by the Defense Plants Corporation at the soon-to-be completed Chemung County Airport.

The US Navy and Marine Corps also ordered the 2-8 as a glider trainer.

Because the 2-8 was made from aluminum and steel, which were both declared "strategic materials", a replacement design was needed. The Schweizers designed the SGS 2-12 as a wooden version of the 2-8, incorporating some improvements, such as a lower-mounted cantilever wing to improve instructor visibility. The 2-12 succeeded the 2-8 in production and 114 were produced with the designation TG-3A.

=== Competitions and records ===
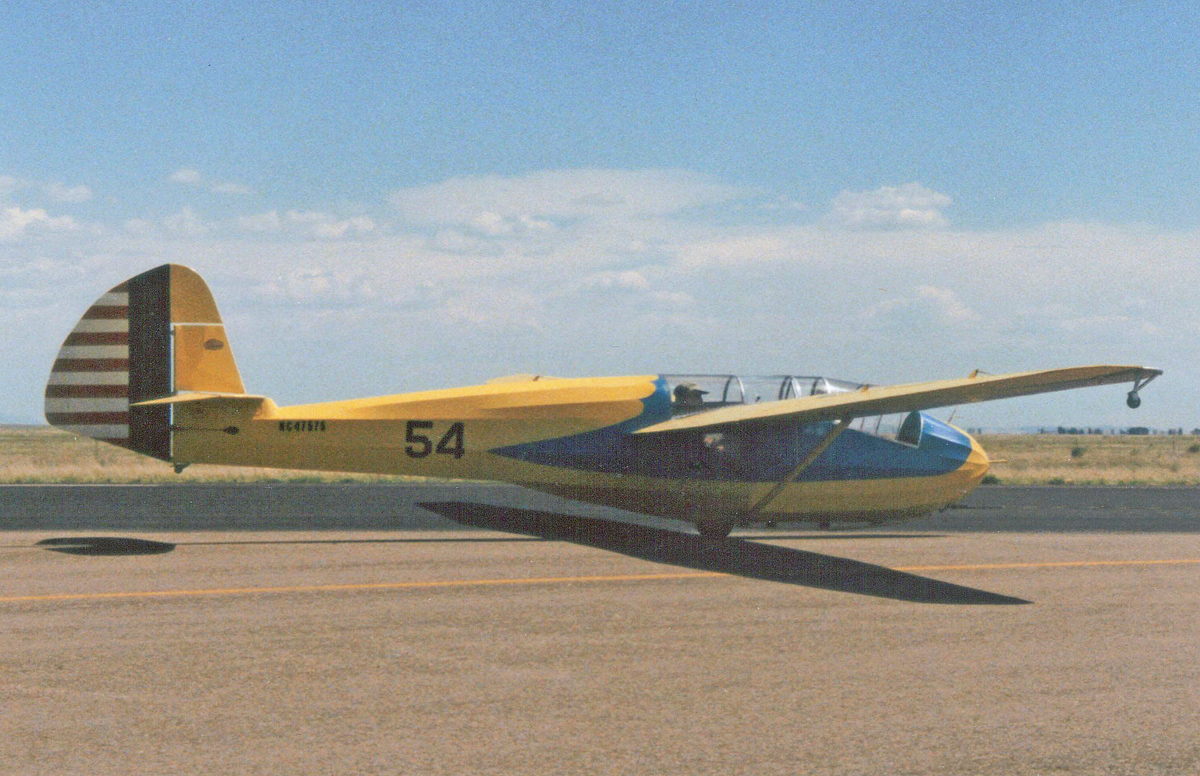
Ex USAAF Schweizer TG-2 (SGS 2-8) competing in a vintage glider event at Moriarty, New Mexico in 1997

Distance flying in the 2-8 is challenging, given its 23:1 glide ratio and red-line speed limit of just 72 mph (117 km/h). SGS 2-8s were flown in several US national competitions and held a number of records at one time.

Records held include a flight to goal from Elmira, New York to Washington, DC, a distance of 373 km (232 statute miles) flown by Bob Stanley and Ernie Schweizer.

Dick Johnson set a multi-place distance record of 499 km (310 statute miles) in a 2-8.

In May 2008 there were still 23 SGS 2-8s registered in the US along with one 2-8A.

== Variants ==
SGS 2-8
The basic factory produced model was designated as the SGS 2-8.
SGS 2-8A
SGS 2-8s assembled from factory kits were accepted as certified aircraft and were designated as SGS 2-8A. They were otherwise identical to the 2-8.
TG-2
The production version of the 2-8 for the US Army Air Force was given the military designation of TG-2, indicating "Training Glider 2".
TG-2A
The designation of TG-2A was applied to previously produced civilian versions of the 2-8 that were conscripted into USAAF use. The military tracked down all 2-8s in the USA and bought them for military training from their civilian owners.
LNS-1
The production version constructed for the US Navy and US Marines was designated as the LNS-1.

== Aircraft on display ==
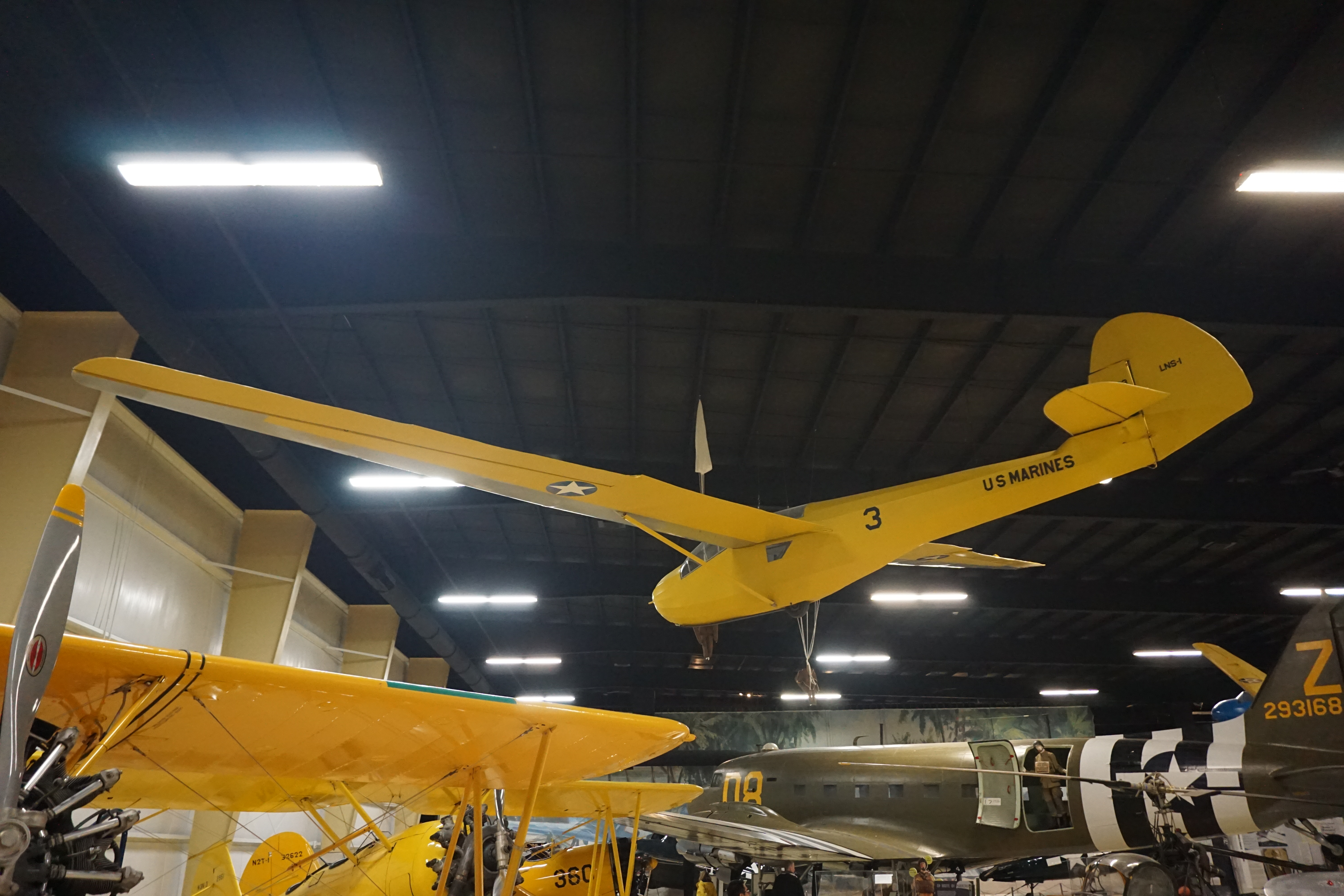
LNS-1 on display at the Air Zoo

There is a 2-8, N10VV, in the National Soaring Museum and three versions of the LNS-1, on loan to the Wings of Eagles Discovery Center, the Marine Corps Aviation Museum in Quantico, Virginia and in the National Museum of Naval Aviation at Pensacola, Florida.

== Specifications ==
Data from Jane's all the World's Aircraft 1947

General characteristics

- Crew: 2
- Length: 25 ft 3 in (7.7 m)
- Wingspan: 52 ft 0 in (15.86 m)
- Height: 6 ft 11 in (2.1 m)
- Wing area: 214 sq ft (19.9 m^{2})
- Aspect ratio: 12.6
- Airfoil: NACA 4412
- Empty weight: 460 lb (209 kg)
- Gross weight: 860 lb (390 kg)

Performance

- Maximum speed: 72 mph (116 km/h, 63 kn)
- Stall speed: 30 mph (48 km/h, 26 kn) dual
- Aerotow max speed: 72 mph (63 kn; 116 km/h)
- Winch launch max speed: 54 mph (47 kn; 87 km/h)
- Maximum glide ratio: 24:1 at 42 mph (36 kn; 68 km/h)
- Wing loading: 4.01 lb/sq ft (19.6 kg/m^{2})

== See also ==
Related lists

- List of World War II military gliders
- List of gliders
