= Schweizer SGS 2-12 =

Two-seat low-wing training glider

SGS 2-12, TG-3
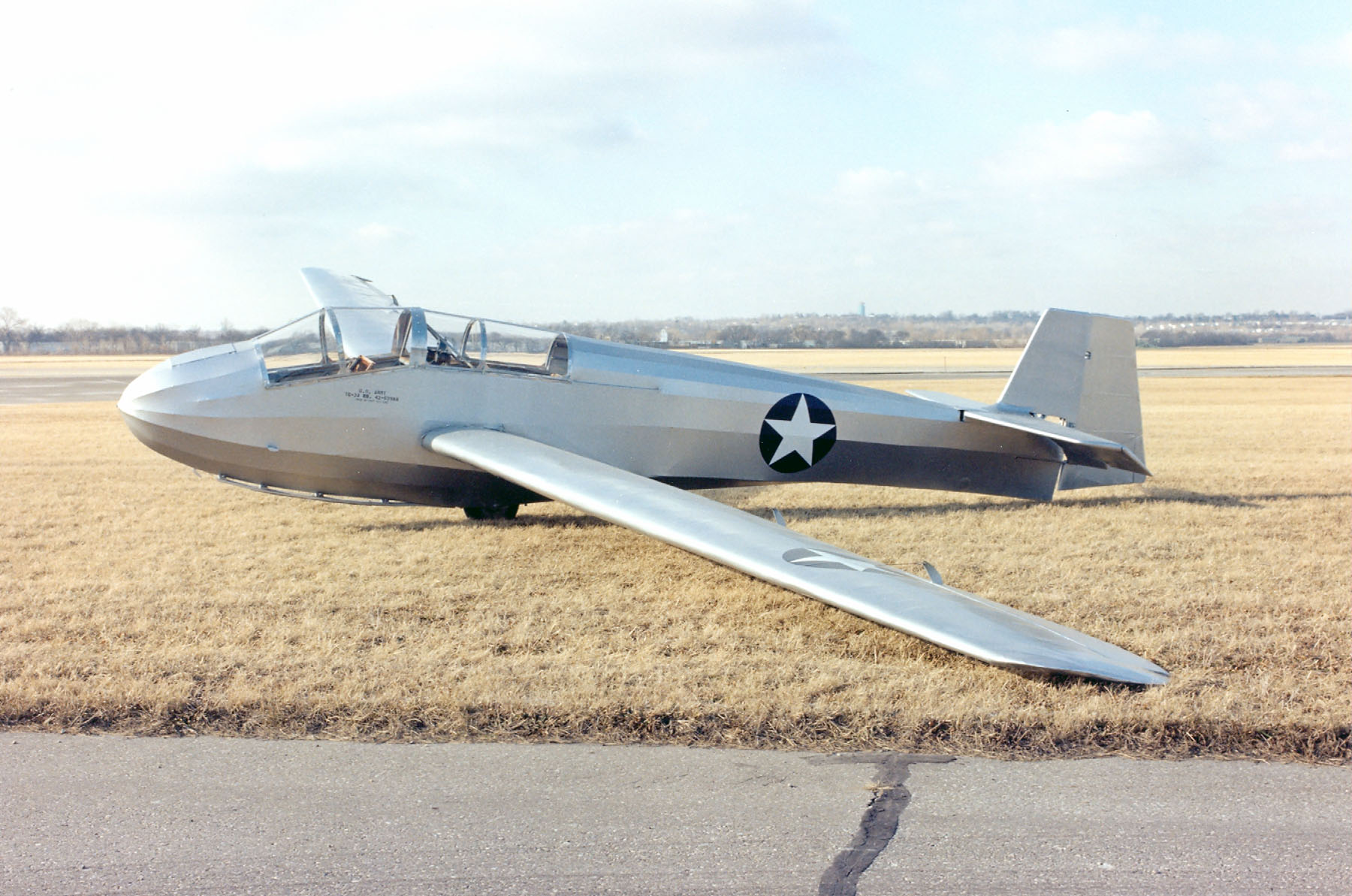
- TG-3A preserved at the National Museum of the United States Air Force

General information
- Type: Training sailplane
- National origin: United States
- Manufacturer: Schweizer Aircraft Corporation
- Designer: Ernest and Paul A Schweizer
- Number built: 114

History
- First flight: 1942

The Schweizer SGS 2-12 is a United States two-seat, low-wing, training glider built by Schweizer Aircraft of Elmira, New York.

The 2-12 was a development of the Schweizer 2-8 two place training glider, with an all-wooden wing. It was designed especially for a US Army Air Force requirement to train glider pilots for air assault missions in World War II.

== Design and development ==
When the US entered World War Two in 1941 none of the US services had a glider program. The German use of glider-borne attack on the Belgian fortress of Eben-Emael and their use in the Battle of Crete convinced the US military that they would need glider-borne forces of their own.

Initially the USAAF contracted Schweizer for the construction of the existing SGS 2-8, which entered service as the Army TG-2 and the US Navy and US Marine Corps LNS-1. The 2-8 was a good glider trainer, but had fabric-covered aluminum wings. Aluminum was designated as a "strategic material" and its use was to be avoided in training aircraft to conserve it for combat aircraft. Schweizer was therefore asked to design a new glider that would not use aluminum.

Work began on the new model SGS 2-12 in the winter of 1941/42 as production of the 2-8 was getting under way.

The 2-12 had a wooden wing, replacing the aluminum wing on the 2-8. Since the wing was being redesigned, several other improvements requested by the USAAF were incorporated into the design, including simplifying the design for mass production.

The new wing was 2 feet greater in span, giving it a slightly better glide ratio than the 2-8. The greater span also helped make up for the additional weight of the aircraft. Typical empty weights were almost double that of the 2-8 at 860 lbs (390 kg).

The wing was also thicker in section, with a thicker spar, which allowed the elimination of the struts that the 2-8 had used, while permitting a higher redline speed. The wing was also moved from a mid-wing position to a low-wing, to improve the instructor's visibility from the rear cockpit. The new wing also incorporated balanced top and bottom surface divebrakes, replacing the 2-8's top surface spoilers.

The 2-12 has a welded steel tube fuselage covered in aircraft fabric. The wood wings are also covered in aircraft fabric.

The 2-12 received type certificate G-2-11 after the war was over, on 27 February 1947. All aircraft are officially FAA certificated as TG-3As, rather than SGS 2-12s.

== Operational history ==
A total of 113 TG-3As were built for USAAF use, including three XTG-3 prototypes. One TG-3A was constructed by Air Glider as part of an order for 50 TG-3As, but that company's contract performance was not acceptable to the USAAF and further orders were cancelled.

All remaining military TG-3As were sold to gliding schools and individuals at the end of the war. One civil SGS 2-12 was completed by Schweizer for factory use at the very end of the military TG-3A production line, bringing the total completed to 114.

The SGS 2-12 is a large and heavy glider. It is also difficult and time-consuming to remove the wings for trailering or storage. After the war, when many were in civil service these factors resulted in many being tied down outside, rather than being protected in trailers. The wooden wings on many suffered deterioration as a result of exposure to the weather.

=== Records ===
The 2-12 was a rugged sailplane capable of high-altitude flight and was much sought after following World War Two. 2-12s were used to set several records.

On November 4, 1945 Frank Hurtt and Paul A. Schweizer broke the multi-place duration record in a TG-3A. The flight was flown at Harris Hill in ridge lift and lasted 9:17 and was the first post war record set in the USA.

In 1950 Harland Ross set a new altitude record with a 2-12 flight to 36,100 feet (11,003 m)

Betsy Woodward set the feminine altitude record in a 2-12 as well.

== Variants ==
XTG-3

Three prototype TG-3s were constructed under the designation XTG-3.

TG-3A

The USAAF variant. All surplus aircraft sold at the end of the war were TG-3As. 110 produced.

SGS 2-12

One civil SGS 2-12 was completed.

== Aircraft on display ==
- Icelandic Aviation Museum, Akureyri, Iceland - TG-3A, SN 42-53120. The Akureyri Gliding Club bought this glider in 1946. It last flew 13 June 1993.
- National Museum of the United States Air Force – TG-3A was restored by the Spartan School of Aeronautics in Tulsa, Oklahoma and donated to the museum in December 1980.
- National Soaring Museum – 1943 model TG-3A, N61279. This aircraft is displayed with its entire left side and wing revealed without fabric installed.
- Western Antique Aeroplane & Automobile Museum
- US Southwest Soaring Museum
- Gliding Heritage Centre -TG3A in flying condition

== Survivors ==
In March 2011 there were still 29 TG-3As registered in the USA.

== Specifications (TG-3) ==
Data from Jane's all the World's Aircraft 1947

General characteristics

- Crew: 2
- Length: 27 ft 7 in (8.4 m)
- Wingspan: 54 ft 0 in (16.47 m)
- Height: 8 ft 0 in (2.44 m)
- Wing area: 237 sq ft (22.0 m^{2})
- Airfoil: NACA 4416
- Empty weight: 820 lb (372 kg)
- Gross weight: 1,200 lb (544 kg)

Performance

- Stall speed: 38 mph (61 km/h, 33 kn) *Aerotow max speed: 100 mph (87 kn; 160 km/h)
- Never exceed speed: 100 mph (160 km/h, 87 kn)
- Maximum glide ratio: 24:1 at 52 mph (45 kn; 84 km/h)
- Rate of sink: 180 ft/min (0.9 m/s)
- Wing loading: 5.15 lb/sq ft (25.1 kg/m^{2})

== See also ==
- List of gliders
