= Schweizer SGS 1-35 =

SGS 1-35
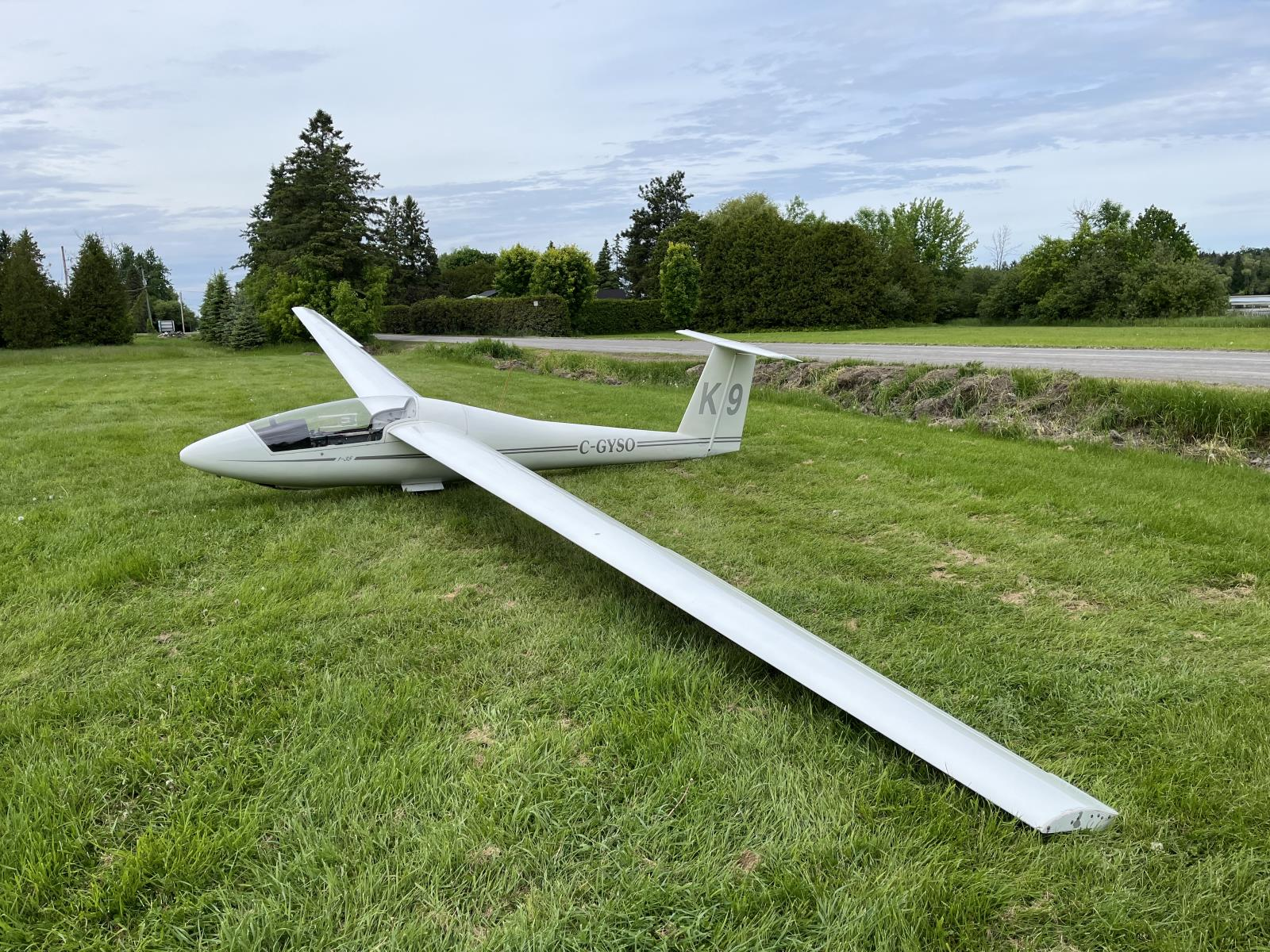

General information
- Type: Standard-class (later 15 metre-class) sailplane
- National origin: United States
- Manufacturer: Schweizer Aircraft Corporation
- Designer: Leslie Schweizer
- Number built: 101

History
- First flight: April 1973

The Schweizer SGS 1-35 is a United States 15 Meter Class, single-seat, mid-wing glider built by Schweizer Aircraft of Elmira, New York.

The 1-35 was first flown in 1973 and a total of 101 were completed by the time production was completed in 1982.

== Background ==
By the early 1970s competition in the open, standard and 15 meter classes was dominated by fiberglass sailplanes. Schweizer Aircraft evaluated the use of fiberglass for sailplane construction but rejected it for several reasons:

- The high cost of demonstrating to the Federal Aviation Administration that this new material could safely be used for aircraft primary structure.
- Problems with crash resistance of fiberglass structures in high-impact accidents.
- The unknown service life of fiberglass.
- The large amount of manual labor required to do fiberglass lay-ups at that time and the associated cost.

The company believed it could get performance equivalent to fiberglass from the material it knew best – aluminum. Experiments with the laminar flow wing of the Schweizer SGS 1-29 in the late 1950s had shown there was potential for laminar flow around metal wings.

One of the factors that convinced the company there was a market for a US-made competition sailplane was the loss of value of the United States Dollar in the early 1970s which had made European sailplanes prohibitively expensive to US buyers.

== Development ==
Schweizer Aircraft started construction of the 1-35 prototype in late 1972 and it first flew in April 1973. The company carried out side-by-side comparisons with fiberglass sailplanes as part of 50 hours of flight evaluations before making the decision to proceed with manufacturing the design on 10 May 1973.

The 1-35 is an all-metal aircraft with a monocoque fuselage. The wing has a single spar and the stressed skin features multi-stringers for stiffness, to best retain airfoil shape and laminar flow. The aircraft's elevator and rudder are fabric covered. The 1-35 carries 320 lb (145 kg) of water ballast in two wing tanks.

Because the 1969 design rules for the Standard Class allowed flaps, the SGS 1-35 is equipped with plain flaps that can be selected from −8 to +18 degrees for soaring and inter-thermal speed and +30 to +80 degrees for landing.

The 1-35 received type certificate G4EA on 25 April 1974.

The type certificate is currently held by K & L Soaring of Cayuta, New York. K & L Soaring now provides all parts and support for the Schweizer line of sailplanes.

== Variants ==
1-35

The original 1-35 model has water ballast and retractable landing gear 58 built.

1-35A

The "A" model moved the retractable main wheel further forward to allow the deletion of the nose skid. It also included a number of small aerodynamic refinements to further increase performance, including a sharper nosecone which was also used on regular 1-35s later in production. 2 built.

1-35B

There was no 1-35B model

1-35C

The "C" stood for "Club" as this model was intended to be a high-performance sailplane for recreational, as opposed to competition, flying. It was designed to appeal to private owners, commercial rental operations and gliding clubs. The "C" has fixed landing gear and no provisions for water ballast. 41 built.

== Competition use ==
The 1-35 was only competitive for a very short period of time in the early 1970s before European sailplanes such as the Schempp-Hirth Mini-Nimbus and the Glasflügel Mosquito, both introduced in 1976, out-classed it. The metal wing, while of good quality construction, just could not be made to hold an airfoil profile to the same accuracy as a fiberglass wing.

The SGS 1-35 would mark the last attempt by the company to produce a competition sailplane.

The 1-35 quickly found a home as a club and personal glider and, other than in national or world-class competition, has proved popular due to its rugged metal airframe and aesthetic appeal.

== In service ==
As of May 2025 there were still 55 1-35s registered in the USA including:

- 27 SGS 1-35
- 2 SGS 1-35A
- 26 SGS 1-35C

There are also five SGS 1-35s registered in Canada.

== Museum aircraft ==
The prototype SGS 1-35, N17900 is on display in the National Soaring Museum.

A SGS 1-35, N135V is hung from the ceiling inside the UTA Engineering building in Arlington, Texas.

== Specifications ==
General characteristics

- Crew: One
- Capacity: 400 lb (181 kg) water ballast
- Length: 19 ft 2 in (5.84 m)
- Wingspan: 49 ft 3 in (15.00 m)
- Wing area: 103.8 sq ft (9.64 m^{2})
- Aspect ratio: 23.29
- Airfoil: Wortmann FX 67-K-170/150
- Empty weight: 400 lb (180 kg)
- Gross weight: 660 lb (300 kg)

Performance

- Maximum speed: 139 mph (222 km/h, 121 kn)
- Maximum glide ratio: 38 at 55 mph (88 km/h)
- Rate of sink: 120 ft/min (0.61 m/s)

== See also ==
Related lists

- List of gliders
