= Schweizer Aircraft =

American aircraft manufacturer

- Type: Manufacturer
- Industry: Aviation
- Founded: 1939; 87 years ago
- Founder: Schweizer brothers
- Defunct: 2012; 14 years ago
- Headquarters: Horseheads, New York, United States
- Key people: CEO Paul H. Schweizer
- Products: SGS 1-26, SGS 2-33, list of models
- Parent: Schweizer RSG
- Website: schweizerrsg.com

The Schweizer Aircraft Corporation was an American manufacturer of sailplanes, agricultural aircraft and helicopters located in Horseheads, New York. It was incorporated in 1939 by three Schweizer brothers (Paul, William, and Ernest), who built their first glider, the SGP 1-1, in 1930. Previously the oldest privately owned aircraft company in the United States, Schweizer was acquired by Sikorsky Aircraft Corporation of Stratford, Connecticut in 2004, and became a diversified aerospace company. Schweizer Aircraft ceased operations in 2012. It was sold to Schweizer RSG in 2018 and production lines were opened in Fort Worth, Texas. The company was producing two helicopter models in 2021, the 300C and 300CBI.

== History ==
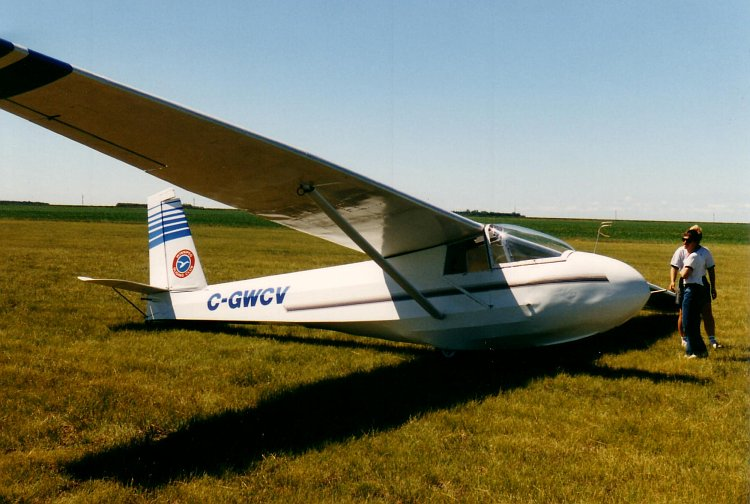
Schweizer SGS 2-33A training glider

The company grew out of the Mercury Glider Club which produced the first two Schweizer gliders in the Schweizers' barn. The company was originally called the Schweizer Metal Aircraft Company. Attorney Bob McDowell indicated to the Schweizers that they should move their manufacturing operation out of their father's barn and relocate to the Elmira, New York area. The Schweizers received the suggestion positively as they needed more space to produce gliders, but they had no money with which to make the move.

McDowell convinced Elmira Industries Inc, the local business development corporation, to provide space for the Schweizers on the second floor of the Elmira Knitting Mill Building in return for stock in the company. This resulted in the Schweizer Metal Aircraft Company becoming the Schweizer Aircraft Corporation, with a sale of shares to Elmira Industries, local businessmen and soaring pilots.

=== Helicopters ===
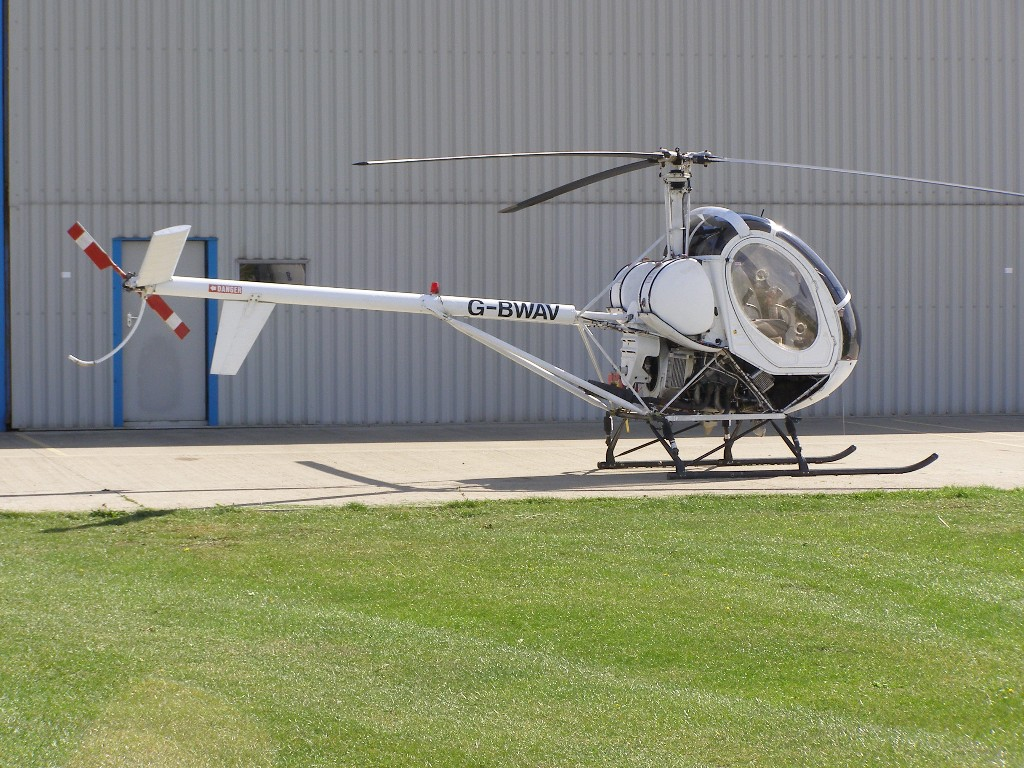
Schweizer S269C

Schweizer primarily produced light, piston-engined helicopters for use in utility and flight-training roles. The Schweizer 300CBi, originally designed and manufactured by Hughes aircraft as the Hughes 269 for the United States Army, is one of the most widely used training helicopters in the world. In 1986, Schweizer acquired all rights to the helicopter from McDonnell Douglas, who had purchased Hughes Helicopters in 1984. After Schweizer acquired the FAA Type Certificate, the helicopter was known for a short time as the Schweizer-Hughes 300C and then simply, the Schweizer 300C.

The basic design remained unchanged over the years. Between Hughes and Schweizer, nearly 3,000 copies of the Model 269/300 have been built and flown over the last 50 years. Schweizer continued to develop the Model 300 by adding a turbine and redesigning the body to create the Schweizer 330, and then further developments led to the development of the Schweizer 333.

An improved version in the series, the Sikorsky S-434, was released in 2008.

Helicopter products offered by the company in February 2009 included the 300C, 300CBi, and 333.

In 2011 and 2012 Sikorsky Aircraft Corporation laid off all the workers and closed the plant. After the sale of the company, helicopter production was restarted in Fort Worth, Texas in 2018.

=== Sailplanes ===
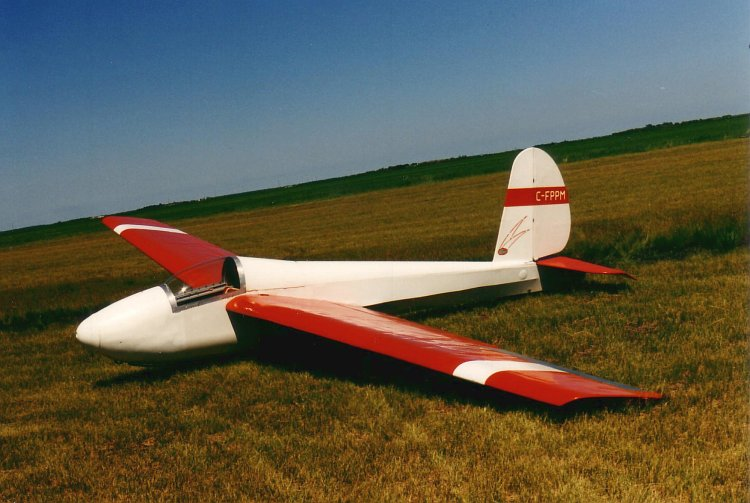
Schweizer SGS 1-26B

Schweizer is known for its popular line of gliders (sailplanes), the earliest of which (the model SGP 1-1) was produced in 1930. Although very few of the early gliders were built, later models gained popularity, such as the SGS 2-8 and 2-12, which were adopted by the U.S. Army Air Corps for training as the TG-2 and TG-3, respectively.

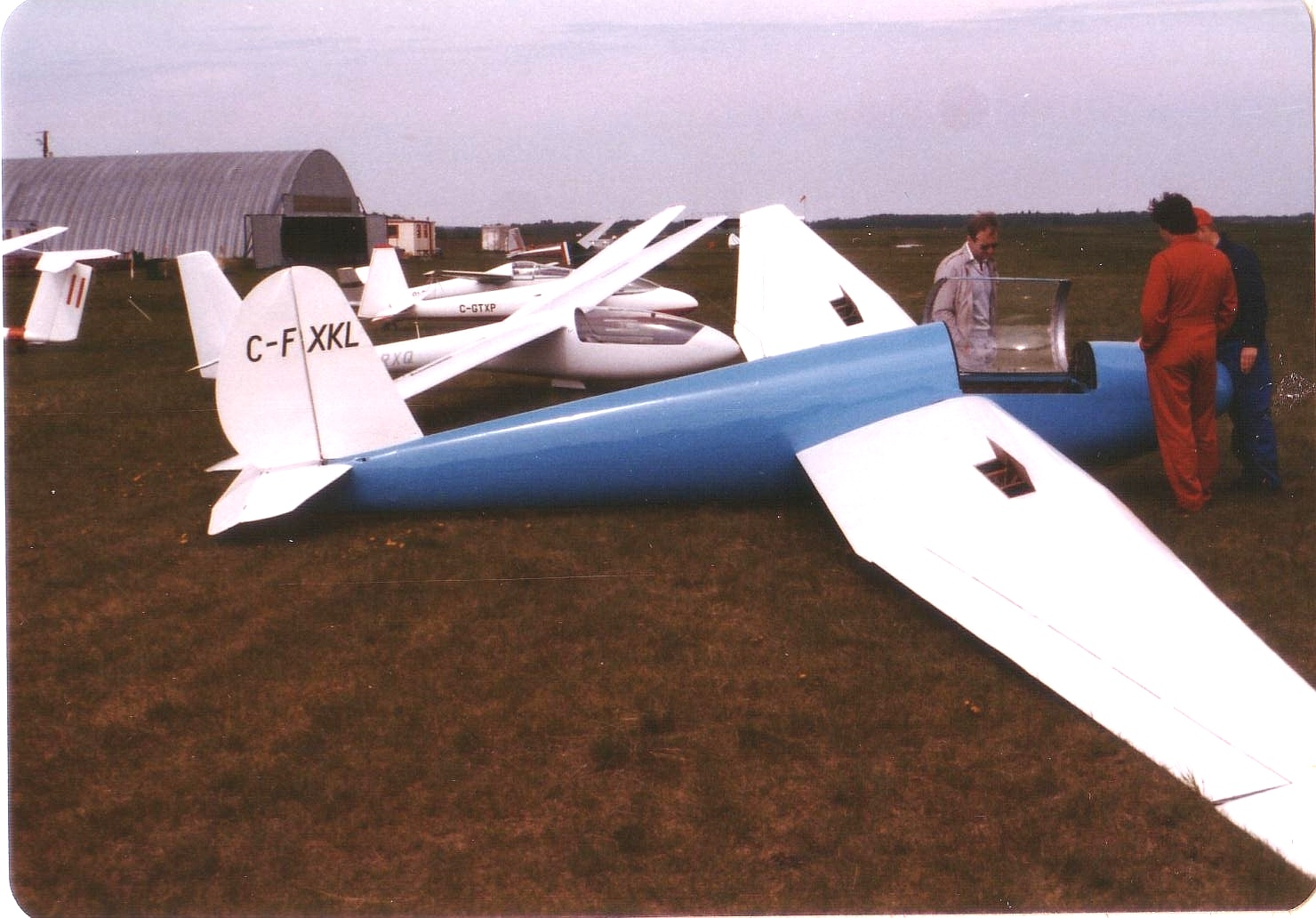
Schweizer SGS 1-23D sailplane. The 1-23 was first flown in 1948.

The Schweizer SGS 1-23 was a world class competition and record setting glider between its first flight in 1948 and the end of its production in 1967.

In the 1950s and 1960s the Schweizer Aircraft Corporation designed and manufactured the very popular SGS 1-26 and SGS 2-33 gliders. In the 1970s the single place SGS 1-34 (and 1-34R retractable gear version) was introduced. They are easy to fly, with simple construction, and are quite rugged and forgiving. Later in the 1970s and 1980s the higher performance t-tail SGS 1-35 and SGS 1-36 Sprite were introduced. A powered light aircraft, the Schweizer SA 1-30 was tested, but did not go into production.

The 2-33 was adopted by the United States Air Force Academy as the TG-4, for use in introductory airmanship training. The Academy used over a dozen such gliders until 2002 when they were replaced by more modern sailplanes. The Royal Canadian Air Cadets continue to operate a fleet of over seventy 2-33As.

The popular Schweizer gliders the single-seat SGS 1-26, the two-seat 2-33, and the two or three-seat SGS 2-32 can still be found at many gliding clubs across the U.S.

=== Ag Cat ===
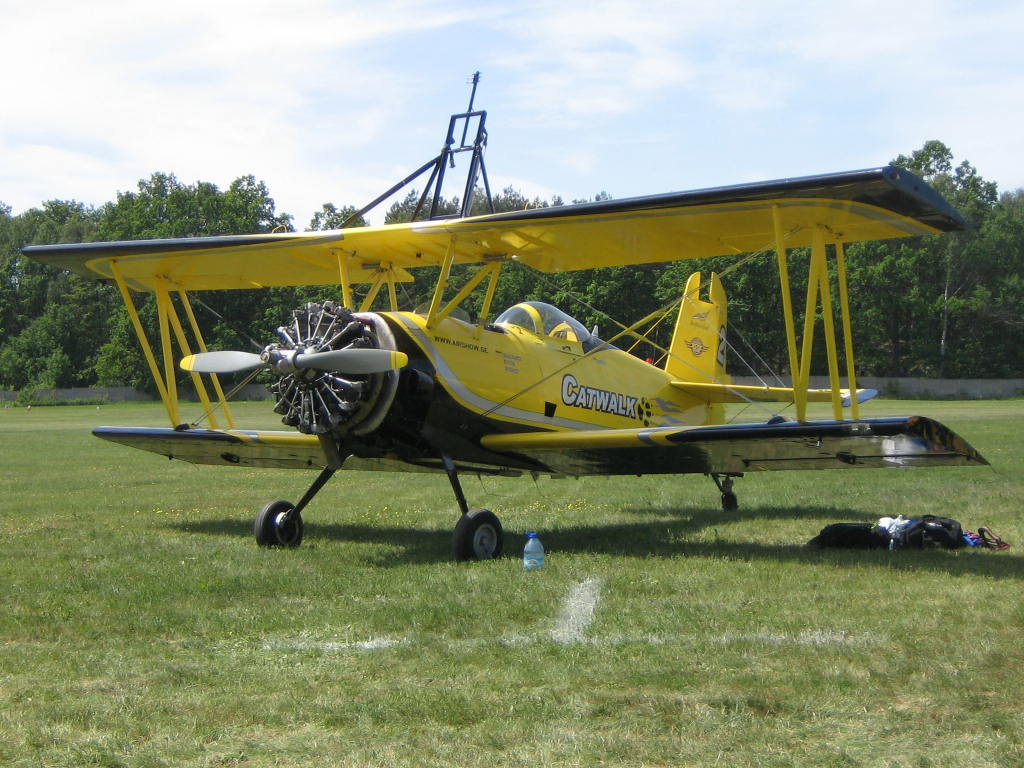
Schweizer Ag Cat

Schweizer produced the Grumman G-164 Ag Cat, a single-engine biplane agricultural aircraft originally developed by Grumman in the 1950s. Under the contract with Grumman the airplane was built almost continuously between 1957 and 1981. During this period of time Schweizer built 2,455 of the airplanes.

In 1981 Schweizer bought the rights to the design and continued production under the name Schweizer Ag Cat. In 1995 Schweizer sold the rights to the Ag Cat to Ag-Cat Corp. of Malden, Texas. In February 2001 the design was sold to Allied Ag-Cat Productions Inc. of Walnut Ridge, Arkansas. Allied Ag-Cat is not producing new aircraft although a related company operates a large fleet of Ag-Cats.

The basic airframe incorporates many safety innovations, including a pressurized cockpit to keep pesticides out, air conditioning and a fuselage structure that is designed to progressively collapse in the event of a collision.

=== Teal amphibian ===
In 1972 Schweizer hired David Thurston and production of his Thurston Teal was part of the agreement to work at Schweizer. The company produced three Schweizer TSC-1A1 Teals and nine TSC-1A2 Teal IIs before production was moved to Teal Aircraft in 1976.

=== Reconnaissance aircraft ===
The development of the Schweizer SGM 2-37 two-place motor glider for the United States Air Force Academy in 1982 led to a new area of expertise for the company. In the mid-1960s Lockheed had used the Schweizer SGS 2-32 sailplane as the basis for its YO-3 quiet reconnaissance aircraft. Schweizer decided to develop the SGM 2-37 into a similar concept aircraft as the YO-3. The result was the SA 2-37A and B, known as the RG-8A in military use.

The RG-8A was later developed by the company into the twin piston-engined and twin-boom SA 2-38 Condor with the US military designation of RU-38A Twin Condor. This design was further refined into the turboprop-powered RU-38B Twin Condor. The RU-38 was still in production in 2008.

It is believed the US Drug Enforcement Administration purchased aircraft designated Shadowhawk from Schweizer. The aircraft had a poor operational history. They may be designated SA 38B.

=== Other projects ===
In partnership with Northrop Grumman (formerly Ryan Aeronautical), Schweizer developed the MQ-8 Fire Scout helicopter UAV.

Schweizer participated in development of Sikorsky's X-2 Demonstrator, a prototype aircraft using co-axial rotor blades with a pusher propeller for extra forward thrust.

=== Sale to Schweizer RSG ===
United Technology Corporation (UTC), then parent company of Sikorsky, shut down Schweizer in December 2012. It was sold to a new company, Schweizer RSG, in 2018 and the production lines were restarted in Fort Worth, Texas. The company was producing three models in 2021, the 300C, 300CBi, and 333.

== Products ==
=== Sailplanes ===
- Schweizer SGP 1-1
- Schweizer SGS 1-21
- Schweizer SGS 1-23
- Schweizer SGS 1-24
- Schweizer SGS 1-26
- Schweizer SGS 1-29
- Schweizer SGS 1-34
- Schweizer SGS 1-35
- Schweizer SGS 1-36 Sprite
- Schweizer SGS 2-8
- Schweizer SGS 2-12
- Schweizer SGS 2-25
- Schweizer SGS 2-32
- Schweizer SGS 2-33
- Schweizer SGU 1-2
- Schweizer SGU 1-6
- Schweizer SGU 1-7
- Schweizer SGU 1-19
- Schweizer SGU 2-22
- Schweizer X-26 Frigate
- Schweizer cargo glider designs

=== Powered aircraft ===
- Schweizer RU-38 Twin Condor
- Schweizer SA 1-30
- Schweizer SGM 2-37

=== Helicopters ===
- Schweizer 300
- Schweizer 333
