= Schweizer SGS 1-36 Sprite =

Single-seat, mid-wing glider

SGS 1-36 Sprite
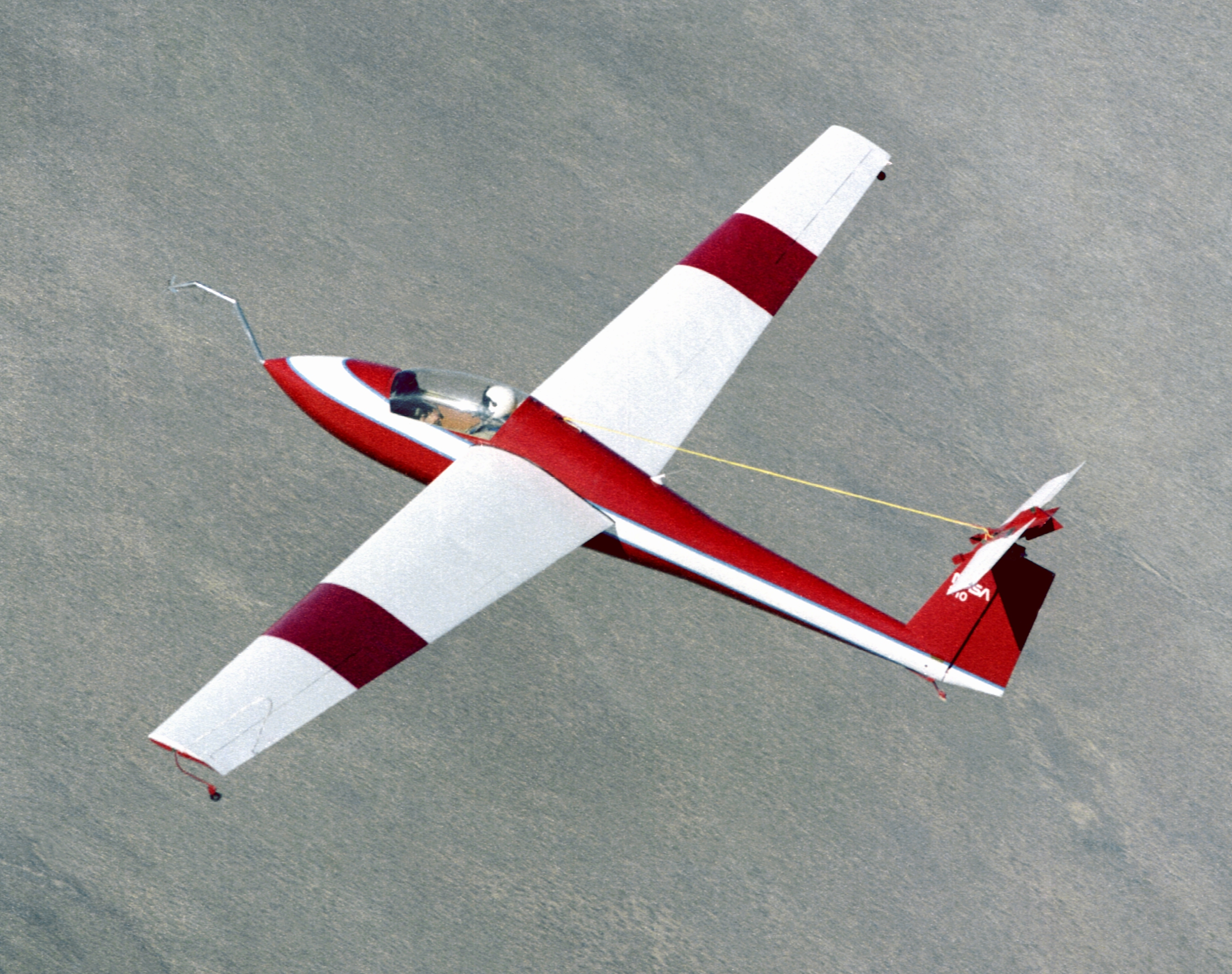
- A SGS 1-36 being used for deep stall research by NASA over the Mojave Desert in 1983

General information
- Type: Glider
- National origin: United States
- Manufacturer: Schweizer Aircraft Corporation
- Designer: Leslie Schweizer
- Number built: 43

History
- First flight: August 1979

The Schweizer SGS 1-36 Sprite is a United States, single-seat, mid-wing glider built by Schweizer Aircraft of Elmira, New York.

The 1-36 was first flown in 1979 and a total of 43 were built by the time production was completed in 1982. The Sprite was reportedly still available to customers in 1987, but none were built after 1982.

The 1-36 was conceived as a replacement for the One-design competition Schweizer SGS 1-26, when production of that model ended in 1979.

The 1-36 was also the last glider model that the company would manufacture. The completion of production of the 1-36 in 1982 marked the end of an era that started in 1930 with the Schweizer SGP 1-1.

The SGS 1-36 Sprite was the only glider produced by Schweizer that was given an official marketing name.

== Design and development ==
By the end of the 1970s the company decided to end manufacture of the SGS 1-26 one-design class sailplane, which had been in production since 1954. The 1-26 had proven the concept and popularity of one-design soaring competition and the company felt that a similar aircraft, but with more performance, would be popular.

The prototype SGS 1-36 first flew in August 1979 and the Sprite was certified under type certificate G5EA on 15 October 1980.

The first customer delivery was made on 16 October 1980 to Al Freedy of Hinckley Soaring, Schweizer's dealer in Chicago, where it was employed as a rental aircraft. In late 1980 Schweizer had 32 dealers listed and each one was required to order an SGS 1-36.

The 1-36 is an all-metal aircraft with a monocoque fuselage. The wing is covered in aluminum sheet and the aircraft's elevator and rudder are fabric covered. The Sprite's wing has balanced top and bottom divebrakes set well aft near the trailing edge. The 1-36 is not equipped for water ballast.

The SGS is equipped with a 13-inch (330 mm) diameter X 5-inch (130 mm) main wheel. The wheel has a hydraulic brake that is actuated by full application of the spoilers.

The pitot tube is installed in the nose air intake, which gives it good protection during ground handling. The static ports are located 14 inches (36 cm) aft of the nose and the fuselage sides. Their location provides accurate indicated airspeed above 56 knots (64 mph; 104 km/h) but provide increasing errors below that speed, up to 4.5 knots (5.2 mph; 8.3 km/h) at the stall.

Assembly of the 1-36 is accomplished by inserting the wings and installing the main spar pins and fore and aft drag pins. The T-tail has a fixed section and the two horizontal stabilizer and elevator sections are inserted in that and retained with one pin. The elevators and divebrakes hook up automatically on assembly, but the ailerons require the manual insertion of pins.

The Sprite was built in two different versions, differing only in main wheel placement.

The 1-36 type certificate is currently held by K & L Soaring of Cayuta, New York. K & L Soaring now provides all parts and support for the Schweizer line of sailplanes.

=== Independent flight testing ===
Independent flight testing of the SGS 1-36 was carried out in January 1982 by Dick Johnson and the Dallas Gliding Association and published in the Soaring Society of America's journal, Soaring, in March 1982.

The evaluation flights showed that the aircraft has a glide ratio of 31:1 at 42 knots (78 km/h) calibrated airspeed (48 mph (77 km/h), the same glide ratio claimed by the factory. Measured minimum sink rate was 130 ft/min (2.17 ft/s) at 39 knots (45 mph; 72 km/h). The roll rate at 40 knots (74 km/h) was 6 seconds from 45 degrees to 45 degrees. Flight testing did note that the 1-36 has a tendency to oscillate in pitch while on aero-tow, but this was easily controlled by the pilot with practice.

Johnson's flight test evaluation indicated that the 1-36 out-performed the 1-26E by a margin of 45%.

The flight test evaluation concluded:

All considered, the new 1-36 sailplane appears to be an excellent intermediate-performance sailplane with markedly better performance than its 1-26 predecessor. Its robust and durable aluminum construction should make it an attractive sailplane for clubs, sport fliers, and one-design-class advocates.

== Operational history ==
As a result of the low numbers produced, the 1-36 did not find a following as a one-design competition class, but it remains popular as a club, rental and personal glider.

As of November 2017 there were still 29 SGS 1-36s registered in the US and one in Canada.

=== NASA research project ===
The Schweizer SGS 1-36 Sprite experimental prototype, registered N502NA, was acquired by NASA's Dryden Flight Research Center at Edwards, California and used for research into controlled, deep-stall conditions at an angle of attack of more than 30 degrees. The Sprite was used for the test program because of its slow speed and the simple aerodynamics of its long unswept wing.

Schweizer Aircraft modified the Sprite's horizontal stabilizer to allow it to produce an elevator angle of up to 70 degrees. NASA also modified the Sprite to permit better pilot entry and exit. Radio-controlled-model, ground tests and simulator tests were conducted before crewed flight.

During September and October 1983 NASA flew the test program with the SGS 1-36, to demonstrate whether a piloted aircraft could be controlled in flight at very high angles of attack. The 1-36 was usually aero-towed to 8,500 feet (2,600 m) to conduct these test flights.

The program results showed that the Sprite could be safely controlled at angles of attack of 30 to 72 degrees and at high rates of descent.

== Variants ==
1-36 version 36903-1

This model has a forward-position main wheel, a sprung tailwheel and no nose skid. It was intended for the private ownership market.

1-36 version 36903-3

This model has an aft-position main wheel, a non-sprung tailwheel and an aluminum nose skid. It was intended for purchase by schools and clubs.

== Specifications (1-36 Sprite) ==
Data from Jane's All the World's Aircraft 1988-89

General characteristics

- Crew: 1
- Length: 20 ft 7.0 in (6.274 m)
- Wingspan: 46 ft 2.0 in (14.072 m)
- Height: 4 ft 9 in (1.45 m)
- Wing area: 140.9 sq ft (13.09 m^{2})
- Aspect ratio: 15.5
- Airfoil: Root:Wortmann FX61-163, tip:Wortmann FX60-126
- Empty weight: 475 lb (215.4 kg)
- Max takeoff weight: 710 lb (322 kg)

Performance

- Stall speed: 31 kn (36 mph, 57 km/h)
- Never exceed speed: 105 kn (121 mph, 195 km/h)
- Winch launch max: 68 kn (78.3 mph; 125.9 km/h)
- g limits: +5.35 -2.67
- Maximum glide ratio: 31 at 46 kn (52.9 mph; 85.2 km/h)
- Rate of sink: 134 ft/min (0.68 m/s) at 36 kn (41.4 mph; 66.7 km/h)
- Wing loading: 5.05 lb/sq ft (24.64 kg/m^{2})

== See also ==
Related lists

- List of gliders
