= Schweizer SGS 1-23 =

Single-seat, mid-wing glider

SGS 1-23
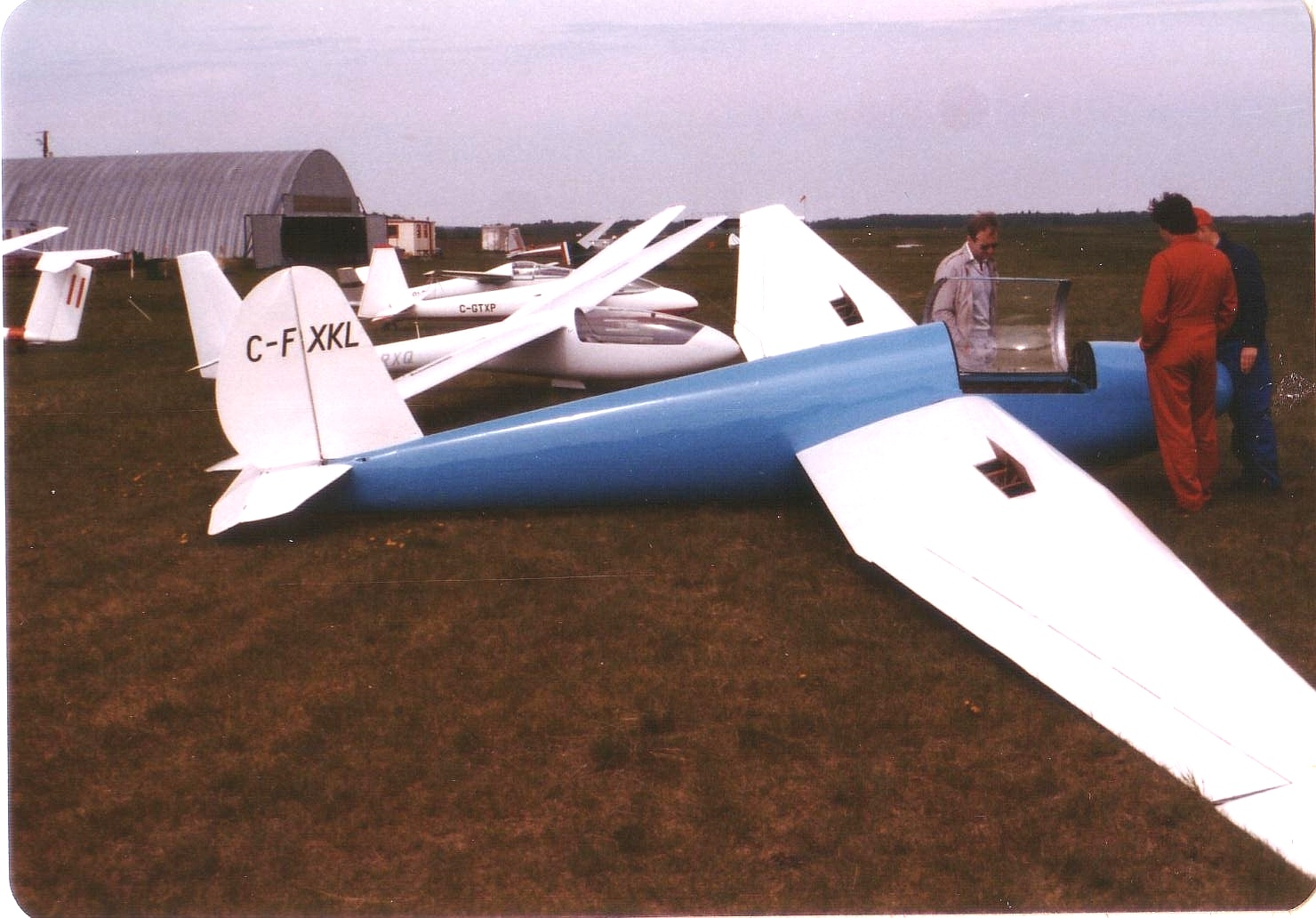
- Schweizer SGS 1-23D

General information
- Type: Open-class and Standard-class (1-23H-15) sailplane
- National origin: United States
- Manufacturer: Schweizer Aircraft Corporation
- Designer: Paul A Schweizer
- Number built: 93 (all marks)

History
- First flight: 5 July 1948

The Schweizer SGS 1-23 is a United States Open and Standard Class, single-seat, mid-wing glider built by Schweizer Aircraft of Elmira, New York.

The original "standard" 1-23 was introduced in 1948. The aircraft quickly became the most numerous competition and performance sailplane in the USA. A total of 93 of all sub-models were built by the time production was completed in 1967.

== Design and development ==
Schweizer Aircraft started construction of the 1-23 prototype in May 1948. The aircraft was completed and first flew on 5 July 1948, only nine weeks after construction had begun.

The prototype had been ordered by Bill Frutchy of Elmira, New York and the aircraft was available for him to fly it in the second half of the US Nationals.

The first production 1-23 was ordered by E.J Reeves. The success of this aircraft led to more orders and series production was commenced. The 1-23 was initially sold on a "factory direct" basis, which allowed them to be sold at a lower price than through the dealer network.

The 1-23 received Civil Aeronautics Administration type certificate 1G1 on 22 November 1949.

The type certificate is currently held by K & L Soaring of Cayuta, New York. K & L Soaring now provides all parts and support for the Schweizer line of sailplanes.

== Operational history ==
A 1-23, flown by William Ivans, set a world altitude record for gliders on 30 December 1950, reaching a height of 42,089 ft (12,840 m).

1-23Ds were flown by Paul McCready to win the 1953 US Nationals and to set a distance record of 455.5 miles (733 km) by Joe Lincoln. Lincoln was awarded the Barringer Trophy in 1960 for that distance flight.

Paul Bikle flew the sole 1-23E to a world absolute altitude record of 46,267 feet for a record gain of 42,300 feet on 25 February 1961. The records were set in the Sierra Nevada lee wave between Mojave, California and Inyokern, California. Bikle flew the record flights without cabin pressurization or a pressure suit. His record stood for many years.

In April 2008 there were still 49 1-23s registered in the USA and 5 in Canada.

== Variants ==
1-23
The original 1-23 model is also referred to as a "standard". The aircraft had a 43.83 foot wingspan and a glide ratio of 27:1, with a minimum sink of 2.3 feet per second.

Gross weight for serial numbers 1 to 11 was 600 lbs. Later 1-23 standards had a gross weight of 660 lbs. One "standard" was retrofitted at the factory with water ballast for Kim Scribner. There were 22 "standards" completed.

Many pilots like the faster roll and better circling characteristics of the "standard" over the later longer-winged versions of the 1-23.

1-23A
There were no 1-23As built.

1-23B
The "B" model was introduced in 1952 and incorporated a longer wing of 50 feet in span. The spars were standard 1-23 spars with a spliced section added. There was only one "B" model built. It was a custom order for Paul MacCready specifically to fly in the 1952 World Gliding Championships held in Madrid, Spain.

The production version of the "B" model was the "D" model. The 1-23B was not certified.

1-23C
The "C" model was also built in 1952 and, like the "B", incorporated a longer wing with a 50 foot span. The "C" had heavier wing skins and a heavier spar and, as a result, weighed 90 lbs more than the "B". There was only one "C" model built for the designer Paul A Schweizer specifically to fly in the 1952 World Gliding Championships held in Madrid, Spain.

The 1-23C was not certified.

The "C" was subsequently sold to by Larry Gehrlein who modified it to a large degree. It was crashed and rebuilt with a set of 1-23D wings. It was later damaged again in an accident and rebuilt by the factory as a "D" model. In the mid-1980s it was owned by the Rochester Soaring Club.

The "C" wings were also later rebuilt and used in the homebuilt Gehrlein Precursor. The Precursor mounts the 1-23C wings high on a Schweizer 1-26A fuselage to produce an aircraft with a 53.5 foot wing span and a glide ratio of 32:1.

1-23D

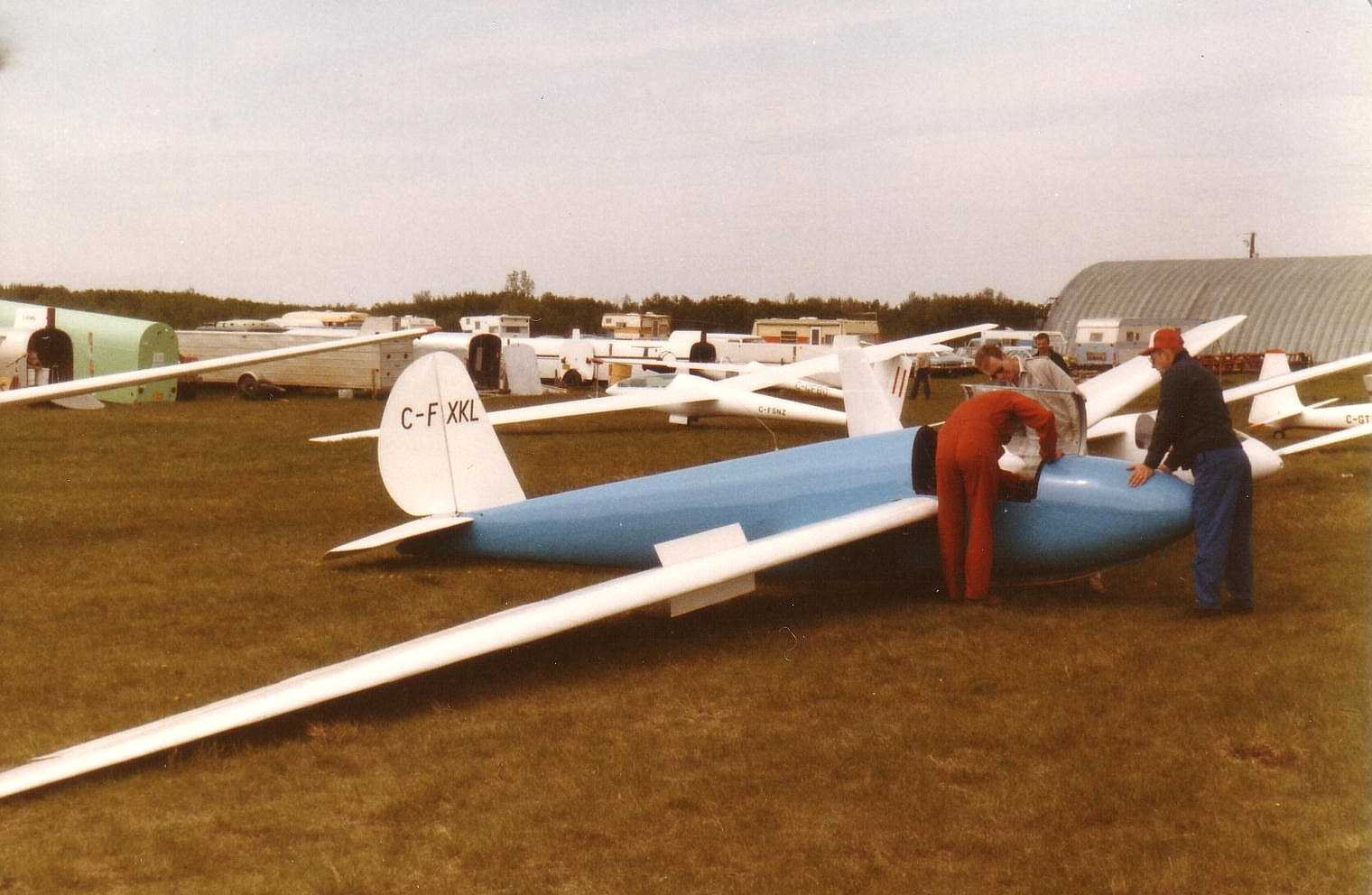
Schweizer 1-23D

The 1-23D was introduced in 1953 and incorporated the improvements tested in the "B" and "C" models at the 1952 World Championships and beyond.

The "D" has a wingspan of 50 feet and a glide ratio of 30:1 at 48 mph, with a minimum sink of 2.0 feet per second at 36 mph. The gross weight on the "D" and later models is 750 lbs.

A total of 12 "D" models were produced. The aircraft received its type certificate on 1 June 1953.

1-23E
The 1-23E has 52.8 foot wings equipped with balanced dive brakes. It has a glide ratio of 31:1 at 46 mph and a minimum sink speed of 1.95 feet per second at 40 mph.

A single 1-23E model was constructed for Paul MacCready to compete in the 1954 World Gliding Championships held in Great Hucklow, United Kingdom. He flew the "E" to a fourth place finish. The aircraft was originally constructed without a wheel and used a skid for takeoff and landing. After the Worlds a wheel was retrofitted.

The aircraft was subsequently sold to Paul Bikle and he used it to set two world altitude records on 25 February 1961. In the mid-1980s it was owned by the Rochester Soaring Club. The 1-23E was not certified.

1-23F
The 1-23F was a 1-23E with the same 52.8 foot wings but was constructed with heavier gauge, butt-constructed wing skins. Only one was built.

The 1-23F received its type certificate on 12 June 1958.

1-23G
The 1-23G was the production version of the 1-23E and F. It retained the 52.8 foot wing and had the same glide ratio of 31:1 at 46 mph and a minimum sink speed of 1.95 feet per second at 40 mph. The "G" had a redesigned taller fin and top-surface spoilers only.

A total of eight 1-23Gs were constructed. The type received its type certificate on 12 June 1958.

1-23H and 1-23H-15
The 1-23H was designed by adding balanced dive brakes to the "G", designing a square fin and rudder to replace the rounded ones found on earlier models, adding removable wingtips plus other minor changes.

The "H-15" reduced the span from 52.8 feet to 49.2 feet (15.0 m) which, combined with the dive-brakes, qualified the type for the then new Standard Class. With removable wingtips the aircraft could be easily converted between the standard class and open class.

In its Standard Class configuration the "H-15" has a 29:1 glide ratio at 50 mph and a minimum sink of 2.2 feet per second at 37 mph.

The type received its type certificate on 13 March 1961 and a total of 47 were built, including 39 H-15s. Production of the "H" ended in 1967, completing a 19-year production run.

1-23HM
One production 1-23H was rebuilt as an experimental aircraft in the "racing-exhibition" category by Sterling Starr and designated SGS 1-23HM.

The HM was built by using a stock 1-23H fuselage and tail assembly. Starr built a new set of 54 foot (16.6 m) span wings with an aspect ratio of 23.5:1. The wings took 1500 hours to construct, but the resulting aircraft has a glide ratio of 33.2:1 which is a 7% improvement over the stock 1-23H. The HM later had retractable landing gear added.

The 1-23HM was flown in the 1966 US nationals.

The aircraft is registered as N94298 and is currently owned by Vincent Grisemer. It is on loan to the National Soaring Museum.

== Aircraft on display ==
- National Soaring Museum – 1-23D, N91899, and the sole 1-23HM, N94298.
- El Mirador airfield - 1-23h, ZS-GDN.

== Specifications (1-23-H) ==
Data from The World's Sailplanes:Die Segelflugzeuge der Welt:Les Planeurs du Monde Volume II

General characteristics

- Crew: 1
- Length: 20 ft 5.4 in (6.232 m)
- Wingspan: 52 ft 8.0 in (16.052 m)
- Height: 3 ft 6.7 in (1.085 m)
- Wing area: 164.94 sq ft (15.323 m^{2})
- Aspect ratio: 16.9
- Airfoil: Root – NACA 43 012A, Mid – NACA 43 012A, Tip – NACA 23 009
- Empty weight: 481 lb (218 kg)
- Gross weight: 750 lb (340 kg)

Performance

- Never exceed speed: 140 mph (225 km/h, 121 kn)
- Rough air speed max: 140 mph; 121 kn (225 km/h)
- Aerotow speed: 110 mph; 96 kn (177 km/h)
- Winch launch speed: 67.7 mph; 58.9 kn (109 km/h)
- Terminal velocity: with full air-brakes at max all-up weight 140 mph; 121 kn (225 km/h)
- g limits: +6 -4 at 125.3 kn (232 km/h)
- Maximum glide ratio: 30.8:1 at 50.3 mph; 43.7 kn (81 km/h)
- Rate of sink: 123.0 ft/min (0.625 m/s) at 37.3 mph; 32.4 kn (60 km/h)
- Wing loading: 4.5 lb/sq ft (22.2 kg/m^{2})

== See also ==
Aircraft of comparable role, configuration, and era

- Schleicher K 8

Related lists

- List of gliders
