= Schweizer brothers =

Founders of Schweizer Aircraft

Paul, William (Bill), and Ernest Schweizer were three brothers who started building gliders in 1930. In 1937, they formed the Schweizer Metal Aircraft Company. Their first commercial glider sale was an SGU 1-7 glider to Harvard University's Altosaurus Glider Club. At that time, Eliot Noyes was a sailplane pilot in the Harvard soaring club. That glider was later restored and currently resides at the National Soaring Museum in Elmira, New York.

In 1939, the Schweizer brothers relocated to Elmira, New York, and incorporated as Schweizer Aircraft. Best known internationally for their gliders, they also remembered the importance of the folks who worked with them and for them. Over their nearly 70 years, they enabled creation of various flying machines; from gliders to crop dusters to helicopters, while contributing to the aircraft industry as a whole, and the Southern Tier of New York in particular.

According to a recent editorial in the Elmira Star-Gazette, when it came time to sell the company, the brothers wanted to find a buyer who respected their values and their folks, and chose the Sikorsky Aircraft Corporation (a UTC subsidiary) in Connecticut. The sale was completed successfully in 2004, providing growth opportunities for Schweizer.

All three brothers have been inducted to the U.S. Soaring Hall of Fame; Paul and Ernest in its second year, 1955 (along with the Wright Brothers), and later William in 1984. Paul and Ernest also won the 1953 Warren E. Eaton Memorial Trophy, considered Soaring Society of America's highest award.
