= List of American gliders =

This is a list of gliders/sailplanes of the world, (this reference lists all gliders with references, where available) Note: Any aircraft can glide for a short time, but gliders are designed to glide for longer.

== American miscellaneous constructors ==
- ADI Condor – Aircraft Designs Inc
- AEA 1907 glider
- Advanced Aeromarine Sierra – Advanced Aeromarine
- Adventure Aircraft EMG-6 – Adventure Aircraft
- AGA Aviation LRG – USN amphibious twin hull transport glider
- Ahrens AR 124 – Ahrens Aircraft Corporation
- Allen AES-1 ALLEN, E. & WARNER, E. P.
- Allen AES-2 ALLEN, E.
- AmEagle American Eaglet
- American Falcon (sailplane)
- American Spirit XL
- Arup S-1 – Arup Inc (fdr: Cloyd L Snyder), 231 Lincoln Way, South Bend IN.
- Auburn Sun Spot – Auburn, Robert J.
- Baker-McMillan Cadet
- Barnaby 1909 glider
- Bartos/Nobel BN-1 Phantom
- Bauer Bird
- Bennett-Carter Dottie S – George Bennett & Richard Carter
- Berkshire Concept 70 – Berkshire Manufacturing Corporation
- Bikle T-6 – Paul Bikle
- Bock 1 – John W. Bock
- Bowers Bantam
- Bowlus BZ-1 – Michael Bowlus
- Bright Star Swift
- Briegleb BG-12 and Briegleb BG-6
- Bristol XLRQ – Bristol Aeronautical Corporation – Military Amphibian Assault Glider
- Brown Rebel
- Buxton Roundair – Jay Buxton
- Buxton Transporter – Jay Buxton
- Cadet UT-1 – Alex Dawydoff – Cadet Aeronautics
- Carnegie Tech Flying Anvil
- Cascade Kasperwing I-80
- Cessna CG-2 – Clyde Cessna
- Champion Freedom Falcon – Ken Champion
- Chanute 1902 glider
- Chanute 1904 glier
- Chanute Katydid
- Chanute-Herring 1896 glider
- Chanute-Huffaker 1901 glider
- Chase-Sisley C100-S – Robert Chase & Sisley
- Christopher AG-1
- Cordas SCS-1 – A.C. Cordas – Wade Steinruck
- Crown City Glider Club Screaming Wiener
- Curtiss Flying Boat glider – Glenn Curtiss
- Daams Falcon – Fred Daams
- Dart Aero-5 – Bob Dart
- Detroit G1 Gull – Detroit Aircraft Corporation
- Domenjoz glider
- Douglas XCG-17 – Douglas Aircraft Company
- DuPont Utility – All American Aviation / Du Pont, Richard
- Engineering Division GL-1
- Engineering Division GL-2
- Engineering Division GL-3
- Explorer PG-1 Aqua Glider aka Skliar PG-1 Aqua Glider – Skliar, Bill – Explorer Aircraft Company Inc.
- Florida BDG-1 – Florida University
- Ford 1930 Primary – Ford, Gilbert
- Ford Bluey – FORD, Gilbert
- Freel Flying Wing – Freel, Charles L. – Aircraft Rigging San Diego High School, Californie.
- Gallaudet Hydrokite – Edson Fessenden Gallaudet
- GATC XCG-16 – General
- Glidersport LightHawk
- Green-Tweed GT-2 – Green, Frank & Tweed, George
- Haig Minibat – Larry Haig
- Heath Super Soarer
- Hendrikson 1908 glider
- Hermanspann Chinook S – Fred Hermanspann & Art Penz
- Hill Flying Wing – Man powered Marske Monarch
- Hill Tetra-15 – Bob Kuykendall, Steve Smith, and Brad Hill
- Hollman Condor – Winther-hollman Aircraft Inc.
- Hutchinson HS-127 – Vernon Hutchinson
- Jobagy Bagyjo
- Johnson RHJ-6 Adastra – Dick Johnson
- Jongblood Primary – Mike Jongblood
- Kelsey K-16 – Kelsey, Frank
- Kelsey Klippety Klop – Kelsey, Frank
- Kennedy K-W – Harold Kennedy and Floyd Watson
- Kiceniuk Icarus – Kiceniuk, Taras – man powered
- Kissinger-Crookes Flying Saucer – Curtiss Kissinger, LeRoy Crookes
- Kohler Alpha – Spud Kohler
- Krutchkoff SHP-1 – HP-14 modification
- Lamson L-106 Alcor – Lamson, Robert
- Lamson PL-1 Quark – Lamson, Phil
- Langley Sailplane – Ernest Langley
- Larson Utility
- Lawrence Water Glider – L.W. Lawrence
- Leffler-MacFarlane LM-1 – Al Leffler, Walt MacFarlane, Bill Meyer
- Leonard Annebula – Bob Leonard
- Leonard 2 seater – Leonard Motorless Aircraft Manufacturing Company of Grand Rapids
- Lesh 1907
- Lesh-Wulpi 1908 glider
- Luenger Beta 1 – Hans Luenger & Josef Kohler
- Martin 1908 glider
- Masak Scimitar – Masak, Peter
- Matteson M-1 – Matteson, Fred H.
- Mattley Primary
- Maxey-Prue Jennie-Mae – Rue, Irwin & Maxey, Lyle – built by Kearns, Franck & Maxey, Lyle
- Mc Allister Yakima Clipper – Mc Allister, Charles
- McDonnell KBD Gargoyle
- McDonnell LBD Gargoyle
- McQuilkin Mach 1 – McQullkin, Robert J.
- Mead Challenger – T.E. Mead
- Mead Rhön Ranger – T.E. Mead
- Melsheimer FM-1 – Melsheimer, Frank
- Michelob Light Eagle – MIT Daedalus Project
- Midwest MU-1 – Midwest Sailplane
- Miller Tern – Terry Miller
- Monaghan Osprey – Richard Monaghan
- Montgomery California 1905 - John J. Montgomery
- Montgomery Defalco 1905 - John J. Montgomery
- Montgomery Evergreen 1911 - John J. Montgomery
- Montgomery Glider #1 1883 - John J. Montgomery
- Montgomery Glider #2 1884 - John J. Montgomery
- Montgomery Glider #3 1885 - John J. Montgomery
- Montgomery Santa Clara 1905 - John J. Montgomery
- Mooney Dust Devil – Walt Mooney
- Moore SS-1 – Arien C. Moore
- NASA Hyper III
- Niedrauer NG-1 – Niedrauer, Jerome
- Niemi Sisu 1A – NIEMI, Leonard A. / Arlington Aircraft Company
- New Jersey S.A. Sesquiplane glider – MILLER & BONOTAUX, Pete
- Noble 1960 – Noble, Bob
- Nordman 1923 – H. J. Nordman – Nordman & Flush
- Northwestern PG-1 – powered CG-4
- Olansky Straton
- Ormand Dieder Glider
- Pacific D-8 – Coward, Ken
- Parker 2nd Ranger – WL Parker
- Parker RP9 T-Bird – (Ray Parker)
- Peel Z-1 Glider Boat
- Perl PG-130 Penetrator – Perl, Harry
- Pennsylvania State University Griffin
- Peterson J-4 Javelin – Peterson, Max A.
- Pierce 0-2-1 – Pierce, Percy
- Pierce 1909 glider – Pierce, Percy
- PIP (glider)
- Posnansky/Fronius PF-1 White Knight – Ponansky, Herman and Fronius, Bob
- Privett MPA – man-powered aircraft
- Princeton Sailwing II
- PSU Griffin
- Purcell Sea Sprite
- Raven Project – Illian, Paul – man-powered aircraft
- Ree Miller Cherokee RM
- Ridgefield PG-2 – powered CG-4
- Roberts Cygnet – Donald Roberts
- Robinson Robin – Robinson, John
- Ross Ranger I – Ross, Vernie
- Ross Ranger II – Ross, Vernie
- Rowley R-100
- Rutan Solitaire – Rutan Aircraft Factory motorglider
- Sands Replica 1929 Primary Glider – Ron Sands Sr.
- Scanlan SG-1A – Thomas W. Scanlan
- Schmutzhart SCH-1 – Berthold Schmutzhart
- Schroder + Peters SP-1 V1
- SCSA Stratosailplane I – Southern California Soaring Association
- SCSA Stratosailplane II – Southern California Soaring Association
- Sellers 1908 Quadruplane glider
- Sesquiplane Glider
- Smith SG-5 Cumulus
- Smith City of Utica – Smith, Stanley W.
- Snead LRH – 1941 USN amphibious twin hull transport glider
- Spratt 1909 glider
- Sparatt 1929 glider
- Stanley Nomad – Stanley, Robert M.
- Starr 1-23HM – Sterling Starr
- Steinruck SCS-1 – Wade Steinruck
- Tangent EMG-5 – Tangent Aircraft (FAR Part 103 / motor glider / experimental)
- Timm AG-2
- Trager-Bierens T-3 Alibi – Kempes Trager and John Bierens
- Tweed GT-1 – George Tweed
- Walker Aria – Walker, Sam
- Walters Sinbad I
- Whisper Motor Glider – Whisper Aircraft
- Whitehead 1897 glider
- Wilkes BMW-1
- Windward Performance SparrowHawk
- Withacker Centerwing
- Zauner OZ-4 – HP-14 modification, Otto Zauner
- Zauner OZ-5 One-Yankee – Otto Zauner
