= ADI Bumble Bee =

Ultralight gyrocopter

General information
- Type: Ultralight autogyro
- Manufacturer: Aircraft Designs Inc
- Designer: Martin Hollmann
- Status: Plans available

History
- First flight: 1983

The ADI Bumble Bee (sometimes Hollmann Bumble Bee) is an ultralight gyrocopter marketed by Aircraft Designs Inc (ADI). It was the first of its kind when it flew in 1983 and is still available in plans form for homebuilding.

It was designed by Martin Hollmann after a back injury (sustained in the crash of the ADI Condor) prevented him from flying his previous design (the ADI Sportster) on account of not being able to lift the rotor assembly.

== Design and development ==
The Bumble Bee is a simple and lightweight design that can be built to comply with the US FAR 103 Ultralight Vehicles rules, including the category's maximum empty weight of 254 lb (115 kg). The aircraft has a standard empty weight of 253 lb (115 kg).

The aircraft consists of an open frame based on a keel tube, which supports the nose wheel at the front and the tail at the back. The pilot's seat, the engine and rotor assembly are bolted to the same keel tube. A control stick cyclically controls rotor pitch angle. The powerplant specified is a 40 hp (30 kW), twin-cylinder, two-stroke, air-cooled, single ignition Rotax 447 mounted in pusher configuration. The 38.5 hp (29 kW) Kawasaki 440 engine has also been used. The landing gear is of tricycle configuration, uses plastic-spoked wheels to reduce weight and does not include suspension. A horizontal tailplane maintains the aircraft pitch angle in flight and a large fin and rudder is provided. The main rotor system is of low-inertia and requires pilot skill to manage energy on landing.

The aircraft plans cost US$160 in 2001. Construction time is estimated as 400 hours, much of which is consumed fabricating the composite rotor blades.

== Specifications (ADI Bumble Bee) ==
Data from Bumble Bee Performance and Stress Analysis

General characteristics

- Crew: 1
- Length: 10 ft (3.0 m)
- Height: 7 ft 6 in (2.29 m)
- Empty weight: 213 lb (97 kg)
- Gross weight: 500 lb (227 kg)
- Powerplant: 1 × Rotax 447 2-cylinder air-cooled 2-stroke in-line piston engine, 40 hp (30 kW)
- Main rotor diameter: 23 ft (7.0 m)
- Propellers: 2-bladed fixed-pitch propeller

Performance

- Maximum speed: 49 kn (56 mph, 91 km/h)
- Range: 56 nmi (64 mi, 104 km)
- Service ceiling: 16,000 ft (4,900 m)
- Rate of climb: 1,500 ft/min (7.6 m/s)
- Disk loading: 1.2 lb/sq ft (5.9 kg/m^{2})
- Power/mass: 0.08 hp/lb (0.13 kW/kg)
