= GTL =

GTL may refer to:

== Organisations ==
- GTL Ltd, an Indian network service provider
- Georgia Tech Lorraine, a campus of the Georgia Institute of Technology in Metz, France
- Glenvale Transport, an English bus company
- Global Tel Link, an American telecommunications company
- Groupe Tactique Lorraine, a French resistance force in World War II
- Guntakal railway division (reporting mark), of Indian Railways
  - Guntakal Junction railway station (station code), Andhra Pradesh, India

== Science and technology ==
- Gas to liquids, a refinery process
- Gunning transceiver logic, a type of logic signaling

== Other uses ==
- GT Legends, a video game
- GTL (Grand Touring, Light); in motorsports, a 1980s light prototype (lesser than GTP) class of the IMSA GT Championship

== See also ==
- GTI (disambiguation)
- GT1 (disambiguation)
