= HS-127 =

HS-127 may refer to:

- Hutchinson HS-127, American mid-wing glider built in 1956
- Henschel Hs 127, 1930s German bomber
