= HP11 =

HP11 or variant, may refer to:

- HP11, a postcode for Wycombe Marsh, see HP postcode area
- HP-11, an alternate name for the C battery
- HP-11C, a calculator in the Hewlett-Packard Voyager series
- Schreder Airmate HP-11, a glider
- Handley Page H.P.11, an airplane that is a model of Handley Page Type O

== See also ==
- HP (disambiguation)
