= LM-1 =

LM-1 may refer to

- Fuji LM-1 Nikko, light aircraft
- Leffler-MacFarlane LM-1, glider
- Light Miniature Aircraft LM-1, light aircraft
- Linn LM-1, drum computer
- LM-1, Lunar Module of Apollo 5
