= PG-1 =

PG-1 may refer to:

- Aeromarine PG-1 - 1922 American single-seat pursuit and ground attack biplane
- Explorer PG-1 Aqua Glider - 1959 American single seat biplane glider
