= K16 =

K16 may refer to:

== Aviation ==
=== Aircraft ===
- Junkers K 16, a German airliner
- Kelsey K-16, an American glider

=== Airports ===
- Becks Grove Airport, in Oneida County, New York
- Seoul Air Base, designated as K-16 by the United States Air Force

== Other uses ==
- K–16 (education movement), an American education movement
- K-16 (Kansas highway)
- S&T Motiv K16, a South Korean general-purpose machine gun
- HMS K16, K-class submarine of the Royal Navy
- Keratin 16
- Symphony No. 1 (Mozart), by Wolfgang Amadeus Mozart
