= Aircraft design =

Aircraft design may refer to:

- An aircraft design as defined by type definition documentation:
  - Type certificate, for certified aircraft
  - Airworthiness certificate, a legal document
    - Standard Airworthiness Certificate, for certified aircraft
    - Special Airworthiness Certificate, for non-certified aircraft types
- Aircraft design process, the process of creating an individual aircraft design
- Aircraft Designs, an aircraft design and manufacturing firm based in Monterey, California, United States

== See also ==
- Aircraft designer, the person, or team of people, who design aircraft
- Category:Aviation inventors
- Category:Aerospace engineers
