= GT2 =

GT2 or GT-2 may refer to:

- FIA GT2 European Championship
- One of several categories in the FIA GT Championship
- Group GT2, former name of LM GTE class.
- SRO GT2, a class of Grand tourer racing cars aimed at gentleman drivers and maintained by the SRO Motorsports Group
- Gran Turismo 2, a racing game for the PlayStation video game console
- The Porsche 911 GT2
- Nickname for New Meadowlands Stadium
- Green-Tweed GT-2, an American single seat glider
- Gemini 2 (NASA Project Gemini), flight code "GT-2" from the alternate name Gemini-Titan 2
- A type of toothed belt used for CNC and 3D-printing machines
- Denel GT-2, a South African tank cannon
