= ADI Stallion =

US civil utility aircraft

Stallion
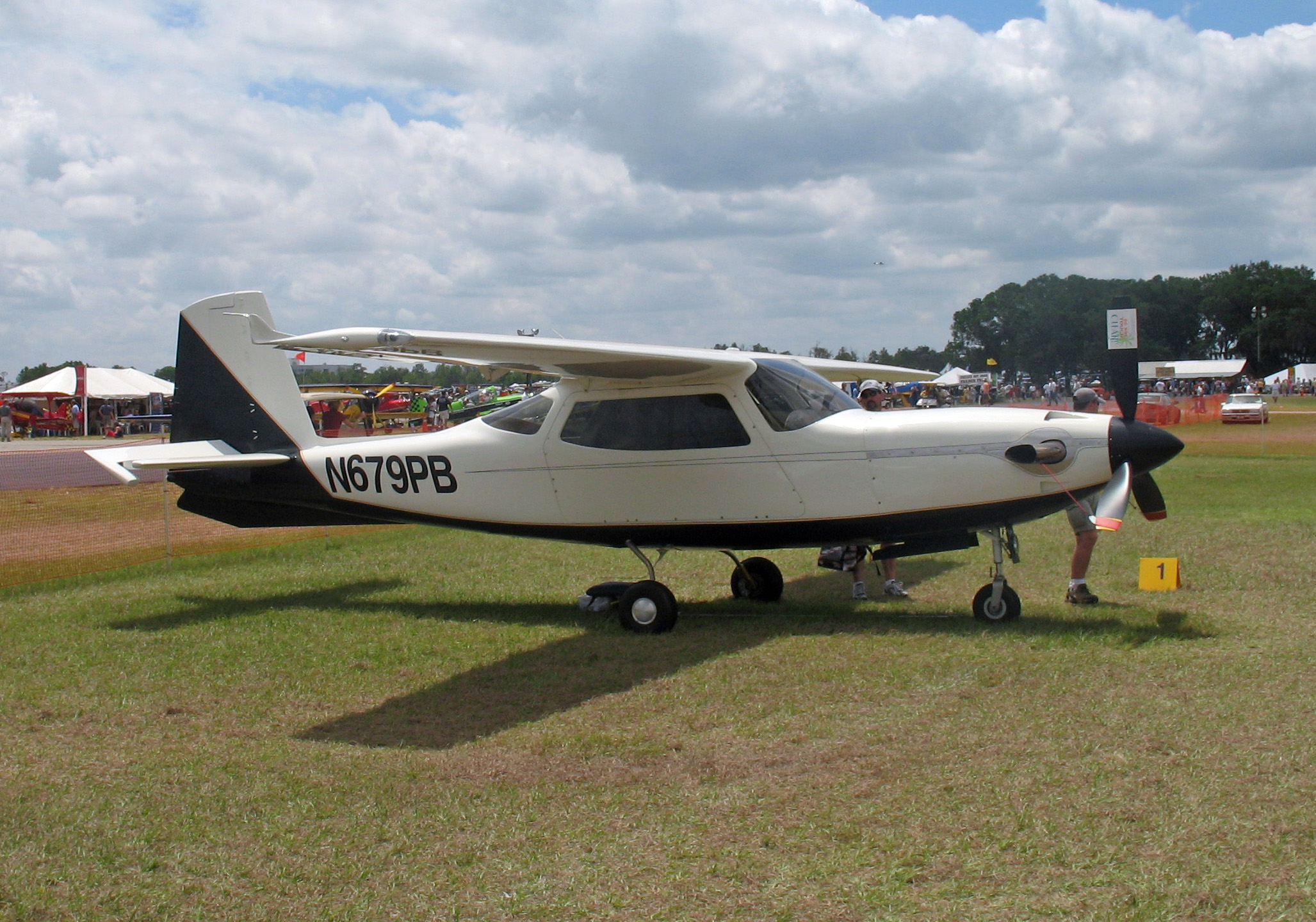

General information
- Type: Light utility aircraft
- National origin: United States of America
- Manufacturer: Aircraft Designs Inc
- Designer: Martin Hollmann
- Number built: 7 (2007)

History
- First flight: July 1994

The ADI Stallion is a US civil utility aircraft that first flew in July 1994. It is marketed in kit form for homebuilding by Aircraft Designs Inc.

== Design and development ==
The Stallion is a single-engined high-winged monoplane, with wings based on those of the Lancair ES and a retractable tricycle landing gear from the Lancair IV. It has a steel-tube fuselage center section, with the remainder of the airframe of composite construction, and is designed to be powered by engines of 230–350 hp (172–261 kW). The recommended engine is the 300 hp (224 kW) Continental IO-550, but engines as powerful as the 750 hp (559 kW) Walter M601 have been used. It is available in two versions, the four seat ADI Stallion and the six-seat Super Stallion.

== Operational history ==
Seven examples had been completed and flown by December 2007.

== Specifications (ADI Super Stallion – 350 hp engine) ==
Data from Jane's All The World's Aircraft 2003–2004.

General characteristics

- Crew: one pilot
- Capacity: 5 passengers
- Length: 25 ft 0 in (7.62 m)
- Wingspan: 35 ft 0 in (10.67 m)
- Height: 9 ft 6 in (2.90 m)
- Wing area: 140.1 sq ft (13.00 m^{2})
- Aspect ratio: 8.8:1
- Empty weight: 2,200 lb (998 kg)
- Max takeoff weight: 3,800 lb (1,784 kg)
- Powerplant: 1 × Continental TSIO-550-B air-cooled turbocharged flat-six engine, 350 hp (224 kW)

Performance

- Maximum speed: 306 mph (493 km/h, 266 kn)
- Cruise speed: 295 mph (474 km/h, 256 kn)
- Stall speed: 71 mph (115 km/h, 62 kn)
- Range: 2,700 mi (4,345 km, 2,346 nmi)
- Service ceiling: 32,000 ft (9,750 m)
- Rate of climb: 2,600 ft/min (13.2 m/s)

== See also ==
Related development

- Lancair IV
