= GT1 =

GT1 may refer to

- FIA GT1 World Championship
- Gran Turismo (1997 video game)
- Group GT1, a top-line category in GT racing 1993–1998 (known as "GTS" between 2000–2004), revived 2005-2011
  - Toyota GT-One, competed in the above category
  - Porsche 911 GT1, competed in the above category
- GT-1 (missile), a World War II glide torpedo
- Gemini 1 (Gemini-Titan 1, or GT-1), an uncrewed Project Gemini mission
- Tweed GT-1, glider
- GT1 locomotive, a Russian gas-turbine–electric locomotive
- Denel GT-1, a South African designation for the 20 pounder tank cannon
