= Parker RP9 T-Bird =

American glider

RP9 T-Bird

General information
- Type: Glider
- National origin: United States
- Designer: Ray Parker
- Status: Sole example in the Santa Maria Museum of Flight

History
- Introduction date: 1962
- First flight: 1962

The Parker RP9 T-Bird is an American, high-wing, T-tailed, single-seat, FAI Open Class glider that was designed and constructed by Ray Parker between 1956 and 1962.

== Design and development ==
Parker started construction of the RP9 in 1956 and worked on it for six years until its first flight in 1962.

The aircraft is of wooden structure, covered in fiberglass. The 50.7 ft (15.45 m) span wing employs a Wortmann FX 05-191 airfoil and features dive brakes. The aircraft takes its name from its distinctive T-tail, which was an unusual design feature when the aircraft design process was started. Soaring Magazine singled Parker's quality of workmanship out in constructing the aircraft as worthy of note, calling it "something to behold".

The T-bird was registered with the Federal Aviation Administration as an Experimental - Amateur-built. Only a single example was built.

== Operational history ==
Parker flew the T-bird to an eighth-place finish in the 1962 US Nationals. He later sold the aircraft to Frank Wilson of Orcutt, California and by 1983 the aircraft had accumulated over 480 hours of flight time. The aircraft was later transferred to the Santa Maria Museum of Flight, in Santa Maria, California.

== Aircraft on display ==
- Santa Maria Museum of Flight

== Specifications (RP9) ==
Data from Sailplane Directory and Soaring

General characteristics

- Crew: one
- Wingspan: 50.7 ft (15.5 m)
- Wing area: 120 sq ft (11 m^{2})
- Aspect ratio: 21:1
- Airfoil: Wortmann FX 05-191
- Empty weight: 545 lb (247 kg)
- Gross weight: 725 lb (329 kg)

Performance

- Maximum glide ratio: 34:1
- Rate of sink: 120 ft/min (0.61 m/s) at 44 mph (71 km/h)
- Wing loading: 6 lb/sq ft (29 kg/m^{2})

== See also ==
Aircraft of comparable role, configuration, and era

- Bikle T-6

Related lists

- List of gliders
