= Ahrens AR 404 =

Regional airliner

AR 404
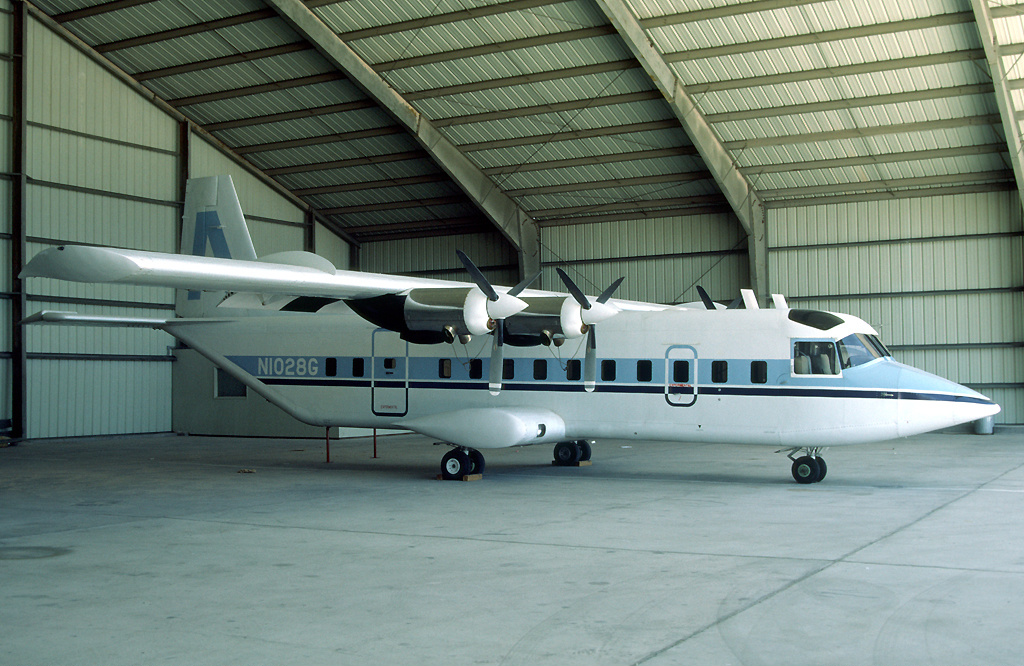

General information
- Type: Civil transport
- Manufacturer: Ahrens Aircraft Corporation
- Number built: 2

History
- First flight: December 1, 1976

The Ahrens AR 404 was a prototype American civil transport aircraft first flown in 1976, a high-wing monoplane powered by four turboprop engines. In order to facilitate the loading and unloading of cargo, the fuselage was of constant rectangular section along almost its entire length, the main undercarriage was retracted into sponsons on the fuselage sides, and the tail included a loading ramp. As a regional airliner, the AR 404 was designed to carry 30 passengers, or in its cargo configuration, to accommodate four standard D3 freight containers.

Ahrens secured a production deal with the government of Puerto Rico, which agreed to finance the type certification of the aircraft if Ahrens would establish its production facilities there. The first production aircraft was built and flown there on October 26, 1979, but no more were constructed after financing was withdrawn.

The owner of Ahrens, Peter Ahrens, claimed that "1,000 locals with no previous aircraft making experience would soon be turning out four per year", and that the AR-404 would be certified under the same standards as large jetliners but in one year instead of four. It was also claimed that the 404 could run on diesel fuel just as well as it could on jet fuel.

Ahrens projected various uses for the 404, including use as a:

- Short range troop transporter.
- 20-stretcher capacity ambulance
- Naval communications
- Gunship
- Anti-submarine Warfare
- Troop and cargo parachute drops
- Trainer

Fund for the 404 were held up by a "mysterious U.S. government investigation". While a $7.5 million loan had been secured from a private Puerto Rican lender, and the Economic Development Administration had released the loan guarantee, the Inspector General's office of the U.S. Department of Agriculture claimed to have found internal irregularities within Ahren so held up the release of funds for five months. Different Puerto Rican agencies, such as the Fomento Económico, PRIDCO, and the Governor's office tried to get the Inspector General's office to expedite the case, none of which were able to obtain any specifics. Harry Friedman, the Business Editor of the San Juan Star newspaper, was able to get in contact with Margaret Gates, the Inspector General, and was told that Ahrens would be contacted in a few weeks. These delays led many involved in the project to speculate that there was work behind the scenes to kill off the 404. T. Weller Smith, an Ahrens executive and former employee of Lockheed, marked that the 404 would be competing against the more expensive and more complicated to manufacture C-130 Hercules. The unavailability of credit eventually caused the project to be concluded with only two prototypes (one flying) completed. The flying prototype ended it's life as a snack bar.

== Specifications ==
Data from Jane's All The World's Aircraft 1980–81

General characteristics

- Crew: 2
- Capacity: 30 passengers
- Length: 52 ft 9 in (16.08 m)
- Wingspan: 66 ft 0 in (20.12 m)
- Height: 18 ft 6 in (5.64 m)
- Wing area: 422 sq ft (39.2 m^{2})
- Aspect ratio: 10.1:1
- Airfoil: NACA 64_{3}-618
- Empty weight: 9,500 lb (4,309 kg)
- Max takeoff weight: 17,500 lb (7,938 kg)
- Powerplant: 4 × Allison 250-B17B turboprops, 420 shp (310 kW) each

Performance

- Maximum speed: 220 mph (350 km/h, 190 kn)
- Cruise speed: 200 mph (310 km/h, 170 kn)
- Stall speed: 86 mph (139 km/h, 75 kn) (flaps down)
- Range: 980 mi (1,570 km, 850 nmi)
- Service ceiling: 18,000 ft (5,500 m)
- Rate of climb: 1,200 ft/min (6.1 m/s)

== See also ==
Aircraft of comparable role, configuration, and era

- de Havilland Canada DHC-7
- Short 330
