= GTI =

GTI may refer to:

== Automotive ==
- Grand Tourer Injection, a car model variant
- Maserati 3500 GTI, the first GTI car ever, from 1961
- Volkswagen Golf GTI, the first GTI hot hatch
- Peugeot 205 GTI, a famous hot hatch
- Proton Satria GTI, a sportier variant
- Suzuki Swift GTi, Suzuki GTi variant
- GTi Engineering, an auto racing team

== Other uses ==
- Atlas Air, ICAO code GTI
- Galway Technical Institute, a third level educational facility in Galway, Ireland
- Gas Technology Institute, an American non-profit research and development organization
- Gerakan Tani Indonesia, a peasants organization in Indonesia
- Gires–Tournois interferometer, a component for femtosecond lasers
- Global Terrorism Index, a report published annually by the Institute for Economics and Peace (IEP)
- Global Tiger Initiative, a conservation effort funded in part by the World Bank
- Global tilted irradiance, the solar irradiance on a tilted plane
- GrafTech, a graphite manufacturing company, NYSE symbol GTI
- Grațianite, IMA symbol Gți
- Grid-tie inverter, an apparatus to convert DC electrical (solar, wind) energy to AC and deliver it back to the grid
- GT Interactive, a video game publisher and distributor
- GTI Club, a racing game originally released for the arcades in 1996 by Konami
- GTI Mortsel, a vocational secondary school in Mortsel, Belgium
- Guilford Transportation Industries, a transportation company
- Pokémon Mystery Dungeon: Gates to Infinity, a 2012 game in the Pokémon Mystery Dungeon series
