= Hill Tetra-15 =

American glider

Tetra-15
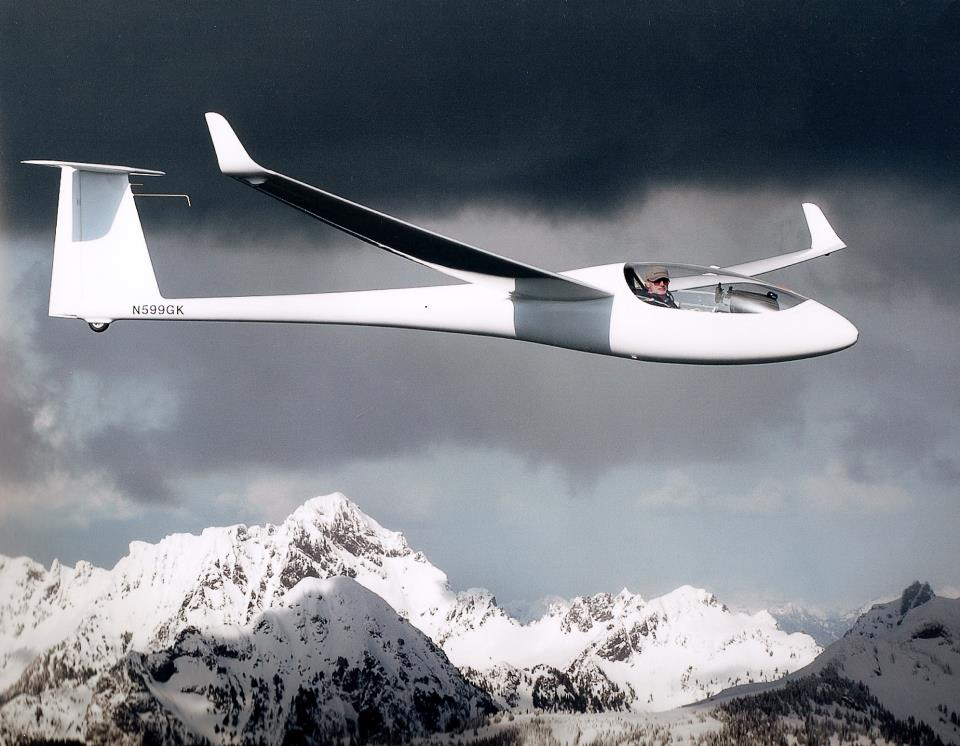

General information
- Type: Glider
- National origin: United States
- Designer: Bob Kuykendall, Steve Smith, and Brad Hill
- Status: In production
- Number built: one

History
- First flight: 2012
- Developed from: HP-24 Project

The Tetra-15 is an American mid-wing, single-seat, kit-built glider that was designed by Bob Kuykendall, Steve Smith, and Brad Hill, and built primarily by Brad Hill, Bob Kuykendall, and Doug Gray.

== Design and development ==
The Tetra-15 is the first aircraft produced from the tools and development of the HP-24 project, a project to develop and manufacture a high-performance sailplane in kit form.

The aircraft is predominantly made from carbon fiber. The wings have airfoils from the FX81 family of profiles. The wing spars use pultruded carbon fiber ribbons in the upper and lower caps. Glide path control is via mechanically actuated Schempp-Hirth style airbrakes. All wing and tail controls are automatically connecting. The retractable undercarriage is likewise manually actuated.

== Operational history ==
The Tetra-15 first flew on Friday 27 January 2012.

By December 2016 one example had been registered in the United States with the Federal Aviation Administration.

== Specifications ==
General characteristics

- Crew: one
- Length: 22 ft 11 in (6.98 m)
- Wingspan: 49 ft 2 in (15 m)
- Wing area: 107 sq ft (10.02 m^{2})
- Aspect ratio: 23
- Airfoil: Wortmann FX81
- Empty weight: 480 lb (218 kg)
- Gross weight: 750 lb (340 kg)Performance

Performance

== See also ==
Related lists

- List of gliders
