= Ahrens AR 124 =

American single-seat sailplane

AR 124

General information
- Type: Single-seat sailplane
- National origin: United States
- Manufacturer: Ahrens Aircraft Corporation
- Number built: 2

History
- First flight: 1974

The Ahrens AR 124 was an American single-seat sailplane designed and built by the Ahrens Aircraft Corporation of California. Only two sailplanes were built.

The AR 124 is a single-seat sailplane with a cantilever mid-wing, an aluminium fuselage and a swept T-tail. The landing gear was a single unsprung nosewheel with a tailwheel and the single-seat cockpit had a one-piece moulded canopy.

== Specifications ==
Data from International Aircraft Directory

General characteristics

- Crew: 1
- Length: 20 ft 0 in (6.10 m)
- Wingspan: 42 ft 7 in (12.98 m)
- Aspect ratio: 13.5
- Empty weight: 350 lb (159 kg)
- Max takeoff weight: 640 lb (290 kg)

Performance

- Maximum speed: 150 mph (240 km/h, 130 kn)
- Stall speed: 34.5 mph (55.5 km/h, 30.0 kn)
- Maximum glide ratio: 26

== See also ==
Related lists

- List of gliders
