= Bock 1 =

American glider

General information
- Type: Glider
- National origin: United States
- Designer: John W. Bock
- Status: Production completed
- Number built: One

History
- Introduction date: 1960
- First flight: 1960

The Bock 1 is an American high-wing, strut-braced single-seat glider that was designed by John W. Bock of Long Beach, California.

== Design and development ==
Bock started design of the Bock 1 in the mid-1950s, the work taking him many years to complete. His prototype first flew in 1960.

The aircraft is constructed predominantly from aluminium with some surfaces finished with doped aircraft fabric covering. The wing is a constant-chord design with a single strut and end-plates. The 34 ft (10.4 m) wing employs a NACA 63(3)-618 laminar flow airfoil. The landing gear is a monowheel arrangement.

Only the prototype was ever completed.

== Operational history ==
By 1973 the prototype had flown over 300 hours, including a flight of 7:50 and another flight to 17,100 ft (5,212 m) altitude.

In 1983 it was reported that the prototype had not flown in ten years, was permanently stored and required restoration. In May 2011 it was still registered with the Federal Aviation Administration to the designer.

== Specifications (Bock 1) ==
Data from Soaring

General characteristics

- Crew: one
- Wingspan: 34 ft (10 m)
- Wing area: 102 sq ft (9.5 m^{2})
- Aspect ratio: 11.3
- Airfoil: NACA 63(3)-618
- Empty weight: 395 lb (179 kg)
- Gross weight: 600 lb (272 kg)

Performance

- Maximum glide ratio: 18:1 at 55 mph (89 km/h)
- Rate of sink: 264 ft/min (1.34 m/s) at 53 mph (85 km/h)

== See also ==
- List of gliders
