= Steinruck SCS-1 =

American glider

SCS-1

General information
- Type: Glider
- National origin: United States
- Manufacturer: Wade Steinruck
- Designer: A.C. Cordas
- Status: Production completed
- Primary user: Wade Steinruck
- Number built: One

History
- Introduction date: 1959

The Steinruck SCS-1 is an American high-wing, single-seat, V-tailed glider that was designed by A.C. Cordas and constructed by Wade Steinruck.

== Design and development ==
Steinruck worked on the SCS-1 for many years in his spare time at his home in Spring Valley, California, completing the aircraft in 1959.

The SCS-1 is built predominantly from aluminium. It features a V-tail and a three-piece wing with a NACA 33012 airfoil. The spoilers are located in a hatch that is behind the canopy.

== Operational history ==
The SCS-1 has been flown on several recreational 200 mi (322 km) out and return and triangle flights.

In June 2011 the aircraft was still registered with the Federal Aviation Administration to Steinruck, 52 years after its completion.

== Specifications (SCS-1) ==
Data from Sailplane Directory and Soaring

General characteristics

- Crew: one
- Wingspan: 44 ft 0 in (13.41 m)
- Wing area: 132.5 sq ft (12.31 m^{2})
- Aspect ratio: 14.6:1
- Airfoil: NACA 33012
- Empty weight: 326 lb (148 kg)
- Gross weight: 550 lb (249 kg)

Performance

- Maximum glide ratio: 30 at 55 mph (89 km/h)
- Rate of sink: 132 ft/min (0.67 m/s) at 45 mph (72 km/h)
- Wing loading: 4.15 lb/sq ft (20.3 kg/m^{2})

== See also ==
Related lists

- List of gliders
