= ADI Sportster =

Two-seat gyroplane

Sportster

General information
- Type: Autogyro
- Manufacturer: Aircraft Designs
- Designer: Martin Hollmann
- Number built: 65 (2005)

History
- First flight: 1974

The ADI Sportster is a two-seat gyroplane that has been marketed in plans form for homebuilding since 1974 by Aircraft Designs Inc. It was the first homebuilt gyrocopter design to be able to carry a passenger.

The design first flew in 1974 and is built from bolted and riveted dural aluminium sheet. The rotor blades use an NACA 8H12 airfoil

== Specifications ==
Data from Bertrand and Kitplanes

General characteristics

- Crew: one
- Capacity: one passenger
- Length: 12 ft 0 in (3.66 m)
- Height: 8 ft 0 in (2.44 m)
- Airfoil: NACA 8H12
- Empty weight: 650 lb (295 kg)
- Gross weight: 1,100 lb (499 kg)
- Fuel capacity: 17 U.S. gallons (64 L; 14 imp gal)
- Powerplant: 1 × Lycoming O-320 4-cyl. air-cooled horizontally opposed piston engine, 150 hp (110 kW)
- Main rotor diameter: 28 ft 0 in (8.53 m)
- Main rotor area: 616 sq ft (57.2 m^{2})

Performance

- Maximum speed: 90 mph (140 km/h, 78 kn)
- Cruise speed: 75 mph (121 km/h, 65 kn)
- Range: 150 mi (240 km, 130 nmi)
- Service ceiling: 12,000 ft (3,700 m)
- Rate of climb: 1,000 ft/min (5.1 m/s)
- Disk loading: 1.8 lb/sq ft (8.8 kg/m^{2})
- Power/mass: 0.14 hp/lb (0.22 kW/kg)

Avionics

- none
