= Monaghan Osprey =

American glider

Osprey

General information
- Type: Glider
- National origin: United States
- Designer: Richard C. Monaghan
- Status: Production completed
- Number built: One

History
- First flight: May 1973

The Monaghan Osprey is an American mid-wing, single-seat, T-tailed, FAI Standard Class glider that was designed and constructed by Richard C. Monaghan of Pearblossom, California.

== Design and development ==
Monaghan's design goals for the Osprey were safety, ease of assembly, ease of transport via trailer and competitive performance with contemporary standard class machines. He built the aircraft over a period of three years, with help from his wife Rosan. He first flew the Osprey in May 1973, indicating that it met all the design goals, but "I am sure if were to do it again I would do better".

The Osprey fuselage is of aluminium construction, with a fiberglass and foam sandwich forward fuselage and cockpit area. The monowheel landing gear is retractable. The metal wing features 90° flaps and employs a Wortmann FX 60-163 at the wing root becoming a Wortmann FX 60-126 at the wing tip.

The aircraft is registered with the Federal Aviation Administration in the Experimental - Amateur Built category.

== Operational history ==
In June 2011, 38 years after it first flew, the Osprey remained registered to the designer and his wife as co-partners.

== Specifications (Osprey) ==
Data from Sailplane Directory and Soaring

General characteristics

- Crew: one
- Wingspan: 49 ft 3 in (15 m)
- Wing area: 104 sq ft (9.7 m^{2})
- Aspect ratio: 23.3
- Airfoil: Root: Wortmann FX 60-163, tip: Wortmann FX 60-126
- Empty weight: 440 lb (200 kg)
- Gross weight: 640 lb (290 kg)

Performance

- Wing loading: 6.1 lb/sq ft (30 kg/m^{2})

== See also ==
Related lists

- List of gliders
