= Hall Cherokee II =

American glider

Cherokee II
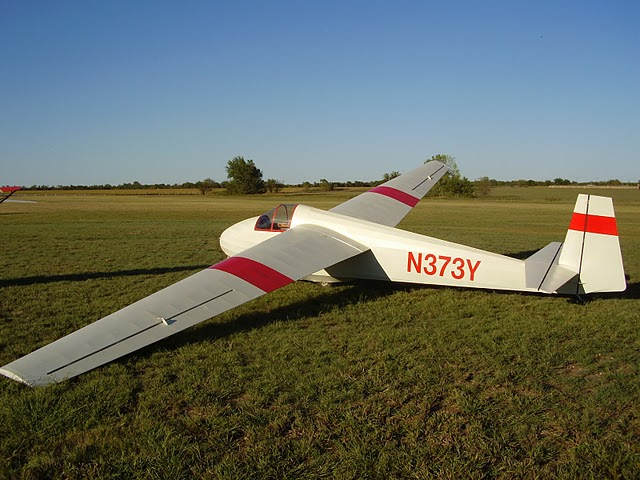

General information
- Type: Glider
- National origin: United States
- Designer: Stan Hall
- Status: Plans no longer available
- Number built: about 106

History
- Introduction date: 1956
- First flight: 1956
- Variant: Leonard Annebula

The Hall Cherokee II is an American high-wing, single seat glider that was designed by Stan Hall and introduced in 1956 as plans for amateur construction.

Due to its low cost and ease of construction, the Cherokee II is one of the most produced home-built gliders.

== Design and development ==
The Cherokee was designed by Hall to provide homebuilders with an easy-to-construct and inexpensive aircraft that would give performance at least equal to the Schweizer SGS 1-26, which had flown two years earlier.

The Cherokee structure is built from wood and covered in doped aircraft fabric covering. The fuselage features truss construction, with longerons and gussets and a fixed monowheel landing gear. The wing has two spars, with geodetic braces handling the torsion loads and is built with a fixed center section and removable outer wing panels. The wings have spoilers on the top surfaces and use a Gö 549 airfoil.

As with all plans-built aircraft, builders have made modifications to the design. Some examples have been built with leading edges made from aluminium, cardboard, glass reinforced plastic and plywood and with many different styles of canopy.

== Operational history ==
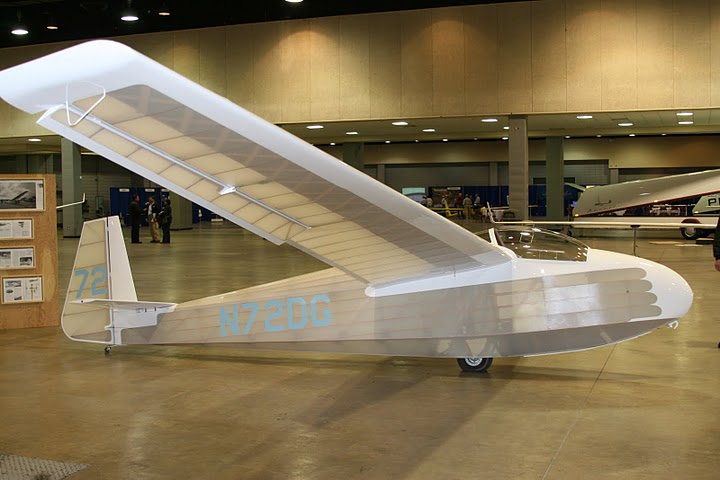
Cherokee II on display at 2010 SSA Convention

The first Cherokee II to fly was built by Frank Kerns and George McGinnis in 1956. The first flight was done by the designer, Stan Hall, in the late summer of 1956.

Cherokee IIs have been used to earn many Gold badges as well as some Diamond badge legs. The first 300 km flight of a Cherokee II, for Gold Distance and Diamond Goal, was done by Ray Proenneke in April 1960. To date, the longest distance flown in a Cherokee II is 260 miles (420 km), flown by Jim Hard in June 1965. In July 2012, Tony Condon flew his Cherokee II on a 300 km FAI Triangle closed course flight.

Cherokee IIs have occasionally been flown in competition, usually in regional handicapped contests. The prototype Cherokee II was entered in the 1956 US National Championships at Grand Prairie, Texas, but was not allowed to compete as it had not flown the FAA-required 50 hours of flight test time within 25 miles (40 km) of its home airport. In 1959, two Cherokee IIs competed at the Canadian national contest, with Ross Grady placing second and a team of Jim Reid and Ken Lewandowski coming in third. In Class II of the 1960 US West Coast Championship, George Asdel and Stan Hall took first and second, respectively, in their Cherokee IIs. Ray Proenneke flew in many US west coast meets and contests in the early 1960s and won the Torrey Pines meet in 1964. Bud Brown flew several regional contests in the US midwest in the late 1960s, placing 7th, winning the handicap trophy, in the Wright Memorial Meet of 1967. In the 1968 Region 6 Contest Bud flew to 11th overall, but once again won the handicap trophy. In 1967, Peter Newgard flew his Cherokee to first place in the 25:1 glide ratio and under category at the US Region 11 contest. Carl Herold won the 1976 US Region 11 Sports Class contest in a borrowed Cherokee II. In the 1978 US Region 4 Sports Class contest, Ted Garnett came in first in his Cherokee II. Dean Gradwell placed 5th in the US Region 11 Sports Class in 1983, winning one day's competition. Tony Condon placed 3rd in the 2011 US Region 10 Soaring Championships flying his Cherokee II, winning two days. In 2012, Condon flew his Cherokee to a 7th-place finish in the US 13.5 Meter Super Regionals.

In March 2011 there were at least two Cherokee IIs in airworthy condition, one in the USA and another in Australia. The original Cherokee RM, built by Ree and Miller, had recently been flown after an extensive restoration. At least three Cherokee IIs were currently undergoing restoration, two in the US and one in Australia.

== Variants ==
Cherokee II
Original design with a 40 ft (12.2 m) wingspan. About 100 built in the USA, Canada and Australia.
Cherokee RM
Modified version, designed by Terry Miller and John Ree, first flown in 1966 with a 44 ft (13.4 m) wingspan. The wing has an increased aspect ratio of 16.4:1, producing a wing area of 7 sq ft (0.65 m^{2}) less and a wing loading 1 lb per sq ft higher. The wing uses a NACA 63(3)-618 laminar flow airfoil and achieves a glide ratio of 28:1. About 6 were built.
Cook LEC-1 Modified Cherokee
Built as a stock Cherokee II by Larry Cook of Hershey, Pennsylvania the aircraft was damaged and rebuilt with the wing from a Miller Tern, giving it a wingspan of 47.3 ft (14.4 m). The aircraft was later further modified by later owners adding 6 ft (1.8 m) span spoilers on the upper wing surfaces, removing the dorsal fin, increasing the fin chord, as well as adding flaps and small rear windows. The aircraft is listed by the FAA as having been built in 1966 and destroyed in 2002.
Leonard Annebula
Version with a 49.21 ft (15.00 m) wingspan, Prue-style trailing edge airbrakes and glide ratio of 31:1. One was completed in 1967.
Jobagy Bagyjo
Version built by John Jobagy and completed in 1962. It featured a Briegleb BG-12 fuselage and empennage with Cherokee II wings.

== Aircraft on display ==
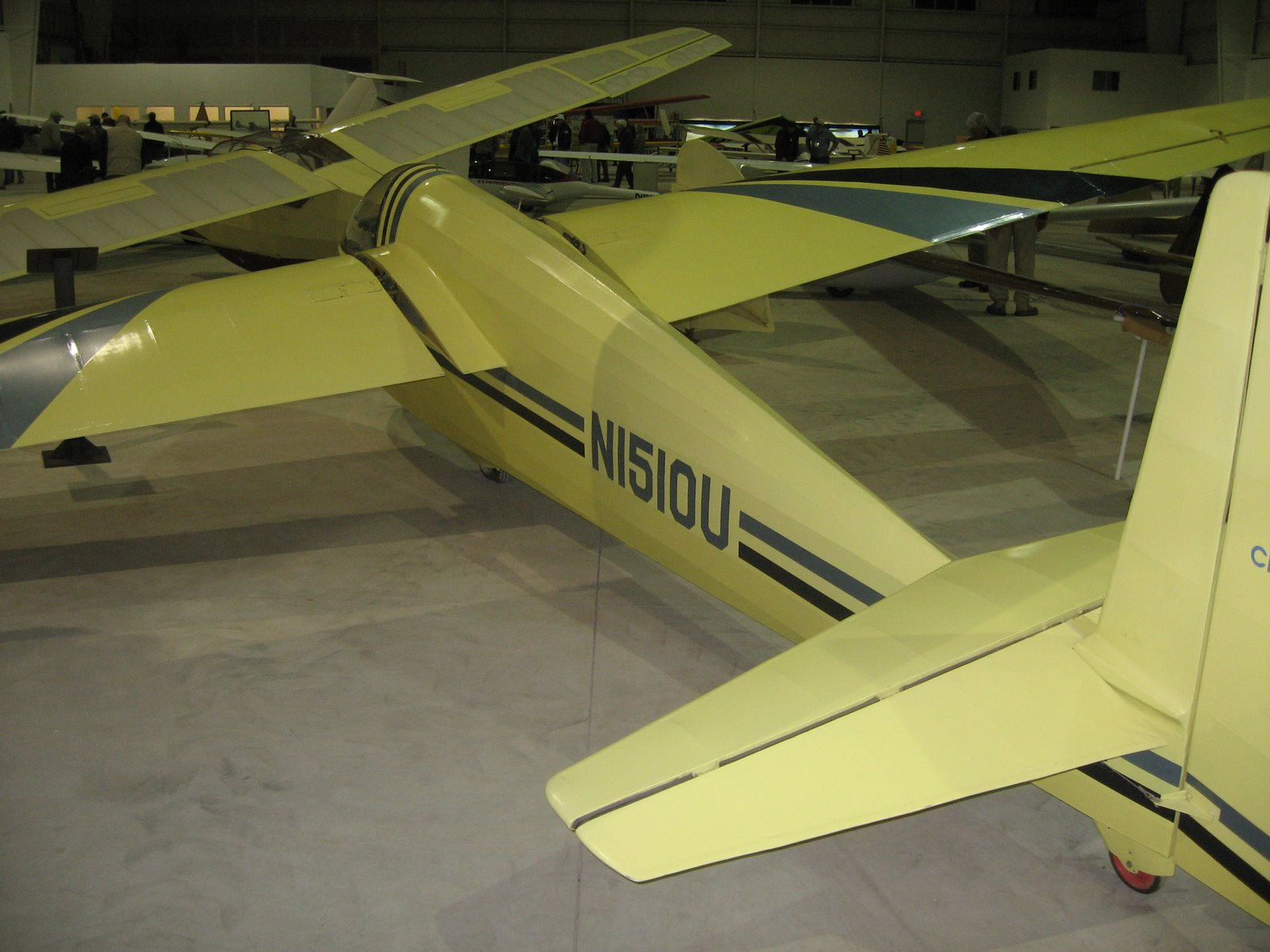
Cherokee II on display at the Southwest Soaring Museum

- Aero Space Museum of Calgary - Jobagy Bagyjo
- Classic Flyers Museum - Cherokee II
- Dakota Territory Air Museum - Cherokee II, currently in storage
- Iowa Aviation Museum - Cherokee II
- National Soaring Museum - Cherokee RM, currently in storage
- Southwest Soaring Museum - Cherokee II and Cherokee RM
- Wings of History Museum - Cherokee II, currently in storage
- Airpower Museum - Cherokee II, to be restored to flying condition

== Specifications (Cherokee II) ==
Data from Sailplane Directory and Soaring

General characteristics

- Crew: one
- Wingspan: 40 ft 0 in (12.19 m)
- Wing area: 125 sq ft (11.6 m^{2})
- Aspect ratio: 12.8
- Airfoil: Gö 549
- Empty weight: 340 lb (154 kg)
- Gross weight: 530 lb (240 kg)

Performance

- Maximum glide ratio: 23:1 at 46 mph (74 km/h)
- Rate of sink: 162 ft/min (0.82 m/s) at 42 mph (68 km/h)
- Wing loading: 4.23 lb/sq ft (20.7 kg/m^{2})

== See also ==
- List of gliders
