= Ahrens Aircraft Corporation =

1970s aircraft manufacturer in the United States

- Company type: Private
- Industry: Aerospace
- Founded: 1975
- Founder: Peter Ahrens
- Headquarters: Oxnard, California, United States

Ahrens Aircraft Corporation was an aircraft manufacturer established at Oxnard, California in 1975 to develop a STOL regional airliner and cargo aircraft, the AR 404. The firm secured a deal with the Government of Puerto Rico to assist with development costs if the aircraft could be produced there. A prototype was actually constructed in that country, and plans were underway to build a factory at Ramey, Puerto Rico, but financial backing was withdrawn and the project was abandoned.

== Aircraft ==
- 1974 Ahrens AR 124
- 1976 Ahrens AR 404
