= Leonard Annebula =

American glider

Annebula
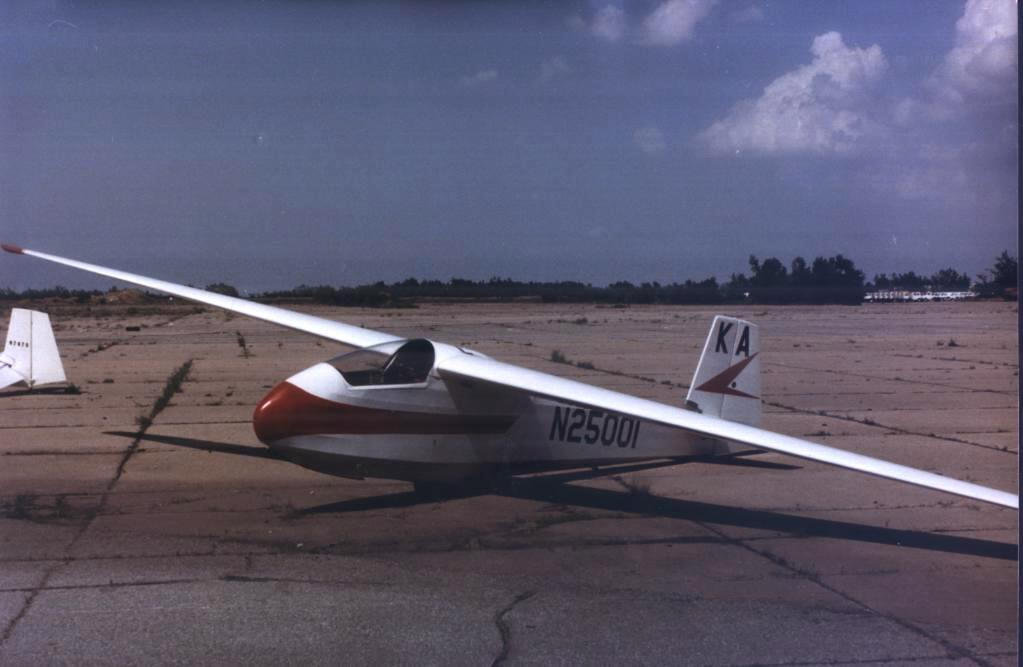

General information
- Type: Glider
- National origin: United States
- Designer: Bob Leonard
- Status: no longer in production
- Number built: One

History
- First flight: 1967
- Developed from: Hall Cherokee II

The Leonard Annebula is an American high-wing, single-seat FAI Standard Class glider designed by Bob Leonard of Wichita, Kansas, based on the Hall Cherokee II.

== Design and development ==
The Annebula design is derived from the Cherokee II, but while retaining the basic Cherokee structure, Leonard incorporated many changes and new features. The aircraft is built from wood and fiberglass, with aircraft fabric covering.

The Annebula uses a completely new single-spar 15.0 m (49.2 ft) wing with Prue-type trailing edge dive brakes. The airfoil is a NACA laminar flow type of varying section over the span, starting at the wing root as a NACA 64(3)-618, becoming a NACA 64(3)-615 by mid-span and then a NACA 4412 at the tip. The wing is constructed from plywood and fiberglass and is responsible for the Annebula's performance increase from the Cherokee II's 23:1 glide ratio to 31.5:1. The Annebula also has more span, wing loading and a higher aspect ratio than the Cherokee II.

The fuselage was also extensively redesigned, with a new shaped nose, a new vertical fin with twice the area and a new fuselage shape aft of the wing. Landing gear is a monowheel.

Only one Annebula was built.

== Operational history ==
Completed in 1967, the Annebula is registered as a US experimental amateur-built.

By 1983 the sole example had flown over 700 hours and had been used to complete Diamond badge distance and altitude flights. It also once held the Kansas state records for speed attained in 100 km (62 mi), 200 km (124 mi) and 300 km (186 mi) triangles, goal distance, altitude and altitude gain. Aside from the designer himself, Leonard's three sons have also flown the aircraft.

== Specifications (Annebula) ==
Data from Sailplane Directory and Soaring

General characteristics

- Crew: one
- Wingspan: 49 ft 3 in (15 m)
- Wing area: 121.5 sq ft (11.29 m^{2})
- Aspect ratio: 20:1
- Airfoil: Root - NACA 64(3)-618, mid-span - NACA 64(3)-615, tip - NACA 4412
- Empty weight: 502 lb (228 kg)
- Gross weight: 725 lb (329 kg)

Performance

- Maximum glide ratio: 31.5:1 at 57 mph (92 km/h)
- Rate of sink: 144 ft/min (0.73 m/s) at 50 mph (80 km/h)
- Wing loading: 5.97 lb/sq ft (29.1 kg/m^{2})

== See also ==
- List of gliders
