= GTI Mortsel =

Coordinates: 51.1773°N 4.455°E

GTI Mortsel is a vocational secondary school in Mortsel, Belgium.

== History ==
In 1960 the idea was suggested to start up a new secondary vocational school in Mortsel. The idea was realised in very primitive circumstances in the Deurnestraat in 1962, comprising the departments: sanitary installations and interior decoration. The regular student number increased rapidly with the years from 39 in 1962 to 160 in 1967 and on 1 September 1965 mister A. Boon was appointed headmaster. As Mortsel became 'a city' in 2000 the school changed name. From now on the letters GTI stood for "Gesubsidieerd Technisch Instituut" (state subsidized technical school).

== Today ==
Currently as many as 500 pupils are being taught here on a daily basis and about 80 teachers are working on two campuses: Dieseghemlei and Ijzerenweglei.
