= Green-Tweed GT-2 =

American glider

GT-2
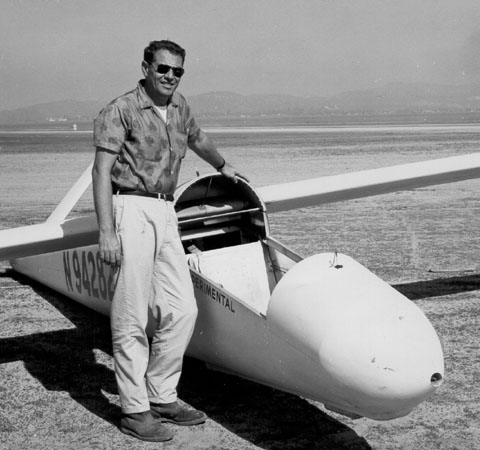
- George C. Tweed Jr. at Elsinore, California with his GT-2 sailplane

General information
- Type: Glider
- National origin: United States
- Designer: George Tweed Jr & Jack Green
- Status: Sole example destroyed in 1969
- Number built: One

History
- Introduction date: 1963

The Green-Tweed GT-2 was an American, FAI Open Class single seat glider that was designed by George Tweed Jr and Jack Green.

== Design and development ==
The GT-2 was completed in 1963 and was intended to make up the performance deficiencies in the Tweed GT-1. The GT-2 had a 60 ft (18.3 m) span wing and a V-tail.

Only one GT-2 was built and the aircraft was registered in the Experimental - Amateur-Built category.

== Operational history ==
The GT-2 was destroyed in a crash in 1969 when its ailerons became disconnected.

== Specifications (GT-2) ==
Data from Soaring

General characteristics

- Crew: One
- Wingspan: 60 ft 0 in (18.29 m)

== See also ==
Related lists

- List of gliders
