= Champion Freedom Falcon =

American motorglider

Freedom Falcon

General information
- Type: Motor glider
- National origin: United States
- Designer: Ken Champion
- Status: Production completed
- Number built: one

History
- First flight: 1982

The Champion Freedom Falcon is an American mid-wing, T-tailed, pusher configuration, single-seat motor glider that was designed and constructed by Ken Champion, first flying in 1982.

== Design and development ==
The Freedom Falcon was constructed with a wooden frame, covered with plywood and doped aircraft fabric covering. It mounts a 36 hp (27 kW) OMC Golden Phantom Wankel engine behind the cockpit, with the variable-pitch propeller above the tail boom. The 42 ft (12.8 m) span wing employs a Göttingen 549 airfoil and mounts spoilers for glidepath control.

Only one example was completed and it was registered with the US Federal Aviation Administration in the Experimental - amateur-built category. FAA records indicate that the aircraft's registration expired on 30 June 2011 and was not renewed, so it is unknown whether the aircraft still exists.

== Specifications (Freedom Falcon) ==
Data from Sailplane Directory

General characteristics

- Crew: one
- Wingspan: 42 ft 0 in (12.80 m)
- Airfoil: Göttingen 549
- Empty weight: 515 lb (234 kg)
- Powerplant: 1 × Outboard Marine Corporation Golden Phantom Wankel engine

Performance

- Maximum glide ratio: 26:1 at 48 mph (77 km/h)
- Rate of sink: 156 ft/min (0.79 m/s)

== See also ==
- List of gliders
