= Santa Maria Museum of Flight =

- Location within California
- Established: 1984
- Location: Santa Maria, California
- Coordinates: 34.9050°N 120.4547°W
- Type: Aviation museum
- Website: www.smmuseumofflight.com

The Santa Maria Museum of Flight is an aviation museum located at the Santa Maria Public Airport in Santa Maria, California.

== History ==
The origins of the museum lie in the efforts of fifteen business leaders who formed a committee in 1983 to evaluate the possibility of an aviation museum. Less than one year later, the Santa Maria Aeronautical Museum and Exhibits was chartered. The museum initially opened in 1988 as a gift shop in the Santa Maria Airport terminal building. Construction on a 6,000 sq ft (560 m^{2}) hangar began in June 1989, with plans at the time eventually calling for a 140,000 sq ft (13,000 m^{2}) facility. The museum opened to the public in July 1990.

A second hangar, built as a set for the movie The Rocketeer, was brought in from a different location at the airport and by 1994 was being renovated for use by the museum. Two years later, after the Western Spaceport Museum and Science Center failed, the Museum of Flight acquired its collection.

The museum received an F-4S on loan from the National Museum of Naval Aviation in February 2000.

The museum was engaged in fundraising to build a 7,200 sq ft (670 m^{2}) hangar in 2003.

A memorial garden for the Ninety-Nines women's pilots association was dedicated in 2012. (Note: It built upon an existing garden called the Runway of Roses.)

While the museum was closed due to the COVID-19 pandemic it added a new member of the board of directors and replaced the roof and siding on one of the hangars.

== Facilities ==
The Edward J Horkey Memorial Research Library is located in the museum's Early Aviation Hangar and holds over 4,000 books.

== Collection ==
- Douglas A-4C Skyhawk
- Fleet 2
- Hughes H-1 – replica
- Lockheed P-38 Lightning – scale replica
- McDonnell Douglas F-4S Phantom II
- Rotorway Exec 90
- Rutan Quickie
- Stinson L-5 Sentinel
- Stinson Reliant

== Events ==
The museum held an annual airshow called Thunder Over the Valley until 2015. (Note: The later Central Coast AirFest was unrelated to the museum.)
