= Bikle T-6 =

T-6

General information
- Type: Glider
- National origin: United States
- Designer: Paul Bikle
- Status: No longer in production
- Number built: 1

History
- Introduction date: 1970
- Developed from: Schreder HP-14

The Bikle T-6 is an American, mid-wing, single seat, glider designed by Paul Bikle and based upon the design of the Schreder HP-14. Even though only one T-6 was built it is noted as the most tested and studied glider with complete data published. It has been used extensively as a comparative reference glider for evaluating other designs during in-flight comparisons.

== Design and development ==
Bikle developed the all-metal T-6 during the time when he was director of the US National Aeronautics and Space Administration Dryden Flight Research Facility. He changed the design from the HP-14 by adding 15 in (38 cm) in to each wing, bringing the span to 57.0 ft (17.37 m). The flaps were shortened by 20 in (51 cm) each and the ailerons increased in span by a corresponding amount. The airfoil was altered from the stock Wortmann FX 61-163 to simplify construction, even at the cost of some measure of performance. The construction of the airframe was modified to eliminate the use of pop rivets and the structure and assembly requirements were simplified. The flap and flight control systems were also redesigned. Bikle also developed the T-tail, installing it in place of the HP-14's V-tail.

The T-6 is named for Bikle's competition number "6" and the T-tailed design of the aircraft.

== Operational history ==
Upon completion of the aircraft Bikle entered it in the 1970 US Open Class Nationals, held in El Mirage, California, in which he placed fifth. Following the competition Bikle, an aeronautical engineer by profession, conducted an extensive series of tests to measure the performance of the aircraft and then published his results in Soaring Magazine, the journal of the Soaring Society of America. As a result of its precisely-known performance, the aircraft has often been used as a comparative platform for evaluating other sailplanes in flight.

The aircraft has been removed from the Federal Aviation Administration aircraft register.

== Specifications (T-6) ==
Data from Soaring

General characteristics

- Crew: one
- Wingspan: 57 ft 0 in (17.37 m)
- Airfoil: Wortmann FX 61-163 modification
- Empty weight: 590 lb (268 kg)
- Gross weight: 810 lb (367 kg)

Performance

- Maximum glide ratio: 36.3:1 at 55.2 mph (88.8km/h)
- Rate of sink: 124.8 ft/min (0.634 m/s) at 49.5 mph (79.7 km/h)
- Wing loading: 5.68 lb/sq ft (27.7 kg/m^{2})

== See also ==
- List of gliders

Aircraft of comparable role, configuration, and era

- Parker RP9 T-Bird
