= Luenger Beta 1 =

American glider

Beta 1
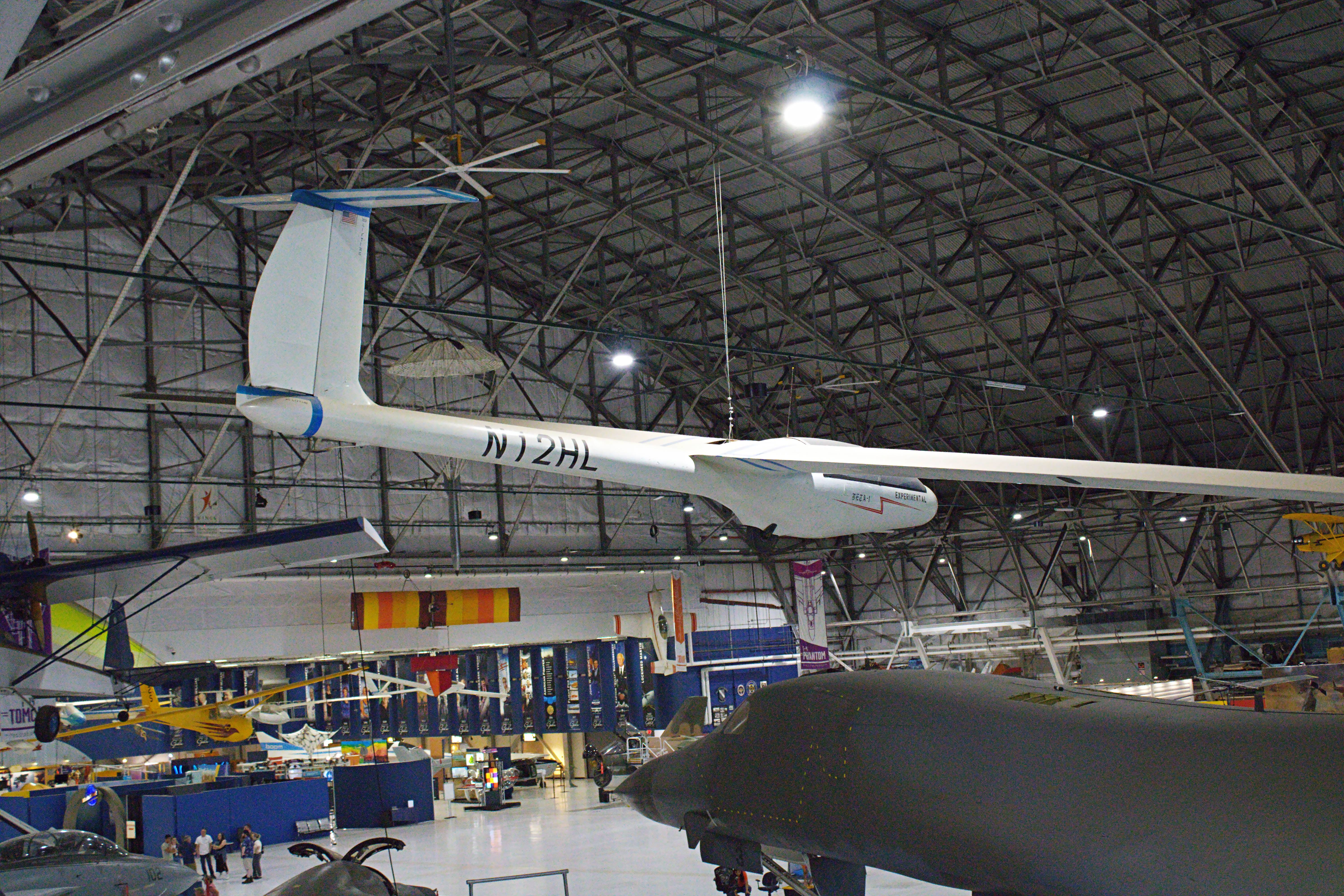
- Luenger Beta 1 on display at the Wings Over the Rockies Air and Space Museum

General information
- Type: Glider
- National origin: United States
- Designer: Hans Luenger and Spud Kohler
- Number built: One

History
- Introduction date: 1972
- First flight: 1972

The Luenger Beta 1 is an American high-wing, single-seat, T-tailed FAI Open Class glider designed by Hans Luenger and Spud Kohler.

== Design and development ==
The Beta was intended to become America's first production fiberglass sailplane. The design work was done by Luenger and Kohler in 1967 in Cleveland, Ohio. When the fuselage was completed a Federal Aviation Administration inspector informed the pair that the aircraft would not qualify to be sold as an amateur-built kit and that the design would require type certification. At that time this would have required an investment of US$250,000 and as a result Kohler withdrew from the project, leaving Luenger to complete the prototype. The prototype was registered as an amateur-built in 1972, but no further aircraft were completed.

The Beta 1 was constructed predominantly from fiberglass, with the wing covered in plywood with a .030 in (1 mm) layer of fiberglass cloth and resin over that. The wing featured terminal velocity Schempp-Hirth style dive brakes and a Wortmann FX 61-184 airfoil becoming an FX 61-160 at the tip. The fuselage was a pod-and-boom design, with fully reclined pilot seating, a fixed monowheel landing gear and T-tail.

Soaring Magazine reported in 1983 that the sole Beta 1 had been donated to the National Soaring Museum along with all its tooling, but as of May 2011 it was not listed in their collection. The aircraft's registration with the FAA was cancelled in April 2011 and it is currently displayed in the Wings Over the Rockies Air and Space Museum.

== Specifications (Beta) ==
Data from Sailplane Directory and Soaring

General characteristics

- Crew: one
- Wingspan: 55 ft 9 in (17 m)
- Wing area: 140 sq ft (13 m^{2})
- Aspect ratio: 22.3
- Airfoil: Root: Wortmann FX 61-184, Tip: FX 61-160 at the tip
- Empty weight: 690 lb (313 kg)
- Gross weight: 910 lb (413 kg)

Performance

- Maximum glide ratio: 38:1 at 58 mph (93 km/h)
- Rate of sink: 120 ft/min (0.61 m/s) at 47 mph (76 km/h)
- Wing loading: 6.06 lb/sq ft (29.6 kg/m^{2})

== See also ==
Related development

- Kohler Alpha

Related lists

- List of gliders
