= Tangent EMG-5 =

EMG-5
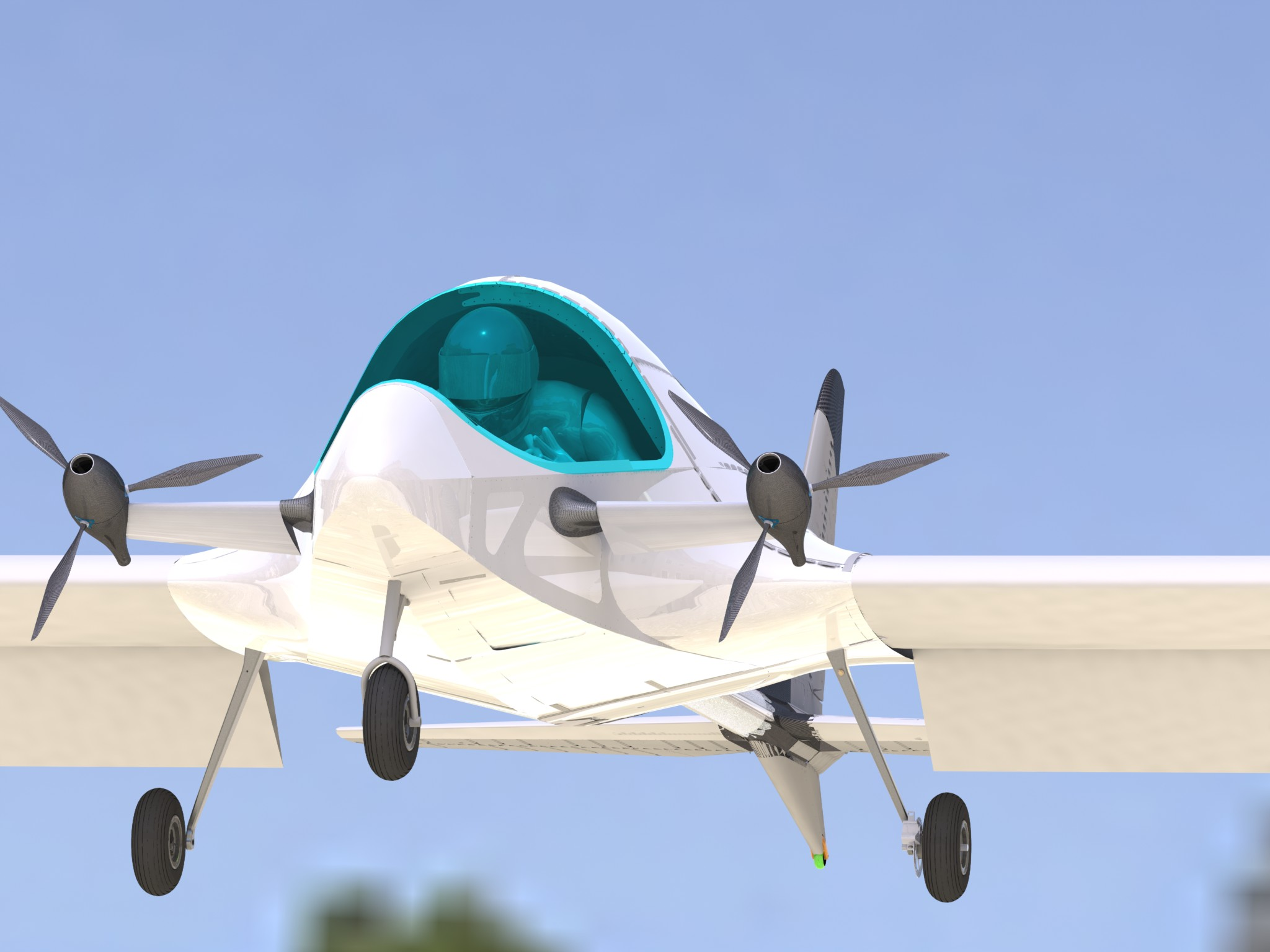
- Artist's concept

General information
- Type: Kit aircraft
- National origin: United States
- Manufacturer: Tangent Aircraft
- Designer: Brian Carpenter
- Status: under development
- Number built: None

The Tangent EMG-5 (Electric Motor Glider Model 5) is a proposed single-place electric airplane designed to be certified in the US either as an FAR Part 103 compliant ultralight (no pilot's license needed in the US), as a motor glider (glider pilot license required in the US), or as an experimental amateur built airplane (private pilot license required in the US).

== Design and development ==
The aircraft design incorporates a pilot in prone position, retractable tricycle landing gear, folding wings, ballistic recovery parachute system, and electric propulsion motors that rotate to allow limited thrust vectoring. The thrust vectoring is intended to be used in conjunction with Fowler flaps to meet the Part 103's requirement of less than 27.6 MPH stall speed. The target price for the aircraft is approximately $20,000USD.

The EMG-5 started construction before March 2012. Flight tests were anticipated to commence in Corning, California in early 2013.

The designer of the EMG-5 had based its development under the assumption that the batteries were considered part of the fuel with regard to the FAR 103 regulations and thus not included in the aircraft's maximum empty weight of 254 pounds (115 kg). As the development of the EMG-5 progressed Tangent Aircraft was spending money on research and development at an alarming rate and felt that it was very necessary to get a definitive interpretation from the FAA to ensure that their investment would not be in vain. Unfortunately, the FAA responded that "... the weight of [the] batteries must be included when determining the empty weight of the ultralight vehicle and that empty weight must not exceed 254 pounds." As a result, Tangent Aircraft significantly slowed development of the EMG-5 and began developing the EMG-6.

== Specifications ==
Data from Tangent Aircraft and EV World Interview (V_{S}, V_{NE}).

General characteristics

- Crew: one
- Length: 19 ft 6 in (5.94 m)
- Wingspan: 36 ft (11 m)
- Wing area: 105 sq ft (9.8 m^{2})
- Empty weight: 254 lb (115 kg)
- Gross weight: 550 lb (249 kg)
- Powerplant: 2 × Plettenberg Predator 37 electric motor, 16 hp (12 kW) each

Performance

- Stall speed: 22 mph (35 km/h, 19 kn) min level flight speed
- Never exceed speed: 130 mph (210 km/h, 110 kn)plus reserve
