= Parker 2nd Ranger =

American motoglider

2nd Ranger

General information
- Type: Motor glider
- National origin: United States
- Designer: W.L. Parker
- Status: Sole example on display at the Tillamook Air Museum
- Number built: one

History
- Introduction date: 1967
- First flight: 1967

The Parker 2nd Ranger, also called the Parker Ranger is an American mid-wing, single-seat motor glider that was designed and constructed by W.L. Parker of La Grande, Oregon, first flying in 1967.

== Design and development ==
Parker originally built the Ranger and equipped it with a 15 hp (11 kW) and a 31 in (79 cm) propeller that was unable to provide enough thrust to allow the aircraft to take-off. The engine was replaced with a Richter 35 hp (26 kW) powerplant which rectified this defect. The engine is retractable and mounted behind the cockpit.

The aircraft is constructed from aluminium. The 37.5 ft (11 m) wing employs a laminated aluminium spar and a NACA 4418 airfoil. The Ranger is not equipped with any glidepath control devices, such as dive brakes. The landing gear is a single centreline mainwheel plus a nose-mounted second wheel to allow taxiing.

The aircraft was registered with the Federal Aviation Administration in the Experimental - amateur-built category. Only one was built.

== Operational history ==
- Tillamook Air Museum - sole example

== Specifications (2nd Ranger) ==
Data from Sailplane Directory and Soaring

General characteristics

- Crew: one
- Wingspan: 37 ft 6 in (11.43 m)
- Aspect ratio: 12:1
- Airfoil: NACA 4418
- Empty weight: 580 lb (263 kg)
- Gross weight: 780 lb (354 kg)
- Powerplant: 1 × Righter , 35 hp (26 kW)

Performance

- Maximum glide ratio: 18:1 approximately
- Wing loading: 6.5 lb/sq ft (32 kg/m^{2})

== See also ==
- List of gliders
