= Schreder Airmate HP-11 =

US single-seat glider, 1962

HP-11
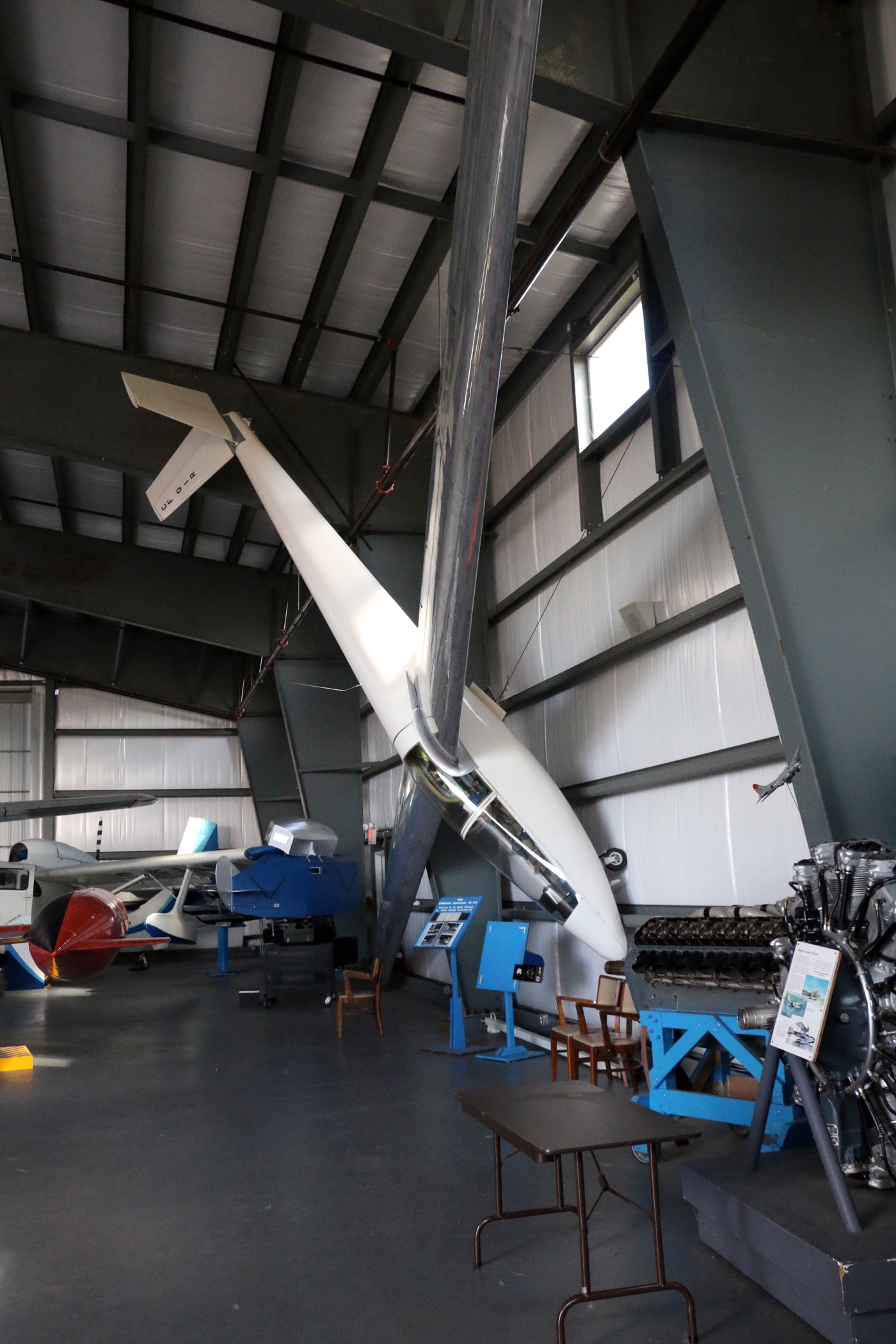
- A Schreder HP-11 at the British Columbia Air Museum Victoria

General information
- Type: Glider
- National origin: United States
- Designer: Richard Schreder
- Status: Production completed
- Number built: 42

History
- Manufactured: 1962-66
- Introduction date: 1962
- First flight: 1962
- Variants: Bowlus BZ-1; Kohler Alpha

The Schreder Airmate HP-11 is an American mid-wing, V-tailed, single seat glider designed by Richard Schreder. Airmate was the name of Schreder's design company.

== Design and development ==
The HP-11 (HP stands for high performance) was designed to compete in the FAI Open Class in the 1962 US Nationals and represented the designer's continued pursuit of the perfect competition sailplane.

The HP-11 is an all-metal design, with a wing that features a 26:1 aspect ratio, a 52 ft (15.8 m) wingspan and a NACA 65 (3)-618 airfoil, the same airfoil that had been used on the HP-8 and HP-10.

A total of 42 HP-11s were built from kits and plans before production was ended in favour of the Schreder HP-14.

== Operational history ==
Flying the HP-11 in the 1962 US Nationals, Schreder came in third in the competition and had the longest flight, 469 mi (755 km). Schreder also flew it to third place in the Open Class at the 1963 World Gliding Championships held at Junín, Buenos Aires Province, Argentina. At that event Schreder flew a 382 mi (615 km) flight.

In April 2011 there were 28 HP-11s registered with the US Federal Aviation Administration and three with Transport Canada.

== Variants ==
HP-11
Initial model, with fixed monowheel landing gear.
HP-11A
Improved model for amateur construction from plans or kits, with a retractable monowheel landing gear.
Bowlus BZ-1
Version designed by Michael Bowlus with the front fuselage from a North American F-86 Sabre drop tank, the tail from an HP-18 and the wings from an HP-11. The wingspan was reduced to 15 m (49.2 ft).
Kohler Alpha
Version with a newly designed fuselage and HP-11 wings.

== Aircraft on display ==
- National Soaring Museum - HP-11A
- US Southwest Soaring Museum - HP-11
- Chico Air Museum - HP-11A

== Specifications ==
Data from Sailplane Directory and Soaring

General characteristics

- Crew: one
- Wingspan: 52 ft 0 in (15.85 m)
- Wing area: 104 sq ft (9.7 m^{2})
- Aspect ratio: 26:1
- Airfoil: NACA 65 (3)-618
- Empty weight: 400 lb (181 kg)
- Gross weight: 650 lb (295 kg)

Performance

- Maximum glide ratio: 37:1 at 55 mph (89 km/h)
- Rate of sink: 108 ft/min (0.55 m/s) at 50 mph (80 km/h)
- Wing loading: 6.25 lb/sq ft (30.5 kg/m^{2})

== See also ==
- List of gliders
