= Freel Flying Wing =

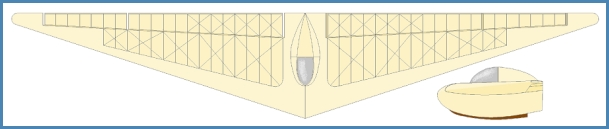

General information
- Type: Tail-less glider
- National origin: United States
- Designer: Charles Lewis Freel
- Number built: 1

History
- First flight: 1937

The Freel Flying Wing was an experimental glider designed and built in the United States during the 1930s.

== Design and development ==
The Freel Flying Wing was the creation of Charles Lewis Freel (b. 1916). As a student of San Diego High School, in San Diego, California, Freel learned about aerodynamics under the instruction of LeTain Kittredge, in the aircraft rigging/woodshop class.

Before his graduation, Freel designed a 36-inch experimental free flight model of a flying wing glider. The model flew well enough to justify moving to a full size piloted glider.

In 1933, construction was begun at the San Diego High School woodshop, on a 52-foot span flying wing glider. It was completed in 1937 and licensed with identification mark 18131. Elevons were mounted on the trailing surface and were controlled via a unique worm drive. Several flights were made by Kittredge and Freel over hillsides near San Diego. The glider suffered from poor directional control in flight.

After graduation, Freel worked for Consolidated Aircraft Corporation and held the title of "junior engineer."

== Specifications ==
Data from J2mcL Planeurs and TWITT

General characteristics

- Crew: 1
- Wingspan: 52 ft (16 m)
- Wing area: 270 sq ft (25 m^{2})
- Aspect ratio: 3.2
- Airfoil: NACA M-6
- Empty weight: 280 lb (127 kg)

Performance

- Wing loading: 1.7 lb/sq ft (8.3 kg/m^{2})
