= Bowlus BZ-1 =

American glider

BZ-1

General information
- Type: Glider
- National origin: United States
- Designer: Michael Bowlus
- Number built: One

History
- Introduction date: 1983
- First flight: September 13, 1984

The Bowlus BZ-1 is an American single seat FAI 15 Meter Class, V-tailed glider that was designed and built by Michael Bowlus.

== Design and development ==
The BZ-1 started as a design by Clark Frazier of Bluffton, Ohio in 1967. He started construction of a glider fuselage from the drop tank of a North American F-86 Sabre and called it the Zeus II. Frazier never completed the project and it was subsequently purchased by Michael Bowlus of Worthington, Ohio. Bowlus constructed wings for the re-designated BZ-1, starting with the wing design of the Schreder Airmate HP-11, but shortened to 15 m (49.2 ft). The wing incorporates ailerons hinged at the bottom and a NACA 65 (3)-618 laminar flow airfoil. The interconnected flaps and ailerons are all undercambered and assembled using the same bonded construction technique used on the Schreder HP-18. The flaps extend to 90° for landing.

The BZ-1 has a retractable monowheel landing gear, a V-tail and was built from aluminium. At the time of its completion in 1983 the designer intended to add water ballast tanks to allow the carriage of 115 lb (52.2 kg) of water. The BZ-1 had its first flight on September 13, 1984.

The aircraft was reported as complete and ready for first flight in 1983, but in May 2011, it was no longer on the Federal Aviation Administration registry.

== Specifications (BZ-1) ==
Data from Sailplane Directory and Soaring

General characteristics

- Crew: one
- Wingspan: 49 ft 3 in (15 m)
- Wing area: 102 sq ft (9.5 m^{2})
- Aspect ratio: 23.7
- Airfoil: NACA 65(3)-618
- Empty weight: 480 lb (218 kg)
- Gross weight: 700 lb (318 kg)

Performance

- Maximum glide ratio: 37:1 (projected) at 55 mph (89 km/h)
- Rate of sink: 120 ft/min (0.61 m/s) (projected) at 50 mph (80 km/h)

== See also ==
- List of gliders
