= Miller Tern =

American glider

Tern

General information
- Type: Glider
- National origin: United States
- Designer: William Terrance Miller
- Status: Plans no longer available
- Number built: at least 36

History
- First flight: 1965

The Miller Tern is an American single-seat, high wing glider designed by William Terrance Miller and offered as plans for amateur construction.

== Design and development ==
Named for the bird, the Tern was the product of Miller's desire to design a sailplane specifically for homebuilding, providing ease of construction and good performance for its day. The first Tern was completed in 1965 and at least 36 more were completed in the US, Canada and other countries. Plans are no longer available.

The Tern is constructed from a combination of wood and fiberglass. It has a fixed monowheel landing gear, dive brakes and an optional tail-mounted drag chute. The cantilever wing uses a Wortmann 61 series airfoil. The basic Tern has a 51 ft (15.5 m) wingspan that gives a glide ratio of 34:1 at 58 mph (93 km/h), while the longer span Tern II, with its 55 ft (16.8 m) wingspan, has a glide ratio several points higher.

== Operational history ==
In March 2011 there were 14 Terns on the Federal Aviation Administration register, including 4 Tern IIs and one Tern 17M. All Terns are registered in the US as Experimental - Amateur-built

In March 2011 there were two Terns registered with Transport Canada, both amateur-builts.

== Variants ==
Tern
Initial version with a 51 ft (15.5 m) wingspan and a glide ratio of 34:1 at 58 mph (93 km/h)
Tern II
Improved version with a 55 ft (16.8 m) wingspan, retractable landing gear, trailing edge airbrakes, and a reported 40:1 glide ratio. Gross weight of 852 lbs. Modifications designed and built by John and William Ree, who also collaborated with Miller on the Cherokee RM. First flown in 1968. Destroyed in unrecoverable spin in 1970.
Tern 17M
Version with a 17 m (56 ft) wingspan, one built

== Aircraft on display ==
- National Soaring Museum - 1

== Specifications (Tern) ==
Data from Sailplane Directory and Soaring

General characteristics

- Crew: one
- Wingspan: 51 ft (16 m)
- Wing area: 130 sq ft (12 m^{2})
- Airfoil: Wortmann 61 series
- Empty weight: 475 lb (215 kg)
- Gross weight: 700 lb (318 kg)

Performance

- Maximum glide ratio: 34:1 at 58 mph (93 km/h)
- Rate of sink: 126 ft/min (0.64 m/s) at 47 mph (76 km/h)
- Wing loading: 5.4 lb/sq ft (26 kg/m^{2})

== See also ==
- List of gliders
