= Adventure Aircraft EMG-6 =

EMG-6
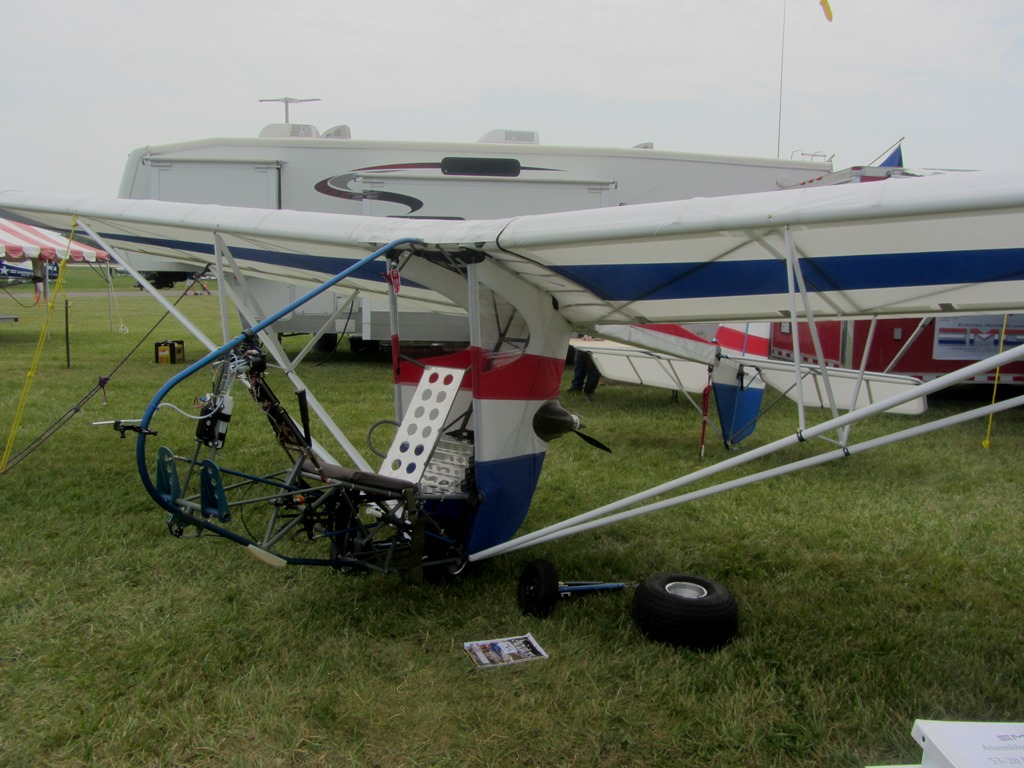
- EMG-6

General information
- Type: Kit aircraft
- National origin: United States
- Manufacturer: Adventure Aircraft Inc
- Designer: Brian Carpenter
- Status: unknown
- Number built: 3

History
- First flight: Dec 20, 2013

The Adventure Aircraft EMG-6, (Electric Motor Glider Model 6), is a proposed one or two-seat electric airplane designed to be reconfigurable for operation as either a glider or a powered motor glider.

== Design and development ==
The EMG-6 began development in March 2013 from the lessons learned on the EMG-5 after the FAA's response to the manufacturer's (then Tangent Aircraft; now Adventure Aircraft) request for clarification on battery weight and the maximum ultralight empty weight specified in FAR 103. The EMG-6 was announced at a press conference during Airventure 2013.

The EMG-6 seats up to two occupants in tandem, has folding wings, and is designed to be operated either as a glider or as an electric motor glider with propulsion options of either two wing-mounted tractor configuration motor/propeller units or two wing-mounted tractor motor/propeller units and a third fuselage mounted pusher motor/propeller unit. The EMG-6 also incorporates a ballistic parachute and provisions for being towed aloft by a tow plane. Initial flight testing in late 2013/early 2014 has used a four-wheeler and different types of automobile to tow the glider aloft. A Polini 250cc two-stroke internal combustion engine prototype was also tested.

In April 2013, Adventure Aircraft (then Tangent Aircraft) announced, "We have entered into an agreement with Quicksilver Manufacturing to build the first prototype aircraft jointly. ... Quicksilver is a powerhouse aircraft manufacturing facility that if partnered with our companies have the potential to create a team that can be manufacturing aircraft in the many hundreds even within the next two years." This partnership has since dissolved.

The Rainbow Aviation website contains information on the EMG-6, including downloadable construction drawings, but no updates since late 2019.

== Specifications ==
Data from Adventure Aircraft.

General characteristics

- Crew: 1
- Capacity: 1 passengers
- Length: 19 ft 6 in (5.94 m)
- Wingspan: 37 ft (11 m)
- Height: 6 ft 8 in (2.03 m)
- Wing area: 173 sq ft (16.1 m^{2})
- Empty weight: 350 lb (159 kg)
- Gross weight: 750 lb (340 kg)
- Powerplant: 2 × Plettenberg Predator 37 electric motor, 16 hp (12 kW) each

Performancemin level flight speedplus reserve
