= Kohler Alpha =

American rglider

Alpha
- Kohler Alpha

General information
- Type: Glider
- National origin: United States
- Designer: Spud Kohler
- Number built: One

History
- Introduction date: 1965
- First flight: 1965
- Developed from: Schreder Airmate HP-11

The Kohler Alpha is an American, mid-wing, V-tailed, FAI Open Class single seat glider that was designed and built by Spud Kohler of Cleveland, Ohio.

== Design and development ==
Kohler built the Alpha in 1965 as a development of the Schreder Airmate HP-11. He used the wings from the HP-11 and combined this with a newly designed fuselage and tail. Kohler expressed the opinion that a sailplane's performance is mostly determined by its wing, while the fuselage imparts character to the design. The fuselage that he designed must have contributed to the performance, though, as the Alpha has a glide ratio two points higher than the HP-11 with the same wing.

The Alpha fuselage is made from wood, with some fiberglass components incorporated. The fuselage uses a circular cross-section from nose to tail, with the diameter varying from the 12 in (30 cm) diameter at the tail to a 24 in (61 cm) diameter at the cockpit. The HP-11 wing is of all-metal and features a 26:1 aspect ratio, a 52 ft (15.8 m) wingspan and a NACA 65 (3)-618 airfoil. The v-tail is removable by first removing the tailcone and then withdrawing two pins. The controls are adapted from a Piper PA-24 Comanche. The landing gear is a retractable monowheel and a tail skid. The tail skid was later replaced with a tail wheel.

== Operational history ==
The Alpha had a number of owners and, according to Federal Aviation Administration registry records was most recently transferred to the Jimmy Doolittle Air & Space Museum at Travis Air Force Base, in Solano County, California. The museum does not currently indicate the aircraft is part of their collection, nor is it on display.

== Specifications (Alpha) ==
Data from Sailplane Directory and Soaring

General characteristics

- Crew: one
- Wingspan: 52 ft 0 in (15.85 m)
- Wing area: 104 sq ft (9.7 m^{2})
- Aspect ratio: 26:1
- Airfoil: NACA 65 (3)-618
- Empty weight: 420 lb (191 kg)
- Gross weight: 650 lb (295 kg)

Performance

- Maximum glide ratio: 39:1 at 60 mph (97 km/h)
- Rate of sink: 129 ft/min (0.66 m/s) at 55 mph (89 km/h)
- Wing loading: 6.25 lb/sq ft (30.5 kg/m^{2})

== See also ==
Related development

- Luenger Beta 1

Related lists

- List of gliders
