= Bennett-Carter CBS-1 Dottie S =

American glider

CBS-1 Dottie S

General information
- Type: Glider
- National origin: United States
- Designer: George Bennett and Richard Carter
- Status: Production completed
- Number built: One

History
- Introduction date: 1958
- First flight: 1958

The Bennett-Carter CBS-1 Dottie S is an American high-wing, strut-braced single-seat glider that was designed by George Bennett and Richard Carter and first flown in 1958.

== Design and development ==
The CBS-1 was commenced as a high school project by Bennett and Carter. They worked on it at Mississippi State College and completed construction in 1957 at Mississippi State University, with assistance from Guy Storer, who was head of the Raspet Flight Research Center at that time. The designation of "CBS-1" indicates "Carter-Bennett-Storer". The aircraft was first registered with the Federal Aviation Administration in 1958. Bennett went on to head the Aerophysics Department at MSU by the early 1980s.

The aircraft is constructed with a steel tube fuselage, wooden wings and tail surfaces, all covered in doped aircraft fabric. The wing is supported by a single strut. The wing design was based on the Schultz-Midwest MU-1 wings, but with a greater wingspan, employing a NACA 4415 airfoil. The tailplane was based on that of the Laister-Kaufmann LK-10A, while the fin and rudder shapes were scaled down from the Schweizer SGS 2-12. The CBS-1 has no spoilers or other glide path control device.

The landing gear was originally a take-off dolly and the aircraft landed on a fixed skid. This was later replaced with a fixed monowheel.

== Operational history ==
In May 2011 the sole CBS-1 completed was still on the FAA registry and based in Hoboken, Georgia.

== Specifications (CBS-1) ==
Data from Sailplane Directory and Soaring

General characteristics

- Crew: one
- Wingspan: 50 ft (15 m)
- Wing area: 150 sq ft (14 m^{2})
- Aspect ratio: 16.6
- Airfoil: NACA 4415
- Empty weight: 400 lb (181 kg)
- Gross weight: 600 lb (272 kg)

Performance

- Maximum glide ratio: 24:1 at 45 mph (72 km/h)
- Wing loading: 4 lb/sq ft (20 kg/m^{2})

== See also ==
Related lists

- List of gliders
