= Kennedy K-W =

American glider

K-W
- Kennedy K-W

General information
- Type: Glider
- National origin: United States
- Designer: Harold Kennedy
- Status: Prototype destroyed
- Number built: At least two

History
- Introduction date: 1957
- First flight: 1957
- Developed from: Aeronca Chief

The Kennedy K-W is an American high-wing, strut-braced, single-seat glider that was designed by Harold Kennedy of Dodge City, Kansas, with assistance from Floyd Watson. The aircraft is notable for being assembled from certified powered aircraft components and also for having had an in-flight break-up.

== Design and development ==
The K-W glider was assembled from a collection of certified fixed-wing aircraft parts. The aft fuselage was from an Aeronca Chief, with the welded steel tubing structure narrowed from a two seats in side-by-side seating configuration to a single seat width. The vertical fin from the Chief was retained. The tailplane was from a Taylorcraft, reduced in span to 8 ft (2.4 m) to allow road transportation on a trailer. The single monowheel landing gear, wings and V-struts were taken from an Aeronca K. The wings were modified to add spoilers.

Because of its component parts heritage, the aircraft had a steel tube fuselage and wooden wings, all covered in doped aircraft fabric covering.

A second aircraft was constructed along the same lines by Bob Dart of Mayville, New York and called the Aero-5. This aircraft still existed in May 2011.

== Operational history ==
The K-W prototype was completed and flown in 1957 and accumulated 390 hours, the majority of which had been flown by Kennedy's two teenaged sons.

The K-W was being flown by a 27-year-old private pilot with 56 hours total time and four hours on type, on 10 August 1975 from the Fowler Airport located near Fowler, Kansas. The glider was being launched by aerotow and when the glider attempted to release the tow rope the righthand wing struts separated from the fuselage at the attachment fitting due to an overload failure. The aircraft crashed and the pilot was killed. The US National Transportation Safety Board identified the likely cause factors as that the pilot in command mishandled the flight controls and exceeded the stress limits of the aircraft. The NTSB also cited the pilot's lack of familiarity with the aircraft type. No further aircraft of the type were constructed.

== Variants ==
Kennedy K-W
Original prototype, destroyed in August 1975.
Dart Aero-5
Second aircraft built along the same lines. The fuselage was an original design, but the fin and rudder from a Taylorcraft were used, along with Aeronca wings. A later owner was reportedly constructing a new set of longer, all-metal wings for the aircraft in 1983. As of May 2011 this aircraft was still registered with the Federal Aviation Administration and based in Milo, Iowa.

== Specifications (K-W) ==
Data from Soaring

General characteristics

- Crew: one
- Wingspan: 33 ft 3 in (10.13 m)
- Wing area: 128 sq ft (11.9 m^{2})
- Aspect ratio: 8:1
- Airfoil: Clark Y
- Empty weight: 402 lb (182 kg)
- Gross weight: 622 lb (282 kg)

Performance

- Maximum glide ratio: 16:1 at 46 mph (74 km/h)
- Rate of sink: 240 ft/min (1.2 m/s) at 44 mph (71 km/h)

== See also ==
Related lists

- List of gliders
