= Trager-Bierens T-3 Alibi =

American glider

T-3 Alibi

General information
- Type: Glider
- National origin: United States
- Designer: Kempes Trager and John Bierens
- Status: Production completed
- Number built: One

History
- Introduction date: 1951

The Trager-Bierens T-3 Alibi is an American high-wing, V-tailed, single seat glider that was designed and constructed by Kempes Trager and John Bierens.

== Design and development ==
The T-3 project was commenced in 1949, with the aircraft completed in 1951. The design aim was to produce a performance sailplane without having to build one from scratch. To achieve this goal the wings from a Laister-Kauffmann LK-10 were used.

Using the wood and fabric LK-10 wings, Trager and Bierens built a new-design fuselage from aluminium. The fuselage included a V-tail and a retractable monowheel landing gear. Later the wing was rebuilt to a new design that used the original spar. A new tail was also built at this time. The designers spent a lot of effort getting the wing surface smooth, which paid off later in contest results. The 50 ft (15.2 m) span wing employs a NACA 4418 airfoil at the wing root and a NACA 4409 at the wing tip.

Only one T-3 was built. Originally registered as N909D, the registration was later changed to N9098. The aircraft is in the Experimental - Amateur-built category.

== Operational history ==
The T-3 was entered in the 1955 US Nationals, flown by Kempes and came in first in that contest. The aircraft was crashed in August 1970 and then rebuilt by Fred Daams. The aircraft was then owned by a syndicate called Alibi Flyers which remained the registered owners in June 2011.

== Specifications (T-3) ==
Data from Sailplane Directory and Soaring

General characteristics

- Crew: one
- Wingspan: 50 ft 0 in (15.24 m)
- Wing area: 140 sq ft (13 m^{2})
- Aspect ratio: 17:1
- Airfoil: root: NACA 4418, tip: NACA 4409
- Empty weight: 500 lb (227 kg)
- Gross weight: 750 lb (340 kg)

Performance

- Maximum glide ratio: 28 at 48 mph (77 km/h)
- Rate of sink: 132 ft/min (0.67 m/s) at 44 mph (71 km/h)
- Wing loading: 5.1 lb/sq ft (25 kg/m^{2})

== See also ==
Related lists

- List of gliders
