= Schmutzhart SCH-1 =

American glider

SCH-1

General information
- Type: Glider
- National origin: United States
- Designer: Berthold Schmutzhart
- Status: No longer in production
- Primary user: Berthold Schmutzhart
- Number built: One

History
- Introduction date: 1977

The Schmutzhart SCH-1 is an American high-wing, single-seat, T-tailed glider that was designed and built by Berthold Schmutzhart.

== Design and development ==
Schmutzhart had already built one glider when he lived in his native Austria. When he moved to the United States in 1958 he decided to design and build a new glider, but was constrained by the dimensions of his small Washington, DC townhouse. As a result, he built a small aircraft that still achieved good performance for its size.

The SCH-1 has a 44 ft (13.4 m) wingspan and employs a Nickel 17% airfoil, with flaps for glidepath control. The flaps can be set to 0, +4, +45 and +70 °. The basic structure of the SCH-1 is aluminium with some fiberglass fairings. The leading edge wing ribs are made from dense Styrofoam cut with a bandsaw, with the ribs aft of the spar fabricated from cold-formed sheet aluminum. The fuselage was constructed by bending the outside skin onto a jig and then riveting the bulkheads and stringers to the skin from the inside. The wings were built in a similar manner in a jig that held the wing skins, with the ribs then fitted to the skins. Schmutzhart says that the wing skins were formed by being "pressed between the floor, a long board, two lawyers, one architect, a federal bureaucrat and a White House aid". The wing spar is a 6061-T6 aluminum milled I-beam, with the outer spar sections built up from bent flat aluminum stock. The aircraft was originally fitted with an all-flying tail, but this was later modified to a conventional tailplane and elevator.

The aircraft is registered with the Federal Aviation Administration in the Experimental - Amateur-Built category. Only one SCH-1 was built.

== Operational history ==
In June 2011 the SCH-1 was still registered to Schmutzhart, some 34 years after its completion.

== Specifications (SCH-1) ==
Data from Sailplane Directory and Soaring

General characteristics

- Crew: one
- Wingspan: 44 ft 0 in (13.41 m)
- Wing area: 100 sq ft (9.3 m^{2})
- Aspect ratio: 18:1
- Airfoil: Nickel 17%
- Empty weight: 398 lb (181 kg)
- Gross weight: 573 lb (260 kg)

Performance

- Maximum glide ratio: 30:1 at 50 mph (80 km/h)
- Rate of sink: 111 ft/min (0.56 m/s) at 40 mph (64 km/h)
- Wing loading: 5.73 lb/sq ft (28.0 kg/m^{2})

== See also ==
Related lists

- List of gliders
