= Kelsey K-16 =

American glider

K-16

General information
- Type: Glider
- National origin: United States
- Designer: William Frank Kelsey
- Status: Production completed
- Number built: one

History
- Introduction date: 1961
- First flight: 1961

The Kelsey K-16 is an American, strut-braced, high-wing, two-seat, glider that was designed and constructed by William Frank Kelsey of Salt Lake City, Utah.

== Design and development ==
Kelsey completed the K-16 in 1961, and first flew in that year. The aircraft has a welded steel tube fuselage and a wooden structure wing, all covered in doped aircraft fabric covering. The 48 ft (14.6 m) span wing employs a modified Göttingen airfoil. The landing gear is a center-line monowheel and a fixed skid.

Only one K-16 was built and it was registered with the US Federal Aviation Administration in the Experimental - Amateur-built and the Racing/exhibition categories.

== Operational history ==
The aircraft was flown by its designer to earn his diamond badge goal flight. Kelsey subsequently sold it to the Soaring Society of Utah, who in turn sold it in the spring of 1971 to Robert J. Leonard of Soap Lake, Washington. In the autumn of 1972 the aircraft was severely damaged by a wind storm, with both wings damaged, including one that was broken into two sections. The aircraft was rebuilt as an Experimental Aircraft Association local chapter project. In August 2011, fifty years after the aircraft was built, Leonard was still listed on the FAA registry as the owner.

== Specifications (K-16) ==
Data from Soaring

General characteristics

- Crew: one
- Capacity: one passenger
- Wingspan: 48 ft 0 in (14.63 m)
- Wing area: 175 sq ft (16.3 m^{2})
- Aspect ratio: 13:1
- Airfoil: modified Göttingen
- Empty weight: 634 lb (288 kg)
- Gross weight: 1,150 lb (522 kg)

Performance

- Maximum glide ratio: 20:1
- Rate of sink: 228 ft/min (1.16 m/s) at 45 mph (72 km/h)
- Wing loading: 6.5 lb/sq ft (32 kg/m^{2})

== See also ==
Aircraft of comparable role, configuration, and era

- Schweizer SGS 2-33

Related lists

- List of gliders
