= Aircraft Designs =

Aircraft Designs Inc
- Company type: Private company
- Industry: Aerospace
- Founded: 1976
- Defunct: 2012
- Products: Gyroplanes; Motorgliders
- Owner: Martin Hollmann

Aircraft Designs Inc was a US aircraft design and manufacturing firm founded in Monterey, California by Martin Hollmann in 1976. Apart from working on its own designs, the firm provides design and engineering analysis to other aerospace ventures.

Hollmann and his company carried out much subcontract work, particularity in his areas of expertise, including aeroelasticity and structural analysis. He also designed a number of gyroplanes.

The company was dissolved on 30 January 2012 and owner Martin Hollmann died 12 October 2012 of cancer.

== Aircraft ==
Summary of aircraft built by Aircraft Designs
| Model name | First flight | Number built | Type |
|---|---|---|---|
| ADI Sportster | 1974 | | Single-engine two-seat gyroplane plans |
| ADI Condor | 1981 | | Single-engine, twin boom, two-seat motorglider. |
| ADI Bumble Bee | 1983 | | Single-engine single-seat gyroplane |
| ADI Stallion | 1994 | | Single-engine six-seat touring light aircraft |
