= Leffler-MacFarlane LM-1 =

American glider

LM-1

General information
- Type: Glider
- National origin: United States
- Designer: Al Leffler, Walt MacFarlane and Bill Meyer
- Status: Production completed
- Number built: one

History
- First flight: November 1963

The Leffler-MacFarlane LM-1 is an American mid-wing, single-seat, FAI Open Class glider that was designed and constructed by Al Leffler, Walt MacFarlane and Bill Meyer, first flying in November 1963.

== Design and development ==
The LM-1 was built using a modified wing from a Laister-Kauffman TG-4. The wing retains its original wood and doped aircraft fabric construction, its 50 ft (15.2 m) span as well as the use of a NACA 4418 airfoil at the wing root, transitioning to a NACA 4409 at the wing tip. The newly designed fuselage is made from welded steel tube and fiberglass. The landing gear was originally a retractable dual-wheel hydraulic arrangement, that was replaced with a more conventional retractable monowheel from a Schreder HP-14.

The aircraft was registered with the US Federal Aviation Administration in the Experimental - Amateur-built category. Only one was ever constructed.

In 1974 it was reported that plans were underway to create a new 56 ft (17.1 m) span wing for the LM-1, that would feature a Wortmann airfoil.

== Operational history ==
By 1974 the LM-1 had flown 12,000 mi (19,312 km) of cross country distance. In August 2011, 48 years after its first flight, the aircraft was still registered with the FAA and was owned by Bill Meyers, one of the original partners.

== Specifications (LM-1) ==
Data from Soaring

General characteristics

- Crew: one
- Wingspan: 50 ft 0 in (15.24 m)
- Wing area: 166 sq ft (15.4 m^{2})
- Aspect ratio: 15:1
- Airfoil: root: NACA 4418, tip: NACA 4409
- Empty weight: 693 lb (314 kg)
- Gross weight: 880 lb (399 kg)

Performance

- Maximum glide ratio: 30:1 at 45 mph (72 km/h)
- Rate of sink: 162 ft/min (0.82 m/s) at 43 mph (69 km/h)
- Wing loading: 5.5 lb/sq ft (27 kg/m^{2})

== See also ==
Aircraft of comparable role, configuration, and era

- Schweizer SGS 1-23

Related lists

- List of gliders
