= Explorer PG-1 Aqua Glider =

American glider

PG-1 Aqua Glider

General information
- Type: Glider
- National origin: United States
- Manufacturer: Explorer Aircraft
- Designer: Bill Skiliar
- Number built: at least four

History
- Introduction date: 1959
- First flight: 1959

The Explorer PG-1 Aqua Glider is an American single seat, biplane glider that was designed by Bill Skiliar in 1959 and made available as plans for amateur construction. The prototype was built with help from a troop of Air Explorer Scouts that same year.

== Design and development ==
Skiliar was a Colonel in the USAF and an aeronautical engineer and test pilot. He designed the Aqua Glider to be towed behind a boat, taking off from the water, releasing the tow rope and then gliding to a landing on the water.

The Aqua Glider is made from wood and covered with doped aircraft fabric. The landing gear is fixed and consists of a pair of water skis. The aircraft uses spoilers instead of ailerons for roll control and features an all-flying tail and a trim system. The biplane wing employs a NACA 4412 airfoil.

The aircraft is towed behind a ski tow boat, lifting off at 35 mph (56 km/h) and climbing to about 200 ft (61 m), depending on the length of the tow rope used. The aircraft does not stall, but enters a nose-high mushing condition with a slow rate of descent.

Plans were sold for US$25 by Corben Development Corporation of Venice, Florida and completed aircraft cost about US$800 in materials in 1983.

Skiliar made several modifications to the design, experimenting with landing gear for land use made from automobile leaf springs. He also created a powered version with two McCulloch MC-70 go-cart engines mounted in the aft fuselage behind the wing spar, with the propeller above the engines on a streamlined pylon that housed the drive chains. The powered version was not successful and was returned to glider configuration.

== Operational history ==
By 1983 the prototype had flown over a thousand flights and plans had been widely sold in the United States and many other countries.

== Aircraft on display ==
- EAA AirVenture Museum – the prototype was donated to the museum in 1970

== Specifications (variant specified) ==
Data from Sailplane Directory, Soaring and EAA

General characteristics

- Crew: One
- Length: 13 ft 8 in (4.17 m)
- Wingspan: 16 ft 0 in (4.88 m)
- Wing area: 95 sq ft (8.8 m^{2})
- Aspect ratio: 5:1
- Airfoil: NACA 4412
- Empty weight: 180 lb (82 kg)
- Gross weight: 400 lb (181 kg)

Performance

- Maximum speed: 65 mph (105 km/h, 56 kn)
- Stall speed: 35 mph (56 km/h, 30 kn)
- Maximum glide ratio: 6/5:1 at 45 mph (72 km/h)
- Wing loading: 4.5 lb/sq ft (22 kg/m^{2})

== See also ==
Related lists

- List of gliders
