= ADI Condor =

Glider aircraft

Condor
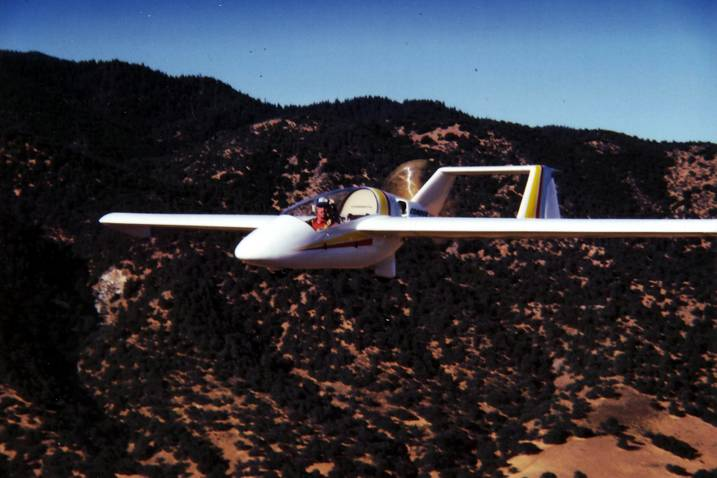

General information
- Type: Motor glider
- National origin: United States
- Manufacturer: ADI
- Number built: 1

History
- First flight: 1981

The ADI Condor was a motor glider of unusual configuration built in the United States in 1981. While most motor gliders follow traditional sailplane layout, the Condor was of twin-boom configuration, with twin, inwardly canted tail fins joined at their tips by a common horizontal stabilizer. A pusher propeller driven by a converted Volkswagen engine was mounted at the rear of the central nacelle that seated the pilot and passenger in tandem. Construction throughout was of composite materials.

The single example of the aircraft was destroyed in a crash in late 1982 after an engine failure.

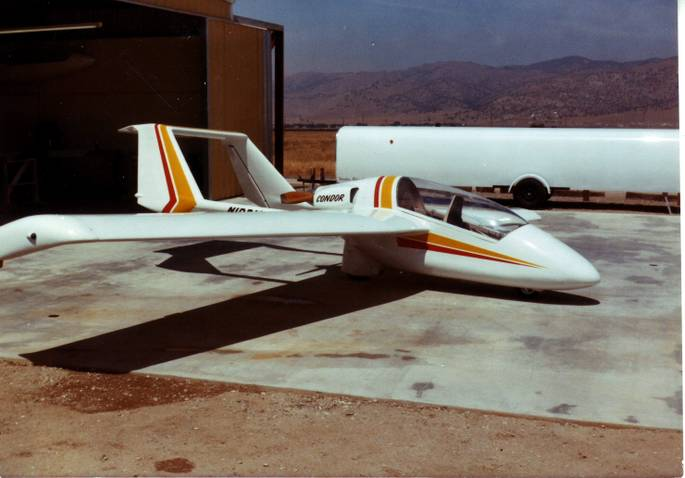
Inline landing gear with on-wingtip resting is typical of sailplanes

== Specifications ==
General characteristics

- Crew: One pilot
- Capacity: 1 passenger
- Wing area: 130 sq ft (12.1 m^{2})
- Powerplant: 1 × converted Volkswagen automotive engine , 65 hp (48 kW)

Performance

- Rate of climb: 1,000 ft/min (5.1 m/s)
