= Hutchinson HS-127 =

American glider

HS-127

General information
- Type: Glider
- National origin: United States
- Designer: Vernon Hutchinson
- Number built: One

History
- Introduction date: 1956
- First flight: 1956

The Hutchinson HS-127 is an American mid-wing glider that was designed and built by Vernon Hutchinson.

== Design and development ==
The HS-127 was designed and built by Hutchinson in 1956 as a single seat, V-tailed aircraft that incorporated spoilers mounted in the fuselage sides, above the wing roots. The aircraft was constructed from aluminium and employed a NACA 65 (3)-618 airfoil.

In 1960 Hutchinson constructed a new fuselage for the aircraft with two seats in tandem and a conventional tail. The wings from the earlier single seat fuselage were used on the new fuselage. The designer incorporated split trailing edge dive brakes and claims this was the first use of balanced trailing edge dive brakes. Both versions of the aircraft bore the same Federal Aviation Administration aircraft registration, N62P.

The aircraft's HS designation indicates Hutchinson Sailplane.

== Operational history ==
Hutchinson completed his Silver badge and Gold badge while flying the HS-127 and also flew a number of 200 mi (322 km) flights in it. In May 2011 the aircraft was still registered to Hutchinson, 55 years after its completion.

== Specifications (HS-127 two seater) ==
Data from Soaring

General characteristics

- Crew: one
- Capacity: one passenger
- Wingspan: 57 ft 0 in (17.37 m)
- Wing area: 132 sq ft (12.3 m^{2})
- Aspect ratio: 24.6:1
- Airfoil: NACA 65 (3)-618
- Empty weight: 804 lb (365 kg)
- Gross weight: 1,200 lb (544 kg)

Performance

- Maximum glide ratio: 33:1 at 67 mph (108 km/h)
- Rate of sink: 150 ft/min (0.76 m/s) at 58 mph (93 km/h)
- Wing loading: 9.1 lb/sq ft (44 kg/m^{2})

== See also ==
Related lists

- List of gliders
