= Tweed GT-1 =

American glider

GT-1
- The GT-1 with the later canopy fitted

General information
- Type: Glider
- National origin: United States
- Designer: George Tweed Jr
- Status: Production completed
- Number built: One

History
- First flight: 1960

The Tweed GT-1 is an American high-wing, FAI Open Class single seat glider that was designed by George Tweed Jr.

== Design and development ==
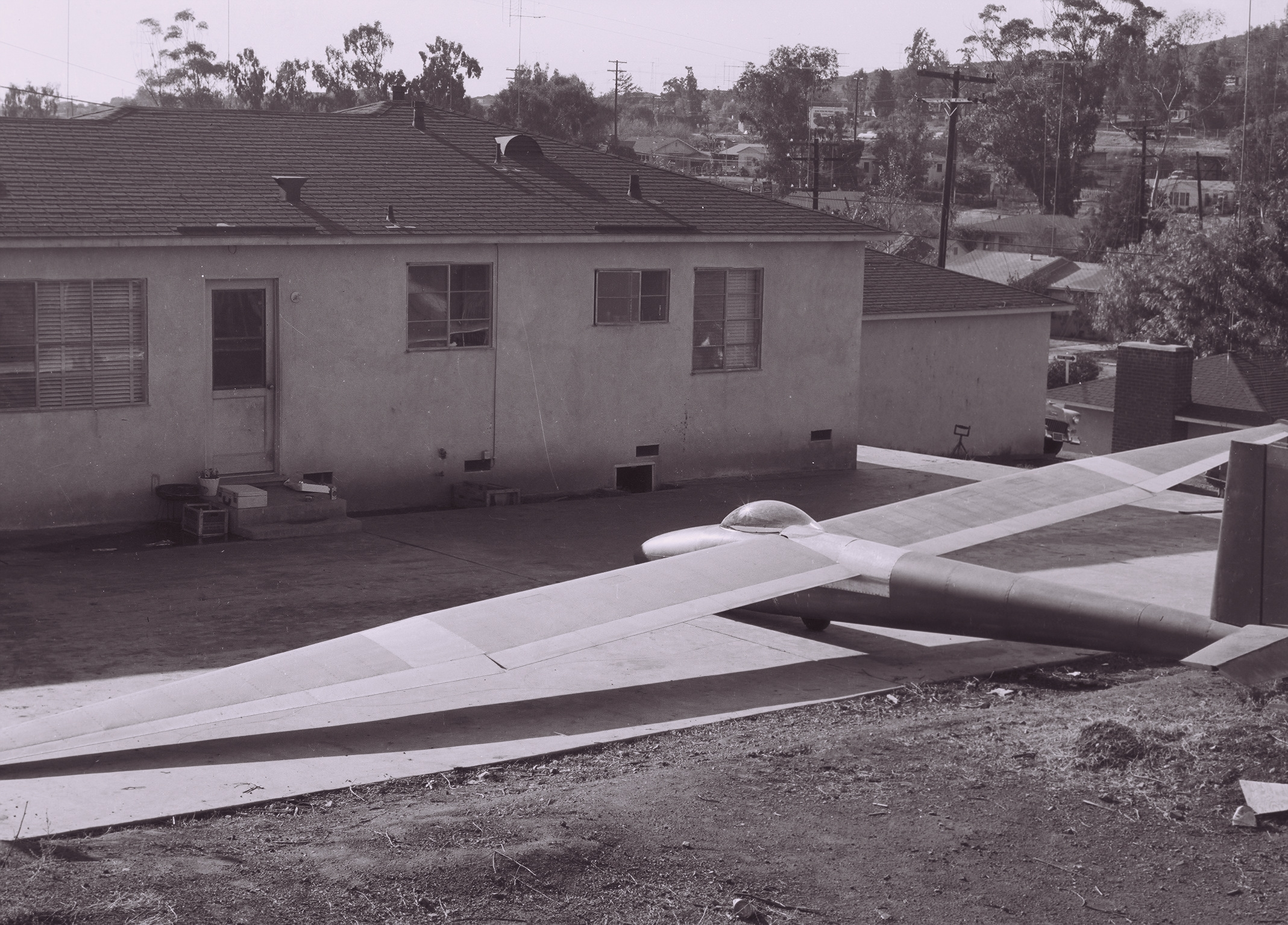
First full assembly of the GT-1 in the backyard of the house in La Mesa, California, where it was built in the garage over several years in the late 1950s. The GT-1 has the early bubble canopy in this photo.

The GT-1 was built in concert with the Whigham GW-1 as both builders shared ideas and tools. The GT-1 first flew in 1960.

The lower part of the GT-1's nose was constructed from a drop tank, with the upper part fabricated from fiberglass that was laid up using the drop tank as a mold. The landing gear is a retractable monowheel. The aircraft was initially fitted with a bubble canopy. Later, the fuselage was modified to allow a more reclined pilot seating position and the canopy replaced with a more streamlined one. The modifications added 200 lb (91 kg) to the glider's empty weight and the gross weight was raised 100 lb (45 kg) in partial compensation. The GT-1's 51 ft (15.5 m) span wing employs a NACA 43012A airfoil. The initial glide ratio was 29:1, but extensive work gap-filling and contouring the aircraft raised this to 33:1.

Only one GT-1 was built and the aircraft was registered in the Experimental - Amateur-Built category.

== Operational history ==
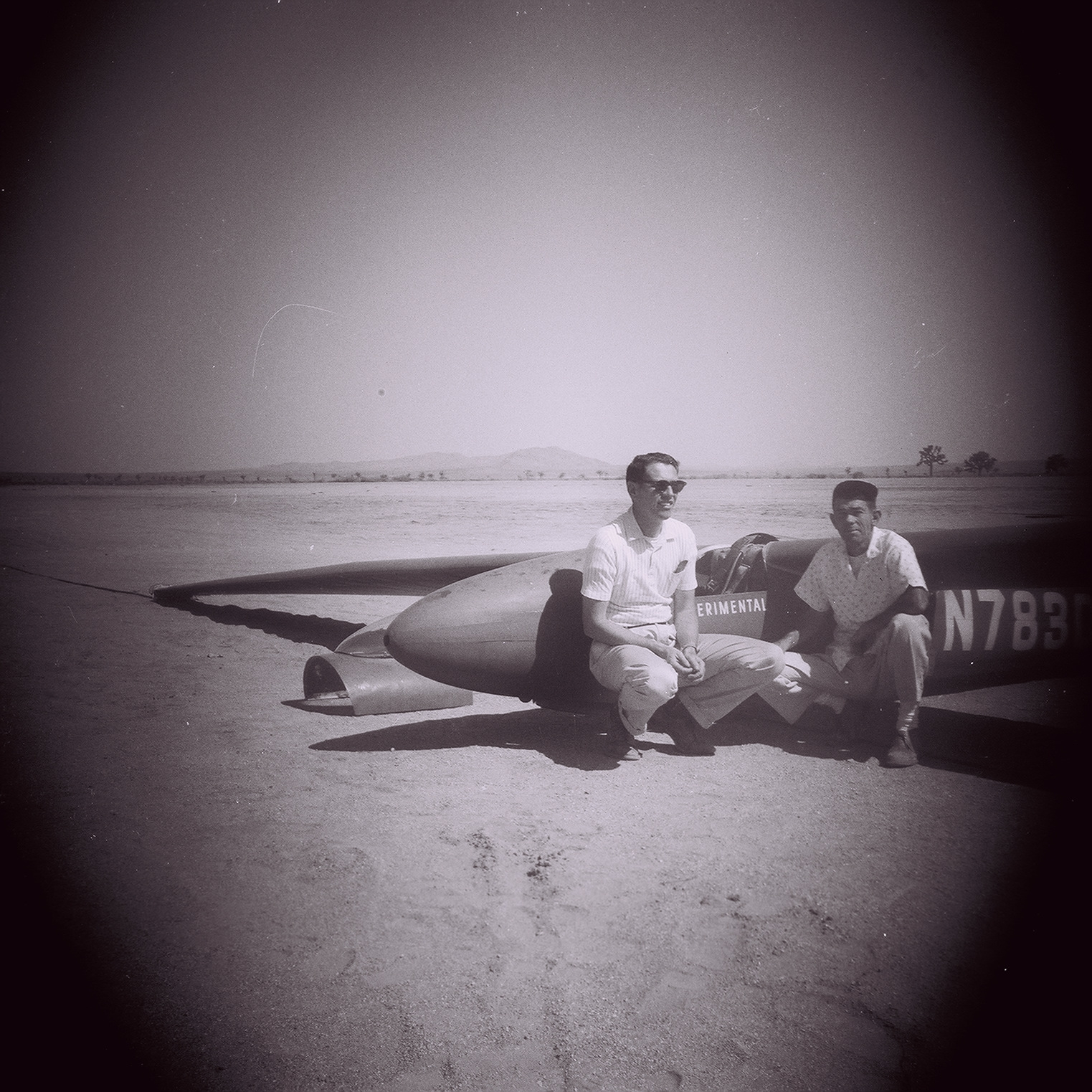
George C. Tweed Jr. with Jack Green and the GT-1 after the first flight at Elsinore, California. The early-style bubble canopy be seen on the ground.

The GT-1 was entered in the 1960 US Nationals, but, as the designer termed it, the aircraft "proved to be a victim of technical obsolescence" and it did not place well. Both the designer and Jack Green did however complete their gold badges in the glider.

By 2011 the aircraft had had its Federal Aviation Administration registry revoked and the aircraft likely no longer exists.

== Specifications (GT-1 later configuration) ==
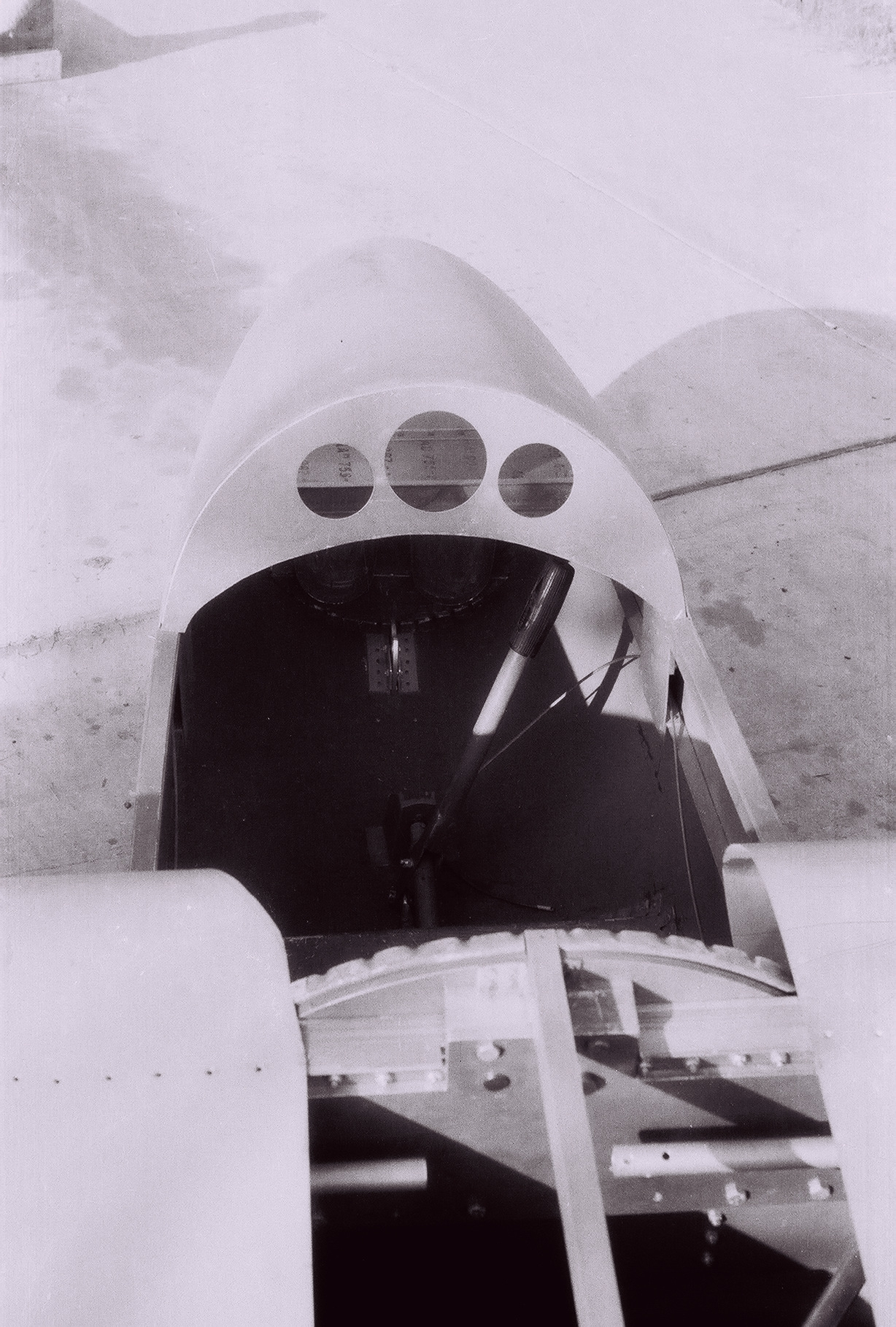
GT-1 cockpit while the aircraft was under construction.

Data from Soaring

General characteristics

- Crew: One
- Wingspan: 51 ft 0 in (15.54 m)
- Wing area: 155 sq ft (14.4 m^{2})
- Aspect ratio: 17:1
- Airfoil: NACA 43012A
- Empty weight: 683 lb (310 kg)
- Gross weight: 853 lb (387 kg)

Performance

- Maximum glide ratio: 33:1 at 55 mph (89 km/h)
- Rate of sink: 120 ft/min (0.61 m/s) at 45 mph (72 km/h)
- Wing loading: 5.5 lb/sq ft (27 kg/m^{2})

== See also ==
Related lists

- List of gliders
