= Schweizer SGU 1-6 =

SGU 1-6
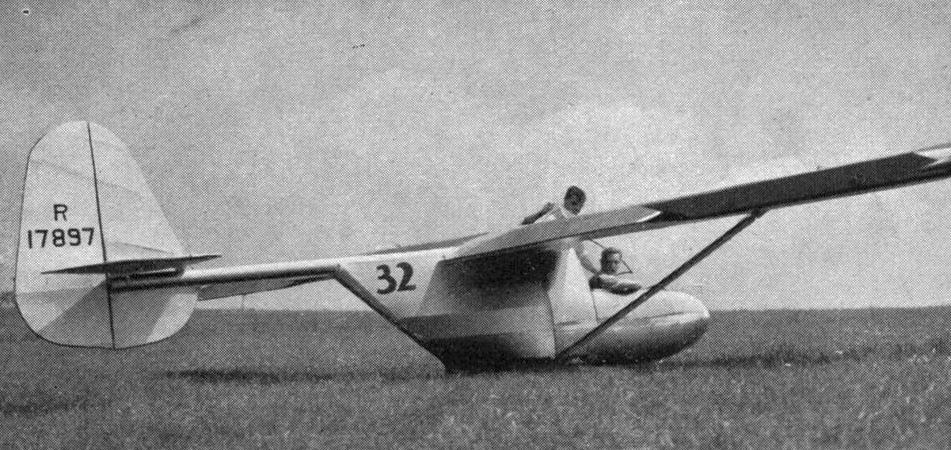

General information
- Type: Open-class sailplane
- National origin: United States
- Manufacturer: Schweizer Metal Aircraft Company
- Designer: Ernst and Paul Schweizer
- Number built: 1

History
- First flight: 1937

The Schweizer SGU 1–6 was a United States Open Class, single-seat, high-wing, pod-and-boom glider built by Schweizer Metal Aircraft Company of Elmira, New York.

The sole SGU 1–6 built was completed in 1937 as an experimental aircraft and registered N17897. The design was never certified.

== Design and development ==
Schweizer Aircraft started construction of the 1–6 prototype in 1937. The aircraft was built to compete in the Eaton Design Contest held in conjunction with the 8th US National Gliding Championships. This competition was open to any new American glider design that had not been flown at a previous National Championship. The rules required drawings and stress analysis data to be presented with the completed aircraft. The intention was that the winning design would be made available as drawings and kits for amateur construction and that Bureau of Air Commerce design approval would be eventually obtained as well.

The winners of the contest and the cash prizes won were:

- First – US$700 – ABC Sailplane, Arthur B Schultz, designer
- Second – US$500 – Ross RS-1 Zanonia Sailplane, Harland Ross, designer
- Third – US$300 – SGU 1–6 Utility Glider, Ernst and Paul Schweizer, designers

The SGU was the first all-metal glider built. It was an unusual design with a high-mounted strut-braced wing and a tube-style boom ending in a cruciform tail. The design was intended to be simple and cheap to produce.

None of the winning designs in the Eaton Contest proved to be as easy to construct as was envisioned by the contest organizers and the lessons learned from the contest lead the Schweizer brothers to start with a clean sheet design for their next effort. This new design would achieve the aims that the 1937 Eaton Contest gliders failed to make.

The subsequent Schweizer SGU 1-7 lead to the successful Schweizer SGU 1-19 which, with two seats installed, grew into the Schweizer SGU 2-22 trainer and finally the Schweizer SGS 2-33.

== Operational history ==
The SGU 1–6 was not actually flown in competition, despite being designed for the 1937 US Nationals and being present at the competition.

The Schweizer brothers were all pilots of low experience in 1937 and had hoped to have a well-known pilot fly the 1–6 in the US Nationals. Top soaring pilot Jack O'Meara was attending the competition and did not have a sailplane to fly. The Schweizers offered O'Meara the use of the 1–6 for the contest, hoping that he would score well flying it and thus promote the design.

O'Meara declined the loan of the 1–6, hoping to secure a higher performing aircraft instead, in more keeping with his status as a competitive pilot and so the 1–6 did not fly in the Nationals.

The sole SGU 1–6 built no longer exists. Its FAA registration number, N17897, now belongs, appropriately enough, to a Schweizer SGS 2-33.

== See also ==
Related lists

- List of gliders
