= H63 =

H63 or H-63 may refer to:

- H-63 KingCobra helicopter prototype
- H-63 (Michigan county highway)
- Nelson H-63 two stroke aircraft engine
- HMS Gipsy (H63), a British destroyer
