= H59 =

H59 may refer to:

- HMS Gallant (H59), a Royal Navy G-class destroyer
- Nelson H-59, an aircraft engine produced by Nelson Aircraft
- Sikorsky H-59, an American experimental helicopter
