= H44 =

H44 or H-44 may refer to:

- H-44 (Michigan county highway)
- HMS H44, a 1919 British Royal Navy H-class submarine
- HMS Highlander (H44), a World War II British Royal Navy H-class destroyer
- Nelson H-44, an aircraft engine
- H-44, the last of Nazi Germany's H-class battleship proposals
