= Gross Sky Ghost =

American glider

Sky Ghost

General information
- Type: Glider
- National origin: United States
- Designer: Frank R. Gross
- Status: Sole example in the National Soaring Museum
- Number built: one

History
- First flight: 1931

The Gross Sky Ghost is an American high-wing, strut-braced, two-seat, glider that was designed by Frank R. Gross.

== Design and development ==
Gross was a graduate of Akaflieg Darmstadt and the Sky Ghost was his third glider design after the Baker-McMillan Cadet and the Akron Condor. Gross's Sky Ghost was innovative for its era, in that it had tandem seating with dual controls. In the 1930s most glider flight training was accomplished by having a student fly short hops under supervision of an instructor on the ground.

The aircraft fuselage is made from welded steel tubing, with all surfaces covered in doped aircraft fabric covering. Its 43 ft (13.1 m) span wing is mounted above the rear seat and supported by parallel lift struts. The tail is cable-braced. The cockpit is open, without a windshield. The landing gear is a conventional arrangement for fixed wing powered aircraft, rather than the more common central monowheel used on gliders. A wooden skid is also mounted on the fuselage center line. In addition to the main landing gear the aircraft has a tail skid and wing tip skids in the form of tubular loops.

The aircraft's name was derived from its appearance in flight, which was described as "eerie", due to its matte black finish.

== Operational history ==
On at least one occasion the Sky Ghost was bungee launched from Harris Hill, New York.

The first multi-place glider flight of over two hours ever flown in the USA was completed by Gross in the Sky Ghost. It was also the first multi-place glider entered in the US Nationals, when it competed in 1932.

== Aircraft on display ==
- National Soaring Museum

== Specifications (Sky Ghost) ==
Data from Sailplane Directory

General characteristics

- Crew: one
- Capacity: one passenger
- Length: 22 ft 3 in (6.78 m)
- Wingspan: 43 ft (13 m)
- Wing area: 215 sq ft (20.0 m^{2})
- Empty weight: 310 lb (141 kg)

== See also ==
Related lists

- List of gliders
