= Perl PG-130 Penetrator =

American glider

PG-130 Penetrator

General information
- Type: Glider
- National origin: United States
- Designer: Harry Perl
- Status: Sole example in the National Soaring Museum
- Number built: One

History
- Manufactured: 1953
- First flight: 1953

The Perl PG-130 Penetrator is an American mid-wing, single-seat glider that was designed and constructed by Harry Perl.

== Design and development ==
The PG-130 was completed in 1953. The aircraft has a wooden structure, with the wings and tail covered in doped aircraft fabric covering. The 48 ft (14.6 m) span wing employs a Göttingen Gö 549 airfoil and features dive brakes. The wing has a foam-filled leading edge. The tail is an all-flying design. The aircraft originally took off from a jettisonable take-off dolly and landed on a fixed skid, but was later modified with a fixed monowheel.

The sole example of the PG-130 was registered with the US Federal Aviation Administration as an Experimental - Amateur-built.

== Operational history ==
Soaring Magazine reported in 1983 that Perl still owned the aircraft and was flying it at that time. The PG-130 was removed from the FAA register prior to 1989 and now belongs to the National Soaring Museum, where it was listed as "in storage" in June 2011.

== Aircraft on display ==
- National Soaring Museum - in storage

== Specifications (PG-130) ==
Data from Sailplane Directory, Soaring and The Incomplete Guide to Airfoil Usage

General characteristics

- Crew: one
- Wingspan: 48 ft 0 in (14.63 m)
- Wing area: 130 sq ft (12 m^{2})
- Aspect ratio: 17.75:1
- Airfoil: Göttingen Gö 549
- Empty weight: 480 lb (218 kg)
- Gross weight: 680 lb (308 kg)

Performance

- Maximum glide ratio: 33 at 52 mph (84 km/h)
- Rate of sink: 126 ft/min (0.64 m/s) at 44 mph (71 km/h)
- Wing loading: 5.23 lb/sq ft (25.5 kg/m^{2})

== See also ==
Related development

- Nelson Hummingbird PG-185B - another Perl design for Nelson Aircraft

Related lists

- List of gliders
