= National Soaring Museum =

- Established: 1969
- Location: Big Flats, New York; Elmira postal address
- Type: Aviation Museum
- Website: www.soaringmuseum.org
- Warren E. Eaton Motorless Flight Facility
- U.S. National Register of Historic Places
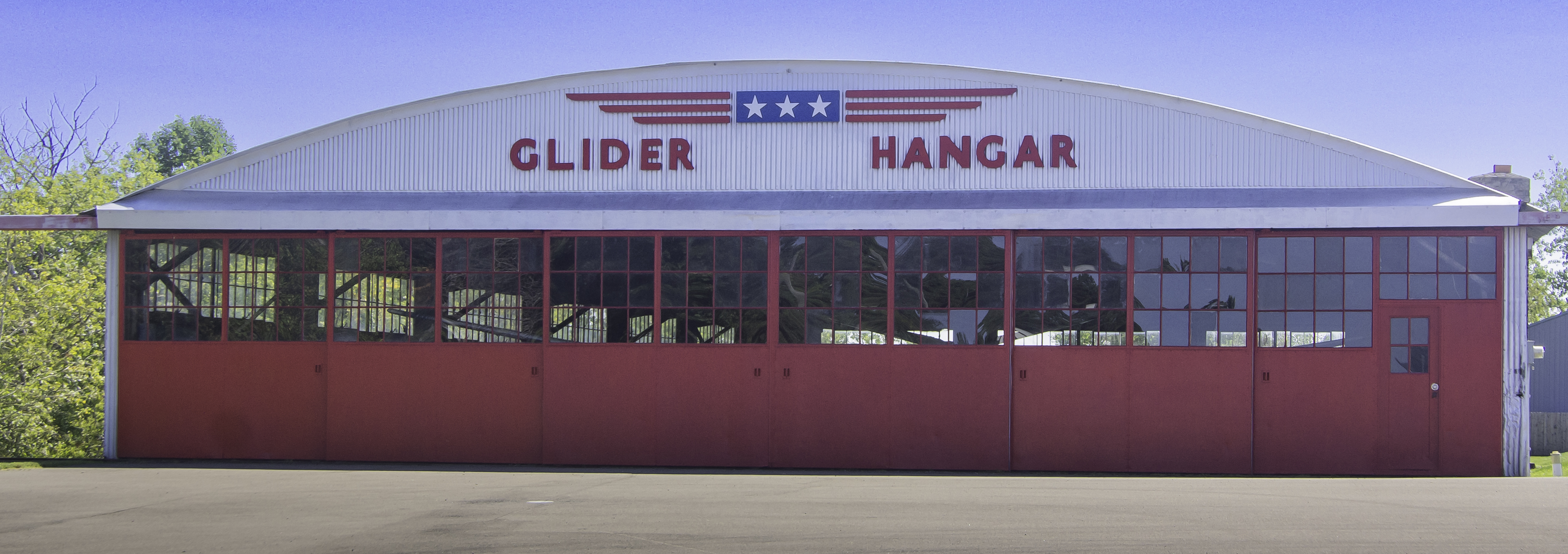

- Location within New York Location within the United States
- Location: 62 Soaring Hill Dr., Big Flats, New York
- Coordinates: 42°07′18″N 76°54′05″W
- Built: 1969
- NRHP reference No.: 13000778
- Added to NRHP: September 25, 2013

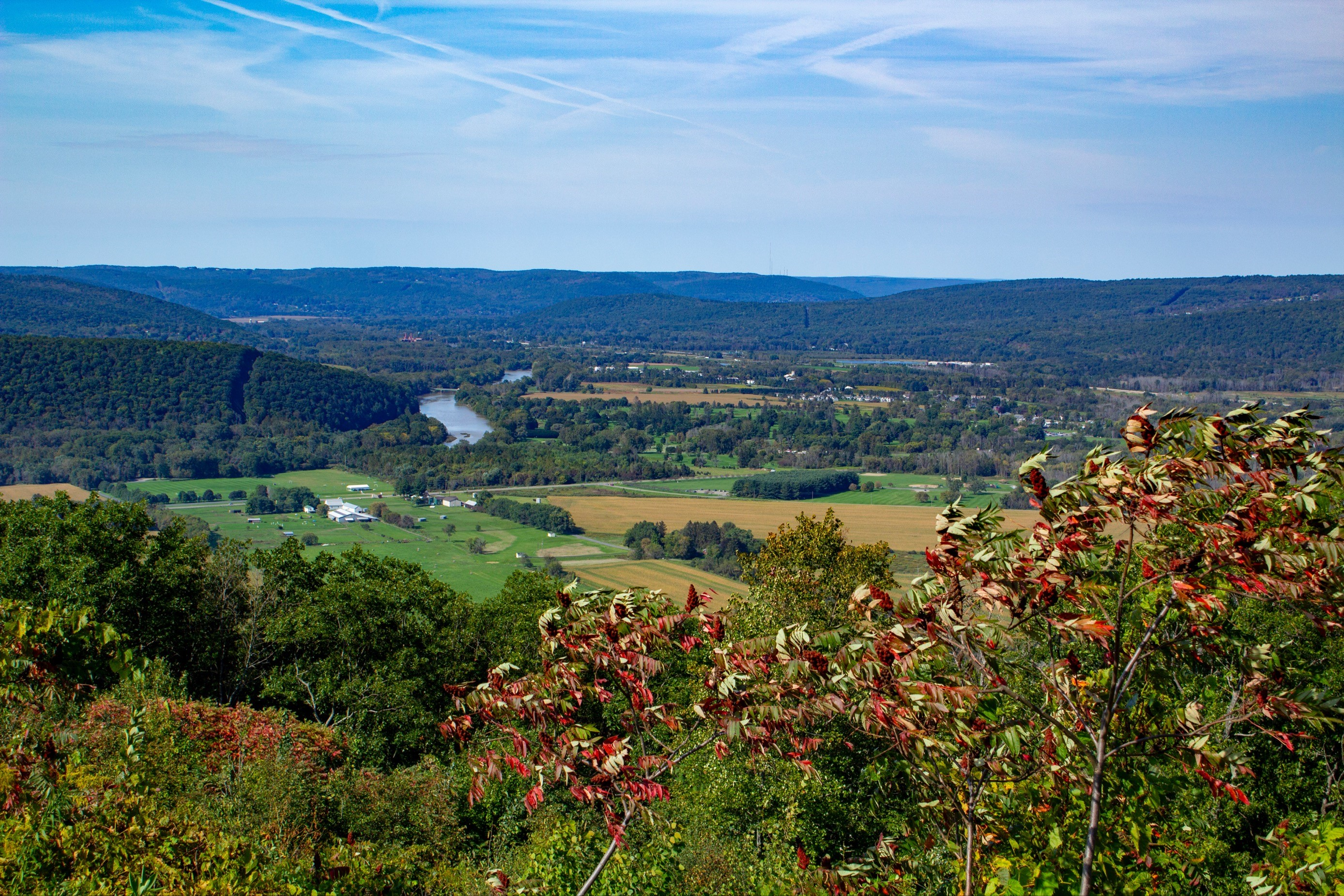
Harris Hill Overlook

The National Soaring Museum (NSM) is an aviation museum in the USA whose stated aim is to preserve the history of motorless flight. It is located in Big Flats Town, New York, at Harris Hill near Elmira.

The NSM is the Soaring Society of America's official repository. In 1975, the SSA Board of Directors transferred the Soaring Hall of Fame to the National Soaring Museum.

The museum features a large collection of vintage and historical gliders.

The museum also administers the National Landmark of Soaring program to recognize people, places and events which are significant in the history of motorless aviation.

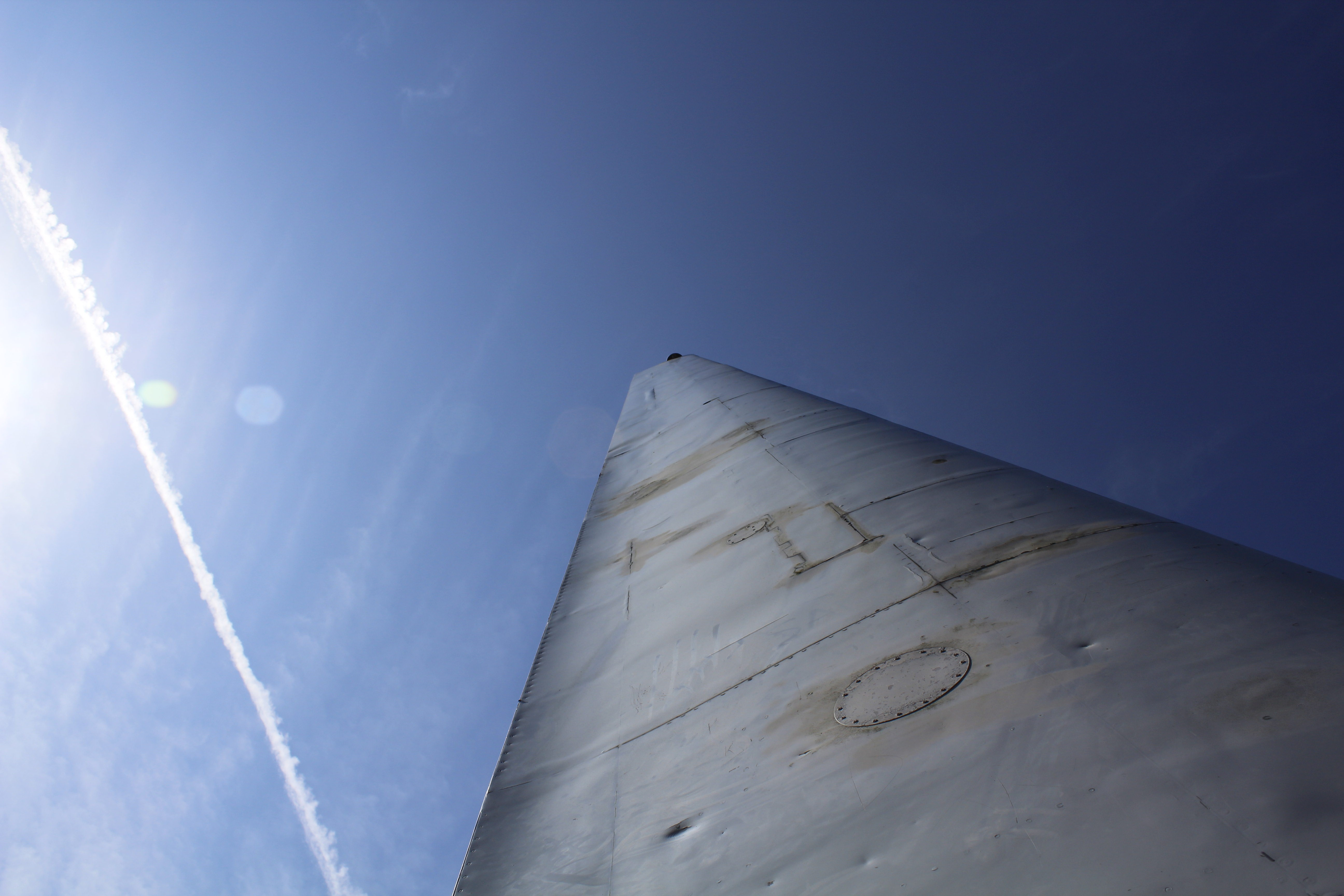
Harris Hill Wing Monument

== History ==
Elmira and Harris Hill have long been associated with soaring in the USA. The establishment of the nation's most prolific glider manufacturer, Schweizer Aircraft in Elmira and the holding of first 13 National Soaring Contests at the site between 1930 and 1946 guaranteed its stature as a location.

During the US National Soaring Contests in the 1950s competitors and organizers discussed the concept of a national soaring museum. A local Elmira museum at Strathmont Estates featured a display on the subject at the time.

In the 1960s, the gliding segment of this small collection was moved to Harris Hill as a result of the work of the Harris Hill Soaring Corporation and Schweizer Aircraft co-founder Paul A. Schweizer.

By 1969 the Soaring Society of America had earmarked Harris Hill as the location for the future National Soaring Museum. The museum was established as an independent nonprofit corporation. The New York State Department of Education chartered the museum as a non-profit educational institution in 1972.

The museum replaced its original fire-damaged building in 1979 with a new 16,000 sq ft (1,500 m^{2}) facility. In 1989 an addition of 12,000 sq ft (1,100 m^{2}) was completed and in 1993 a 3,200 sq ft (300 m^{2}) Collections Annex was completed.

The presence of the NSM at Harris Hill was instrumental in convincing the National Warplane Museum, now called Wings of Eagles to move to the area in 1997. Along with the nearby Glenn H. Curtiss Museum in Hammondsport, New York, these three aviation history museums are major tourist draws to the Elmira region.

In 2013 the original Warren E. Eaton Motorless Flight Facility was listed on the National Register of Historic Places.

== Collection ==
The NSM collection includes:

- Backstrom EPB-1C Flying Plank
- Baker-McMillan Cadet
- Berkshire Concept 70
- Bölkow Phoebus C
- Bowlus BS-100 Super Albatross
- Bowlus BA-100 Baby Albatross
- Bowlus BA-102 Two-Place Baby Albatross
- Bowlus Senior Albatross
- Briegleb BG-6
- Briegleb BG-12BD
- Chanute-Herring 1897 glider
- Culver Rigid Midget
- DFS Olympia Meise
- Elmira Dagling Primary
- Franklin PS-2 (Three examples)
- Franklin-Stevens PS-2
- Glasflügel BS-1
- Glasflügel H-301 Schuemann Libelle
- Glasflügel H-301B Libelle
- Göppingen Gö 3 Minimoa
- Göppingen Gö 1 Wolf
- Gross Sky Ghost
- Hall Cherokee II RM
- Hall Ibex
- Herring-Arnot 1897 glider
- Hutter H-17
- Laister LP-15 Nugget
- Laister-Kauffman LK-10A
- Marske Genesis I
- Mitchell Nimbus III
- Mitchell U-2
- Nelson BB-1 Dragonfly
- Nelson Hummingbird (two examples)
- Peel Z-1 Glider Boat
- PZL-Swidnik PW-5 "Smyk"
- Perl PG-130 Penetrator
- Pratt-Read PR-G1
- Prue IIA
- Prue 215
- Rogallo Hang Glider
- Ross R-6
- Ross-Johnson RJ-5
- Scheibe L-Spatz 55
- Schleicher ASW 12
- Schleicher Ka-6E
- Schreder HP-8 Airmate
- Schreder HP-10
- Schreder HP-11A Airmate
- Schreder HP-16
- Schreder HP-18
- Schweizer SGP 1-1
- Schweizer SGU 1-7
- Schweizer SGU 1-19 (three examples)
- Schweizer SGS 1-23D and 1-23HM
- Schweizer-Burr SGS 1-24 "Brigadoon"
- Schweizer SGS 1-26
- Schweizer SGS 1-26E
- Schweizer SGS 1-29
- Schweizer SGS 1-35
- Schweizer SGS 2-8
- Schweizer SGS 2-12
- Schweizer SGU 2-22
- Schweizer SGS 2-32 (two examples)
- Slingsby UT-1 Dawydoff Cadet
- Slingsby Kirby Gull
- Slingsby T-3 Grasshopper Primary
- Slingsby Type T43 Skylark III
- Waco CG-4A
- Wright 1902 Glider (Replica)
- Wright 1911 Glider (Replica)
- Zoegling Primary

== See also ==
- List of aerospace museums
- List of gliders
- National Register of Historic Places listings in Chemung County, New York
