= H49 =

H49 may refer to:

- HMCS Margaree (H49), a Royal Canadian Navy D-class destroyer
- HMS Diana (H49), a Royal Navy D-class destroyer
- HMS H49, a Royal Navy H-class submarine
- HMS Inconstant (H49), a Royal Navy I-class destroyer
- Lioré et Olivier LeO H-49, a French flying boat
- Nelson H-49, an aircraft engine
- Paralytic strabismus
