= Lobet Ganagobie =

1953 homebuilt aircraft family

Ganagobie

General information
- Type: Homebuilt aircraft
- National origin: France
- Designer: Willam and James Lobet

History
- First flight: 1953

The Ganagobie (English: Big Fish) is a single place, parasol wing homebuilt aircraft that was built by Willam and James Lobet, first flying in 1953.

== Design and development ==
The first example was built in Lille, France using a 1930 Clerget engine, but was abandoned due to replacement engine availability after the first 23 hours of flight. In 1955 an enlarged version was designed by Gorges Jacquemin, increasing the wing area from 70 to 90 sq ft (6.5 to 8.4 m^{2}). Power was from a Poinsard engine. It was marketed as a plans-built homebuilt aircraft by Falconar Avia.

The aircraft is a single place, strut-braced parasol winged design, with conventional landing gear. The all-wood fuselage with plywood covering has a diamond shaped cross-section. The dual wooden spar wings have aircraft fabric covering. A fuel tank is mounted in each wing root. The design can accommodate engines with as low an output as 16 hp (12 kW).

== Variants ==
Ganagobie
first flown in 1952 powered by a Clerget engine.
Ganagobie 02
the first aircraft re-engined with an engine from a target drone.
Ganagobie 3
A second aircraft built by Mr. La Rue Smith in Alberta, Canada, powered by a 54 kW (72 hp) McCulloch O-90 or 30 kW (40 hp) Continental A40.
Ganagobie 4
An ultra-light version built using weight saving techniques and Okoumé Mahogany, powered by a 36 kW (48 hp) Nelson H-63
Ganagobie 05
A developed version typically powered by a 41 kW (55 hp) Limbach SL1700D
Ganagobie Mousebird
an updated design developed for New Zealand regulations.

== Aircraft on display ==
A Nelson H-63-CP powered example of the Ganaboie, built by Haydon L Shafor in 1980, is on display at the EAA Airventure Museum in Oshkosh, Wisconsin.

== Specifications (Ganagobie 05) ==
Data from

General characteristics

- Crew: 1
- Length: 7.4 m (24 ft 3 in)
- Wingspan: 4.92 m (16 ft 2 in)
- Height: 1.83 m (6 ft 0 in)
- Wing area: 8.57 m^{2} (92.2 sq ft)
- Aspect ratio: 6.25
- Airfoil: NACA 23012
- Empty weight: 285 kg (628 lb)
- Gross weight: 322 kg (710 lb)
- Max takeoff weight: 362 kg (798 lb)
- Fuel capacity: 45.3 L (12.0 US gal; 10.0 imp gal)
- Powerplant: 1 × Limbach SL1700D Four cylinder air-cooled horizontally opposed aircraft engine, 41 kW (55 hp)
- Propellers: 2-bladed, 1.5 m (4 ft 11 in) diameter

Performance

- Maximum speed: 182 km/h (113 mph, 98 kn) at Max. TO weight
- Cruise speed: 161 km/h (100 mph, 87 kn) at 75% power
- Stall speed: 78 km/h (48 mph, 42 kn)
- Service ceiling: 3,050 m (10,010 ft)
