= Brown Rebel =

American glider

General information
- Type: Glider
- National origin: United States
- Designer: Irving Prue and Lyle Maxey
- Primary user: Bob Brown
- Number built: 1

History
- Introduction date: 1957
- Developed from: Maxey Jennie Mae

The Rebel was an American high-wing, V-tailed, single-seat glider that was created by Bob Brown in 1957.

== Design and development ==
The Rebel was created by joining the wing from the Lyle Maxey designed Jennie Mae to a fuselage from the Irv Prue designed Prue 215. It had a wingspan of 48 ft (14.6 m)with an aspect ratio of 23.8. The airfoil was a NACA 65 (3)-518 and achieved a best L/D of 37.5. Only one was built and it is no longer listed on the Federal Aviation Administration registry.

== Operational history ==
The Rebel was flown extensively in competitions. At a contest in Tulsa, OK over Memorial Day weekend in 1959, Brown placed 3rd flying the Rebel. Brown flew it in the 1959 US National Soaring Championships at Elmira, NY, placing 24th. At the Southwestern and Texas Soaring Championships held in September 1959 in Grand Prairie, TX, Brown placed 2nd flying the Rebel. In 1959, Brown and the Rebel made four flights over 200 mi (322 km), two of which were over 300 mi (483 km).

Over Memorial Day weekend in 1960, Brown took first place in a contest at Fort Rucker, AL. Brown then flew the Rebel to 33rd place in the US National Soaring Championships held at Odessa, TX. Over Labor Day weekend 1960, Brown and the Rebel took first place in a contest at Marietta, GA.

In 1961, Brown flew the Rebel in the National Soaring Championships held at Wichita, KS. He placed 21st.

By 1964, Brown had the Rebel up for sale.

== Specifications (Rebel) ==
Data from Licher

General characteristics

- Crew: one
- Wingspan: 48 ft (15 m)
- Wing area: 102 sq ft (9.5 m^{2})
- Aspect ratio: 23.8:1
- Airfoil: Root: NACA 65 (3)-518
- Empty weight: 403 lb (183 kg)
- Gross weight: 623 lb (283 kg)

Performance

- Maximum glide ratio: 37.5:1 at 57 mph (92 km/h)
- Rate of sink: 120 ft/min (0.61 m/s) at 51 mph (82 km/h)
- Wing loading: 6.1 lb/sq ft (30 kg/m^{2})

== See also ==
Related lists

- List of gliders
