= Schweizer SGU 1-7 =

SGU 1-7
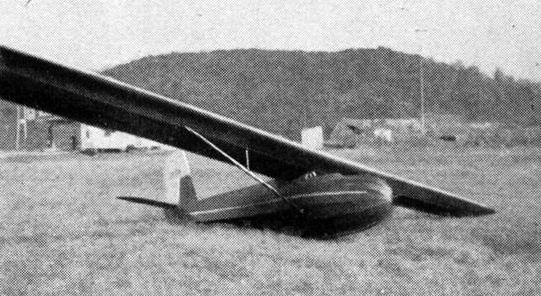

General information
- Type: Open-class sailplane
- National origin: United States
- Manufacturer: Schweizer Metal Aircraft Company
- Designer: Ernst and Paul Schweizer
- Number built: 2

History
- First flight: 1937; 89 years ago

The Schweizer SGU 1-7 is an American Open Class, single-seat, high-wing strut braced glider built by Schweizer Metal Aircraft Company of Elmira, New York.

The first 1-7 was built in 1937 and the second one was completed in 1939.

The 1-7 was the first Schweizer aircraft which was produced as more than a single example and it was the first aircraft that the company sold.

== Design and development ==
Schweizer Aircraft started construction of the 1-7 prototype 1937, shortly after the SGU 1-6 came in third in the 1937 Eaton Design Contest. The intention was that the winning design would be made available as drawings and kits for amateur construction and that Bureau of Air Commerce certification would be sought.

The 1-6 had not fared well in the competition and none of the winners in the contest had proven as easy to construct as the contest organizers had hoped. As a result of the lessons learned in the Eaton contest a new clean-sheet design was started by the Schweizer brothers.

The resulting single seater-seventh design (1-7) was quite different from the 1-6. The 1-6 had been an all-metal design including aluminum-covered wings and was the first all-metal glider ever built.

The 1-7 was designed to use more traditional methods and has a steel-tube fuselage frame covered in aircraft fabric. The wing is a constant chord, single spar, strut-braced type, including jury struts. The wing and horizontal tail are built from aluminum with fabric covering. The aircraft was designed to be as simple and inexpensive as possible to construct, even at the cost of higher performance.

The 1-7 design was never certified and both aircraft completed were registered as experimental amateur-built aircraft.

While only two Schweizer SGU 1-7s were built the type was the beginning of a long line of Schweizer gliders based upon this design. The 1-7 lead directly lead to the improved single place Schweizer SGU 1-19 and long-wing Schweizer SGU 1-20. With two seats installed the basic design became the Schweizer SGU 2-22 trainer and finally evolved into the Schweizer SGS 2-33.

== Operational history ==
SGU 1-7 serial number 1 was completed in 1937. It was later destroyed by mistake as scrap.

SGU 1-7 serial number 2 was completed in 1939 and registered as N23026. It had a long career, until its flight certificate expired in 2017.

The aircraft was originally sold to the Altosaurus Soaring Club of North Conway, New Hampshire for US$595. This club was formed by a group of Harvard University skiers from the Schussverien Ski Club. They used the single-seat 1-7 to teach themselves to fly by auto tow and winch launch. The aircraft was thought by the club members to resemble a pterodactyl in flight and was painted with one on both sides of the aircraft's nose.

The aircraft was sold in the 1950s to Lloyd Lichner then general manager of the Soaring Society of America, who flew it often in California, including at the cliff-soaring site at Torrey Pines.

The aircraft was later owned by Ralph Heide of El Segundo, California in the 1980s. He carried out a complete restoration of the aircraft in the mid-1980s.

Today 1-7 serial number 2 belongs to the National Soaring Museum.

== Specifications ==
General characteristics

- Crew: One
- Wingspan: 36 ft 0 in (10.97 m)
- Wing area: 134 sq ft (12.5 m^{2})
- Empty weight: 243 lb (110 kg)
- Gross weight: 423 lb (192 kg)

Performance

- Maximum glide ratio: 17.5 at 45 mph (72 km/h)
- Rate of sink: 210 ft/min (1.07 m/s)

== See also ==
Aircraft of comparable role, configuration, and era

- Hütter Hü 17

Related lists

- List of gliders
