= Hall Ibex =

American glider

General information
- Type: Experimental glider
- National origin: United States
- Manufacturer: Stan Hall
- Designer: Stan Hall
- Status: In storage
- Primary user: Stan Hall
- Number built: 1

History
- First flight: 1968

The Hall Ibex is an experimental, American, gull winged, single seat glider that was designed by Stan Hall and first flown in 1968.

== Design & Development ==
The Ibex was designed by Hall to investigate the reduced wetted area of the pod and boom configuration, hands off spiral stability of a gull wing, and the low speed performance of wide NACA slotted flaps. It also features a V tail, 135 lb (61 kg) of water ballast and a 15 m (49.2 ft) wingspan to comply with FAI Standard Class rules. On one of its first flights the Ibex showed significant tail flutter. Initially Hall considered replacing the tail with a conventional empennage and tail but ended up moving the ruddervator counterweights from the tips to the roots which eliminated the problem.

== Operational history ==
The Ibex was still flying in 1980 and was eventually donated to the National Soaring Museum.

== Aircraft on display ==
- National Soaring Museum - 1 in storage

== Specifications (Hall Ibex) ==
Data from Sailplane Directory

General characteristics

- Crew: one
- Wingspan: 49 ft 0 in (15 m)
- Wing area: 125 sq ft (11.6 m^{2})
- Aspect ratio: 19.2
- Airfoil: FX61-163 Root, 60-126 Tip
- Empty weight: 580 lb (263 kg)
- Gross weight: 905 lb (411 kg) 135 lbs of Water Ballast

Performance

- Maximum glide ratio: 34:1
- Lift-to-drag: 34
- Wing loading: 7.25 lb/sq ft (35.4 kg/m^{2})

== See also ==
- List of gliders
