= Nelson Dragonfly =

American motorglider

Dragonfly
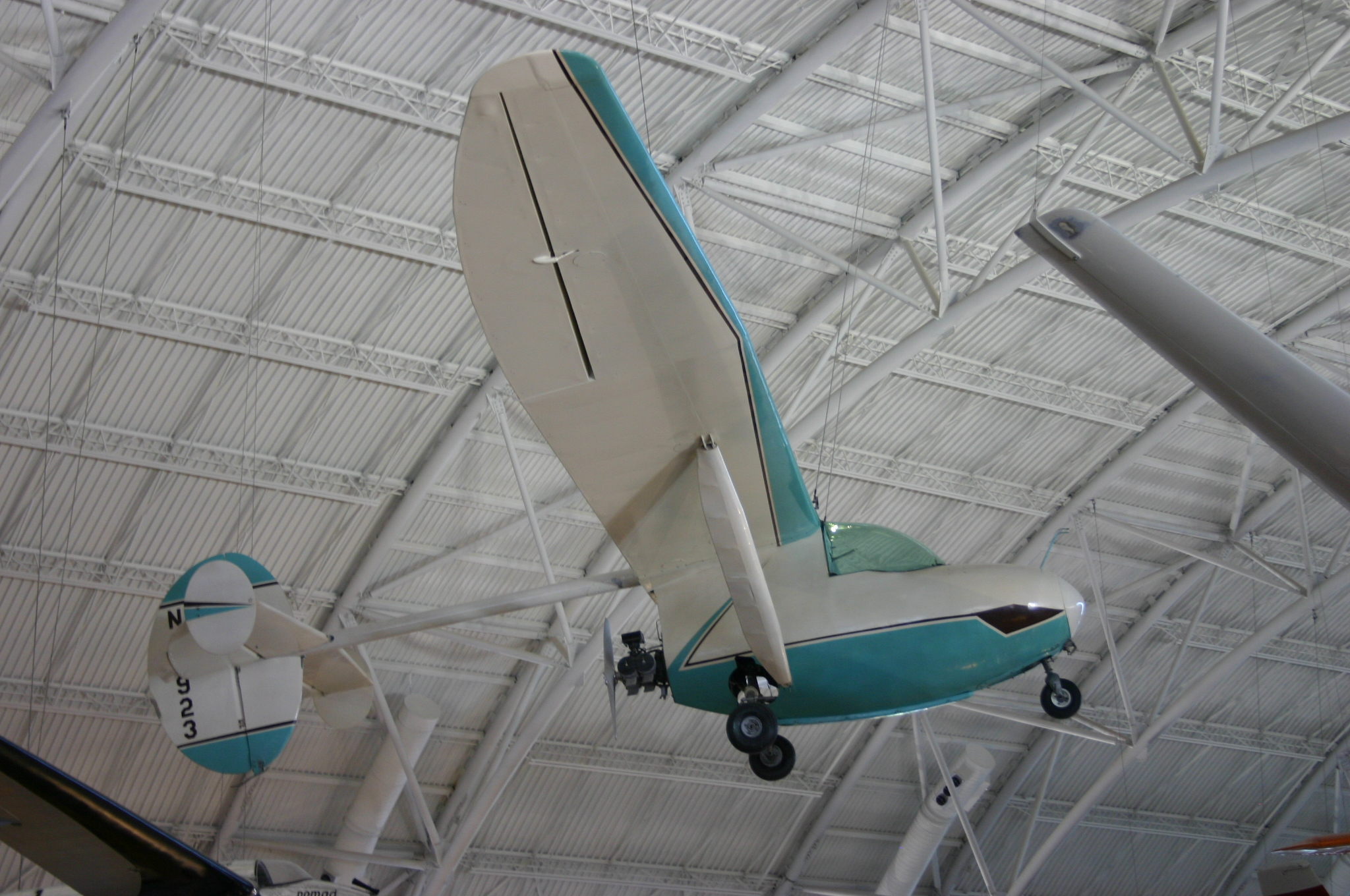
- A Bowlus/Nelson BB-1 Dragonfly in storage at the Steven F. Udvar-Hazy Center in Dulles, Virginia.

General information
- Type: Motor glider
- National origin: United States
- Manufacturer: Hawley Bowlus
- Designer: Hawley Bowlus
- Number built: 7

History
- Introduction date: 1947
- Developed from: Bowlus BA-100 Baby Albatross

The Bowlus/Nelson BB-1 Dragonfly is an American, two seat, strut-braced, high-wing motor glider that was developed from the Bowlus BA-100 Baby Albatross glider by Hawley Bowlus.

== Design and development ==
The development of the Dragonfly was sponsored by the Nelson Engine Company to promote the use of their H-44 25 hp (19 kW) four cylinder two-stroke engine. The engine was mounted in the rear of the fuselage pod, in pusher configuration, with the wooden two bladed 42 in (107 cm) propeller below the metal tail boom. The fuel tank holds 3 U.S. gallons (11 L; 2.5 imp gal), enough for self-launching, but not for cross-country powered flight.

The Dragonfly shares the Baby Albatross's molded plywood fuselage pod, aluminium tube tail boom and strut-braced double spar wooden wing, covered in aircraft fabric aft of the spar. The leading edge is a plywood D-cell. The aircraft features dual controls and a retractable tricycle landing gear with a steerable nose wheel. The engine is started by a ratchet-wire recoil start system that allows restarts in flight, as well as on the ground.

Federal Aviation Administration certification of the type was achieved on 21 April 1947, with Nelson Aircraft Corporation as the certificate holder and the type officially known as Nelson Auxiliary Power Glider BB-1. The type certificate indicates that neither the engine nor the propeller need be certified. The type certificate specifies that the Nelson H-49 engine of 28 hp (21 kW) may also be installed.

The Dragonfly was later replaced in production by the improved Nelson Hummingbird PG-185B.

== Operational history ==
In operational use the Nelson powerplant proved heavy and lacking in power and, as the Sailplane Directory terms it, "the result was an under-powered sailplane". The 25 hp (19 kW) engine gave the Dragonfly a sea level climb rate of just 235 fpm (1.19 m/s) and a take-off run of 900 ft (274 m). As a result of the performance deficiencies only seven were produced. Three Dragonflys were sold to private owners in the Seattle region after having their engines removed.

In March 2011 there were still four BB-1s registered in the US, two of which had been transferred to the National Soaring Museum.

== Aircraft on display ==
- Canadian Museum of Flight
- National Soaring Museum

== Specifications (Dragonfly) ==
Data from Sailplane Directory, Soaring and FAA Type Certificate Data Sheet

General characteristics

- Crew: one
- Capacity: one passenger
- Wingspan: 47 ft 4 in (14.43 m)
- Wing area: 169 sq ft (15.7 m^{2})
- Aspect ratio: 13.25
- Empty weight: 580 lb (263 kg)
- Gross weight: 940 lb (426 kg)
- Fuel capacity: 3 U.S. gallons (11 L; 2.5 imp gal)
- Powerplant: 1 × Nelson H-44 four cylinder, two stroke, 25 hp (19 kW)
- Propellers: 2-bladed wooden, 3 ft 6 in (1.07 m) diameter

Performance

- Maximum glide ratio: 18:1
- Rate of climb: 235 ft/min (1.19 m/s)
- Wing loading: 5.56 lb/sq ft (27.1 kg/m^{2})

== See also ==
- List of gliders
