= Nelson Hummingbird PG-185B =

American motorglider

Hummingbird PG-185B
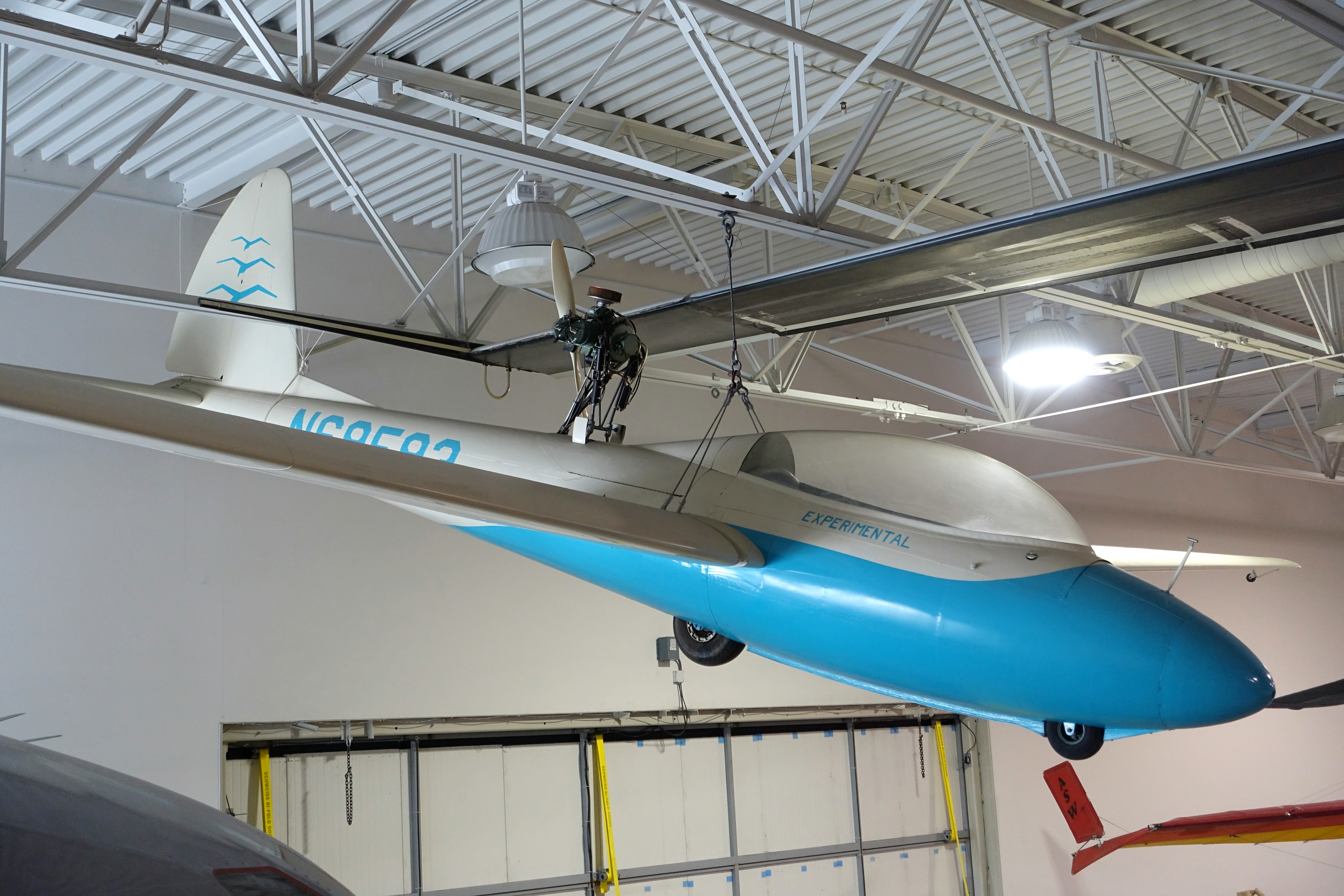

General information
- Type: Motor glider
- National origin: United States
- Manufacturer: Nelson Aircraft
- Designer: Ted Nelson and Harry Perl
- Number built: 7

History
- Introduction date: 1953

The Nelson Hummingbird PG-185B is an American, tandem two seat, mid-wing motor glider that was developed by Nelson Aircraft after discontinuing the Nelson Dragonfly.

== Design and development ==
In 1949, Nelson began the design of another self-launching glider, but this time, he teamed-up with Harry Perl and Don Mitchell. They called this new design the Hummingbird.

Introduced in 1953, the Hummingbird was an attempt to improve upon the marginal performance of the Dragonfly, of which only seven were produced. The resulting design is a mid-wing glider built predominantly from wood, with the wing leading edge filled with styrofoam and doped aircraft fabric used on the aft portion of the wing, the tail and the rudder. After the first two were completed the remainder were built from metal in place of wood.

The design features an all-flying stabilator with an anti-servo tab, spoilers on the wing's top surface and dive brakes on the bottom. The Nelson H-59 4-cylinder engine was mounted on a retractable mast aft of the bubble canopy. The aircraft has two wheels in tandem, the front being steerable and connected to the rudder pedals.

The design was not type certified, and the seven built were registered under the Experimental - Racing - Exhibition category. Nelson later sold the rights to the aircraft and the engine to Charles Rhoades of Naples, Florida.

== Operational history ==
In the mid-1950s a Hummingbird was flown by Les Arnold to an unofficial US motorgliding distance record of 321 mi (517 km).

In March 2011 there were still five registered in the US, two of which had been transferred to the National Soaring Museum.

A gliderport in Livermore, California was named "Hummingbird Haven" as several of the craft were based there.

== Aircraft on display ==
- Golden Age Flight Museum
- Western Antique Aeroplane and Automobile Museum
- National Soaring Museum - 2
- National Air and Space Museum
- US Southwest Soaring Museum

== Specifications (PG-185B) ==
Data from Sailplane Directory and Soaring

General characteristics

- Crew: one
- Capacity: one passenger
- Wingspan: 54 ft 0 in (16.46 m)
- Wing area: 185 sq ft (17.2 m^{2})
- Aspect ratio: 15.76
- Airfoil: Go 549 (root), Go 676 (tip)
- Empty weight: 800 lb (363 kg)
- Gross weight: 1,200 lb (544 kg)
- Powerplant: 1 × Nelson H-59 , 40 hp (30 kW)
- Propellers: 2-bladed wooden

Performance

- Maximum glide ratio: 25:1 at 55 mph
- Rate of sink: 180 ft/min (0.91 m/s) at 52 mph
- Wing loading: 6.48 lb/sq ft (31.6 kg/m^{2})

== See also ==
Related development

- Perl PG-130 Penetrator - another Harry Perl design

Related lists

- List of gliders
