= Prue 215 =

American glider

215

General information
- Type: Glider
- National origin: United States
- Designer: Irving Prue
- Number built: 3

History
- Introduction date: 1949

The Prue 215 is an American high-wing, V-tailed, single-seat glider that was designed by Irving Prue in 1949.

== Design and development ==
The Prue 215 is an all-metal design with a short 40 ft (12.2 m) wing with a relatively high aspect ratio of 20:1. The wing uses a NACA 23012 airfoil at the wing root, becoming a NACA 8318 at the wing tip. Airfoil-shaped flaps are mounted below and behind the wing for glidepath control. The aircraft uses a retractable monowheel landing gear.

Three Prue 215s were built, all as amateur-builts from plans. The initial one was Prue's prototype. The second one was built by Ed Minghelli and later owned by Max Dreher, who mounted a jet engine on it. The second and third built are designated 215A.

== Operational history ==
The second Prue 215 built was flown to second place in the 1958 US Nationals by Harold Hutchinson.

Only one Prue 215 remains listed on the Federal Aviation Administration registry.

== Variants ==
215
The first aircraft constructed was designated as a Prue 215.
215A
The second and third aircraft constructed were given the designation Prue 215A.
Brown Rebel
Prue 215 fuselage mated to wings from the Lyle Maxey Jennie Mae

== Aircraft on display ==
- National Soaring Museum - one, listed as in storage in June 2011.

== Specifications (215) ==
Data from Sailplane Directory and Soaring

General characteristics

- Crew: one
- Wingspan: 40 ft (12 m)
- Wing area: 90 sq ft (8.4 m^{2})
- Aspect ratio: 20:1
- Airfoil: Root: NACA 23012, tip: NACA 8318
- Empty weight: 340 lb (154 kg)
- Gross weight: 540 lb (245 kg)

Performance

- Maximum glide ratio: 29:1 at 52 mph (84 km/h)
- Rate of sink: 156 ft/min (0.79 m/s) at 40 mph (64 km/h)
- Wing loading: 6.0 lb/sq ft (29 kg/m^{2})

== See also ==
Related lists

- List of gliders
