= Peel Z-1 Glider Boat =

American glider

Z-1 Glider Boat
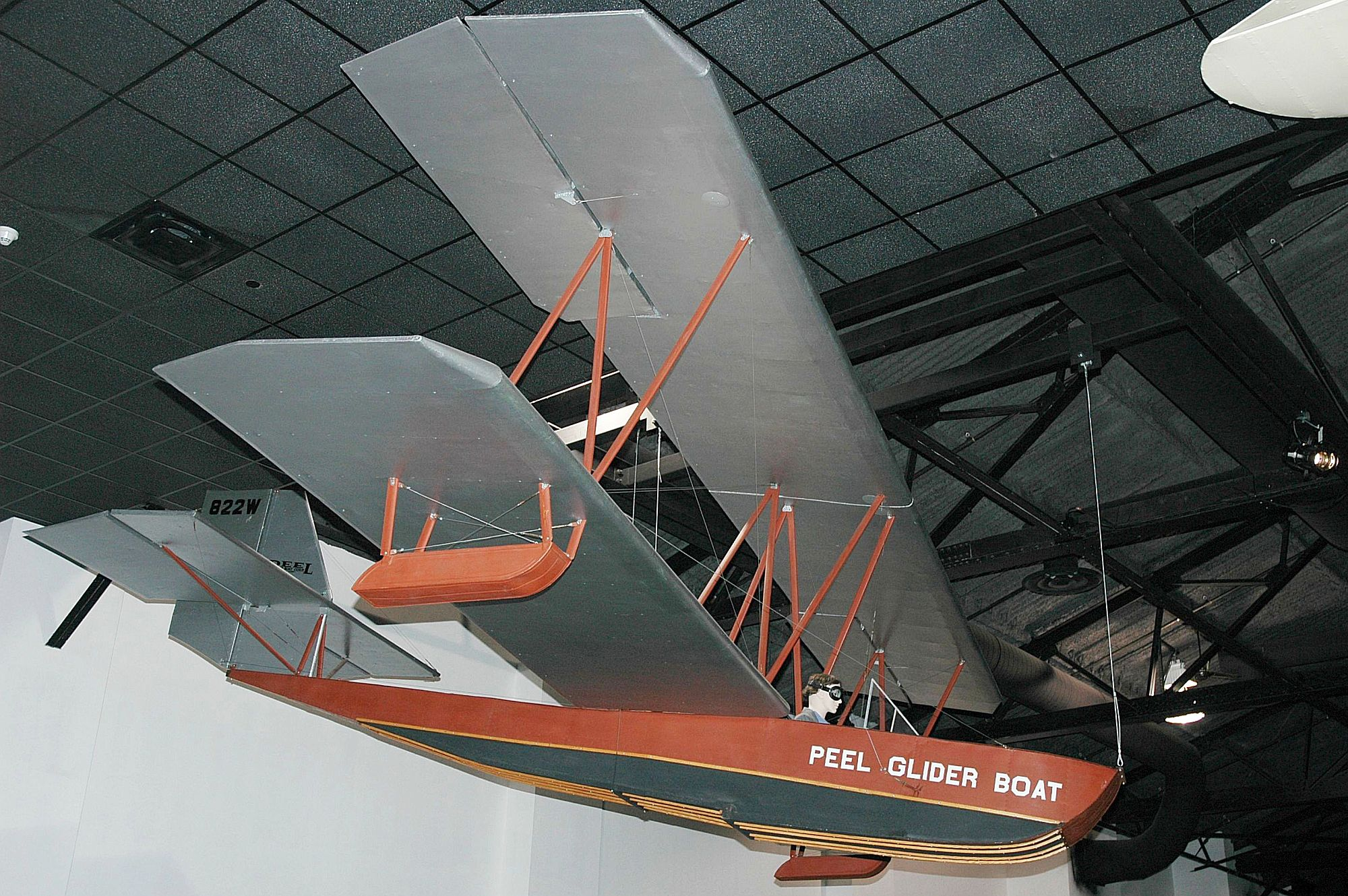

General information
- Type: Glider
- National origin: United States
- Manufacturer: Peel Glider Boat Company
- Status: Production completed
- Number built: 30

History
- Introduction date: circa 1930

The Peel Z-1 Glider Boat, also called the Peel Flying Boat, is an American biplane, two-seats-in-tandem, flying boat glider that was designed and produced by the Peel Glider Boat Company, starting in about 1930.

== Design and development ==
The Glider Boat was intended as a strictly recreational aircraft, to be towed from the water surface by a powered boat. The company intended to produce a very inexpensive aircraft to cash in on the sudden popularity of aviation following Charles Lindbergh’s 1927 solo flight across the Atlantic Ocean.

The aircraft is of mixed construction. The 31 ft (9.4 m) span wing has a wooden spar, steel ribs and is covered in doped aircraft fabric covering. The two wings have a large total area of 270 sq ft (25 m^{2}) and combined with the light gross weight of 600 lb (270 kg) give a very light wing loading of just 2.2 lb/sq ft (11 kg/m^{2}). The lower wing tips feature wingtip floats. The hull is made from duralumin and features a stepped shape, similar to most powered flying boats. The aircraft has conventional aircraft controls and was delivered without instruments.

The aircraft was normally launched by a tow rope attached to the glider by a Y-shaped bridle, with release hooks on both sides of the front cockpit. Climbing to a maximum height of 1,000 ft (305 m) as limited by the supplied tow rope, the glider would then release and glide to a landing on the water surface.

The aircraft was placed in quantity production and sold for US$595 each. Thirty were built before the company went out of business in the Great Depression.

== Operational history ==
In August 2011 there were no Peel Glider Boats left on the US Federal Aviation Administration aircraft registry.

== Aircraft on display ==
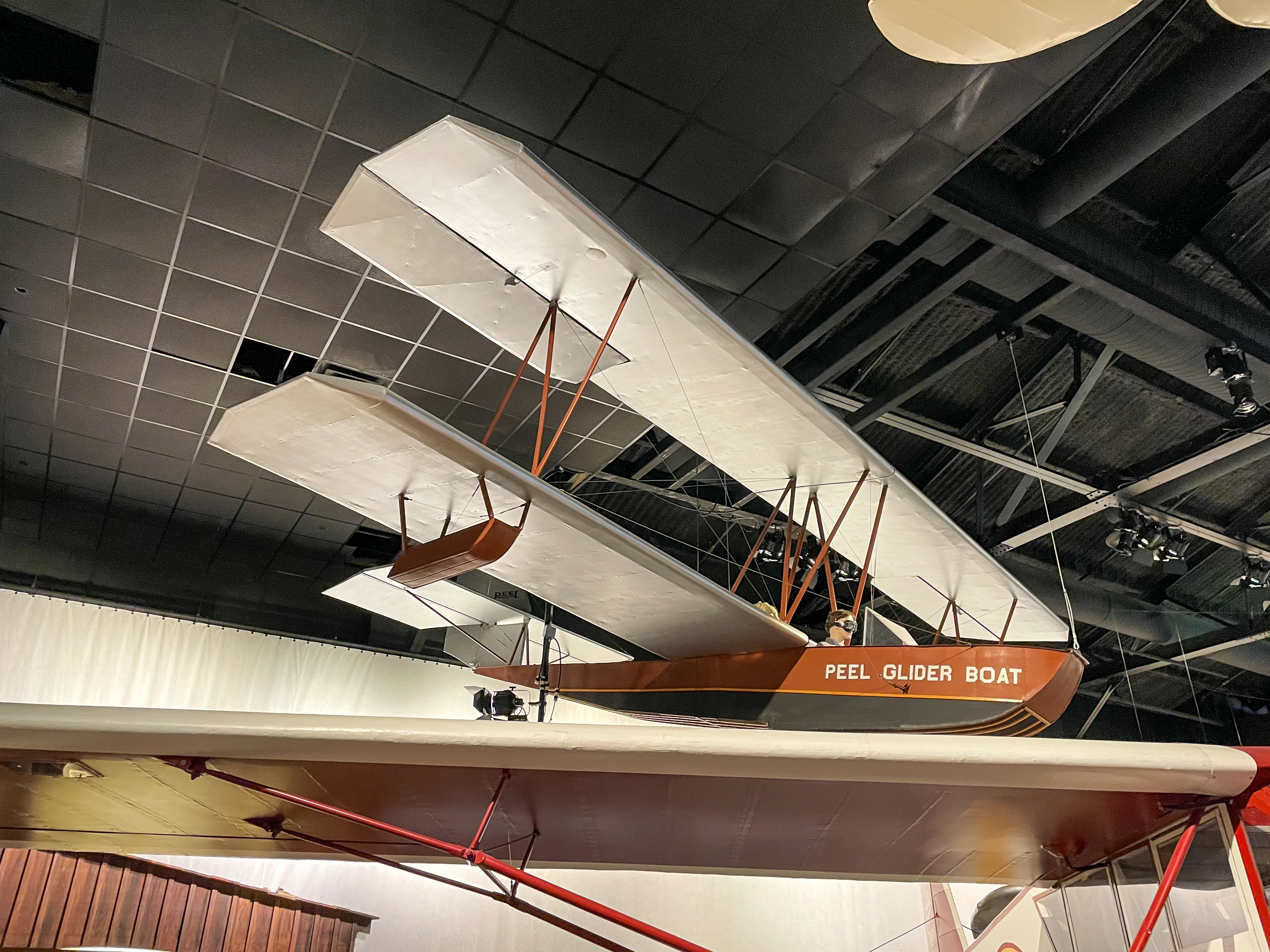
Peel Z-1 Glider Boat at the Cradle of Aviation Museum

- Cradle of Aviation Museum
- EAA AirVenture Museum
- National Soaring Museum

== Specifications (Glider Boat) ==
Data from Sailplane Directory and AirVenture Museum

General characteristics

- Crew: one
- Capacity: one passenger
- Length: 22 ft (6.7 m)
- Wingspan: 31 ft (9.4 m)
- Wing area: 270 sq ft (25 m^{2})
- Empty weight: 250 lb (113 kg)
- Gross weight: 600 lb (272 kg)

Performance

- Maximum speed: 30 mph (48 km/h, 26 kn)
- Maximum glide ratio: 15:1 (some sources say 18:1)
- Wing loading: 2.2 lb/sq ft (11 kg/m^{2})

== See also ==
Related lists

- List of gliders
