= Laister LP-15 Nugget =

American glider

LP-15 Nugget
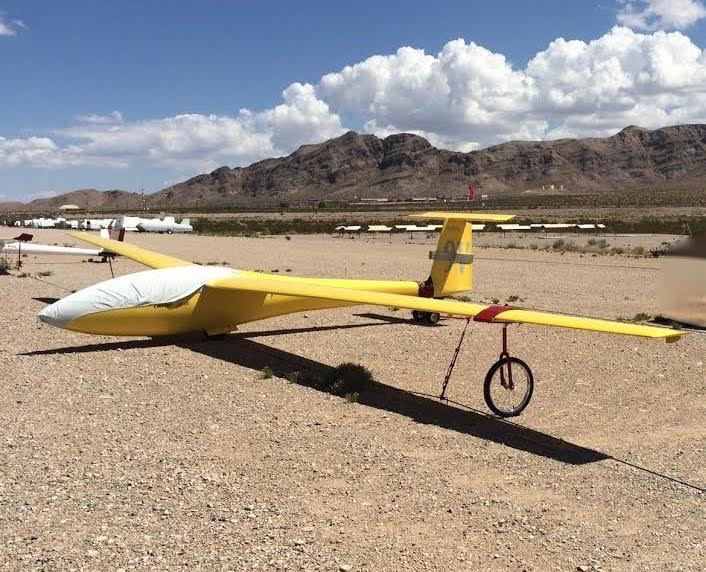

General information
- Type: Glider
- National origin: United States
- Manufacturer: Laister Sailplanes
- Designer: Jack and Bill Laister
- Status: Production completed
- Number built: 15

History
- First flight: 1971

The Laister LP-15 Nugget is an American single-seat, high-wing glider designed by Jack and Bill Laister for the FAI Standard Class. It first flew in 1971.

== Design and development ==
Designed in the 1970s, the Nugget was intended to compete with the new European fiberglass gliders that were beginning to appear, and as such incorporated mixed construction methods. The fuselage is built with a fiberglass cockpit area, with the fuselage aft of the wing trailing edge made from aluminum. The wing is of Chem-weld bonded aluminum construction, the bonding replacing rivets in an attempt to get a surface as smooth and wave-free as fiberglass. The wing employs a Wortmann FX 67 170/150 airfoil and has flaps. The long span flaps serve both as speed-range drag reducing camber changing devices and full deflection high-lift/high-drag landing flaps. The aircraft can carry up to 185 lb (84 kg) of water ballast in a center fuselage tank, located at the center of gravity. The landing gear is a retractible monowheel.

Even though several sources report that the LP-15 was type certified, no type certificate was ever filed for it and all aircraft are registered as Experimental-Racing, Experimental-Exhibition or Experimental-Amateur-built. The LP in the designation indicates Laister Products and the model number is the wingspan in metres.

== Operational history ==
As of January 2016 there were still 9 LP-15 Nuggets registered in the USA.

== Aircraft on display ==
- National Soaring Museum - 1

== Specifications (LP-15) ==
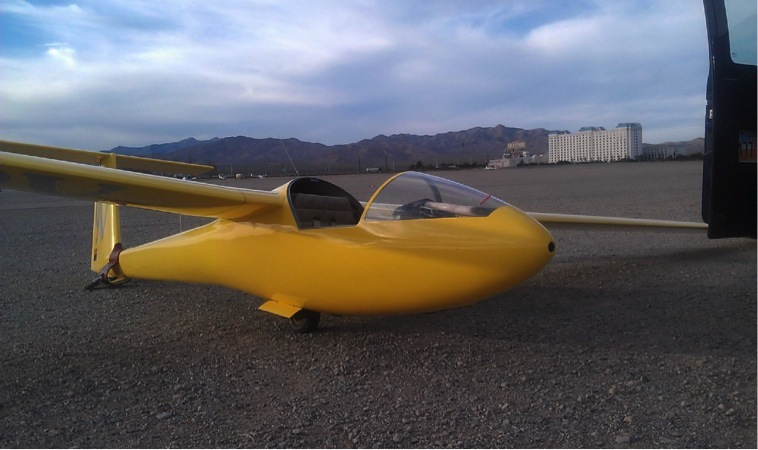
Laister LP-15 Nugget

Data from Sailplane Directory and Soaring

General characteristics

- Crew: one
- Wingspan: 49 ft 3 in (15.0 m)
- Wing area: 109 sq ft (10.1 m^{2})
- Aspect ratio: 22.2:1
- Airfoil: Wortmann FX 67 170/150
- Empty weight: 425 lb (193 kg)
- Gross weight: 900 lb (408 kg) including 185 lb (84 kg) of water ballast

Performance

- Maximum glide ratio: 36.5:1 at 58 mph (93 km/h)
- Rate of sink: 130 ft/min (0.66 m/s) at 49 mph (79 km/h)
- Wing loading: 8.25 lb/sq ft (40.3 kg/m^{2}) with full water ballast

== See also ==
- List of gliders
