= Schweizer SGU 1-19 =

American family of gliders

SGU 1-19 and SGU 1-20
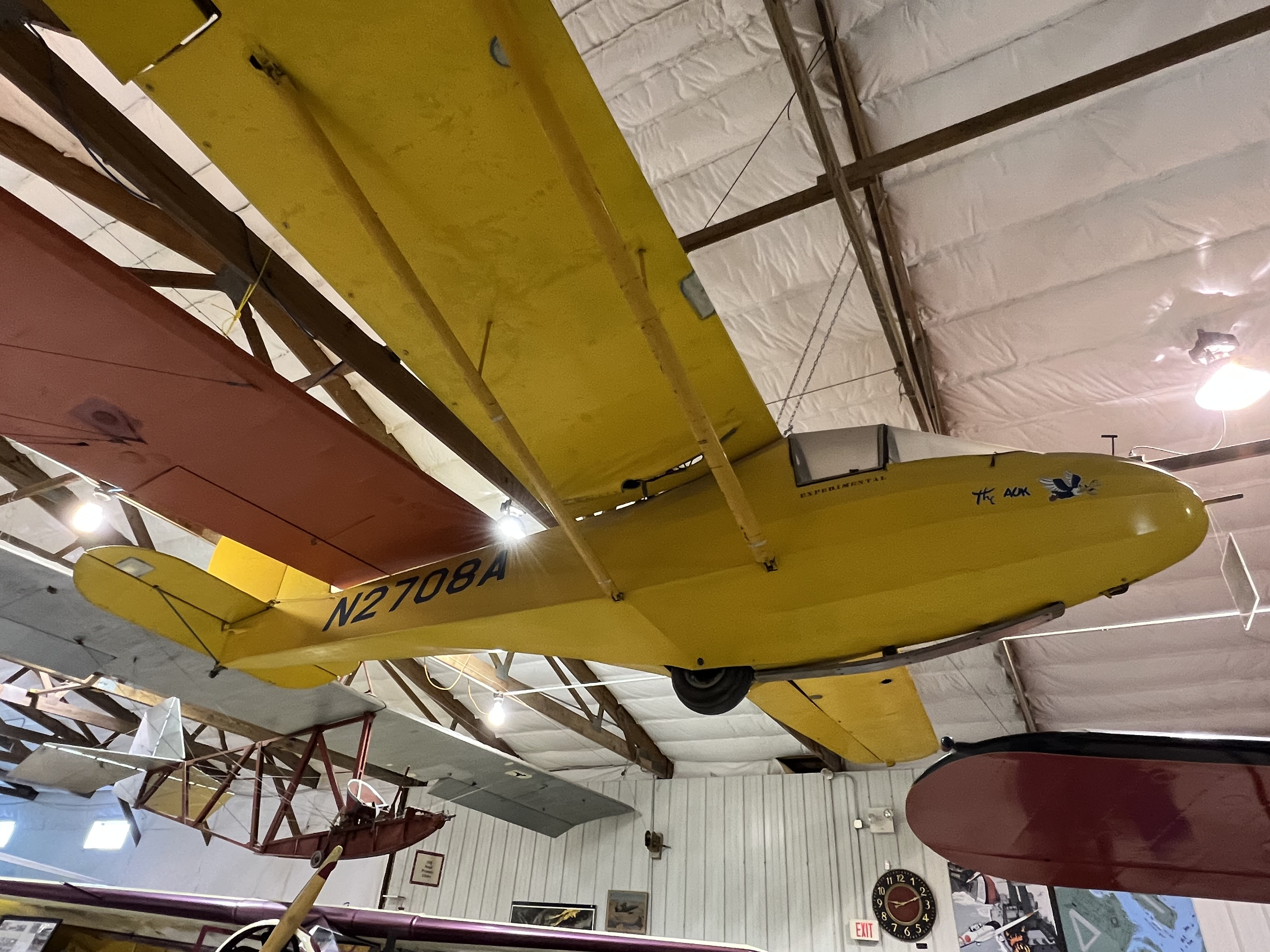
- Schweizer SGU 1-20 at the Iowa Aviation Museum

General information
- Type: Open-class sailplane
- National origin: United States
- Manufacturer: Schweizer Aircraft Corporation
- Designer: Ernest Schweizer
- Number built: 50

History
- First flight: 1944

The Schweizer SGU 1-19 and Schweizer SGU 1-20 are a family of United States single-seat, high-wing, strut-braced, utility gliders built by Schweizer Aircraft of Elmira, New York.

The 1-19 was a 1944 development of the pre-war SGU 1-7 and bears a strong resemblance to the earlier craft. It was designed for single place training and soaring flights.

The 1-20 was an improved version of the 1-19 with a wingspan of 43 feet (13 m) replacing the 36-foot (11 m) wing on the 1-19.

== Background ==
Schweizer Aircraft had produced the SGS 2-8 and SGS 2-12 training gliders for the US military as well as producing many aircraft parts under subcontract for the war effort. As the Second World War was drawing to a close the company decided to continue to make gliding part of their business plan.

Many economic forecasts had predicted a post war aviation boom, with thousands of military trained airmen returning home to the US to fly civil aircraft. Like many aircraft manufacturers Schweizer planned to produce new aircraft for the boom.

Once the war had ended the availability of cheap military surplus gliders severely limited the market for sales of new gliders. By the summer of 1948 it was obvious that the boom was not going to occur and this left manufacturers with surplus inventory of powered light aircraft and, in the case of Schweizer, gliders.

== Development ==
With production of the SGS 2-8 and SGS 2-12 military training gliders complete in 1944, Schweizer Aircraft did studies of a series of utility and sailplane designs, trying to determine what would best suit the post-war market. Design studies conducted in this period included:

- Single-place SGU 1-16 utility glider
- Single-place SGS 1-17 sailplane
- Two-place SGS 2-18 sailplane

None of these designs proceeded to the stage of constructing a prototype.

Schweizer Aircraft decided to concentrate on two designs, both based on the utility glider layout of the Schweizer SGU 1-7. The single place version was the 1-19 and the two place was designated as the SGU 2-22, both designed by Ernest Schweizer.

=== 1-19 ===
The 1-19 first flew in 1944 and was quickly ordered by Schweizer's 15 US dealers in large numbers for use as a trainer. Fifty were completed.

Construction of the constant chord 1-19 wing was of wood and fabric. It utilized a two spar, double strutted design. The fuselage and tail were made from welded tube covered with aircraft fabric. The 1-19 was originally produced with an open cockpit, but in service most were modified with the addition of canopies. The 1-19 is very light, with an empty weight of just 320 lb (150 kg), but it is complex to assemble and disassemble as this requires use of many small pins.

=== 1-20 ===
Designer Ernest Schweizer quickly identified a need for a version of the 1-19 with better performance and designed a new set of wings for it. The new aircraft, with an additional seven feet of span, was designated the SGU 1-20. The additional wingspan brought the glide ratio up to 18.5:1 from the 1-19's 16:1. A single factory-built 1-20 was completed, NX-91840. Two additional 1-20's were created by private owners who converted their 1-19 by replacing their stock wings with the longer wing.

The wings were made available as kits and a number of 1-19s were converted to 1-20s.

=== Motorized 1-19 ===
In 1946 the company experimented with a motorglider conversion of the 1-19. This was attempted because the company had acquired a used Andover engine that produced 12 horsepower (9 kW) at 4000 rpm. A 1-19 was modified by bolting the engine in pusher configuration over the wing/fuselage junction. The installation was completed with a home-made propeller.

The resulting aircraft displayed disappointing performance. The combination of the low-performance 1-19 and the low-power engine left the aircraft unable to climb out of ground effect. It had a ceiling of ten feet.

During one flight Schweizer test pilot Frank Hurtt was able to find a thermal at ten feet and climbed the aircraft up to 2,000 feet (610 m). Other than one flight where the aircraft was auto-towed with the engine running at full throttle, this was the only time that the altitude achieved exceeded ten feet.

After complaints were received from the airport manager, the 1-19 was converted back to a glider and the project terminated.

The company finally produced a successful motorglider with the Schweizer SGM 2-37, which was first flown in 1982 and of which 12 examples were produced.

== Certification ==
The 1-19 received type certificate G-17 on 19 June 1946. The type certificate is currently held by K & L Soaring of Cayuta, New York. K & L Soaring now provides all parts and support for the Schweizer line of sailplanes.

The 1-20 was never certified in the US and these aircraft are flown there as experimental aircraft. The SGU 1-20 was issued Canadian type certificate G-53 1960-10-27 in the name of Cu Nim Gliding Club of Calgary.

== Variants ==
SGU 1-19
The basic factory produced model was designated as the SGU 1-19.

SGU 1-19A
SGU 1-19s assembled from factory kits were accepted as certified aircraft and were designated as SGU 1-19A. They were otherwise identical to the 1-19.

SGM 1-19
The factory converted one SGU 1-19 to a self-launching motorglider and temporarily designated it as the SGM 1-19 ("M" for "motor"). The project was not a success and the aircraft was de-modified.

SGU 1-20
The 1-20 is the long winged version of the 1-19. One 1-20 was completed and a number of 1-19s were converted to 1-20s by installing longer wings.

== Competitions & Records ==
Distance flying in the 1-19 is challenging, given its 16:1 glide ratio and red-line speed limit of just 75 mph (122 km/h). Jim Hard flew an SGU 1-19 190 miles (308 km) to qualify for a Gold distance and Diamond goal flight.

The prototype 1-20 was soared 138 miles (222 km) by Paul A. Schweizer in 1947.

== In service ==
In May 2008 there were still 25 SGU 1-19s registered in the USA along with one 1-19A and three 1-20s, the factory prototype (serial number 1), and two converted 1-19s.

== Aircraft on display ==
- Iowa Aviation Museum - 1-20
- National Soaring Museum - three 1-19s, including N91806 and Canadian registered CF-ZBE.

== Specifications (1-19) ==
Data from Jane's all the World's Aircraft 1947

General characteristics

- Crew: one
- Length: 20 ft 8 in (6.3 m)
- Wingspan: 36 ft 9 in (11.2 m)
- Height: 10 ft 6 in (3.2 m)
- Wing area: 170 sq ft (16 m^{2})
- Aspect ratio: 12.6
- Airfoil: NACA 43012A
- Empty weight: 320 lb (145 kg)
- Gross weight: 550 lb (249 kg)

Performance

- Stall speed: 28 mph (45 km/h, 24 kn) dual
- Aerotow max speed: 75 mph (65 kn; 121 km/h)
- Never exceed speed: 75 mph (121 km/h, 65 kn)
- Maximum glide ratio: 17:1 at 42 mph (36 kn; 68 km/h)
- Rate of sink: 179 ft/min (0.91 m/s)
- Wing loading: 3.23 lb/sq ft (15.8 kg/m^{2})

== See also ==
Related lists

- List of gliders
