= Nelson H-63 =

American aircraft engine

- Type: Two-stroke aircraft engine
- National origin: United States
- Manufacturer: Nelson Engine Company
- Major applications: Hiller YROE

The Nelson H-63, known in the US military designation system as the YO-65, is an American dual ignition, four-cylinder, horizontally opposed, two-stroke aircraft engine that was developed by the Nelson Engine Company for use in helicopters and light aircraft. The engine designation means horizontally opposed 63 cubic inch displacement.

== Design and development ==
The H-63 was designed in the late 1950s specifically to power the sort of very light single-man helicopters that the US Army was investigating at the time. Application for certification was made on 15 March 1958, and the engine was certified under the CAR 13 standard on 8 February 1960.

Engines were produced for Nelson by the Franklin Engine Company of Syracuse, New York under a production certificate. Originally the type certificate was held by the Nelson Specialty Corporation of San Leandro, California, but it was transferred to Nelson Aircraft of Irwin, Pennsylvania on 15 July 1966. Ownership of the type certificate was transferred to the present owner, Charles R. Rhoades of Naples, Florida, on 14 February 1996.

The four-cylinder engine runs on a 16:1 mixture of 80/87 avgas and SAE 30 outboard motor oil. It is equipped with a single Nelson E-500 carburetor.

== Variants ==
H-63A
42 hp @ 4000 rpm
H-63C
Vertically mounted version for use in helicopters, producing 43 hp (32 kW) at 4000 rpm.
H-63CP
Horizontally mounted version for use in light aircraft, producing 48 hp (36 kW) at 4400 rpm for take-off.
YO-65-2
Military designation for H-63 fitted to the Hiller XROE-1 Rotorcycle

== Applications ==
H-63A

- Goodyear Inflatoplane

H-63C

- Hiller YROE

H-63CP

- Lobet/Shafor Ganagobie

== Engines on display ==
- EAA AirVenture Museum

== Specifications (H-63C) ==
Data from FAA Type Certificate Data Sheet, Aircraft engines of the World 1957

=== General characteristics ===
- Type: Four-cylinder, two-stroke, dual ignition, vertically mounted helicopter engine
- Bore: 2.6875 in (68 mm)
- Stroke: 2.75 in (70 mm)
- Displacement: 63 cubic inches
- Length: 18 in (460 mm)
- Width: 25 in (640 mm)
- Height: 17.5 in (440 mm)
- Dry weight: Bare engine: 53 lb (24 kg) ; 76 lb (34 kg) including the cooling fan, cooling shroud and clutch

=== Components ===
- Valvetrain: 2-stroke valveless
- Fuel system: Nelson E-500 carburetor
- Fuel type: 80/87 avgas
- Oil system: premixed oil in fuel, SAE 30 outboard motor oil mixed at 16:1 fuel to oil
- Cooling system: fan forced air
- Reduction gear: none

=== Performance ===
- Power output: 42 hp (31 kW) at 4000 rpm
- Specific power: 0.67 hp/cu in (30 kW/L)
- Compression ratio: 8:1
- Specific fuel consumption: 0.73 lb/(hp⋅h) (440 g/kWh) (maximum)
- Oil consumption: 0.09 lb/hp/h (0.015 kg/kW/ks) (maximum)
- Power-to-weight ratio: 1.26 lb/hp (0.77 kg/kW)

== See also ==
- List of aircraft engines
