= Schweizer SGS 2-33 =

American training glider

SGS 2-33
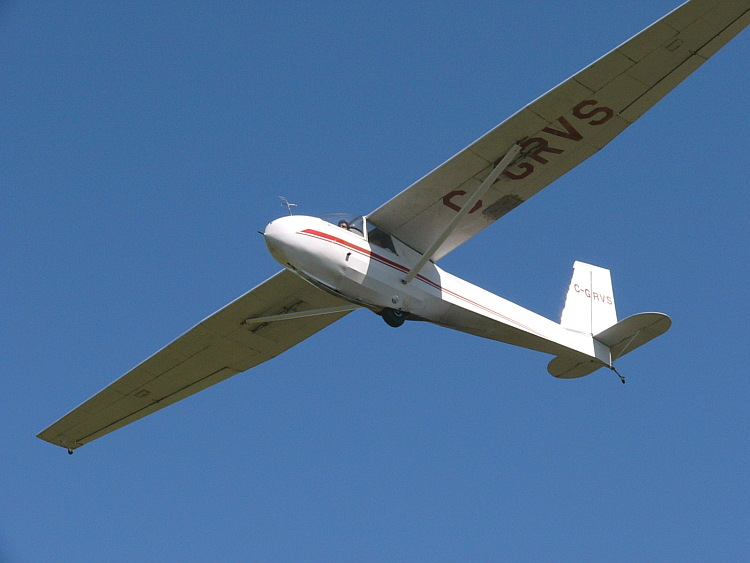

General information
- Type: Training sailplane
- National origin: United States
- Manufacturer: Schweizer Aircraft Corporation
- Designer: Ernest Schweizer
- Status: Production completed
- Primary user: Royal Canadian Air Cadets
- Number built: 579

History
- Manufactured: 1967-1981
- First flight: 1965
- Developed from: Schweizer 2-22

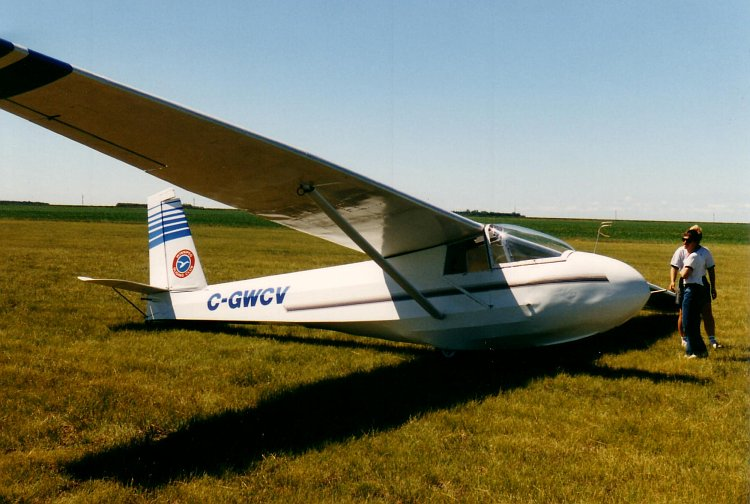
Schweizer SGS 2-33A belonging to The Winnipeg Gliding Club

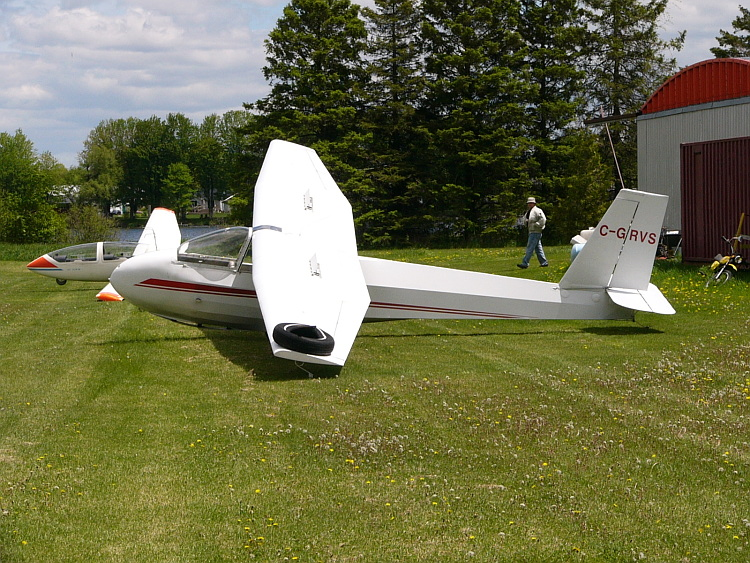
SGS 2-33A showing its semi-tapered wing planform. The tire is used to secure the wing in windy conditions

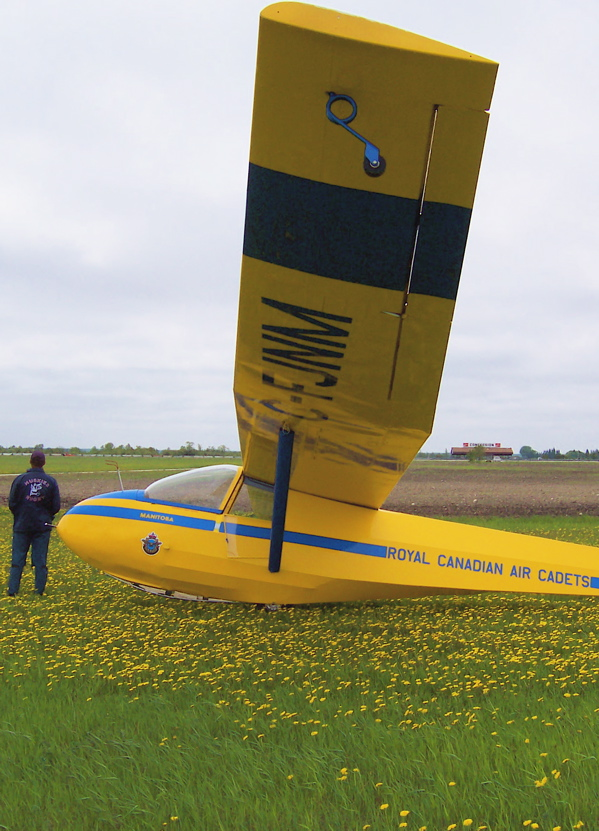
Schweizer SGS 2-33A used for training in the Royal Canadian Air Cadets gliding program

The Schweizer SGS 2-33 is an American two-seat, high-wing, strut-braced, training glider that was built by Schweizer Aircraft of Elmira, New York.

The 2-33 was designed to replace the Schweizer 2-22, from which it was derived. The aircraft first flew in 1965 and production was started in 1967. Production was completed in 1981.

From its introduction until the late 1980s, the 2-33 was the main training glider used in North America.

== Background ==
The SGU 2-22 two-seat training glider was introduced in 1945 and quickly became the most popular training glider in the USA.

By the early 1960s it became obvious to Schweizer Aircraft that a replacement for the 2-22 was needed. At that time the single seat Schweizer SGS 1-26 was becoming very popular for one-design competition flying. The company realized that the new trainer should have similar performance to the 1-26, in order to be used as the 1-26's two seat transition trainer.

SGU 2-22 production was ended at serial number 258 in 1967 to commence production of the new model.

== Development ==
The SGS 2-33, indicating Schweizer Glider, Sailplane, 2 Seats, Model 33, was designed by Ernest Schweizer. The aircraft was a derivative of the 2-22, which in turn was based on the SGU 1-7 single place glider of 1937. The 2-33 retained the 2-22 and 1-7's metal wing, single spar and single strut arrangement.

The 2-33 was manufactured in three variants and remained in production for 14 years. Production was only curtailed when demand dropped off due to the import of higher-performance two-place sailplanes from Europe.

The 2-33 received type certificate G3EA on 10 February 1967.

A number of 2-33s were delivered as kits to the purchaser and designated as SGS 2-33AK. These were accepted by the Federal Aviation Administration as certified aircraft and not amateur-builts, subject to conditions:

Each Model SGS 2-33A glider assembled from a kit is designated Model SGS-2-33AK. These K models will be eligible for an airworthiness certificate when accompanied by an affidavit certifying that the glider is constructed in exact accordance with the approved drawings and manual, and that the parts and materials furnished by the manufacturer in the kit have been used; and further when the following inspections have been satisfactorily passed:

(a) An inspection for workmanship, materials, and conformity before any covering is applied. (All woodwork may be sealed.)
(b) A final inspection of the completed glider.

(c) Check of flight characteristics.

The 2-33 type certificate is currently held by K & L Soaring of Cayuta, New York who now provide all parts and support for the Schweizer line of sailplanes.

== Design ==
The 2-33 was designed to be rugged, easy to maintain and with a high degree of crashworthiness.

The 2-33 has a welded steel tube fuselage covered in aircraft fabric. The single-spar, aluminum structure wings are tapered from mid-span and feature top and bottom balanced divebrakes. The wings are covered in aluminum stressed skin. The tailplane and elevator are made from welded steel tube covered in aircraft fabric. The vertical fin is aluminum stressed skin construction, while the rudder is fabric-covered.

The 2-33 has a fiberglass nose cone and a one-piece molded front canopy. Access to the rear seat is via door on the right-hand side. Instruments are fitted in the front cockpit only. Most 2-33s have a four-position bungee trim system, with aircraft starting with serial number 500 equipped with a "ratchet-lock trim".

== Operational history ==
The United States Air Force Academy operated 13 2-33s as the TG-4A until they were replaced by the TG-10B (L-23 Super Blanik) in 2002. The USAFA TG-4s were all donated to other US government agencies, such as the Civil Air Patrol or to aviation museums.

Under the 1962 United States Tri-Service aircraft designation system the USAF 2-33 was designated as the TG-4A. This can cause confusion with the Laister-Kauffman LK-10A used by the United States Army Air Forces from 1941 to 1947, which was designated under the previous 1924 United States Army Air Service aircraft designation system.

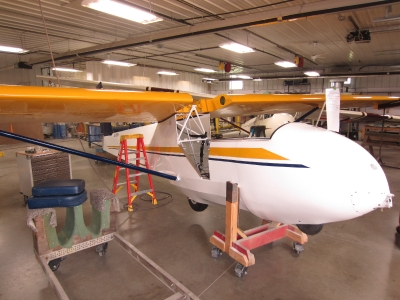
Long Island Soaring 2-33B being built at K&L Soaring

There were 254 SGS 2-33s registered in the US as of November 2017, including:

- 47 SGS 2-33
- 206 SGS 2-33A
- 1 SGS 2-33AK
- 2 SGS 2-33B

There were 93 SGS 2-33s registered in Canada as of November 2017, including:

- 15 SGS 2-33
- 78 SGS 2-33A

== Variants ==
SGS 2-33
The original 2-33 was certified on 10 February 1967 and includes serial numbers 1 to 85.

SGS 2-33A
The "A" model incorporated some minor changes, including a larger rudder with an aerodynamic balance horn. It was certified on 7 March 1968 and includes serial numbers 86 and subsequent. The replacement rudder of the "A" model was available as a retrofit to earlier 2-33s and some have been upgraded to "A" status.

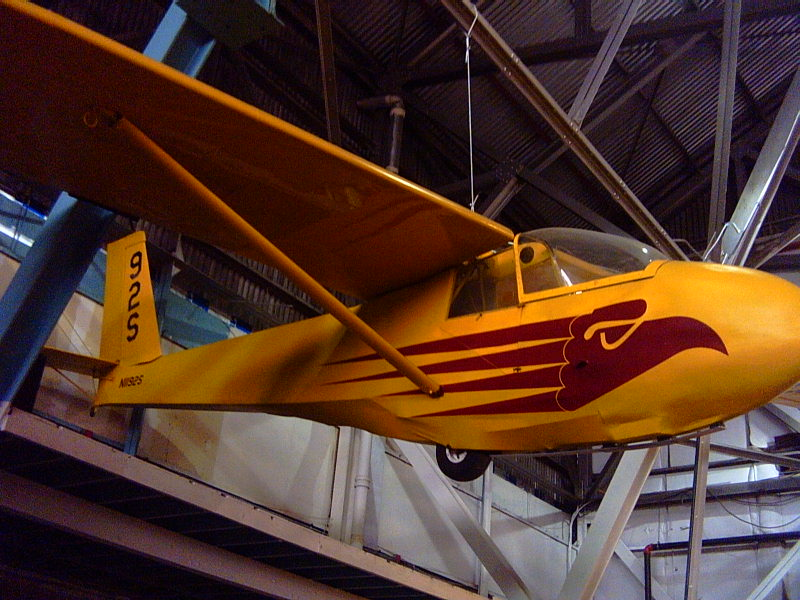
SGS 2-33A at Wings Museum

SGS 2-33AK
The "AK" model was an "A" model completed by the buyer from a kit. It was certified on 19 April 1973.
SGS 2-33B
The B model has an extra 5 inches in the rear seat, a ratchet trim system, a nose wheel, and 40 extra pounds of gross weight. This new 2-33 was certified on 2 February 2022. As of March 2024, two have been delivered. One to Haris Hill Soaring and one to the Long Island Soaring Association.

== Operators ==
The SGS 2-33 remains popular with glider schools, the largest operator is the Air Cadet League of Canada with a fleet of 79 2-33s and 2-33As as of 2022.

The Indonesian Air Force Academy received 3 2-33As in 2009.

== Aircraft on display ==
There is a 2-33A on display at the Wings Over the Rockies Air and Space Museum.

== Specifications ==
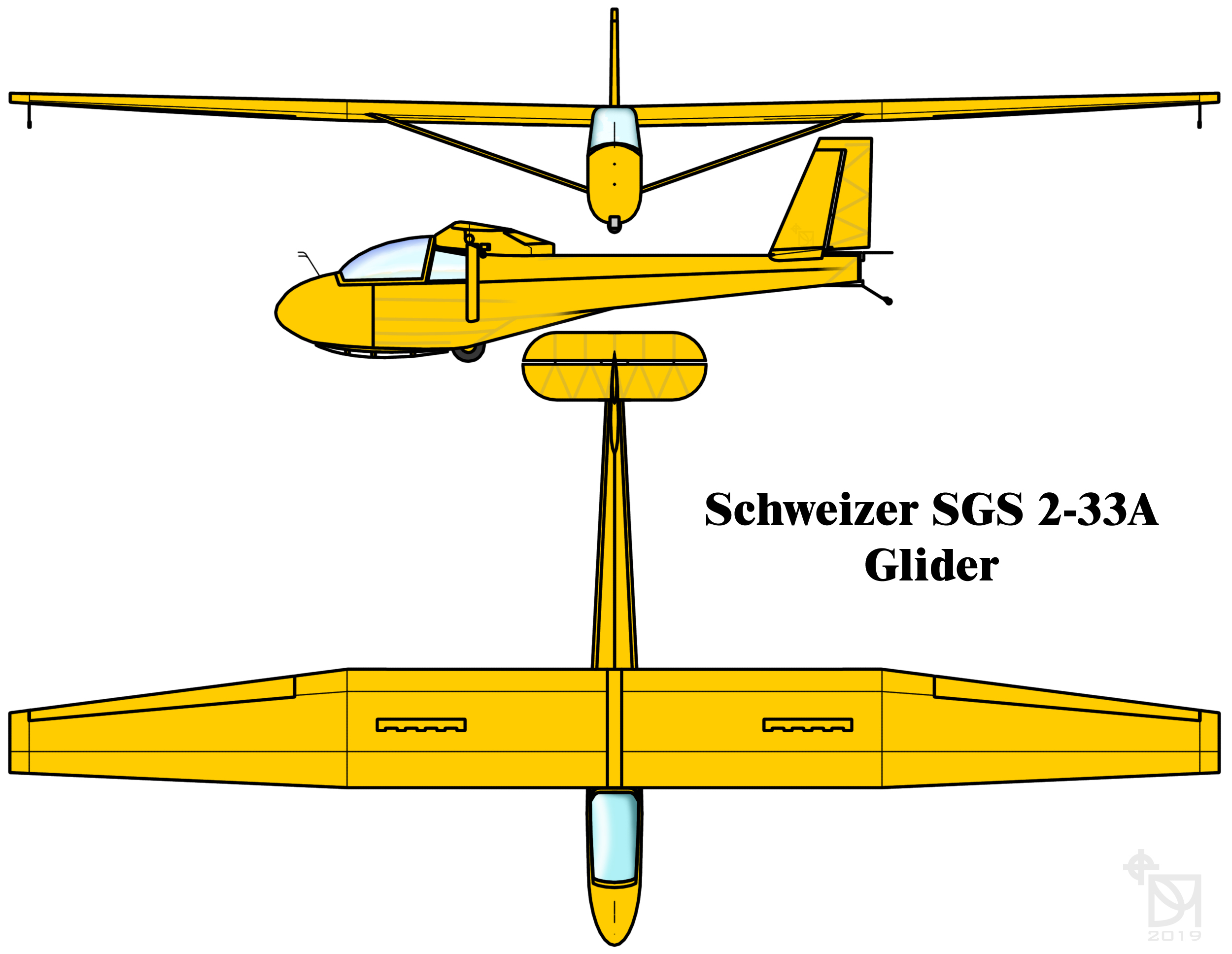
Schweizer SGS 2-33A 3-view drawing

Data from Jane's All the World's Aircraft 1988-89, Pre-Course Information Package for Glider Candidates

General characteristics

- Crew: one
- Capacity: one passenger
- Length: 25 ft 9 in (7.85 m)
- Wingspan: 51 ft 0 in (15.54 m)
- Height: 9 ft 3 in (2.83 m)
- Wing area: 219.5 sq ft (20.39 m^{2})
- Aspect ratio: 11.85:1
- Airfoil: NACA 43012A
- Empty weight: 600 lb (272 kg)
- Max takeoff weight: 1,041 lb (472 kg)

Performance

- Stall speed: 36 mph (57 km/h, 31 kn) dual
- Never exceed speed: 98 mph (157 km/h, 85 kn) in smooth air, rough air and aero-tow
- Max winch-launch speed: 60 kn (110 km/h; 69 mph)
- g limits: +4.67 -2.56
- Maximum glide ratio: 22.25:1
- Best glide speed dual: 45 kn (83 km/h; 52 mph)
- Rate of sink: 187 ft/min (0.95 m/s) dual
- Minimum sink speed: 37 kn (69 km/h; 43 mph)
- Wing loading: 4.74 lb/sq ft (23.14 kg/m^{2}) max

== See also ==
Related lists

- List of gliders
