= Baker-McMillan Cadet =

American glider

Cadet
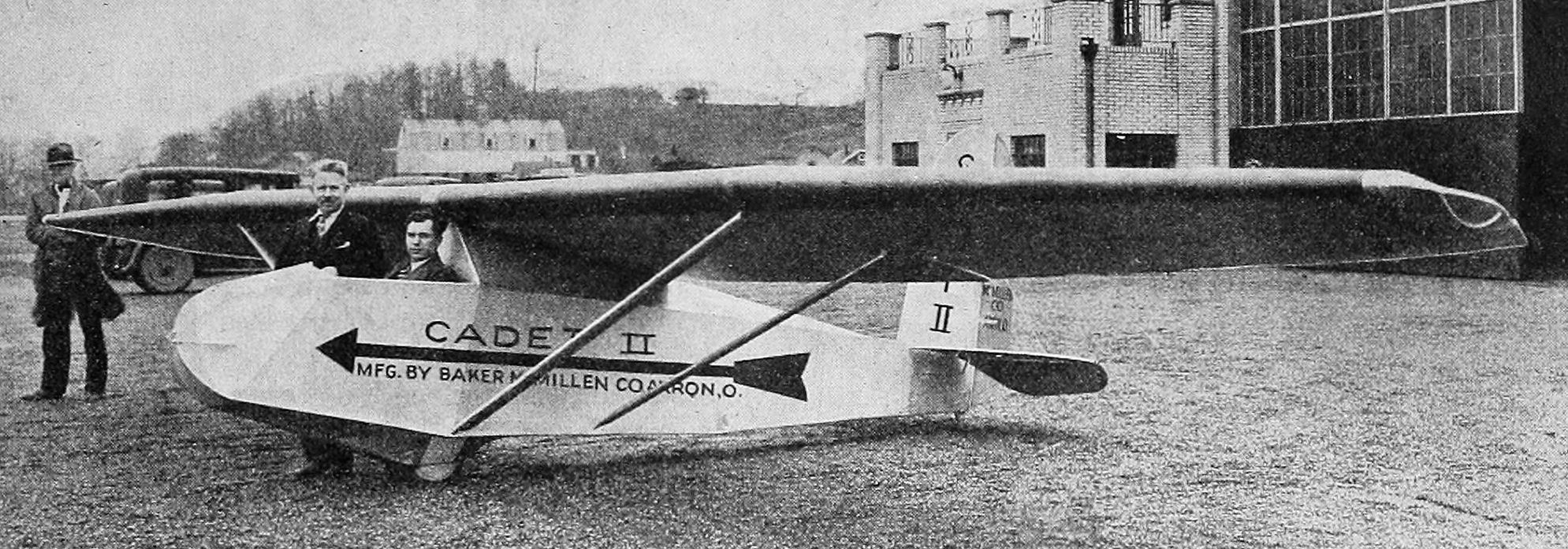
- Cadet II

General information
- Type: Glider
- National origin: United States
- Manufacturer: Baker-McMillan
- Designer: Frank R. Gross
- Status: Production completed
- Primary user: Mostly gliding clubs
- Number built: at least 30

History
- Manufactured: 1929-circa 1930
- Introduction date: 1929
- First flight: 1929

The Baker-McMillan Cadet is an American, high-wing, strut-braced, open-cockpit, single-seat glider that was designed in 1929 by Frank R. Gross and produced by Baker-McMillan (Different sources variously spell the company name Baker-MacMillen, Baker Macmillen or Baker MacMillen).

== Design and development ==
The Cadet was designed by Dr. Gross, a former member of the Akaflieg Darmstadt, in 1929 as an improvement over the primary gliders then in use and as an aircraft that would offer soaring capability.

The Cadet is built with a steel tube fuselage and a wooden wing that is supported by dual parallel struts, with jury struts. The tail is a wire-braced wooded structure. The whole aircraft is covered in doped aircraft fabric covering.

At least 30 and perhaps as many as 40 Cadets were constructed.

== Operational history ==
The Cadet was the first glider to be flown at Elmira, New York after Wolfgang Klemperer, Warren Eaton and Earl Southee surveyed the area and determined it had potential for soaring flights. One flight was flown by Jack O'Meara, a factory pilot for Baker-McMillan, who had a flight of one hour and 38 minutes from Elmira's South Mountain.

One Cadet was flown from water on twin floats. On another occasion four Cadets were towed aloft at the same time and released by a Goodyear Blimp over Akron, Ohio.

In March 2011 two Cadets remained on the Federal Aviation Administration registry.

== Aircraft on display ==
- National Soaring Museum - 1
- Thermal G Museum, Waterford, Pennsylvania - 1

== Specifications (Cadet) ==
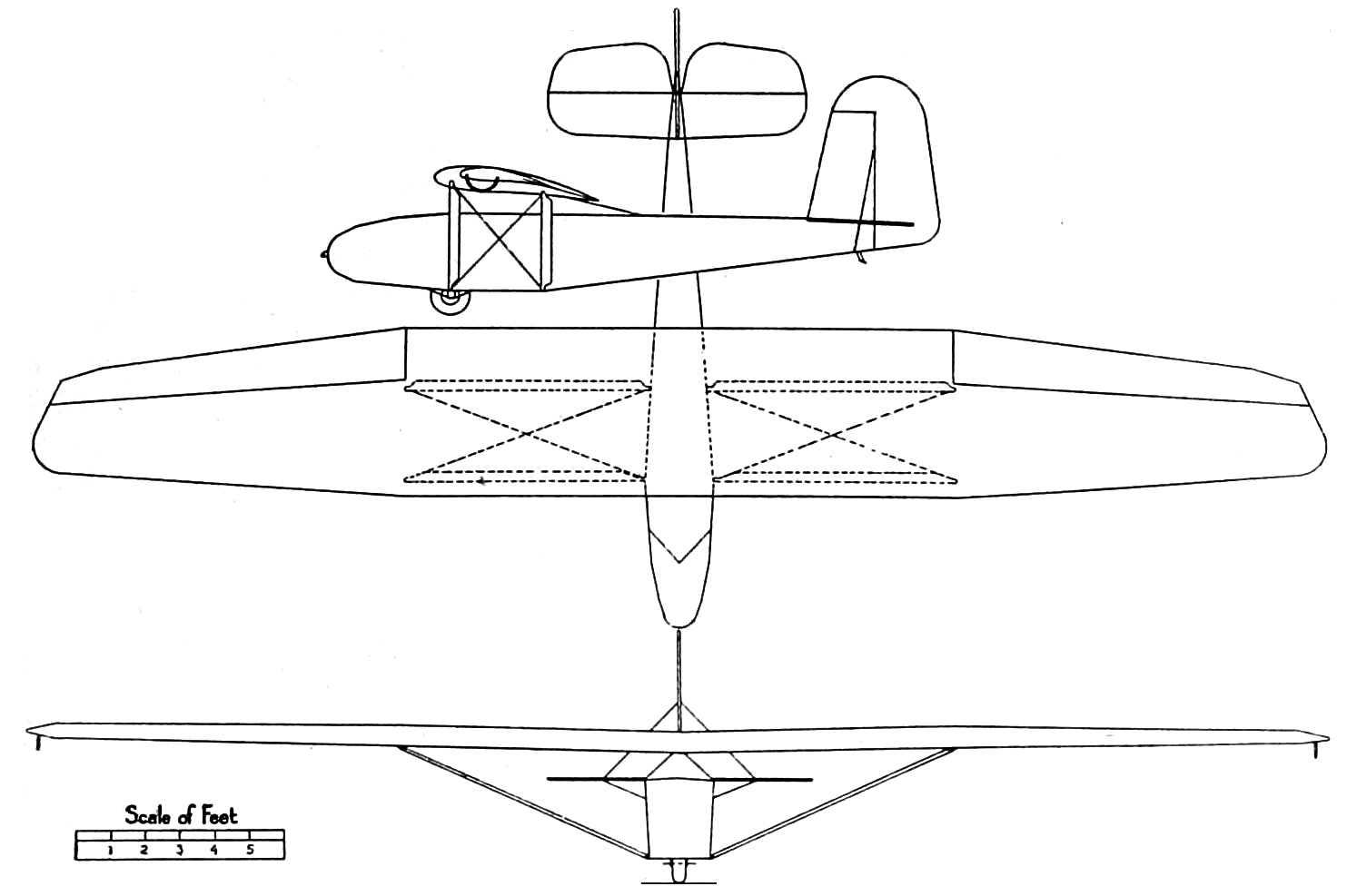
Baker-McMillen Cadet II 3-view drawing from Aero Digest October,1930

Data from Sailplane Directory and Soaring

General characteristics

- Crew: one
- Wingspan: 37 ft 6 in (11.43 m)
- Wing area: 162 sq ft (15.1 m^{2})
- Aspect ratio: 8.7:1
- Empty weight: 230 lb (104 kg)
- Gross weight: 410 lb (186 kg)

Performance

- Maximum glide ratio: 15:1
- Rate of sink: 210 ft/min (1.1 m/s)

== See also ==
- List of gliders
