= Schweizer SGU 2-22 =

American glider

SGU 2-22
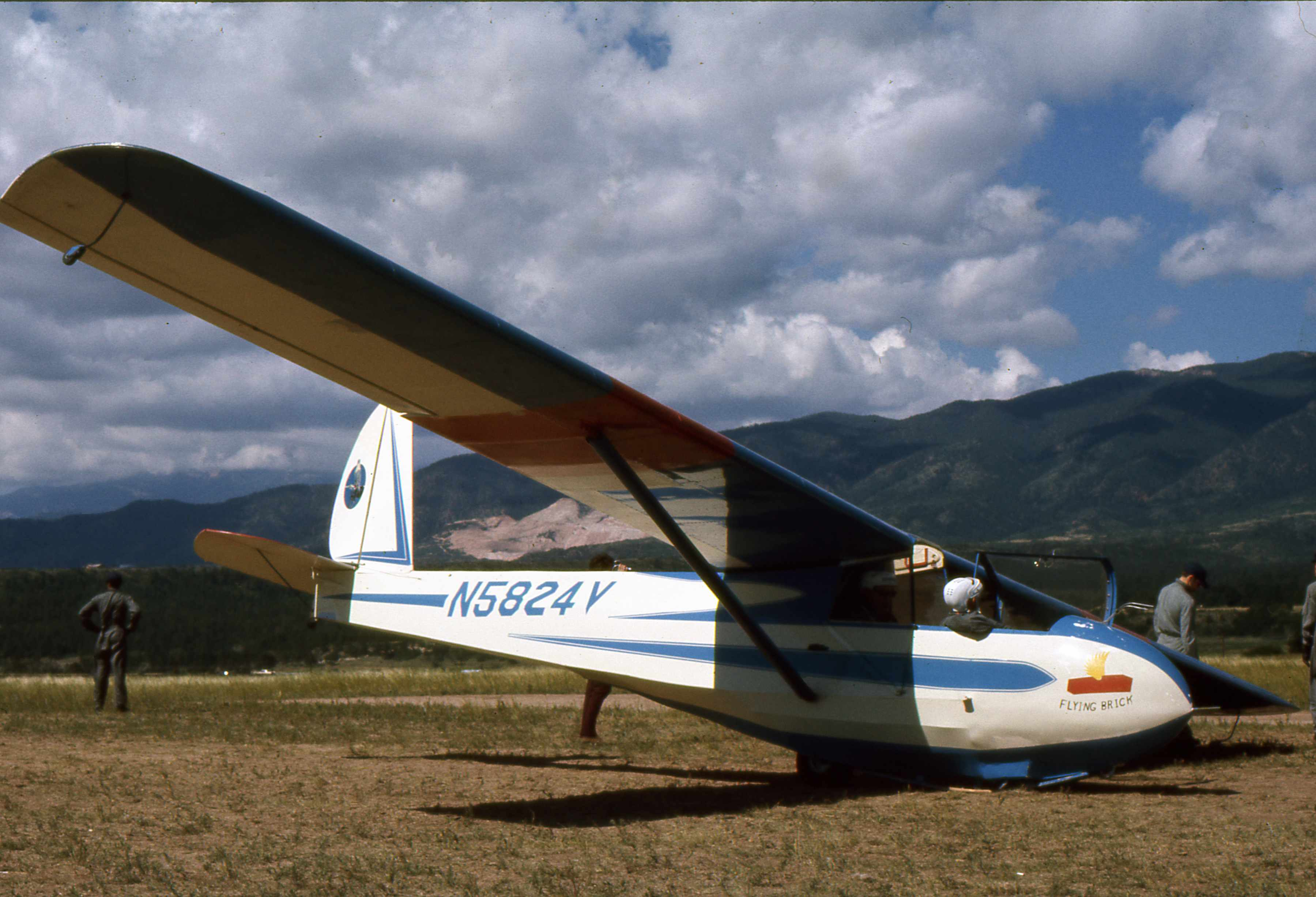
- A Schweizer 2-22E (TG-2) of the US Air Force Academy

General information
- Type: Training sailplane
- National origin: United States
- Manufacturer: Schweizer Aircraft Corporation
- Designer: Ernest Schweizer
- Number built: 258

History
- First flight: March 1946

The Schweizer SGU 2-22 is an American two-seat, high-wing, strut-braced, training glider built by Schweizer Aircraft of Elmira, New York.

The 2-22 was designed to replace the two-place training gliders surplussed at the end of World War II . Production was started in 1946 and it was produced until 1967, when it was superseded by an improved version, the SGS 2-33. From the 1940s until the 1960s it was the most numerous two-place training glider in the USA.

== Design and development ==
The end of World War Two resulted in a large number of military training gliders being sold as surplus. These included Frankfort TG-1s, Schweizer TG-2s and Schweizer TG-3s. Most of the surplus gliders sold were not ideal trainers for ab initio civilian student flying, as they had high wing loadings and faster stall speeds. This made them suitable for aerotow, but not for winch or auto-tow launches. Furthermore, many of these surplus two-place gliders had poor visibility from the rear seat where the instructor sat. Due to restrictions on the use of aluminum in training aircraft, many surplus gliders had wooden wings, making them unsuitable to be kept outdoors on tie-downs.

Schweizer Aircraft decided to design a two-place trainer that would address these deficiencies and provide a trainer that was easy to fly and would be easy for students to progress quickly on. The new two-place was intended to be a complement to the single-place training glider then in production, the SGU 1-19.

The SGU 2-22, indicating Schweizer Glider, Utility, 2 Seats, Model 22, was designed by Ernest Schweizer. The aircraft was based on the SGU 1-7 single place glider of 1937. It used the 1-7's metal wing, single spar and single strut arrangement. The prototype 2-22 was flown in March, 1946. To gain publicity for the new design company test pilot Frank Hurtt and company engineer Dick Powell used the prototype to set a new two-place duration record of 10 hours 9 minutes on April 10, 1946. The 2-22 was produced in seven variants and remained in production for 21 years. Production was only curtailed when the Schweizer SGS 2-33 was put into production as a replacement. The 2-33 was essentially a refined 2-22, incorporating a longer semi-tapered wing.

The 2-22 has a welded steel tube fuselage covered in aircraft fabric. The single-spar, constant-chord aluminum structure wings feature spoilers on the top surface only and are covered in aircraft fabric. The tail surfaces are made from welded steel tube covered in aircraft fabric.

The 2-22 received type certificate G-18 on 4 October 1946. The type certificate is currently held by K & L Soaring of Cayuta, New York who now provide all parts and support for the Schweizer line of sailplanes.

A number of 2-22s were delivered as kits to the purchaser. These were accepted by the Federal Aviation Administration as certified aircraft and not amateur-builts, subject to conditions:

Each Model SGU 2-22C or SGU 2-22E glider assembled from a kit is designated Model SGU 2-22CK or SGU 2-22EK, respectively. These K models will be eligible for an airworthiness certificate when accompanied by an affidavit certifying that the glider is constructed in exact accordance with the approved drawings and manual, and that the parts and materials furnished by the manufacturer in the kit have been used; and further when the following inspections have been satisfactorily passed:

(a) An inspection for workmanship, materials, and conformity before any covering is applied. (All woodwork may be sealed.)
(b) A final inspection of the completed glider.

(c) Check of flight characteristics.

== Variants ==
SGU 2-22

The original 2-22 is referred to as a "standard". It featured a 450 lb (204 kg) empty weight and an 830 lb (376 kg) gross weight. The aircraft had a windshield, but no canopy, rear windows or door. Fifty-one "standards" were built. The type was certified on 4 October 1946.

SGU 2-22A

The "A" model was a re-design to meet the requirements of the United States Air Force Academy. It incorporated a lengthened nose and a full canopy, along with a gross weight increase to 900 lbs (408 kg). It was certified on 24 May 1957. A total of three were completed.

SGU 2-22B

The "B" model was a "standard" with the gross weight increased to 900 lbs (408 kg). It was certified on 24 May 1957.

SGU 2-22C

The "C" model incorporated the changes from the "A" and "B" models and also introduced smaller ailerons. It was certified on 24 May 1957 and 103 were built.

SGU 2-22CK

The "CK" model was a "C" model completed by the buyer from a kit. Twenty-eight "CK" kits were completed.

SGU 2-22E

The "E" model was the last production model and incorporated larger spoilers, a bigger cockpit, a new-design canopy and changes to the wing root to allow a skylight to be fitted. The "E" was certified on 10 April 1963.

SGU 2-22EK

The "EK" was the kit version of the "E" model. The "EK" was certified on 7 February 1964.

== Operational history ==
Aside from the 2-22As that were delivered to USAFA, later model 2-22s were also supplied to the USAF and a number were supplied as foreign aid to Indonesia.

Distance flying in the 2-22 is challenging, given its 17:1 glide ratio. One 2-22 was flown by Al Parker 200 miles (324 km) to complete a Gold distance and Diamond goal leg.

There is a running trophy between the Caesar Creek Soaring Club (formerly Soaring Society of Dayton) and the Central Ohio Soaring Association, called the "What Can You Do In A Schweizer 2-22". There used to be many flights between the two clubs in their 2-22's to pass the trophy back and forth. The last time the trophy switched clubs was in the 1990's, and it has remained at Caesar Creek since then, still hung on a wall in their clubhouse.

In May 2008 there were still 123 SGU 2-22s registered in the USA. These included:

- 2-22 - 19
- 2-22A - 1
- 2-22B - 0
- 2-22C - 28
- 2-22CK - 14
- 2-22E - 55
- 2-22EK - 6

== Aircraft on display ==
- US Southwest Soaring Museum

== Specifications (SGU 2-22) ==
Data from Jane's all the World's Aircraft 1947

General characteristics

- Crew: 2
- Length: 25 ft 0 in (7.63 m)
- Wingspan: 43 ft 0 in (13.1 m)
- Wing area: 210 sq ft (20 m^{2})
- Aspect ratio: 8.81
- Airfoil: NACA 43012A
- Empty weight: 450 lb (204 kg)
- Gross weight: 830 lb (376 kg)

Performance

- Maximum speed: 89 mph (143 km/h, 77 kn)
- Stall speed: 30 mph (48 km/h, 26 kn) dual
- Aerotow max speed: 89 mph (77 kn; 143 km/h)
- Winch launch max speed: 66 mph (57 kn; 106 km/h)
- Maximum glide ratio: 18:1 at 47 mph (41 kn; 76 km/h)
- Rate of sink: 179 ft/min (0.91 m/s) dual
- Wing loading: 3.95 lb/sq ft (19.3 kg/m^{2}) dual

== See also ==
Aircraft of comparable role, configuration, and era

- Schleicher Ka-4 Rhönlerche II
- SZD-10 Czapla

Related lists

- List of gliders
