= Nelson Aircraft =

American aircraft and engine manufacturer

Nelson Aircraft Corporation
- Industry: Aerospace
- Founded: 1945
- Headquarters: San Fernando, California, United States
- Key people: Ted Nelson; William Hawley Bowlus
- Products: Motor gliders Aero engines

The Nelson Aircraft Corporation was founded in 1945 by sailplane pilot Ted Nelson and sailplane designer William Hawley Bowlus in San Fernando, California.

Bowlus and Nelson formed the Nelson Aircraft Corporation to build a two-seat, motor glider version of the popular Bowlus BA-100 Baby Albatross. The designers nicknamed this design the Bumblebee but they sold the powered glider under the official moniker, Dragonfly.

== Designs ==
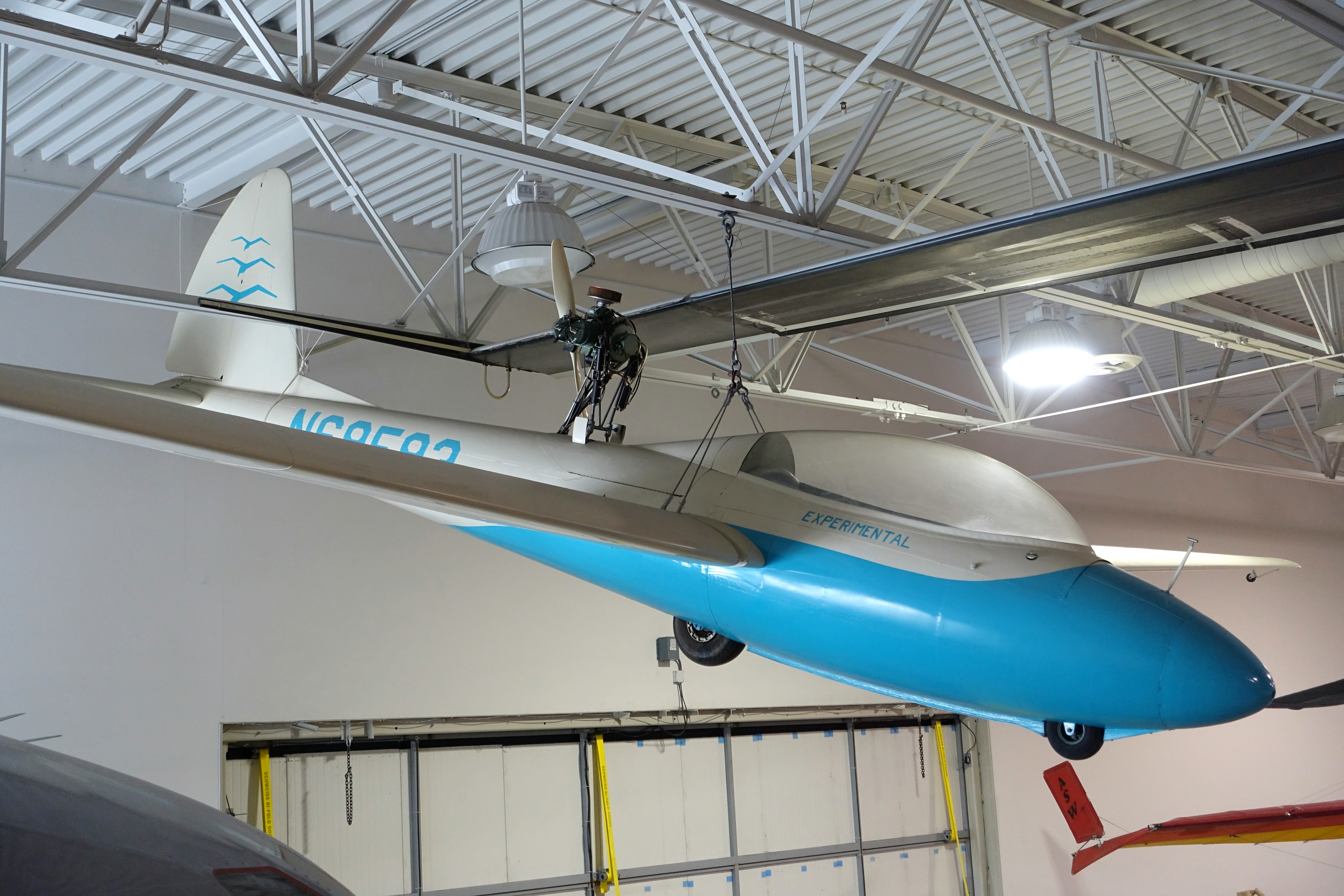
Nelson Hummingbird PG-185B

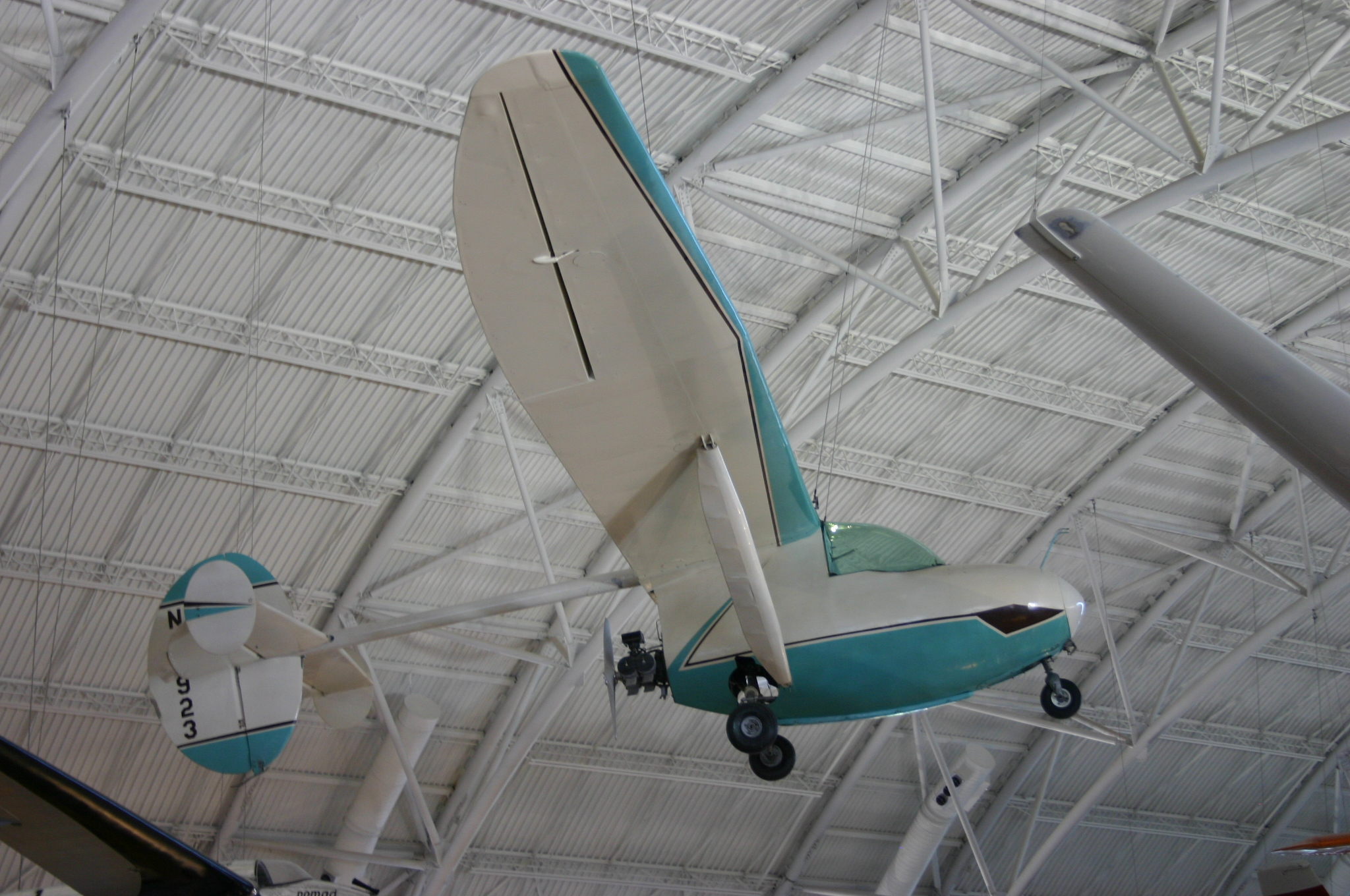
BB-1 Dragonfly

The first Nelson-Bowlus glider was the Nelson Bumblebee with a pod-and-boom fuselage two-seat powered sailplane [NX1955]. The Bumblebee in 1945-46 was built with a Righter O-45 16-hp four-cylinder engine. The prototype Bumblebee had a fully retractable tricycle landing gear, operated manually by the pilot. The nose gear was steerable with miniature shimmy dampeners and a lock. The rear wheels had a special cam action so that they could be tucked away in the fuselage at the proper angle. The rear wheels also had independent internally expanding brakes, designed by Bowlus, which facilitated taxiing on the ground. The high pitch sound of the engine caused Bowlus and Nelson to name it the "Bumblebee." A three-gallon gas tank fed the pusher type engine allowing it to fly for an hour and a half under full throttle, cruising at 75 mph. Tests were made which determined the engine was under-powered, producing about 16 horsepower at 3500 rpm, not enough for adequate flight, although Bowlus claimed it would climb 300 feet per minute to an altitude suitable for soaring. The men decided to build a suitable engine of their own design from scratch that was used for the later production models. Their new motor generated 25 horsepower, just enough power for takeoff and a slow climb.

Nelson Aircraft then developed their own 25-28 hp four-cylinder, two-stroke H-44 and H-49 engines. These engines were used for a limited production version of the BB-1 Bumblebee called the BB-1 Dragonfly.

The experimental Nelson Bumblebee was a strut-braced, high wing, Bowlus Baby Albatross glider design which was altered by widening the cockpit and adding a plexiglass bubble to improve visibility. The Nelson Dragonfly version added vertical stabilizers mounted on the ends of the horizontal stabilizer. The motorglider had side-by-side seating with flight controls for each occupant.

== Aircraft ==
Summary of aircraft built by Nelson Aircraft
Model name	First flight	Number built	Type
Nelson Bumblebee	1946	1	Motor glider
Nelson Dragonfly	1947	7	Motor glider
Nelson Hummingbird	1953	7	Motor glider

== Engines ==
Summary of engines built by Nelson Aircraft
Model name	Introduced	Type
Nelson H-44	1945	4-cylinder, 2-stroke, 25 hp at 3,900 rpm
Nelson H-49	1949	4-cylinder, 2-stroke, 28 hp at 4,000 rpm
Nelson H-59	1953	4-cylinder; 2-stroke, 40 hp at 4,000 rpm
Nelson H-63	1958	4-cylinder; 2-stroke; 43 hp at 4,000 rpm
