= Nelson H-44 =

American aircraft engine

- Type: Two-stroke aircraft engine
- National origin: United States
- Manufacturer: Nelson Engine Company
- Designer: Ted Nelson
- Major applications: Bowlus/Nelson Dragonfly
- Manufactured: c. 1947

The Nelson H-44 is an American single ignition, four-cylinder, horizontally opposed, direct drive, two-stroke aircraft engine that was developed by the Nelson Engine Company for use in motorgliders.

== Design and development ==
The H-44 was designed in the period following the Second World War and a specially designed motor glider was created by Hawley Bowlus to utilize the engine, the Bowlus/Nelson Dragonfly.

The engine was not certified. Under the CAR 5 regulations then in place in the US for gliders, a certified auxiliary power glider could be flown with a non-certified engine and propeller. The engine is instead described on the Dragonfly type certificate.

The four-cylinder engine runs on a 12:1 mixture of 80 octane gasoline and SAE 30 oil. It is equipped with a single Carter WA1 carburetor and a recoil starter.

== Operational history ==
Employed in the Dragonfly the H-44 proved underpowered, which led to the design of the H-49 version. The engine family was not a success and few were produced.

== Variants ==
H-44
Original design with a 2.25 in (57 mm) bore and 2.75 in (70 mm) stroke, producing 25 hp (19 kW) at 3900 rpm.
H-49
Upgraded design with E-225 cylinders giving a 2.375 in (60 mm) bore and 2.75 in (70 mm) stroke, producing 28 hp (21 kW) at 4000 rpm.

== Applications ==
- Bowlus/Nelson Dragonfly

== Specifications (H-44) ==
Data from FAA Type Certificate Data Sheet

=== General characteristics ===
- Type: Four-cylinder, two-stroke, single-ignition aircraft engine
- Bore: 2.25 in (57 mm)
- Stroke: 2.75 in (70 mm)
- Displacement: 44 cubic inches
- Dry weight: 40 lb (18 kg)
- Designer: Ted Nelson

=== Components ===
- Fuel system: Carter WA1 carburetor
- Fuel type: 80 octane gasoline
- Oil system: premixed oil in fuel, SAE 30 oil mixed at 12:1 fuel to oil
- Cooling system: air
- Reduction gear: none

=== Performance ===
- Power output: 25 hp (19 kW) at 3900 rpm
- Compression ratio: 9:1

== See also ==
- List of aircraft engines
