= List of aircraft (Ai–Am) =

This is a list of aircraft in alphabetical order beginning with the letters 'Ai' through 'Am'.

== Ai–Am ==
=== Aichi ===
(Aichi Tokei Denki Kabushiki Kaisha - Aichi Watch and Electric Machinery Company Ltd. / Aichi Kokuki Kabushiki Kaisha - Aichi Aircraft Company Ltd.)

- Aichi AB-1
- Aichi AB-2
- Aichi AB-3
- Aichi AB-4
- Aichi AB-5
- Aichi AB-6
- Aichi AB-7
- Aichi AB-8
- Aichi AB-9
- Aichi AB-10
- Aichi AB-11
- Aichi AB-12
- Aichi AB-13
- Aichi AB-14
- Aichi AM-7
- Aichi AM-10
- Aichi AM-15
- Aichi AM-16
- Aichi AM-17
- Aichi AM-19
- Aichi AM-20
- Aichi AM-21
- Aichi AM-22
- Aichi AM-23
- Aichi AM-24
- Aichi B7A Ryusei
- Aichi C4A(Aichi Navy Experimental 13-Shi High-speed Land-based Reconnaissance Aircraft)
- Aichi D1A
- Aichi D2A
- Aichi D3A
- Aichi E2A
- Aichi E3A
- Aichi E8A
- Aichi E10A
- Aichi E11A
- Aichi E12A
- Aichi E13A
- Aichi E16A
- Aichi F1A
- Aichi H9A
- Aichi M6A Seiran
- Aichi M6A1-K Nanzan
- Aichi S1A Denko
- Aichi Experimental Type 15-Ko Reconnaissance Seaplane (Mi-go)
- Aichi Experimental Three-seat Reconnaissance Seaplane
- Aichi Experimental AB-2 Catapult-launched Reconnaissance Seaplane
- Aichi Experimental AB-3 Single-seat Reconnaissance Seaplane
- Aichi Experimental AB-5 Three-seat Reconnaissance Seaplane
- Aichi Navy Experimental 6-shi Night Reconnaissance Seaplane
- Aichi Navy Experimental 7-shi Carrier Torpedo Attacker
- Aichi Navy Experimental 7-shi Reconnaissance Seaplane
- Aichi Navy Experimental 8-shi Reconnaissance Seaplane
- Aichi Navy Experimental 8-shi Carrier Dive Bomber
- Aichi Navy Experimental 9-shi Night Reconnaissance Seaplane
- Aichi Navy Experimental 10-shi Observation Aircraft
- Aichi Navy Experimental 11-shi Carrier Dive Bomber
- Aichi Navy Experimental 11-shi Night Reconnaissance Seaplane
- Aichi Navy Experimental 12-shi Two-Seat Reconnaissance Seaplane
- Aichi Navy Experimental 12-shi Three-Seat Reconnaissance Seaplane
- Aichi Navy Experimental 13-shi Anti-Submarine and Training Flying Boat
- Aichi Navy Experimental 13-Shi High-speed Reconnaissance Aircraft
- Aichi Navy Experimental 16-shi Carrier Torpedo Attacker Ryusei
- Aichi Navy Experimental 16-shi Carrier Reconnaissance Plane Zuiun
- Aichi Navy Experimental 18-shi Night Fighter Denko
- Aichi Navy Experimental 18-shi Reconnaissance Plane Keiun
- Aichi Navy Type 90-1 Reconnaissance Seaplane
- Aichi Navy Type 94 Carrier Bomber
- Aichi Navy Type 96 Carrier Bomber
- Aichi Navy Type 96 Night Reconnaissance Seaplane
- Aichi Navy Type 98 Reconnaissance Seaplane
- Aichi Navy Type 99 Carrier Bomber
- Aichi Navy Type 0 Reconnaissance Floatplane
- Aichi Navy Type 2 Single-seat Reconnaissance Seaplane
- Aichi Navy Type 2 Two-seat Reconnaissance Seaplane
- Aichi Navy Type 2 Training Flying Boat
- Aichi Navy Type 2 Transport
- Aichi Navy Type H Carrier Fighter
- Aichi Navy Carrier Attack Bomber Ryusei
- Aichi Navy Reconnaissance Seaplane Zuiun
- Aichi Navy Special Attack Bomber Seiran
- Aichi Navy Special Attack Training Bomber Nanzan
- Aichi Navy Carrier Torpedo Attacker Ryusei Kai

=== AIDC ===
(漢翔航空工業股份有限公司 - Aerospace Industrial Development Corporation)

- AIDC AT-3 Tzu-Chiang
- AIDC F-CK-1A Ching-kuo
- AIDC F-CK-1B Ching-kuo
- AIDC F-CK-1C Hsiang Sheng
- AIDC F-CK-1D Hsiang Sheng
- AIDC PL-1
- AIDC T-CH-1
- AIDC XC-2
- AIDC XAT-5 Blue Magpie

=== Aiglon ===
(Société Aiglon)

- Aiglon Roulier

=== AII ===
(Aviation Industries of Iran)

- AII AVA-505 Thunder
- AII IR-H5
- Zafar 300
- IRGC Shahed 274

=== AIL ===
(Aeronautical Industries of Louisiana, Monroe, LA)

- AIL B-3A
- AIL Express

=== Aimé-Salmson ===
(Emannuel Aimé & Émile Salmson)

- Aimé-Salmson 1909 Autoplane

=== Air & Space ===
(Air & Space Mfg Inc, Muncie, IN)

- Air & Space 18A Heliplane
- Air & Space 18A Flymobil

=== Air Boss ===
(Southern Aircraft Corp)

- Air Boss 1928 Biplane

=== Air Capital ===
(Air Capital Mfg Co.)

- Watkins SL-1

=== Air Command ===
(Air Command International, Caddo Mills, TX)

- Air Command Commander
- Air Command Commander 147A
- Air Command Commander Elite
- Air Command Commander Side-By-Side
- Air Command Commander Sport
- Air Command Commander Tandem
- Air Command Single Place
- Air Command Tandem

=== Air Copter ===
(Lherm, France)

- Air Copter A3C

=== Air Creation ===
(Air Creation SARL)

- Air Creation GT
  - Air Creation GT-BI
  - Air Creation Kiss 400 GTE 582
  - Air Creation Kiss 450 GTE 582
  - Air Creation Mild GTE 582 Float
  - Air Creation XP-12 Buggy 582 SL
  - Air Creation MILD-GTE 503 SL
  - Air Creation MILD-GTE 582
  - Air Creation XP-GTE 582 SL
  - Air Creation XP-Buggy
- Air Creation Clipper
  - Air Creation iXess Clipper 582
  - Air Creation XP-17 Clipper 912
- Air Creation Pixel
- Air Creation Racer
  - Air Creation Fun Racer
  - Air Creation XP Racer
- Air Creation Tanarg
- Air Creation Twin
- Air Creation Skypper
- Air Creation Racer

=== Air Department ===
(Admiralty Air Department)

- AD Flying Boat - built by Supermarine
- AD Navyplane - built by Supermarine
- AD Scout - built by Blackburn and by Hewlett and Blondeau
- AD Seaplane Type 1000 - built by J. Samuel White

=== Air Energy ===
- Air Energy AE-1 Silent

=== Air Est Services ===
(Air Est Services, France)

- Air Est Goeland
- Air Est JCD 03 Pelican

=== Air Force Aircraft Manufacturing Factory ===
(Chinese Republic)

- Chu XP-0
- Chu XP-1
- Chu XP-2
- Chu Hummingbird Model A
- Chu Hummingbird Model B
- Chu D-2

=== Air Leader ===
(Air Leader Airplane Co, Floral Park, NY)

- Air Leader 1926 Monoplane

=== Air Magic Ultralights ===
(Houston, Texas)

- Air Magic Spitfire
- Air Magic Spitfire II

=== Air Nova ===
(Air Nova (Pty.) Ltd. / Dr. Maitland Reed, J.H. Rautenbach, H.G. Brown & G.P.M. Stege)

- Air Nova Reed Falcon

=== Air Products Company ===
- Air Products Aircoupe

=== Air Quest International ===
(see: Zalazar)

=== Air Roamer ===
(George Maves & Jimmie Watkins, Clover Field, Santa Monica, CA)

- Air Roamer 1928 Monoplane

=== Air Scooter ===
- AirScooter II

=== Air Sports ===
(Air Sports Aircrafts [sic] Gmbh and Co KG, Wellersen, Germany)

- Air Sports AIRector 120

=== Air Sylphe ===
(Villereau, Nord, France)

- Air Sylphe 447
- Air Sylphe Bi 582

=== Air Tractor ===
(Air Tractor Inc (pres: Leland Snow), Olney, TX)

- Air Tractor AT-301
- Air Tractor AT-302
- Air Tractor AT-400
- Air Tractor AT-401
- Air Tractor AT-402
- Air Tractor AT-501
- Air Tractor AT-502
- Air Tractor AT-503
- Air Tractor AT-602
- Air Tractor AT-802

=== Air Transport ===
see General-Western

=== Air-Craft ===
(Air-Craft Corp of America, Portland, IN)

- Air-Craft Falcon

=== Air-Istocrat ===
(United States Aircraft Corp, 76 Nelson St, New Brunswick, NJ)

- Air-istocrat SP-7
- Air-istocrat SR-4
- Air-istocrat SR-5

=== Air-Metal ===
(Air-Metal Flugzeugbau und Entwicklungs GmbH & Co Betrieb KG)

- Air-Metal AMZ-102T
- Air-Metal AM-C 111

=== Air-Row ===
(American Aircraft Corp, Chicago, IL)

- Air-Row Arrow B-7

=== Air-space ===
- Air-space CTSW

=== Air-Sport ===
(Zakopane, Poland)

- Air-Sport Aeolus
- Air-Sport Ajos
- Air-Sport Altus
- Air-Sport Buran
- Air-Sport Chinook
- Air-Sport Daedalus
- Air-Sport Euros
- Air-Sport Fen
- Air-Sport Lahotse
- Air-Sport Notos
- Air-Sport Notosie
- Air-Sport Pasat

=== Air-Sud-Ouest ===
- Air-Sud-Ouest 1070 Griffon

=== Airbet ===
(Airbet Serveis Aeronautics, Barcelona, Spain)

- Airbet Girabet Classic
- Airbet Girabet 582
- Airbet Girabet 2
- Airbet Girabet 2 Sport

=== Airborne Windsports ===
(Redhead, New South Wales, Australia)

- Airborne Edge
- Airborne Edge 582 Executive
- Airborne Edge X 503 Wizard
- Airborne Classic S
- Airborne Edge X TS-912
- Airborne Edge Streak II XT
- Airborne X-Series Classic
- Airborne Classic
- Airborne Outback
- Airborne Redback
- Airborne Redback Wizard
- Airborne X-Series Redback
- Airborne XT
- Airborne XT-912 Streak 2
- Airborne XT912-SST Tundra
- Airborne XT-912 Tundra
- Airborne XT-912 Tourer
- Airborne XT-912 Outback
- Airborne XT-582 Tourer
- Airborne XT-582 Tundra
- Airborne XT-582 Outback
- Airborne T-Lite
- Airborne V-Lite
- Airborne Sting
- Airborne Climax
- Airborne Climax C2 13
- Airborne Climax C2 14
- Airborne Climax C4
- Airborne Fun

=== Airbridge ===
(Moscow, Russia)

- Airbridge Cruiser Suzuki
- Airbridge Fregat-Hydro

=== Airbus ===
(Airbus industrie - part of EADS, now Airbus Group)

- EADS CASA C-295 AEW
- Airbus A220
- Airbus A300
- Airbus A300-600ST
- Airbus A310
  - Airbus A310 MRTT
  - Airbus CC-150 Polaris Canadian Armed Forces
- Airbus A318
- Airbus A319
  - Airbus A319CJ
- Airbus A320
- Airbus A320ceo
- Airbus A320neo
- Airbus A320 family
- Airbus A321
- Airbus A330
- Airbus A330ceo
- Airbus A330neo
- Airbus A330-302
  - Airbus A330 MRTT
- Airbus A330-743L
- Airbus A333
- Airbus A340
- Airbus A350
- Airbus A350-900
- Airbus A350 XWB
- Airbus A380
- Airbus A400M
- Airbus Beluga
- Airbus BelugaXL
- Airbus Bird of Prey
- Airbus E-Fan
- Airbus E-Fan X
- Airbus Maveric
- Airbus Skylink

=== Airbus Helicopters ===
- Airbus Helicopters H120
- Airbus Helicopters H125
- Airbus Helicopters H130
- Airbus Helicopters H135
- Airbus Helicopters H145
- Airbus Helicopters H155
- Airbus Helicopters H160
- Airbus Helicopters H175
- Airbus Helicopters H215
- Airbus Helicopters H225
- Airbus Helicopters UH-72A Lakota
- Airbus Helicopters EC160
- Airbus Helicopters AS365
- Airbus Helicopters VSR700 OPV
- Airbus CityAirbus

=== Airco ===
(Aircraft Manufacturing Company)

- Airco DH.1
- Airco DH.2
- Airco DH.3
- Airco DH.4
- Airco DH.5
- Airco DH.6
- Airco DH.9
- Airco DH.9A
- Airco DH.9C
- Airco DH.10 Amiens
- Airco DH.11 Oxford
- Airco DH.14
  - Airco DH.14A
- Airco DH.15
- Airco DH.16
- Airco DH.18

=== Airconcept ===
- Airconcept VoWi 10

=== Aircore ===
(Aircore Industries)

- Aircore Cadet

=== Aircorp ===
(Aircorp Pty. Ltd.) JAWA

- Aircorp B-2N Bushmaster
- Aircorp B-316 Bushmaster
- Aircorp B-460 Bushmaster
- Aircorp B-480 Bushmaster

=== AirCoupe ===
(AirCoupe Div, Air Products Co Ltd)

- AirCoupe F-1A

=== Aircraft Associates ===
(Aircraft Associates Inc, Long Beach, CA)

- Aircraft Associates J-2 Cub

=== Aircraft Builders ===
(Aircraft Builders Co, Coldwater, MI)

- Aircraft Builders Parrot

=== Aircraft Builders Club ===
(Aircraft Builders Club, Lakewood, Cleveland, OH)

- Aircraft Builders Club 1930 Biplane

=== Aircraft Cooperative Mechta ===
- Aircraft Cooperative Mechta AC-4 Russia

=== Aircraft Designs ===
- ADI Bumble Bee
- ADI Condor
- ADI Sportster
- ADI Stallion
- ADI Nova

=== Aircraft Disposal Company ===
see:Airdisco

=== Aircraft Engineering Corp ===
(see Ace)

=== Aircraft Engineers ===
(Aircraft Engineers Inc., Chicago, IL)

- Aircraft Engineers B-2

=== Aircraft Industries of Canada ===
- AIC Super Cheetah

=== Aircraft Manufacturing Company ===
(Aircraft Mfg Co, (possibly Ft Worth), TX)

- Texas Bullet

=== Aircraft Research ===
- Aircraft Research BT-11

=== Aircraft Sales and Parts ===
- Beaver RX 550 Plus
- Chinook Plus 2

=== Aircraft Specialties ===
(Aircraft Specialties Co, Saugus, CA)

- Aircraft Specialties Betsa Bird
- Aircraft Specialties Wing Ding

=== Aircraft Technologies ===
(Aircraft Technologies Inc, Lilburn, GA)

- Aircraft Technologies Acro 1
- Aircraft Technologies Atlantis

=== Airdale ===
(Airdale Flyer Company)

- Airdale Airdale
- Airdale Avid Plus
- Airdale Backcountry

=== Airdisco ===
(Aircraft Disposal Company / ADC)

- Airdisco Phi-Phi
- Martinsyde ADC1
- Airdisco Nimbus-Martinsyde
- ADC Variable Camber Monoplane

=== Airdrome Aeroplanes ===
- Airdrome Bleriot Model XI (0.75:1)
- Airdrome Bleriot Model XI (1:1)
- Airdrome DeHavilland DH-2 (0.75:1)
- Airdrome Dream Classic
- Airdrome Dream Fantasy Twin
- Airdrome Eindecker E-III (0.75:1)
- Airdrome Fokker D-VI (0.75:1)
- Airdrome Fokker D-VII (0.8:1)
- Airdrome Fokker D-VIII (0.75:1)
- Airdrome Fokker DR-1 (1:1)
- Airdrome Fokker DR-1 (0.75:1)
- Airdrome Morane Saulnier L (0.75:1)
- Airdrome Nieuport 11 (0.87:1)
- Airdrome Nieuport 16 (1:1)
- Airdrome Nieuport 17 (1:1)
- Airdrome Nieuport 17 bis (1:1)
- Airdrome Nieuport 24 (1:1)
- Airdrome Nieuport 24 bis (1:1)
- Airdrome Nieuport 25 (1:1)
- Airdrome Nieuport 28 (1:1)
- Airdrome Royal Aircraft Factory SE-5a
- Airdrome Sopwith Baby
- Airdrome Sopwith Camel (1:1)
- Airdrome Sopwith Pup (1:1)
- Airdrome Sopwith Schneider (1:1)
- Airdrome Sopwith Tabloid (1:1)
- Airdrome Taube (0.75:1)

=== Aire-Kraft ===
(Aire-Kraft Co, Washington, PA)

- Aire-Kraft OHS-111 'Cabin-Aire'

=== Airfer ===
(Airfer Paramotores, Paramotores Air-Future, S.L., Pontevedra, Spain)

- Airfer Transan
- Airfer Bimax
- Airfer Titan
- Airfer Tornado

=== Airfisch ===
(Hanno Fischer founded his design office Fischer – Flugmechanik, and together with his later partner Klaus Matjasic)

- Airfisch 1
- Airfisch 2
- Airfisch 3
- Airfisch 8 (Flarecraft)
- Fischer Hoverwing HW20

=== Airflow ===
(Airflow S.P.R.L.)

- Airflow Twinbee

=== Airframes Unlimited ===
(Athens, Texas, United States)

- Airframes Unlimited Hyperlite
- Airframes Unlimited Skeeter
- Airframes Unlimited SS-2 Trainer
- Airframes Unlimited Super 103
- Airframes Unlimited T-2
- Airframes Unlimited T-103

=== Airgo ===
(Airgo Mfg Co (J Henley), Guthrie, OK)

- Airgo A-1
- Airgo B

=== Airkraft ===
(Airkraft Gmbh Leichtflugzeugbau, Beringen, Switzerland)

- Airkraft Sunny

=== Airline ===
(Airline Transportation Co (fdr: L E Hardy), Los Angeles, CA)

- Airline Arrow

=== AirLony ===
- AirLony Skylane
- AirLony Highlander

=== Airmak ===
(Airmak srl.)

- Airmak J4

=== Airmass Inc. ===
- Airmass Sunburst

=== Airmaster ===
(Airmaster Helicopters)

- Airmaster H2-B1

=== Airmaster ===
(Airmaster Inc (pres: Lawrence Matanski), Renton, WA)

- Airmaster Avalon 680
- Airmaster Twin Star 1000
- Airmaster A-1200 Guardian

=== Airmax ===
(Airmax Construcoes Aeronautica)

- Airmax Sea Max

=== Airmotive Engineers ===
(Pontiac Oakland Airport, Pontiac, MI)

- Airmotive EOS 001

=== Airo ===
(Airo Aviation FZ-LLC, Ras Al Khaimah Free Trade Zone, United Arab Emirates)

- Airo 1
- Airo 5

=== Airplane Alley ===
(Airplane Alley - Mike Huffman)

- Bede-Huffman BD-8

=== Airplane Factory, The ===
(The Airplane factory (Pty) Ltd, Tedderfield Airpark, Eikenhof, Johannesburg South, South Africa)

- Airplane Factory Speedstar 850
- Airplane Factory Sling 2
- Airplane Factory Sling 4

=== Airship Development ===
- Airship Development AD1

=== Airship Manufacturing ===
- Sky Sentinel

=== Airspeed ===
(Airspeed Ltd)

- Airspeed AS.1 Tern
- Airspeed AS.4 Ferry
- Airspeed AS.5 Courier
- Airspeed AS.6 Envoy
- Airspeed AS.8 Viceroy
- Airspeed AS.9
- Airspeed AS.10 Oxford
- Airspeed AS.14
- Airspeed AS.15
- Airspeed AS.16 - number reserved for licence built Fokker F.XXII but never ordered
- Airspeed AS.17 - reserved for licence built Fokker D.XVII
- Airspeed AS.19 - Fokker D.XIX
- Airspeed AS.20 - reserved for licence built Fokker F.XXXVI
- Airspeed AS.21 - Fokker D.XX
- Airspeed AS.22 - reserved for licence built Fokker C.X
- Airspeed AS.23 - reserved for licence built Douglas DC-2
- Airspeed AS.24
- Airspeed AS.27
- Airspeed AS.29 - design tendered to Air Ministry Specification B.1/35, not proceeded with
- Airspeed AS.30 Queen Wasp
- Airspeed AS.31 - to AM Specification F.35/35, not built
- Airspeed AS.32
- Airspeed AS.33
- Airspeed AS.34
- Airspeed AS.35
- Airspeed AS.36 - AM Specification T.1/37, not built
- Airspeed AS.37 - AM Specification Q.8/37 radio controlled target, not built
- Airspeed AS.38 Queen Wasp
- Airspeed AS.39 Fleet Shadower
- Airspeed AS.40 Oxford
- Airspeed AS.41 Oxford
- Airspeed AS.42 Oxford - specification T.39/37 for the Royal New Zealand Air Force
- Airspeed AS.43 Oxford
- Airspeed AS.44
- Airspeed AS.46 Oxford V
- Airspeed AS.45 Cambridge
- Airspeed AS.47 - military design not built
- Airspeed AS.48 - Night-fighter design abandoned after all work lost in bombing raid
- Airspeed AS.49 - Proposed development of Airspeed Queen Wasp to Specification T.24/40, not built
- Airspeed AS.50 Queen Wasp
- Airspeed AS.51 Horsa MkI
- Airspeed AS.54 - Specification TX.3/43
- Airspeed AS.55
- Airspeed AS.56 - fighter design tendered to F.6/42 but turned down
- Airspeed AS.57 Ambassador
- Airspeed AS.58 Horsa Mk II
- Airspeed AS.59 Ambassador Mk.II - unbuilt project
- Airspeed AS.60 Ayrshire - military development of Ambassador to specification C.13/45, ordered but not built
- Airspeed AS.64 - tendered to specification C.26/43
- Airspeed AS.65 Consul
- Airspeed AS.66 - proposal for Ambassador development
- Airspeed AS.67 - proposal for Ambassador development
- Airspeed AS.69
- Airspeed LXM1

=== Airsport ===
(Airsport SRO, Zbraslavice, Czech Republic)

- Airsport Sonata
- Airsport Sonet
- Airsport Song

=== Airtec ===
(CASA / Nutanio joint venture)

- Airtec CN-235 (-10 and -100 only)

=== Airtech Canada ===
- Airtech Canada DHC-3/1000 Otter
- Airtech Canada DHC-2/PZL-3S Beaver
- Airtech Canada DC-3/2000
- Airtech Canada/PZL Turbo Orlik
- Airtech Canada Skylark

=== Airtime Products ===
(Airlie Beach, Queensland, Australia)

- Airtime Discovery
- Airtime Explorer

=== Airtrike ===
(Airtrike GmbH, Berlin, Germany)

- Airtrike Eagle 5

=== AirUtility ===
(AirUtility Cargo Co, North Sacramento, CA)

- AirUtility AU-18
- AirUtility AU-18-150B
- AirUtility AU-27

=== Airwave Gliders ===
(Fulpmes, Austria)

- Airwave Magic
- Airwave Scenic
- Airwave Sport
- Airwave Ten
- Airwave Wave

=== Airwings ===
(Airwings Inc, New Brunswick, New Jersey)

- Airwings X

=== Airworthy ===
(Airworthy Airplane Co (George Antolchick & Frederick H Jolly), Chicago, IL)

- Airworthy Terrier

=== AIS ===
(Aviatsionnaya Ispitatelnaya Stantsiya)

- AIS Aist
- AIS torpedo carrier

=== AISA ===
(Aeronáutica Industrial S.A.)

- AISA I-11
- AISA I-11B
- AISA I-115
- AISA IH-51
- AISA H-52
- AISA GN
- AISA HM.1
- AISA HM.5
- AISA HM.9
- AISA AVD.12
- AISA GP-1 (González Gil)
- AISA HM1-B
- AISA Loring X

=== Aist ===
- Aist-123

=== AJI ===
(American Jet Industries Inc (Pres: Allen E Paulson), Van Nuys, CA)

- AJI Hustler 400
- AJI Hustler 500
- AJI T-610 Super Pinto
- AJI Turbo Star 402

=== Akabane ===
(Akabane Hikoki Seisakusho - Akabane Aeroplane Manufacturing Works)

- Akabane Kishi No.1 Tsurigi-go Aeroplane
- Akabane Kishi No.2 Tsurigi-go Aeroplane
- Akabane Kishi No.3 Tsurigi-go Aeroplane
- Akabane Kishi No.4 Tsurigi-go Aeroplane
- Akabane Kishi No.5 Tsurigi-go Aeroplane
- Akabane Kishi No.6 Tsurigi-go Aeroplane

=== Akaflieg Berlin ===
(Flugtechnische Fachgruppe)

- Akaflieg Berlin B1 "Charlotte"
- Akaflieg Berlin B2 "Teufelchen"
- Akaflieg Berlin B3 "Charlotte2"
- Akaflieg Berlin B4 "F.F."
- Akaflieg Berlin B5
- Akaflieg Berlin B6
- Akaflieg Berlin B7 project
- Akaflieg Berlin B8
- Akaflieg Berlin B9 (RLM 8-341)
- Akaflieg Berlin B10
- Akaflieg Berlin B11
- Akaflieg Berlin B12
- Akaflieg Berlin B13

=== Akaflieg Braunschweig ===
- Akaflieg Braunschweig SB-1
- Akaflieg Braunschweig SB-02 Brockenhexe
- Akaflieg Braunschweig SB-3
- Akaflieg Braunschweig SB-4
- Akaflieg Braunschweig SB-5 Danzig
- Akaflieg Braunschweig SB-6
- Akaflieg Braunschweig SB-7 Nimbus
- Akaflieg Braunschweig SB-8
- Akaflieg Braunschweig SB-9 Stratus
- Akaflieg Braunschweig SB-10 Schirokko
- Akaflieg Braunschweig SB-11
- Akaflieg Braunschweig SB-12
- Akaflieg Braunschweig SB-13 Arcus
- Akaflieg Braunschweig SB-14

=== Akaflieg Danzig ===
(Akafdemischen Fliegergruppe der Technischen Hoch-schule Danzig)

- Akaflieg Danzig Boot Danzig

=== Akaflieg Darmstadt ===
- Akaflieg Darmstadt D-1
- Akaflieg Darmstadt D-2 Pumpelmeise
- Akaflieg Darmstadt D-3 Nolleputzchen
- Akaflieg Darmstadt D-4 Edith
- Akaflieg Darmstadt D-5 Flohschwanz
- Akaflieg Darmstadt D-6 Geheimrat
- Akaflieg Darmstadt D-7 Margarete
- Akaflieg Darmstadt D-8 Karl der Große
- Akaflieg Darmstadt D-9 Konsul
- Akaflieg Darmstadt D-10 Hessen / Piepmatz
- Akaflieg Darmstadt D-12 Roemryke Berge
- Akaflieg Darmstadt D-15 Westpreußen
- Akaflieg Darmstadt D-16
- Akaflieg Darmstadt D-17 Darmstadt
- Akaflieg Darmstadt D-18
- Akaflieg Darmstadt D-19 Darmstadt II
- Akaflieg Darmstadt D-20 Starkenburg
- Akaflieg Darmstadt D-22
- Akaflieg Darmstadt D-28 Windspiel
- Akaflieg Darmstadt D-29b
- Akaflieg Darmstadt D-30 Cirrus
- Akaflieg Darmstadt D-31
- Akaflieg Darmstadt D-32
- Akaflieg Darmstadt D-33 (Lippisch / Heinemann DM-1)
- Akaflieg Darmstadt D-34
- Akaflieg Darmstadt D-36 Circe
- Akaflieg Darmstadt D-37 Artemis
- Akaflieg Darmstadt D-38
- Akaflieg Darmstadt D-39 Mc Hinz
- Akaflieg Darmstadt D-40
- Akaflieg Darmstadt D-41
- Akaflieg Darmstadt D-42
- Akaflieg Darmstadt D-43

=== Akaflieg Darmstadt/Akaflieg München ===
- Akaflieg Darmstadt/Akaflieg München DM1
- Akaflieg Darmstadt/Akaflieg München DM2
- Akaflieg Darmstadt/Akaflieg München DM3
- Akaflieg Darmstadt/Akaflieg München DM4

=== Akaflieg Hannover ===
- Akaflieg Hannover AFH-24

=== Akaflieg Karlsruhe ===
- Akaflieg Karlsruhe AK-1
- Akaflieg Karlsruhe AK-5
- Akaflieg Karlsruhe AK-5b
- Akaflieg Karlsruhe AK-8

=== Akaflieg Köln ===
- Akaflieg Köln AFK-1

=== Akaflieg München ===
- Akaflieg München Mü1 Vogel Roch
- Akaflieg München Mü2 Münchner Kindl
- Akaflieg München Mü3 Kakadu
- Akaflieg München Mü4 München
- Akaflieg München Mü5 Wastl
- Akaflieg München Mü6
- Akaflieg München Mü7
- Akaflieg München Mü8
- Akaflieg München Mü9
- Akaflieg München Mü10 Milan
- Akaflieg München Mü11 Papagei
- Akaflieg München Mü12 Kiwi
- Akaflieg München Mü13 Merlin / Atlante
- Akaflieg München Mü14
- Akaflieg München Mü15
- Akaflieg München Mü16
- Akaflieg München Mü17 Merle
- Akaflieg München Mü18 Meßkrähe
- Akaflieg München Mü19
- Akaflieg München Mü20
- Akaflieg München Mü22
- Akaflieg München Mü23 Saurier
- Akaflieg München Mü24
- Akaflieg München Mü25
- Akaflieg München Mü26
- Akaflieg München Mü27
- Akaflieg München Mü28
- Akaflieg München Mü30 Schlacro
- Akaflieg München Mü31

=== Akaflieg Stuttgart ===
- Akaflieg Stuttgart F.1 Fledermaus
- Akaflieg Stuttgart fs16 Wipperstertz
- Akaflieg Stuttgart fs17
- Akaflieg Stuttgart fs18
- Akaflieg Stuttgart fs23 Hidalgo
- Akaflieg Stuttgart fs24 Phönix
- Akaflieg Stuttgart fs25 Cuervo
- Akaflieg Stuttgart fs26 Moseppl
- Akaflieg Stuttgart fs28 Avispa
- Akaflieg Stuttgart fs29 TF
- Akaflieg Stuttgart fs31
- Akaflieg Stuttgart fs32 Aguila
- Akaflieg Stuttgart fs33 Gavilán
- Akaflieg Stuttgart fs34 Albatros
- Akaflieg Stuttgart fs35
- Akaflieg Stuttgart Icaré II

=== Akaflieg Wilhelmshaven ===
- Akaflieg Wilhelmshaven SD-1 Mini-Sport

=== Akasamitra ===
(Akasamitra Homebuilt Aircraft Association)

- Akasamitra ST-220

=== Akerman ===
(John D Akerman, Northland Aviation Co, Minneapolis, MN)

- Akerman JDA-8
- VEF JDA-10M
- Akerman Tailless

=== Akers ===
(Akers Aircraft, Chicago, IL)

- Akers A-1

=== Akin ===
(Earl T Akin, Breckenridge, TX)

- Akin AA
- Akin Buckaroo

=== Akins ===
(Rick Akins)

- Akins Stinger

=== Akro ===
(Leo Loudenschlager)

- Akro Laser 200

=== Akron-Funk ===
(see Funk)

=== Akrotech Aviation ===
(Akrotech Aviation, Inc, Scappoose, OR)

- Giles G-200
- Giles G-202

=== Alaire ===
- Alaire AL.1 Cacique

=== Alamo ===
(Alamo Aircraft Corp, San Antonio, TX)

- Alamo 1929 Biplane

=== Alaparma ===
see also Mantelli

- Alaparma Baldo
- Alaparma Tucano

=== Albar ===
(Lavigne Albar, Mount Pleasant, MI)

- Albar Albarian
- Albar Amphibian

=== Albastar ===
(Albastar Ltd)

- Albastar A1
- Albastar Apis

=== Albatros ===
(Albatros Flugzeugwerke G.m.b.H.) Data from:German Aircraft between 1919 - 1945

- Albatros B.I
- Albatros B.II
- Albatros B.III
- Albatros C.I
- Albatros C.II
- Albatros C.III
- Albatros C.IV
- Albatros C.V
- Albatros C.VI
- Albatros C.VII
- Albatros C.VIII
- Albatros C.IX
- Albatros C.X
- Albatros C.XII
- Albatros C.XIII
- Albatros C.XIV
- Albatros C.XV
- Albatros CLS.I
- Albatros D.I
- Albatros D.II
- Albatros D.III
- Albatros D.IV
- Albatros D.V
- Albatros D.VI
- Albatros D.VII
- Albatros D.VIII
- Albatros D.IX
- Albatros D.X
- Albatros D.XI
- Albatros D.XII
- Albatros Dr.I
- Albatros Dr.II
- Albatros F.2 (Farman III)
- Albatros G.II
- Albatros G.III
- Albatros H 1
- Albatros J.I
- Albatros J.II
- Albatros J.III
- Albatros L 1 B.I DDK
- Albatros L 2 B.II
- Albatros L 3?
- Albatros L 4 G.I
- Albatros L 5 B.III LDD
- Albatros L 6 C.I DM15
- Albatros L 7 (OAW C.I)
- Albatros L 8 C.II
- Albatros L 9 ME
- Albatros L 10 C.III LDDM
- Albatros L 11 G.II
- Albatros L 12 C.IV
- Albatros L 13 (OAW C.II)
- Albatros L 14 C.V
- Albatros L 15 D.I
- Albatros L 16 C.VI
- Albatros L 17 D.II
- Albatros L 18 C.VII
- Albatros L 19 C.VIII
- Albatros L 20 D.III
- Albatros L 21 G.III
- Albatros L 22 D.IV
- Albatros L 23 C.IX
- Albatros L 24 D.V
- Albatros L 25 C.X
- Albatros L 26 C.XI (Project)
- Albatros L 27 C.XII
- Albatros L 28 D.VI
- Albatros L 29 C.XIII
- Albatros L 30 B.IIa
- Albatros L 31 C.XIV
- Albatros L 32 C.Ia
- Albatros L 33 C.Ib
- Albatros L 34 D.VII
- Albatros L 35 D.VIII
- Albatros L 36 Dr.I
- Albatros L 37 D.IX
- Albatros L 38 D.X
- Albatros L 39 Dr.II
- Albatros L 40 J.I
- Albatros L 41 D.XI
- Albatros L 42 J.II
- Albatros L 43 D.XII
- Albatros L 44 D.XIII
- Albatros L 45 D.XIIIa
- Albatros L 46 D.XIV
- Albatros L 47 C.XV
- Albatros L 48 J.III
- Albatros L 49 DA 1
- Albatros L 50 G.IV (Project)
- Albatros L 51 C.If
- Albatros L 52 C.Ifd
- Albatros L 53 CLS.I
- Albatros L 54 F.1
- Albatros L 55 D.XV Project
- Albatros L 56 Project
- Albatros L 57
- Albatros L 58
- Albatros L 59
- Albatros L 60
- Albatros L 61?
- Albatros L 62?
- Albatros L 63?
- Albatros L 64?
- Albatros L 65
- Albatros L 66
  - Albatros L 66a
- Albatros L 67
- Albatros L 68
- Albatros L 69
- Albatros L 70
- Albatros L 71
- Albatros L 72
- Albatros L 73
- Albatros L 74
- Albatros L 75
- Albatros L 76
- Albatros L 77v
- Albatros L 78
- Albatros L 79
- Albatros L 80?
- Albatros L 81
- Albatros L 82
- Albatros L 83
- Albatros L 84
- Albatros L 85?
- Albatros L 86?
- Albatros L 87?
- Albatros L 88?
- Albatros L 89?
- Albatros L 90?
- Albatros L 91?
- Albatros L 92?
- Albatros L 93?
- Albatros L 94?
- Albatros L 95?
- Albatros L 96?
- Albatros L 97?
- Albatros L 98?
- Albatros L 99?
- Albatros L 100 10? a.k.a. Albatros Al 100
- Albatros L 101 a.k.a. Albatros Al 101
- Albatros L 102 a.k.a. Albatros Al 102 / Fw 55
- Albatros L 103 a.k.a. Albatros Al 103
- Albatros AlKA
- Albatros DA 1
- Albatros DDK
- Albatros DE
- Albatros EE (Taube)
- Albatros LDD
- Albatros DM 15 C.I / L.6
- Albatros ME
- Albatros MZ.1
- Albatros MZ.2
- Albatros LDD
- Albatros LDDM
- Albatros VT
- Albatros F.1
- Albatros F.2
- Albatros N.I
- Albatros W.1
- Albatros W.2
- Albatros W.3
- Albatros W.4
- Albatros WD 3
- Albatros WMZ
- Albatros WMZ.2
- Albatros flugboat

=== Albatros OAW ===
(Ostdeutsche Albatroswerke G.m.b.H.)

- Albatros (OAW) C.I (Phönix 20.02)
- Albatros (OAW) C.II
- Albatros G.I (Albatros L4)

=== Albatross ===
(Albatross Scientific-Technical Works - Tsentr Nauchno-Teknhnichesgo Tvorchestva Albatross)

- Albatross AS-2
- Albatross AS-3A
- Albatross Sigma-4 (Elitar Sigma)

=== Albaviation ===
- Albaviation D24 MagicOne

=== Albert ===
(Edouard Albert)Data from:

- Albert TE.1
- Albert TE.2
- Albert A-10
- Albert A-11S
- Albert A-20
- Albert A-60
- Albert A-61
- Albert A-62
- Albert A-120R
- Albert 140

=== Albert ===
(Jean Albert)

- Albert 1910 Monoplane

=== Albessard ===
(Joseph Albessard)

- Albessard Aérobus
- Albessard Triavion

=== Albrecht ===
(Bemer E & James E Albrecht, Anderson, IN)

- Albrecht Monoplane

=== Albree ===
(George N. Albree)

- Albree Pigeon-Fraser Scout

=== ALCA ===
- ALCA-2

=== Alcock ===
- Alcock A.1 Scout

==== Alcor ====
(Alcor (Allan Lockheed Corp) Aircraft Corp)

- Alcor C-6-1 Junior
- Alcor Olympic Duo-4
- Alcor Olympic Duo-6

=== Alder & Derryberry ===
(W C Alder & L E Derryberry, Abilene, TX)

- Alder & Derryberry A

=== Alderson ===
(F T Alderson, El Centro, CA)

- Alderson A-1

=== Alekseyev ===
(Semyon Alexeyev - Alekseyev Design Bureau - OKB-21)

- Alekseyev I-21
- Alekseyev I-210
- Alekseyev I-211
- Alekseyev I-211S
- Alekseyev I-212
- Alekseyev I-213
- Alekseyev I-214
- Alekseyev I-215
- Alekseyev I-216
- Alekseyev I-217
- Alekseyev I-218 (unverified: - 218 or I-218?)
- Alekseyev I-219
- Alekseyev I-220
- Alekseyev I-221

=== Alenia ===
See also: Fiat, Aeritalia, AMX International

- Alenia C-27 Spartan

=== Alexander ===
(Alexander Aircraft Co)

- Alexander B-1
- Alexander Bullet
- Alexander Eaglerock
- Alexander Eaglerock A
- Alexander Eaglerock Combo-Wing
- Alexander Eaglerock Short-Wing
- Alexander Eaglerock Long-Wing
- Alexander Flyabout D
- Alexander Longren
- Alexander Hallett
- Alexander Racer
- Alexander Sedan
- Alexander Cabin Cruiser
- Alexander Swallow

=== Alexandria ===
(Alexandria Aircraft Co)

- Alexandria 10
- Alexandria F-19
- Briggs F-19

=== Alfaro ===
(Heraclio Alfaro (Vitoriano Heraclio Alfaro-Fournier))

- Alfaro I 1913
- Alfaro 1914 (Spain)
- Alfaro Autogyro
- Alfaro X-13
- Ingalls Safety Airplane
- Alfaro 8 (Hereter T.H.)

=== Algate ===
(Algate Aircraft Corp)

- Algate 1

=== Ali Viberti ===
(Ali Viberti S.p.a. / Franco Muscariello)

- Ali Viberti Musca I

=== Alisport ===
(Alisport srl, Cremella, Italy)

- Alisport Yuma
- Alisport Silent 2 Electro
- Alisport Silent Club
- Alisport Silent 2
- Alisport Silent 2 Targa

=== Alkan ===
(Oscar Alkan)

- Alkan le Enfin

=== Alker ===
- Alker Sport

=== All American ===
(All-American Aircraft Inc)

- All American 10-A Ensign

=== Allard ===
- Allard D.40

=== Allen ===
(Edmund T Allen, Salt Lake City, UT)

- Allen 1928 Biplane
- Allen A-4

=== Allen ===
(A J Allen, Savannah, GA)

- Allen A-2
- Allen A-3

=== Allen ===
(Frank Allen, 6040 Dorchester Ave, Chicago, IL)

- Allen DLX Special
- Newhall Racer

=== Allenbaugh ===
(Edward Allenbaugh, North Hollywood, CA)

- Allenbaugh Grey Ghost
- Allenbaugh A
- Allenbaugh B
- Allenbaugh Special

=== Alliance ===
(Alliance Aircraft Company Ltd.)

- Alliance P.1
- Alliance P.2 Seabird

=== Alliance ===
(Alliance Aircraft Corp, North Webb St, Alliance, OH)

- Alliance A-1 Argo

=== Alliance ===
- Alliance X

=== Alliant ===
- Alliant RQ-6 Outrider

=== Allied ===
(Allied Aircraft Corp, North Tonawanda, NY)

- Allied Sport Trainer

=== Allied ===
(Allied Aircraft Corp (pres: J A Phillips), Wichita, KS)

- Allied A-2

=== Allied ===
- Allied Aviation LRA
- Allied Aviation LR2A
- Allied Aviation Trimmer

=== Alliet-Larivière ===
- Alliet-Larivière Allar 4
- Alliet-Larivière AL-06 Frégate

=== Allinio ===
(Peter Allinio, 409 Kearney St, El Cerrito, CA)

- Allinio 1916 Biplane
- Allinio Bristol Cabin

=== Allison ===
((Lawrence M) Allison Airplane Co)

- Allison Alco
- Allison Alco Sport
- Allison Junior Coupe
- Allison Coupster
- Allison MT-3 Utility
- Allison Sport
- Allison Utility
- Allison Junior
- Allison Sportford
- Allison Trainer

=== Allison ===
(Allison Gas Turbine Division GMC)

- Allison Turbine Bonanza
- Allison Turbine Mentor
- Allison Turbine ATF 580S Turbo Flagship

=== Allison-White ===
((Lawrence M) Allison-(Karl H) White)

- Allison-White 1916 Biplane

=== Alon ===
(Alon Inc (founders: John Allen Jr & Lee O Higdon), McPherson, KS)

- Alon A-2 Aircoupe
- Alon A-4

=== Alpaero ===
(ALPAERO Noin Aéronautique, Châteauvieux, France)

- Alpaero Choucas
- Alpaero Exel
- Alpaero Sirius

=== Alpavia ===
(Societe Alpavia)

- Alpavia RF-3

=== Alpha ===
(Alpha Aviation Co)

- Alpha 11D

=== Alpha Aviation ===
(Alpha Aviation (New Zealand))

- Alpha 120T
- Alpha 160A
- Alpha 160Ai

=== Alpi Aviation ===
(Alpi Aviation srl, Pordenone, Italy)

- Alpi Pioneer 200
- Alpi Pioneer 230
- Alpi Pioneer 300
- Alpi Pioneer 300 Kite
- Alpi Pioneer 330
- Alpi Pioneer 400
- Syton AH 130

=== Alpla ===
(Alpla-Werke Alwin Lehner GmbH & Co KG)

- Alpla Samburo

=== Altair Coelho ===
(Eldorado do Sul, Brazil)

- Altair Coelho AC-1
- Altair Coelho AC-11

=== Alter ===
(Ludwig Alter Werke)

- Alter Type AI

=== Altitude Group ===
(Altitude Group, LLC, Overland Park, KS)

- Altitude Radial Rocket

=== Alvarez ===
(Joseph Alvarez, Chino, CA)

- Alvarez Polliwagen

=== Alvarez et de Condé ===
- Alvarez et de Condé No.1
- Alvarez et de Condé No.2
- Alvarez et de Condé No.3

=== AM ===
(Arts et Métiers ParisTech)

- AM-69 Georges Payre

=== AMA ===
(Aircraft Mechanics Association)

- AMA Minx Capon

=== AMA ===
(Anczutin-Malinowski-Aleksandrowicz Andrzej Anczutin, Henryk Malinowski and Rościslaw Aleksandrowicz)

- AMA motor glider

=== Amax Engineering ===
(Donvale, Victoria, Australia)

- Amax Double Eagle TT
- Amax Eagle
- Amax Eagle TT
- Amax J-6 Karatoo
- Amax Sport 1700
- Amax Vixen 105

=== Ambi-Budd ===
- Ambi-Budd Flying Car - 1930s concept car

=== Ambrosini ===
(Societa Aeronautica Italiana Ing. A. Ambrosini & C.)

- Ambrosini F.4 Rondone
- Ambrosini F.7 Rondone II
- Ambrosini P.512
- Ambrosini S.7
- Ambrosini S.1001 Grifo
- Ambrosini S.1002
- Ambrosini SAI.1
- Ambrosini SAI.2
- Ambrosini SAI.2S
- Ambrosini SAI.3
- Ambrosini SAI.7
- Ambrosini SAI.10
- Ambrosini SAI.11
- Ambrosini SAI.107
- Ambrosini SAI.207
- Ambrosini SAI.403 Dardo
- Ambrosini Sagittario
- Ambrosini SS.4
- Ambrosini Super S.7
- Ambrosini AR "flying bomb".

=== AMC ===
- AMC 1919 Multiplane

=== AMD ===
(Aircraft Manufacturing and Development, Eastman, GA)

- AMD Zodiac CH 640
- AMD Alarus CH2000
- SAMA CH2000 (military CH2000)

=== AME ===
(Aeronautica Militar Espanola)

- AME VI
- AME VIA

=== AmEagle ===
- AmEagle American Eaglet

=== American ===
(American Aeroplane Supply House, 266-68 Franklin St, Hempstead, NY)

- American Bleriot XI
- American X-15

=== American Air Jet ===
- American Air Jet American

=== American Air Racing ===
(American Air Racing Ltd.)

- American Air Racing Special

=== American Air Racing ===
(American Air Racing Inc (pres: John Parker), Rancho Palos Verdes, CA)

- Parker JP001
- Parker JP-350

=== American Aircraft ===
- American Aircraft S-1B

=== American Aerolights ===
- American Aerolights Double Eagle
- American Aerolights Eagle
- American Aerolights Falcon

=== American Airmotive ===
(American Airmotive Corp (pres: John D MacArthur), Miami, FL)

- American Airmotive NA-75

=== American Autogyro ===
- American Autogyro Sparrowhawk

=== American Aviation ===
(American Aviation Corp, (Delaware incorporation), New York, NY)

- American Aviation AA-1 Yankee
- American Aviation AA-1A Trainer
- American Aviation AA-2 Patriot
- American Aviation AA-5 Traveler

=== American Champion ===
((American Champion Aircraft Corp (pres: Jerry Mehlhaff), Rochester, WI))

- American Champion 7EC Champ
- American Champion 7ECA Citabria Aurora
- American Champion 7GCAA Citabria Adventure
- American Champion 7GCBC Citabria Explorer
- American Champion 8GCBC Scout
- American Champion Scout CS
- American Champion 8KCAB Super Decathlon

=== American Eagle ===
(American Eagle Aircraft Corp, (Victor H) Roos Lincoln Aircraft Co)

- American Eagle A-1
- American Eagle A-101
- American Eagle A-129
- American Eagle A-139
- American Eagle A-229
- American Eagle A-251 Phaeton
- American Eagle A-329
- American Eagle A-429
- American Eagle A-430
- American Eagle A-529
- American Eagle A-629
- American Eagle D-430
- American Eagle E-430
- American Eagle 201
- American Eagle 330
- American Eagle Eaglet 31
- American Eagle Eaglet 130
- American Eagle Eaglet 230
- American Eagle Eaglet 231
- American Eagle Eaglet A-31
- American Eagle Eaglet B-31
- American Eagle Eaglet B-32
- American Eagle Flyabout

=== American Eaglecraft ===
(American Eaglecraft Co, Fort Worth & Grapevine, TX)

- Eaglet A-31-B
- Eaglet B-31

=== American Electric ===
- American Electric Piranha

=== American Flea ===
(American Mignet Aircraft Corp.)

- American Flea HM-20
- American Flea HM-21
- American Flea HM-23
- American Flea TC-1

=== American General Aviation Corporation ===
- American General AG-5B Tiger

=== American Gyro ===
(American Gyro Co, Denver, CO)

- American Gyro AG-4 Crusader
- American Gyro AG-6 Buccaneer
- American Gyro AG-7

=== American Helicopter ===
(American Helicopter Co., a division of Fairchild Aircraft)

- American Helicopter A-5 Top Sergeant
- American Helicopter A-6 Buck Private
- American Helicopter XH-26 Jet Jeep
- American Helicopter A-8
- American Helicopter Transporter (with Fairchild)

=== American Homebuilts ===
(Hebron, Illinois)

- American Homebuilts John Doe

=== American Jet Industries ===
- American Jet Industries T-610 Super Cobra

=== American Legend ===
(American Legend Aircraft Co)

- American Legend AL3C-100 Cub
- American Legend AL11C-100
- American Legend AL11J-120
- American Legend Super Legend
- American Legend Texas Sport Cub
- American Legend MOAC

=== American Moth ===
(Vulcan Aircraft Co,)

- Vulcan V-1
- Vulcan V-3

=== American Patriot Aircraft ===
(American Patriot Aircraft LLC, Westfield, WI)

- American Patriot Supercruiser

=== American Sportscopter ===
(Newport News, VA)

- American Sportscopter Ultrasport 254
- American Sportscopter Ultrasport 331
- American Sportscopter Ultrasport 496

=== American Sunbeam ===
(American Sunbeam Aircraft Ltd)

- American Sunbeam LP-1 Pup

=== American Utilicraft Corp. ===
- Utilicraft FF-1080

=== AmeriPlanes ===
- AmeriPlanes Mitchell Wing A-10

=== Ames ===
(Butler Ames, Washington, DC)

- Ames 1908 Drum wing experimental

=== Ames ===
(William P Ames)

- Ames Parasol

=== Ames-Dryden ===
(Ames Industrial Co)

- Ames-Dryden AD-1 Oblique Wing

=== Ameur ===
(Ameur Aviation Technologie / AAT)

- AAT Balbzard
- Ameur Altania
- Ameur Altania RG 80 UL
- Ameur Altania Vista
- Ameur Inguidar
- Ameur Altania Saphir
- Ameur UAV MALE
- Ameur Altajet

=== AMF Microflight ===
(AMF Aviation Enterprises, Aviation Enterprises)

- AMF Chevvron 2-32C
- AMF Super Chevvron 2-45CS
- AMF Sea Chevvron 2-48
- AMF Aviation Enterprises Magnum

=== Amicale d'Aviation Légère ===
- Amicale d'Aviation Légère 04

=== Amiot ===
(SECM-Amiot - Société d'Emboutissage et de Constructions Mécaniques / Félix Amiot)

- SECM 10 BN.2
- SECM 12 BN.2
- SECM 20
- SECM 22
- SECM 23
- SECM 24
- Amiot 01
- Amiot 110
- Amiot 120
- Amiot 122
- Amiot 123
- Amiot 124
- Amiot 125
- Amiot 130
- Amiot 140
- Amiot 141M
- Amiot 142
- Amiot 143M
- Amiot 144
- Amiot 150
- Amiot 340
- Amiot 341
- Amiot 350
- Amiot 351
- Amiot 352
- Amiot 353
- Amiot 354
- Amiot 355
- Amiot 356
- Amiot 357
- Amiot 358
- Amiot 370
- Amiot AAC.1 Tucan

=== Ampaire ===
- Ampaire Electric EEL

=== Amphibians ===
- Amphibians Privateer

=== AMS-Flight ===
(AMS-Flight, Ljubljana)

- AMS Carat

=== Amsco ===
- Amsco parasol monoplane

=== AMV ===
(AMV Aircraft (fdr: Attila Melkuti), Aliso Viejo, CA)

- AMV 211

=== AMX ===
- AMX International AMX
