= Akaflieg Stuttgart fs16 =

German single-seat glider, 1937

General information
- Type: Glider aircraft
- National origin: Nazi Germany
- Manufacturer: Akaflieg Stuttgart
- Number built: 1

History
- First flight: February 1937

The Akaflieg Stuttgart fs16, nicknamed Wippsterz (German: Wagtail) was a glider aircraft that was designed and built in Germany from 1936. Only one example of the design was constructed.

== Development ==
Akaflieg Stuttgart wanted to build a glider with reasonable performance that was safe and simple to fly, the result was the fs16. The design employed a cantilever wing attached to the top of the fuselage; the rear portion of the fuselage was raised, similar to the Akaflieg Stuttgart F.1. The fs16 as constructed had no vertical tail, but used pivoting panels on the wingtips for roll and yaw control. It had no tail-skid, using a single large skid under the front fuselage with a spur extending rearwards for support and stability on the ground. Flight characteristics with the rotating wing-tip panels were not as expected so a conventional vertical fin on an extended rear fuselage, and ailerons constructed from fabric-covered Duralumin on the outer wing trailing edges, were added after initial flights.

== Specifications ==
Data from Flugzeug-Typenbuch. Handbuch der deutschen Luftfahrt- und Zubehör-Industrie 1944

General characteristics

- Crew: 1
- Length: 6.13 m (20 ft 1 in)
- Wingspan: 15.78 m (51 ft 9 in)
- Height: 2.14 m (7 ft 0 in)
- Wing area: 13.3 m^{2} (143 sq ft)
- Length de-rigged: 5.3 m (17 ft)
- Width de-rigged (without tailplane): 0.6 m (2 ft 0 in)
- Width de-rigged (with tailplane): 2.83 m (9 ft 3 in)
- Height de-rigged: 1.12 m (3 ft 8 in)
- Aspect ratio: 18.5
- Airfoil: root: NACA 2318; mid-span NACA 2312 tip: NACA 0012
- Empty weight: 144 kg (317 lb)
- Gross weight: 230 kg (507 lb)

Performance

- Never exceed speed: 120 km/h (75 mph, 65 kn)
- g limits: +8 (ultimate)
- Maximum glide ratio: 24 at 65 km/h (40 mph; 35 kn)
- Rate of sink: 0.8 m/s (160 ft/min) at 55 km/h (34 mph; 30 kn)
- Wing loading: 17.5 kg/m^{2} (3.6 lb/sq ft)

== Similar aircraft ==
- Schleicher Rhönadler
