= Akaflieg München Mü9 =

Mü9

General information
- Type: Tail-less Aircraft
- National origin: Germany
- Manufacturer: Akaflieg München
- Number built: 1

The Akaflieg München Mü9 is a tail-less light aircraft that was designed in Germany in 1932.

== Development ==
Construction of the tail-less Mü9 was almost complete when further work was abandoned due to the negative experiences of contemporary tail-less aircraft builders and the far from satisfactory Akaflieg München Mü5 Wastl. The sharply tapered wing was to have had moderate sweep on the leading edge and zero sweep on the trailing edge with small vertical surfaces at the wing-tips. The fuselage pod was to support the engine in the nose, house the cabin amidships and the tailwheel at the extreme rear, with no fin or rudder, (at least as initially designed), as well as the mountings for the main undercarriage legs which were to have been angled outwards to provide adequate track.

== Specifications (Mü9) ==
Data from Mü9

General characteristics

- Crew: 1
- Length: 4.26 m (14 ft 0 in)
- Wingspan: 10 m (32 ft 10 in)
- Wing area: 15 m^{2} (161.5 sq ft)
- Empty weight: 360 kg (794 lb)
- Gross weight: 700 kg (1,543 lb)

Performance
