= Akaflieg München Mü3 Kakadu =

German single-seat glider, 1928

Mü3 Kakadu
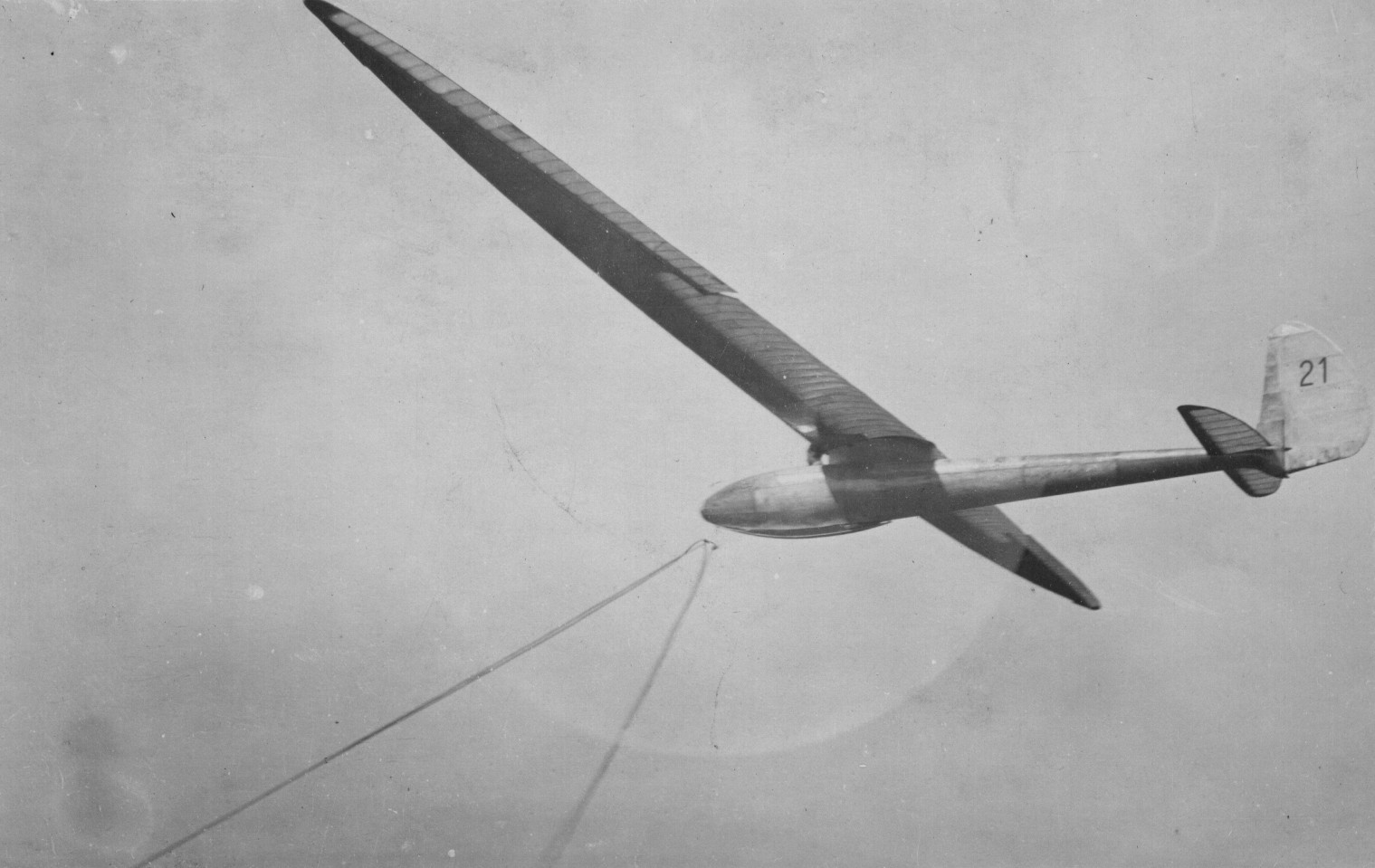
- The Mü3 taking a bungee launch

General information
- Type: Competition Glider
- National origin: Germany
- Manufacturer: Akaflieg München
- Designer: Dr. August Kupper
- Number built: 1

History
- First flight: 1928

The Akaflieg München Mü3 Kakadu is a glider designed and built in Germany in 1928.

== Development ==
The Mü3 "Kakadu" was the first high performance glider designed and built at Akaflieg München. The Mü3 "Kakadu" was completed in time for the 1928 Rhön Competition at the Wasserkuppe, emerging as an impressive aircraft with a tapered wing, circular section fuselage and smooth lines. Designed by Dr. August Kupper, (nicknamed “Kakadu”), the Mü3 was regarded as the forerunner of the high aspect ratio, low induced drag sailplanes that emerged in the 1930s, such as 'Fafnir' and 'Austria'. Throughout the thirties the Mü3 Kakadu remained the highest performance glider at Akaflieg München being used for competition flying as well as mountain flying research.

== Specifications (Mü3 Kakadu') ==
Data from

General characteristics

- Crew: 1
- Length: 7.6 m (24 ft 11 in)
- Wingspan: 19.56 m (64 ft 2 in)
- Wing area: 17.2 m^{2} (185 sq ft)
- Aspect ratio: 22.2
- Airfoil: Göttingen 652
- Empty weight: 200 kg (441 lb)
- Gross weight: 280 kg (617 lb)

Performance

== See also ==
Related lists

- List of gliders
