= Albatros D.VII =

German prototype fighter biplane

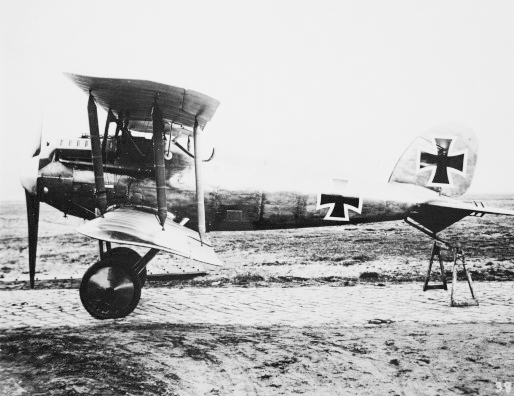

General information
- Type: Fighter
- Manufacturer: Albatros Flugzeugwerke
- Primary user: Germany

The Albatros D.VII was a German prototype single-seat fighter biplane flown in August 1917. It was powered by a water-cooled Benz Bz.IIIb V8 engine developing 145 kW (195 hp) and armed with two 7.92 mm (.312 in) machine guns. The D.VII had ailerons on both upper and lower wings linked by hinged struts.

The D.VII's performance was deemed an insufficient advance over existing aircraft to justify further development.
