= Akaflieg Stuttgart fs17 =

German single-seat glider, 1938

General information
- Type: Glider aircraft
- National origin: Nazi Germany
- Manufacturer: Akaflieg Stuttgart
- Number built: 1

History
- First flight: 21 March 1938

The Akaflieg Stuttgart fs17 was a glider aircraft that was designed and built in Germany from 1936. It notably featured a prone seating position for its pilot.

== Development ==
Realising that aircraft form drag is directly related to cross-sectional area of bodies moving through the air, the students of Akaflieg Stuttgart (Akademische Fliegergruppe – academic flying group) investigated methods of reducing the cross-sectional area of fuselage bodies, including the prone-position pilot, where the pilot lies horizontally with his body roughly parallel to the longitudinal axis of the fuselage. They noted an additional benefit of such a configuration is the pilot's increased resistance to the effects of 'g'. With very little previous research to take advantage of Akaflieg Stuttgart designed the FS 17 glider for flight trials of prone position cockpits. The fs17 was an all-wood low-wing cantilever monoplane with emphasis on good low-speed flight characteristics, to reduce the risk to the pilot in stalling accidents, and a maximum load factor of 14g. The fuselage was designed with increased stiffness, to provide increased crash protection for the pilot, and the wing leading edges formed torsion boxes. The pilot lay above the wing centre section under an extensively glazed canopy.

== Specifications ==
Data from Flugzeug-Typenbuch. Handbuch der deutschen Luftfahrt- und Zubehör-Industrie 1944

General characteristics

- Crew: 1
- Length: 5.1 m (16 ft 9 in)
- Wingspan: 10 m (32 ft 10 in)
- Height: 1.82 m (6 ft 0 in)
- Wing area: 12 m^{2} (130 sq ft)
- Aspect ratio: 6.33
- Airfoil: root: NACA 23012; tip: NACA 0009
- Empty weight: 84 kg (185 lb)
- Gross weight: 170 kg (375 lb)

Performance

- Never exceed speed: 450 km/h (280 mph, 240 kn)
- g limits: +14 (ultimate)
- Maximum glide ratio: 19.8 at 81 km/h (50 mph; 44 kn)
- Rate of sink: 0.88 m/s (173 ft/min) at 64 km/h (40 mph; 35 kn)
- Wing loading: 14.17 kg/m^{2} (2.90 lb/sq ft)
