= Air Sylphe =

French aircraft manufacturer

- Company type: Privately held company
- Industry: Aerospace
- Defunct: circa late 2007
- Headquarters: France
- Products: Powered parachutes

Air Sylphe was a French aircraft manufacturer based in Villereau, Nord. The company specialized in the design and manufacture of powered parachutes in the form of ready-to-fly aircraft for the US FAR 103 Ultralight Vehicles and the European Fédération Aéronautique Internationale microlight categories.

The company seems to have gone out of business in the end of 2007.

The company built a line of single and two-seat powered parachutes, all using industrial ducted fans for propellers. Their designs included the single seat Air Sylphe 447 and the two-seat Air Sylphe Bi 582, which was noted as being produced in a special version for wheelchair aviators.

== Aircraft ==
Summary of aircraft built by Air Sylphe
Model name	First flight	Number built	Type
Air Sylphe 447	2000s		single-seat powered parachute
Air Sylphe Bi 582	2004		two-seat powered parachute
