= Akaflieg München Mü17 Merle =

German single-seat glider, 1938

Mü17 Merle
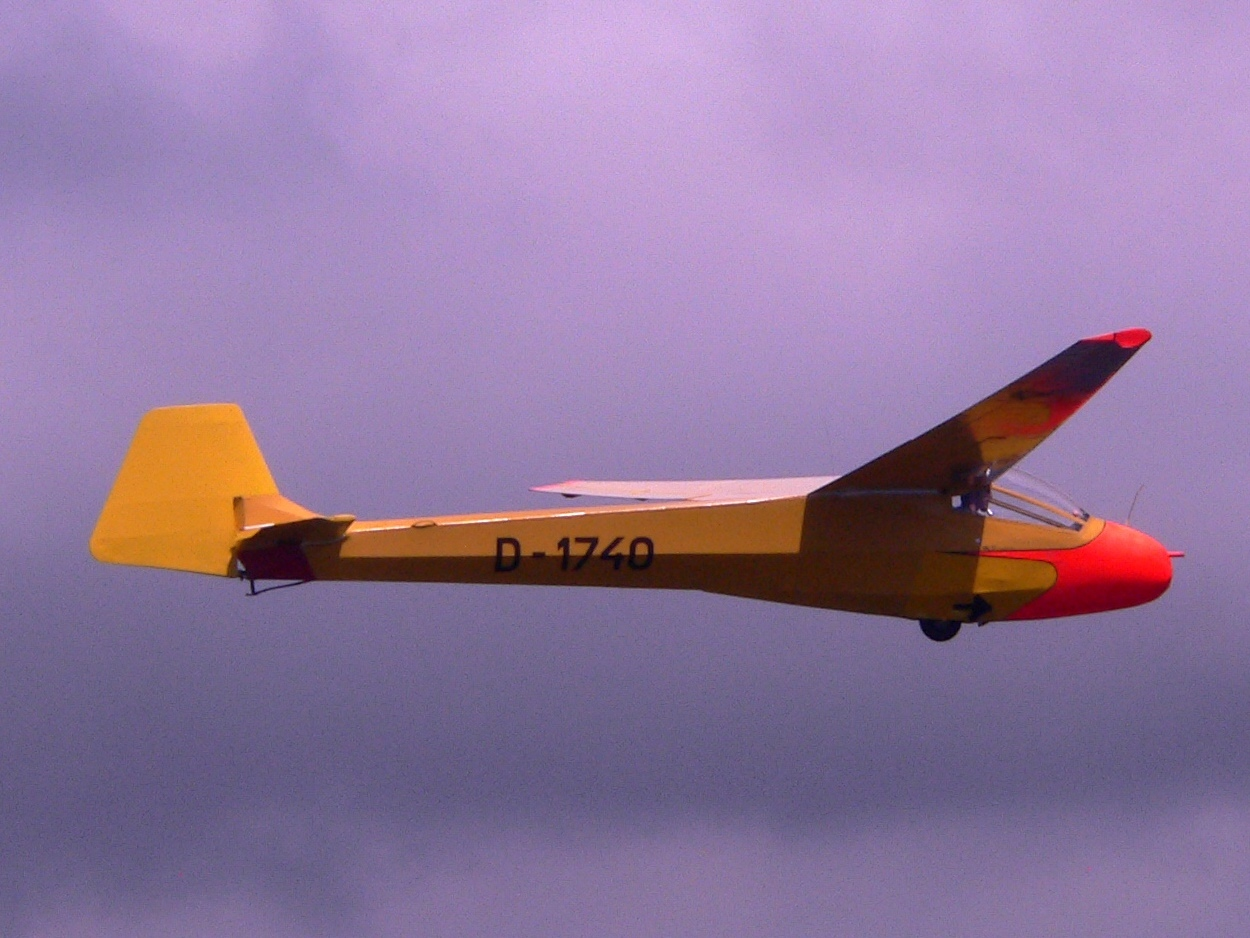
- The Mü17 in flight

General information
- Type: Olympic Glider aircraft
- National origin: Germany
- Manufacturer: Akaflieg München
- Number built: 2 prototypes + ca 60 production units

History
- First flight: 1938

The Akaflieg München Mü17 Merle is a single-place glider aircraft that was designed and built in Germany from 1938.

== Development ==
The Mü17 Merle (a.k.a. 'Aerostat' or 'Kleiderbügel') is the oldest Akaflieg design still flying with the Fliegergruppe today. In 1938 the ISTUS conference issued a specification for an Olympic games Olympic glider to be used at the 1940 Olympics gliding competition. Akaflieg München designed and offered the Mü17 Merle to the committee at Rome in February 1939, but it was rejected in favour of the DFS Meise.

Two prototypes of the Mü17 Merle were built with emphasis on simple construction, straightforward handling and easy rigging and de-rigging, using automatic connections for the aileron and airbrake controls. The plywood- and fabric-covered wooden wings are trapezoidal in plan view with swept leading edges and straight trailing edges, ailerons over the outer half of the trailing edges and spoilers mid-chord at approx half span. Adhering to the 'Schüle München' the fuselage is a welded steel-tube space-frame with fabric covering and wooden tail surfaces, also covered in plywood and fabric. Despite failing in the Olympic selection the Mü17 Merle was put into production with around 60 units built before and after World War II, many with variations such as retractable landing gear.

A Mü17 Merle 'Alpha Sierra' (D-1740), built in 1961, is still in use today at the Akaflieg München gliding club, where it is used as an intermediate single-seater for early single-seat and cross-country flying. The low weight and sedate performance suiting the aircraft to inexperienced pilots.

A 19m (62.3 feet) span wing was conceived for use with the Mü17 fuselage, as the Akaflieg München Mü19, gradually losing all direct connection with the Mü17 as the design evolved into a motor-glider. Construction of the prototype was not completed due to the war situation.

== Variants ==
Akaflieg München Mü17 – The original proposal, a single-seat 15m (49.2 feet) span Olympic glider contender. Two examples were built.
Akaflieg München Mü19 – A 19m span version of the Mü17, not completed due to the war situation.

== Specifications (Mü17 Merle) ==
Data from Flugzeug-Typenbuch. Handbuch der deutschen Luftfahrt- und Zubehör-Industrie 1944.

General characteristics

- Crew: 1
- Length: 7.5 m (24 ft 7 in)
- Wingspan: 15 m (49 ft 3 in)
- Height: 1.06 m (3 ft 6 in)
- Wing area: 13.3 m^{2} (143 sq ft)
- Length de-rigged: 7.5 m (25 ft)
- Width de-rigged (without tailplane): 1.1 m (3 ft 7 in)
- Width de-rigged (with tailplane): 3 m (10 ft)
- Height de-rigged: 1.4 m (4 ft 7 in)
- Aspect ratio: 16.9
- Airfoil: Scheibe Mü
- Empty weight: 160 kg (353 lb)
- Gross weight: 255 kg (562 lb)

Performance

- Never exceed speed: 200 km/h (120 mph, 110 kn)
- g limits: +10 (ultimate)
- Maximum glide ratio: 26:1 at 75 km/h (47 mph; 40 kn)
- Rate of sink: 0.64 m/s (126 ft/min) at 58 km/h (36 mph; 31 kn)
- Wing loading: 19.15 kg/m^{2} (3.92 lb/sq ft)
