= Air-Sport =

Polish aircraft manufacturer

Air-Sport Producent Paralotni
- Company type: Privately held company
- Industry: Aerospace
- Founded: 1989
- Founder: Krzysztof Dudziński
- Headquarters: Zakopane, Poland
- Products: Paragliders
- Website: www.air-sport.pl

Air-Sport Producent Paralotni (English: Air-Sport Paragliding Products) is a Polish aircraft manufacturer based in Zakopane and founded by Krzysztof Dudziński in 1989. The company specializes in the design and manufacture of paragliders and wings for powered paragliding.

Dudziński was the Polish National Paragliding Champion in 1993 and 1998 and a member of the Polish National Team.

The company has produced an ever-evolving line of paragliders, including the intermediate Ajos, the recreational Pasat and the cross-country Chinooka. The Buran was designed specifically for powered paragliding.

The company's gliders were noted by reviewer Noel Bertrand in 2003 as being inexpensively priced, compared to other paragliders on the market at that time.

== Aircraft ==
Aircraft built by Air-Sport:

- Air-Sport Aeolus
- Air-Sport Ajos
- Air-Sport Altus
- Air-Sport Buran
- Air-Sport Chinook
- Air-Sport Daedalus
- Air-Sport Euros
- Air-Sport Fen
- Air-Sport Lahotse
- Air-Sport Notos
- Air-Sport Notosie
- Air-Sport Pasat
