= Akaflieg Braunschweig SB-14 =

German single-seat glider, 2003

SB 14
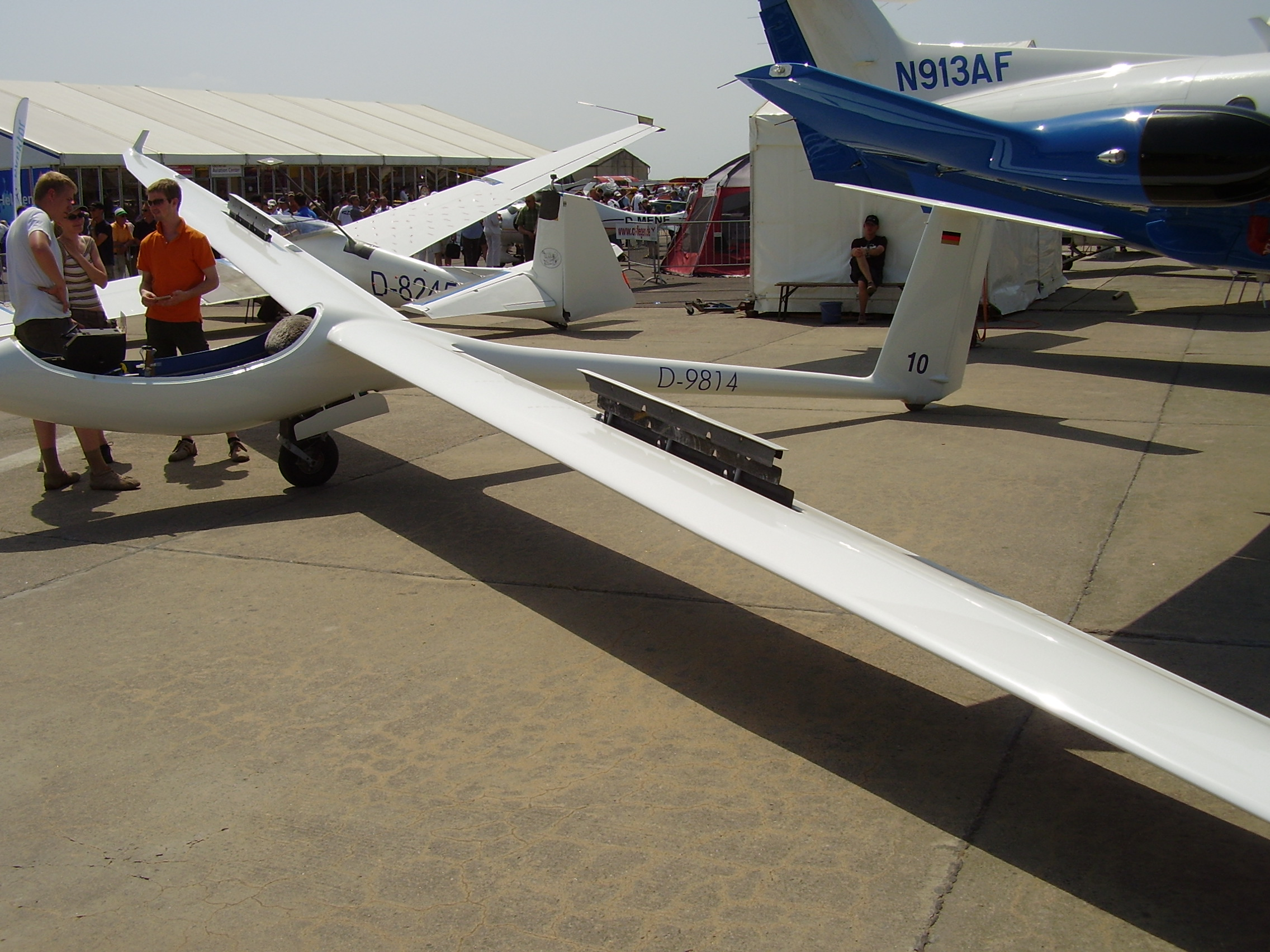
- The SB-14 at ILA Berlin 2008

General information
- Type: single seat sailplane
- National origin: Germany
- Manufacturer: Akaflieg Braunschweig
- Number built: 1

History
- First flight: 17 January 2003

The Akaflieg Braunschweig SB 14 is an 18 m (59 ft) Open-class sailplane designed and built in Germany in the early 2000s.

== Design and development ==
The SB 14 was designed to minimalist principles, reducing wetted area and use of high speed aerofil sections in a high aspect-ratio wing. As an economy measure, the tail unit of the Schleicher ASH 26 was utilised. To improve performance of the wing in a wide range of conditions, the wing-tips have swept wing-lets, as well as turbulators forward of the flaps on the undersurface of the wings.

The SB 14 is a shoulder-wing sailplane constructed from carbon-fibre composite materials. The wings are of very high aspect-ratio and incorporate full span flaperons with slots for when the flaps are extended. The fuselage follows contemporary design practice with a cockpit pod and slender rear fuselage terminating in a T-tail. The cross section of the fuselage has been minimised throughout, reducing wetted area and therefore minimising drag.

Control is through conventional elevator and rudder with full span slotted flaperons on the wings and Schempp-Hirth airbrakes on the upper surfaces at about 1/3 span. The undercarriage is a conventional retractable mono-wheel main undercarriage with a steel tipped rubber block tail-skid under the fin.

Flight testing, from 17 January 2003, revealed very promising performance, optimised with various aero-dynamic refinements.

== Specifications (SB-14 prelim flight testing performance figures) ==
Data from

General characteristics

- Crew: 1
- Capacity: payload (pilot + equipmqnt) 96 kg (212 lb); Water ballast 160 kg (350 lb)
- Length: 6.95 m (22 ft 10 in)
- Wingspan: 18.00 m (59 ft 1 in)
- Height: 1.23 m (4 ft 0 in)
- Wing area: 10.84 m^{2} (116.7 sq ft)
- Aspect ratio: 29.89
- Airfoil: root: CA2-134 / 15V2; tip: CAJ1-134 / 18
- Empty weight: 285 kg (628 lb)
- Max takeoff weight: 541 kg (1,193 lb)

Performance

- Never exceed speed: 272 km/h (169 mph, 147 kn)
- Minimum speed: 70 km/h (43 mph; 38 kn)
- Maximum glide ratio: 50:1 (approx)
- Rate of sink: 0.5 m/s (98 ft/min)
- Wing loading: 33.9 kg/m^{2} (6.9 lb/sq ft) to 50 kg/m^{2} (10 lb/sq ft)
