= Akaflieg München Mü4 München =

German single-seat glider, 1927

General information
- Type: glider
- National origin: Germany
- Manufacturer: Akaflieg München
- Number built: 1

History
- First flight: 1927

The Akaflieg München Mü4 München is a glider that was designed and built in Germany in 1927.

== Development ==
As the membership of Akaflieg München expanded a requirement for more glider training capacity emerged. To provide the extra capacity, students at the Akaflieg designed and built the Mü4 München, ensuring that the aircraft had trouble-free handling and was easy to maintain and repair. Despite the simple gliders low performance it was found that the Mü4 München was capable of soaring flight and so was used for mountain flying in the Alps near Rosenheim.

== Specifications (Mü4 München) ==
Data from Mü4

General characteristics

- Crew: 1
- Wingspan: 12.14 m (39 ft 10 in)
- Wing area: 17 m^{2} (183 sq ft)
- Aspect ratio: 8.6
- Airfoil: Göttingen 549
- Empty weight: 105 kg (231.5 lb)
- Gross weight: 185 kg (408 lb)

Performance
