= Akaflieg München Mü31 =

Single-seat German glider, 2017

Mü31
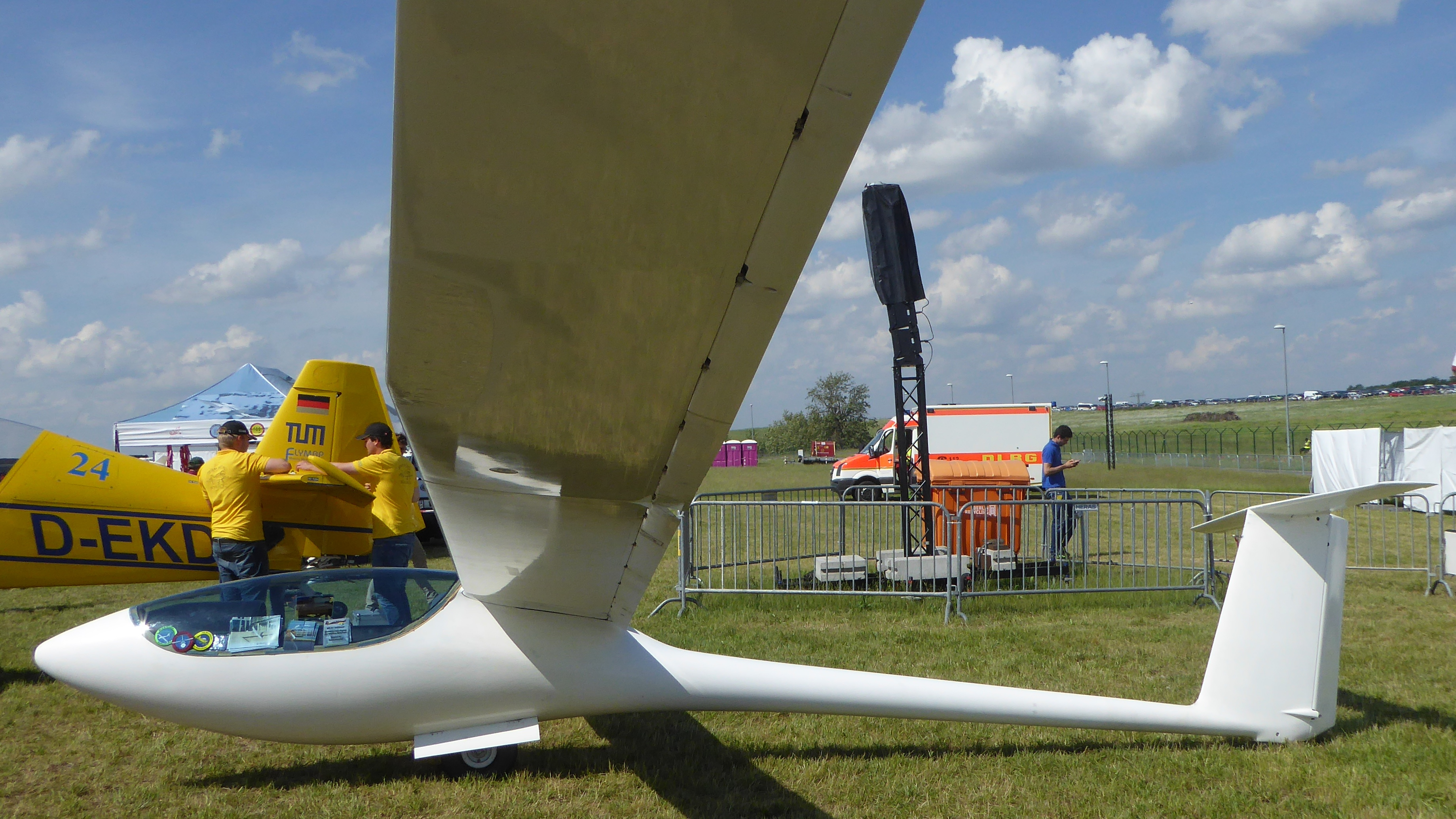
- Akaflieg Munchen Mu31 at the ILA Berlin Airshow, 2016

General information
- Type: High-performance glider aircraft
- National origin: Germany
- Manufacturer: Akaflieg München

History
- First flight: 15 September 2017

The Akaflieg München Mü31 is a high-performance single-seat glider aircraft that is under design in Germany as of 2010.

== Development ==
After completion of the Akaflieg München Mü30 Schlacro, students turned to the design of a new 15m-FAI racing class glider, with a maximum span of 15m (49 ft 3in), a maximum of 150 liters (40 US gallons) of water ballast and full-span flaps. Designated Akaflieg München Mü31, this glider is being designed to minimize interference drag between fuselage and wing root, with several variations being studied to select the ideal configuration:

- planar wing in midwing configuration (conventional).
- high-mounted wing with a swept wing root/fuselage transition.
- high-mounted wing with turbulent flow at the joint between wing and fuselage.

These concepts were wind-tunnel-tested in 2006. The third configuration was deemed to be best. The resulting fuselage wing joint is similar to a pylon with the wing suspended by the leading edge, leaving uninterrupted flow at the trailing edge. This layout has the advantages of:

continuous upper wing surface
only two intersections between fuselage and wing as opposed to four in a more conventional mounting
turbulence created by the wing/fuselage joint does not disturb flow over the rear of the fuselage pod and boom
approximately elliptical lift distribution can be attained, reducing induced drag significantly.

To keep construction costs low, the Mü31 will be built using components from the Schleicher ASW 27, such as the forward fuselage, rear fuselage and tail and outer wings.

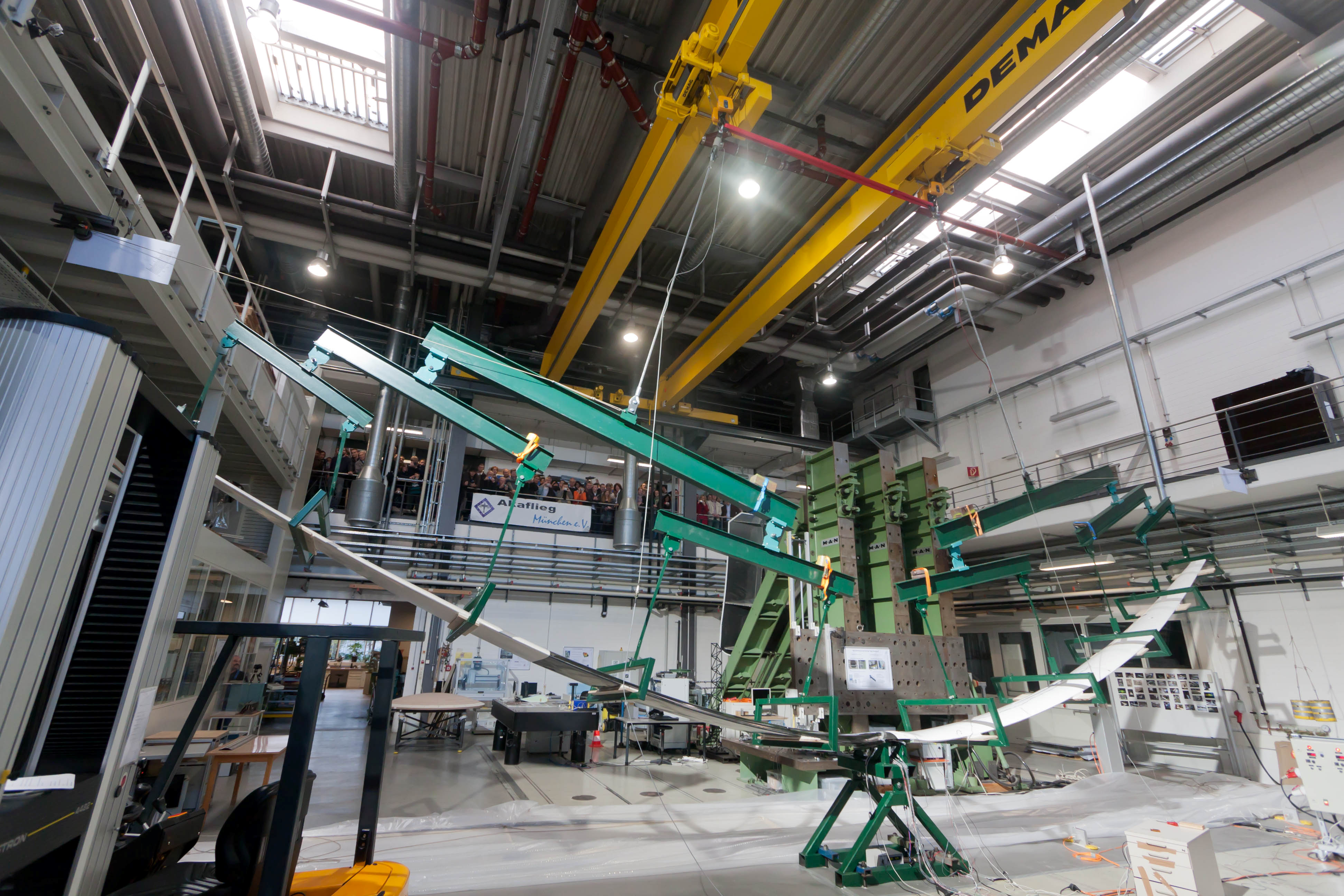
The Mü31 wings under stress testing

== Specifications and projected performance (Mü31) ==
Data from Mü31

General characteristics

- Crew: 1
- Capacity: 150 liter water ballast
- Wingspan: 15 m (49 ft 3 in)
- Wing area: 9.0 m^{2} (97 sq ft)
- Aspect ratio: 25
- Airfoil: DU 89-134/14, DU 94-086 M4
- Empty weight: 240 kg (529 lb)
- Gross weight: 500 kg (1,102 lb)

Performance

- Maximum speed: 285 km/h (177 mph, 154 kn)
- Stall speed: 67 km/h (41 mph, 36 kn)
- Rate of sink: 0.50 m/s (98 ft/min)
