= Albar Albarian =

Albarian

General information
- Type: Homebuilt aircraft
- National origin: United States
- Designer: Lavigne Albar

History
- Developed from: Luscombe

The Albar Albarian is an American aircraft designed for homebuilt construction.

== Design and development ==
The Albarian is a two place, single engine, strut-braced, high wing aircraft with conventional landing gear. The fuselage is constructed of welded steel tubing with aircraft fabric covering. The wings are sourced from a Luscombe 8 with flap modifications for STOL performance.

== Specifications (Albar Albarian) ==
Data from Air Progress

General characteristics

- Crew: 1
- Capacity: 1
- Length: 22 ft (6.7 m)
- Wingspan: 35 ft (11 m)
- Empty weight: 675 lb (306 kg)
- Gross weight: 995 lb (451 kg)
- Powerplant: 1 × Continental C-90B horizontally opposed piston aircraft engine, 90 hp (67 kW)
- Propellers: 2-bladed

Performance

- Maximum speed: 120 kn (140 mph, 230 km/h)
- Cruise speed: 91 kn (105 mph, 169 km/h)
- Stall speed: 33 kn (38 mph, 61 km/h)
- Rate of climb: 950 ft/min (4.8 m/s)

== See also ==
Aircraft of comparable role, configuration, and era

- Bearhawk LSA
