= Coelho AC-11 =

Brazilian homebuilt aircraft

AC-11

General information
- Type: Homebuilt aircraft
- National origin: Brazil
- Manufacturer: Altair Coelho
- Status: Production completed (1994)
- Number built: One

The Coelho AC-11 (also called the AC.11 and AC 11) is a Brazilian homebuilt aircraft that was designed and produced by Altair Coelho of Eldorado do Sul and introduced in 1994. The aircraft was intended to be supplied as a kit for amateur construction, but only one was completed.

== Design and development ==
The aircraft features a V-strut-braced low-wing, a two-seats-in-side-by-side configuration enclosed cockpit, fixed tricycle landing gear or optionally conventional landing gear and a single engine in tractor configuration.

The aircraft fuselage is made from welded steel tube, while the wing is plywood, with some surfaces covered in doped aircraft fabric and some covered in plywood. Its 8.08 m (26.5 ft) span wing has a wing area of 13.7 m^{2} (147 sq ft) and employs a NACA 4412 airfoil. The cabin width is 108 cm (43 in). The acceptable power range is 70 to 105 hp (52 to 78 kW) and the engine used for the prototype was a 2,000 cc (122.0 cu in) 105 hp (78 kW) Volkswagen air-cooled engine with a steel-pulley and polyurethane chain-driven 2:1 reduction drive.

The aircraft has a typical empty weight of 290 kg (640 lb) and a gross weight of 520 kg (1,150 lb), giving a useful load of 230 kg (510 lb). With full fuel of 76 litres (17 imp gal; 20 US gal) the payload for pilot, passenger and baggage is 109 kg (240 lb).

The standard day, sea level, no wind, take off with a 105 hp (78 kW) engine is 140 m (459 ft) and the landing roll is 200 m (656 ft).

The manufacturer estimated the construction time of the prototype as 1600 hours.

== Operational history ==
By 1998 the company reported that one conventional gear version of the aircraft was completed and flying, while a tricycle gear version was under construction.

== Specifications (AC-11) ==
Data from AeroCrafter

General characteristics

- Crew: one
- Capacity: one passenger
- Length: 5.79 m (19 ft 0 in)
- Wingspan: 8.08 m (26 ft 6 in)
- Wing area: 13.7 m^{2} (147 sq ft)
- Empty weight: 290 kg (639 lb)
- Gross weight: 520 kg (1,146 lb)
- Fuel capacity: 76 litres (17 imp gal; 20 US gal)
- Powerplant: 1 × Volkswagen air-cooled engine four cylinder, 2,000 cc (122.0 cu in), four stroke automotive conversion, with a steel-pulley and polyurethane chain-driven 2:1 reduction drive, 78 kW (105 hp)
- Propellers: 2-bladed wooden fixed pitch

Performance

- Maximum speed: 169 km/h (105 mph, 91 kn)
- Cruise speed: 153 km/h (95 mph, 83 kn)
- Stall speed: 68 km/h (42 mph, 36 kn) in clean configuration
- Range: 550 km (340 mi, 300 nmi)
- Rate of climb: 4.7 m/s (920 ft/min)
- Wing loading: 38 kg/m^{2} (7.8 lb/sq ft)
