= Akaflieg München Mü11 Papagei =

German single-seat glider, 1935

General information
- Type: Primary Training Glider
- National origin: Germany
- Manufacturer: Akaflieg München

History
- First flight: 1935

The Akaflieg München Mü11 Papagei is a primary glider that was designed and built in Germany in 1935.

== Development ==
The Mü11 Papagei, (Parrot), was a Primary style training glider similar to the SG-38 but with a Mü Scheibe aerofoil section. The design was intended for beginner training and retained dimensions broadly comparable to established training gliders, while incorporating features such as a steel-tube wing pylon intended to absorb landing shocks and facilitate repairs. Flight trials were carried out but there is very little information available. Only one photograph and a contemporary model survive. The photograph shows the pilots seat surrounded by a plywood nacelle.

Data from Mü11 "Papagei"

General characteristics

- Crew: 1

Performance
