= American Gyro AG-4 Crusader =

AG-4 Crusader

General information
- National origin: United States
- Manufacturer: American Gyro Company
- Designer: Thomas M. Shelton

History
- Introduction date: 1935
- First flight: 1935

The American Gyro AG-4 Crusader is a small twin engine aircraft. The aircraft was designed as the Shelton Flying Wing in 1933 by Thomas Miles Shelton.

== Design ==
The AG-4 was developed using wind tunnel tests. The American Gyro AG-4 Crusader is an aluminum skinned four place low-wing twin engine aircraft with fixed conventional landing gear, twin tail booms with individual rudders, and a teardrop shaped fuselage. The wing uses trailing edge flaps and 25 gallon fuel tanks are mounted in each wing root. Retractable landing gear were also tested on the model.

== Operational history ==
The prototype was painted a copper color with green leather seats. It was tested in 1935 at Denver Colorado. The aircraft was funded from stock issued in the Crusader Aircraft Corporation, a parent of the American Gyro Company. The company folded in 1938 under securities fraud investigations before the Crusader could go into production

== Popular culture ==
Tootsietoy came out with a die-cast metal toy of the plane, No. 719 in its catalogue. Hubley and Wyandotte also made toys based on the Shelton Flying Wing.

== Variants ==
American Gyro AG-4 Crusader
American Gyro AG-6 Buccaneer
A six place variant design powered by Menasco engines

== Specifications (AG-4 Crusader) ==
Data from AAHS Journal

General characteristics

- Crew: 1
- Capacity: 3 passengers
- Length: 21 ft 7 in (6.58 m)
- Wingspan: 36 ft (11 m)
- Height: 7 ft (2.1 m)
- Wing area: 206 sq ft (19.1 m^{2})
- Empty weight: 2,000 lb (907 kg)
- Gross weight: 3,000 lb (1,361 kg)
- Fuel capacity: 50 gal
- Powerplant: 2 × Menasco C4-S Inline four cylinder piston, 150 hp (110 kW) each
- Propellers: 2-bladed

Performance

- Maximum speed: 202 kn (233 mph, 375 km/h)
- Cruise speed: 180 kn (210 mph, 340 km/h)
- Range: 520 nmi (600 mi, 970 km)
- Service ceiling: 24,000 ft (7,300 m)
- Rate of climb: 1,760 ft/min (8.9 m/s)

== Bibliography ==
- "American Gyro Crusader". Aero Digest. Vol. 26, no. 4. April 1935. p. 52.
- Roca, Alexander Crusader: The Story of the Shelton Flying Wing, its Company, and its Creator Rare Birds Publishing; 1st edition (1989) ISBN 978-0962288609
