= American Patriot Supercruiser =

American homebuilt aircraft

Patriot Supercruiser

General information
- Type: Amateur-built aircraft
- National origin: United States
- Manufacturer: American Patriot Aircraft
- Status: Only one prototype completed (2011)
- Number built: 1 (2011)

History
- Introduction date: circa 2007

The American Patriot Supercruiser, also called the Patriot II, is an American amateur-built aircraft, that was designed and produced by American Patriot Aircraft of Westfield, Wisconsin. The aircraft was intended to be supplied as a kit for amateur construction.

While the aircraft was still offered for sale in April 2011 the company appears to have gone out of business in late 2011, having completed only the prototype.

== Design and development ==
The Supercruiser features a strut-braced high-wing, two-seats in side-by-side configuration in an enclosed egg-shaped cockpit accessed via doors, a twin tail, fixed tricycle landing gear and a single engine in pusher configuration.

The aircraft is made from aluminum alloy sheet. Its 30 ft (9.1 m) span wing has an area of 137 sq ft (12.7 m^{2}) and mounts flaperons. The aircraft's recommended engine power range is 80 to 175 hp (60 to 130 kW) and standard engines used include the 115 hp (86 kW) Subaru EA 81 automotive conversion four-stroke powerplant. The cabin width is 49 in (124 cm) and construction time from the supplied kit was to be 400 hours.

The company had indicated that they were pursuing light-sport aircraft certification in 2011, but as of September 2016, the design does not appear on the Federal Aviation Administration's list of approved special light-sport aircraft.

By December 2011 only one example, the prototype, was listed as completed. The US Federal Aviation Administration indicates that its registration expired on 30 September 2012 and was not renewed.

== Specifications (Patriot Supercruiser) ==
Data from Kitplanes and American Patriot Aircraft

General characteristics

- Crew: one
- Capacity: one passenger
- Length: 21 ft (6.4 m)
- Wingspan: 30 ft (9.1 m)
- Wing area: 137 sq ft (12.7 m^{2})
- Empty weight: 760 lb (345 kg)
- Gross weight: 1,320 lb (599 kg)
- Fuel capacity: 40 U.S. gallons (150 L; 33 imp gal)
- Powerplant: 1 × Subaru EA 81 four cylinder, air-cooled, four stroke automotive conversion, 115 hp (86 kW)
- Propellers: 3-bladed composite

Performance

- Cruise speed: 135 mph (217 km/h, 117 kn)
- Stall speed: 50 mph (80 km/h, 43 kn) flaperons up, 44 mph (71 km/h) flaperons down
- Range: 850 mi (1,370 km, 740 nmi)
- Rate of climb: 1,400 ft/min (7.1 m/s)
- Wing loading: 9.6 lb/sq ft (47 kg/m^{2})
