= Airframes Unlimited =

American homebuilt aircraft manufacturer

- Industry: Aerospace
- Founder: Don and Clint Stutts
- Defunct: late 2014
- Fate: Out of business
- Headquarters: Athens, Texas and Cloudcroft, New Mexico, United States
- Products: Powered parachutes
- Owner: Don Stutts
- Website: www.airframesunlimited.com

Airframes Unlimited was an American aircraft manufacturer founded by Don and Clint Stutts of Athens, Texas. The company started out marketing powered parachute plans on CD-ROM and expanded into providing parts and sub-assemblies, as well as complete airframes.

In an interview in Light Sport and Ultralight Flying Magazine Don Stutts explained his focus on the low-end of the market, stating, "our company's goal is to make powered parachuting more affordable to the average working man. We are living in an era where $15,000 to $20,000 powered parachutes are common. Powered parachutes in this price range are completely out of reach of an average working man, even with creative financing."

The company originally operated as Powered Parachute Plans, also of Athens, Texas. When parts for complete aircraft were made available these were supplied by Airframes Unlimited and gradually the two enterprises were unified under the latter name.

The company seems to have gone out of business in late 2014.

== Aircraft ==
Summary of aircraft built by Airframes Unlimited
Model name	First flight	Number built	Type
Airframes Unlimited Hyperlite			Powered parachute
Airframes Unlimited Skeeter			Powered parachute
Airframes Unlimited SS-2 Trainer	2003	At least 8	Powered parachute
Airframes Unlimited Super 103			Powered parachute
Airframes Unlimited T-2			Powered parachute
Airframes Unlimited T-103			Powered parachute
