= Akaflieg München Mü12 Kiwi =

German single-seat glider, 1935

Mü12 Kiwi
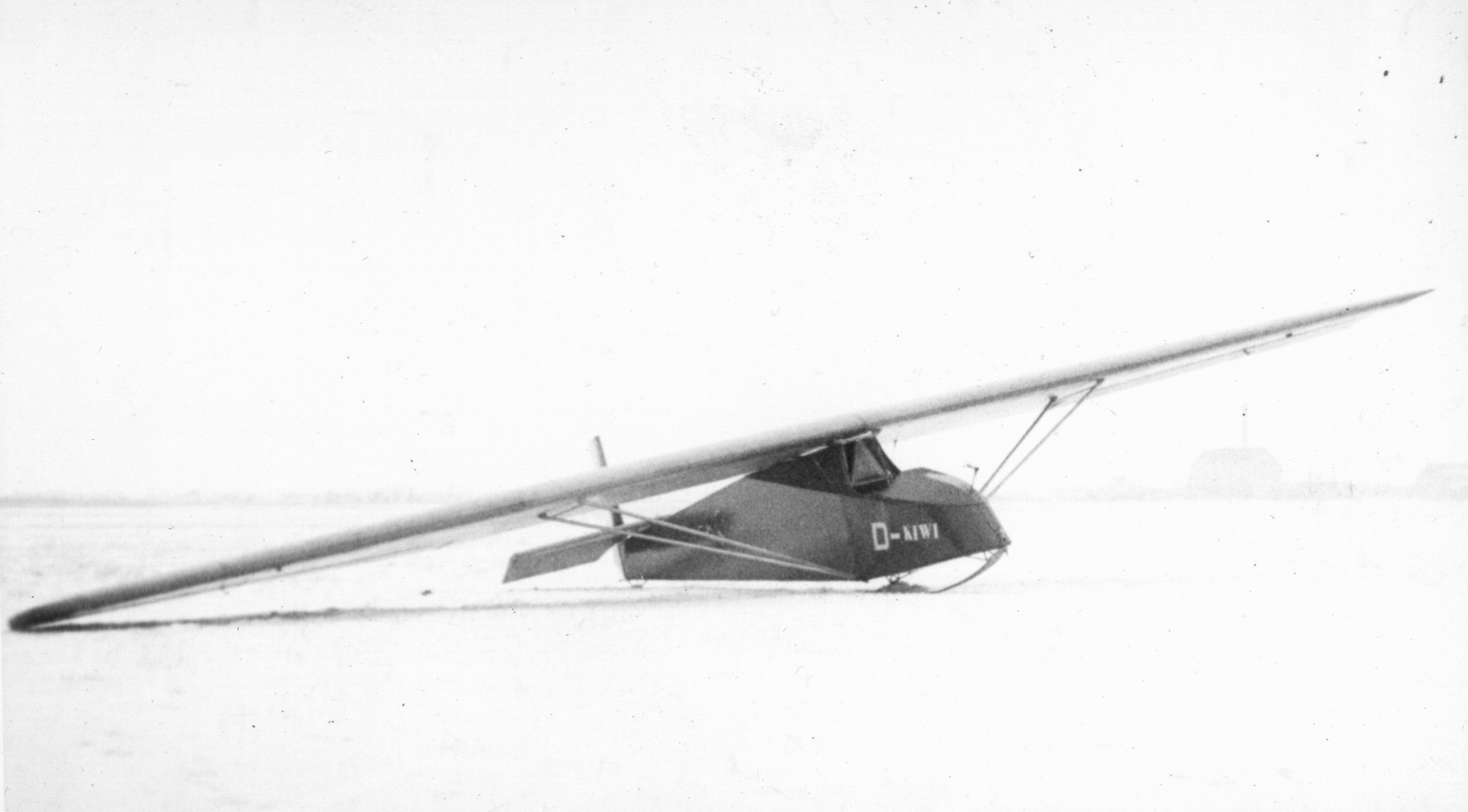

General information
- Type: Training glider
- National origin: Germany
- Manufacturer: Akaflieg München
- Number built: 1

History
- First flight: 1935

The Akaflieg München Mü12 Kiwi is a glider that was designed and built in Germany in 1935.

== Development ==
The Mü12 Kiwi was conceived in 1935 as a single-seat training glider of simple and rugged construction with a high strutted wing and a plywood covered rhomboid section fuselage. Flight testing revealed a glider with good control response but less than satisfactory approach control. Due to various problems certification of the Mü12 Kiwi was delayed to the end of 1935 and finally abandoned.

== Specifications (Mü12 Kiwi) ==
Data from Mü12 "Kiwi"

General characteristics

- Crew: 1
- Wingspan: 12.35 m (40 ft 6 in)
- Wing area: 16.46 m^{2} (177 sq ft)
- Aspect ratio: 9.7
- Empty weight: 114.7 kg (376 lb)
- Gross weight: 200 kg (656 lb)

Performance
