= Airbet Girabet =

Girabet
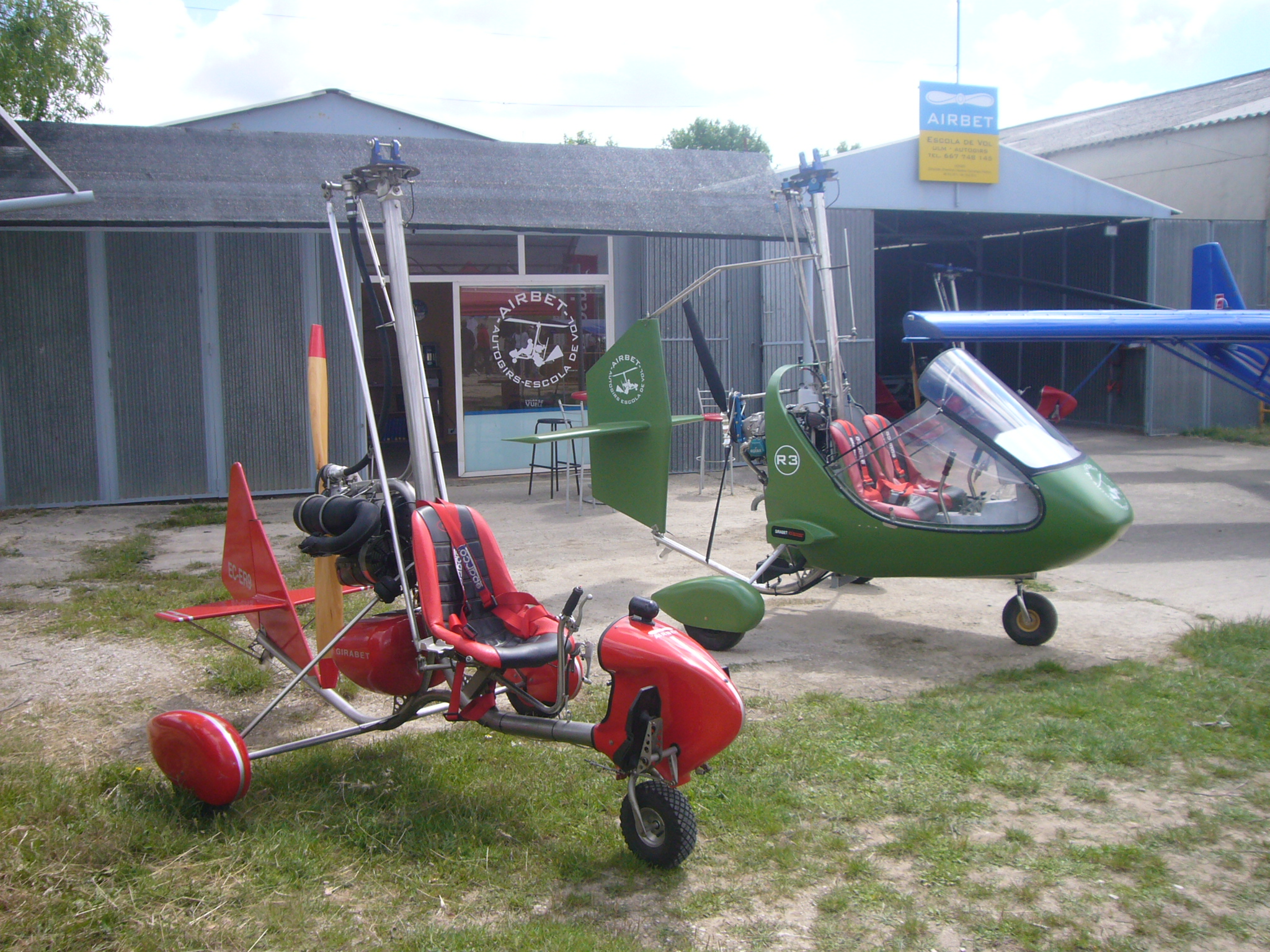

General information
- Type: Autogyro
- National origin: Spain
- Manufacturer: Airbet
- Status: In production

The Airbet Girabet is a family of Spanish autogyros, designed and produced by Airbet of Barcelona. They are all supplied as complete ready-to-fly-aircraft.

== Design and development ==
The Girabet family of designs all feature a single main rotor, tricycle landing gear and Rotax two-stroke and four-stroke engines mounted in pusher configuration. The aircraft fuselage is made from curved steel and aluminium tubing and mounts a cruciform tail. All rotor blades and other dynamic components are built by the company in-house. All models fit pre-rotators to shorten take-off distances.

== Variants ==
Girabet Classic
Original single seat model, powered by a 50 hp (37 kW) Rotax 503 twin cylinder, air-cooled, two-stroke, dual-ignition powerplant. Its 7.30 m (24.0 ft) diameter rotor has a chord of 21 cm (8.3 in). The aircraft has an empty weight of 118 kg (260 lb) and a gross weight of 230 kg (510 lb), giving a useful load of 112 kg (247 lb). The company also offers a custom-built trailer for ground transportation and home storage.
Girabet 582
More powerful single seat model, powered by a 64 hp (48 kW) Rotax 582 twin cylinder, liquid-cooled, two-stroke, dual-ignition powerplant. Its 7.30 m (24.0 ft) diameter rotor has a chord of 21 cm (8.3 in). The aircraft has an empty weight of 120 kg (260 lb) and a gross weight of 230 kg (510 lb), giving a useful load of 110 kg (240 lb). Take-off roll with the pre-rotator is 20 m (65.6 ft).
Girabet 2
Side-by-side configuration two seat model intended for use as a trainer, powered by a 100 hp (75 kW) Rotax 912S four cylinder, air and liquid-cooled, four-stroke, dual-ignition powerplant. Its 8.40 m (27.6 ft) diameter rotor has a chord of 21 cm (8.3 in). The aircraft has an empty weight of 175 kg (386 lb) and a gross weight of 410 kg (900 lb), giving a useful load of 235 kg (518 lb).
Girabet 2 Sport
Side-by-side configuration two seat model intended for use as a cross country aircraft and equipped with a cockpit fairing and windshield. Powered by a 100 hp (75 kW) Rotax 912S four cylinder, air and liquid-cooled, four-stroke, dual-ignition powerplant, its 8.40 m (27.6 ft) diameter rotor has a chord of 21 cm (8.3 in). The aircraft has an empty weight of 220 kg (490 lb) and a gross weight of 450 kg (990 lb), giving a useful load of 230 kg (510 lb).

== Specifications (Girabet 582) ==
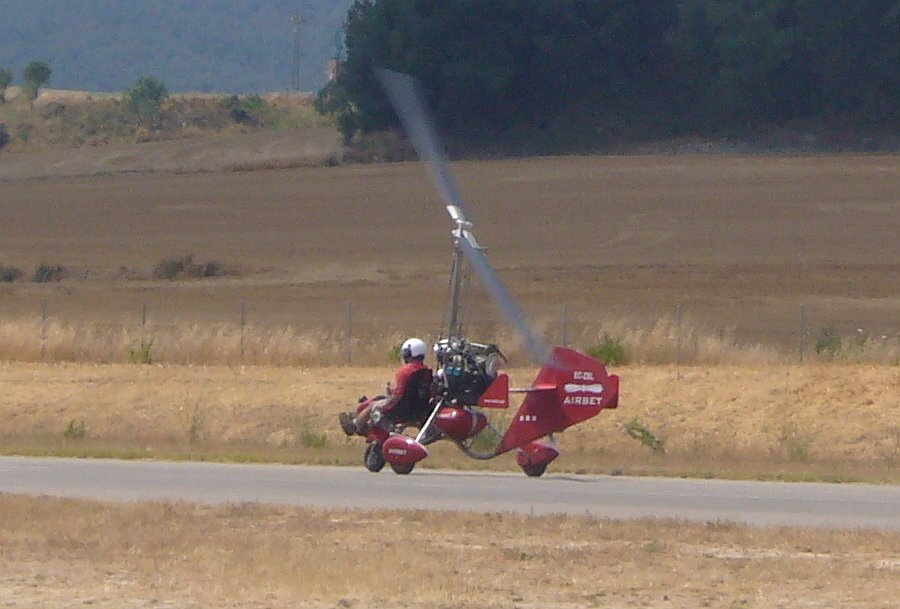
Airbet Girabet

Data from Bayerl

General characteristics

- Crew: one
- Empty weight: 120 kg (265 lb)
- Gross weight: 230 kg (507 lb)
- Fuel capacity: 42 litres (9.2 imp gal; 11 US gal)
- Powerplant: 1 × Rotax 582 two cylinder, air-cooled, two stroke aircraft engine, 48 kW (64 hp)
- Main rotor diameter: 7.3 m (23 ft 11 in)
- Propellers: 3-bladed composite

Performance

- Maximum speed: 140 km/h (87 mph, 76 kn)
- Cruise speed: 105 km/h (65 mph, 57 kn)
- Rate of climb: 9 m/s (1,800 ft/min)
