= Alder & Derryberry A =

American 1930s light sport aircraft

Alder & Derryberry Model A
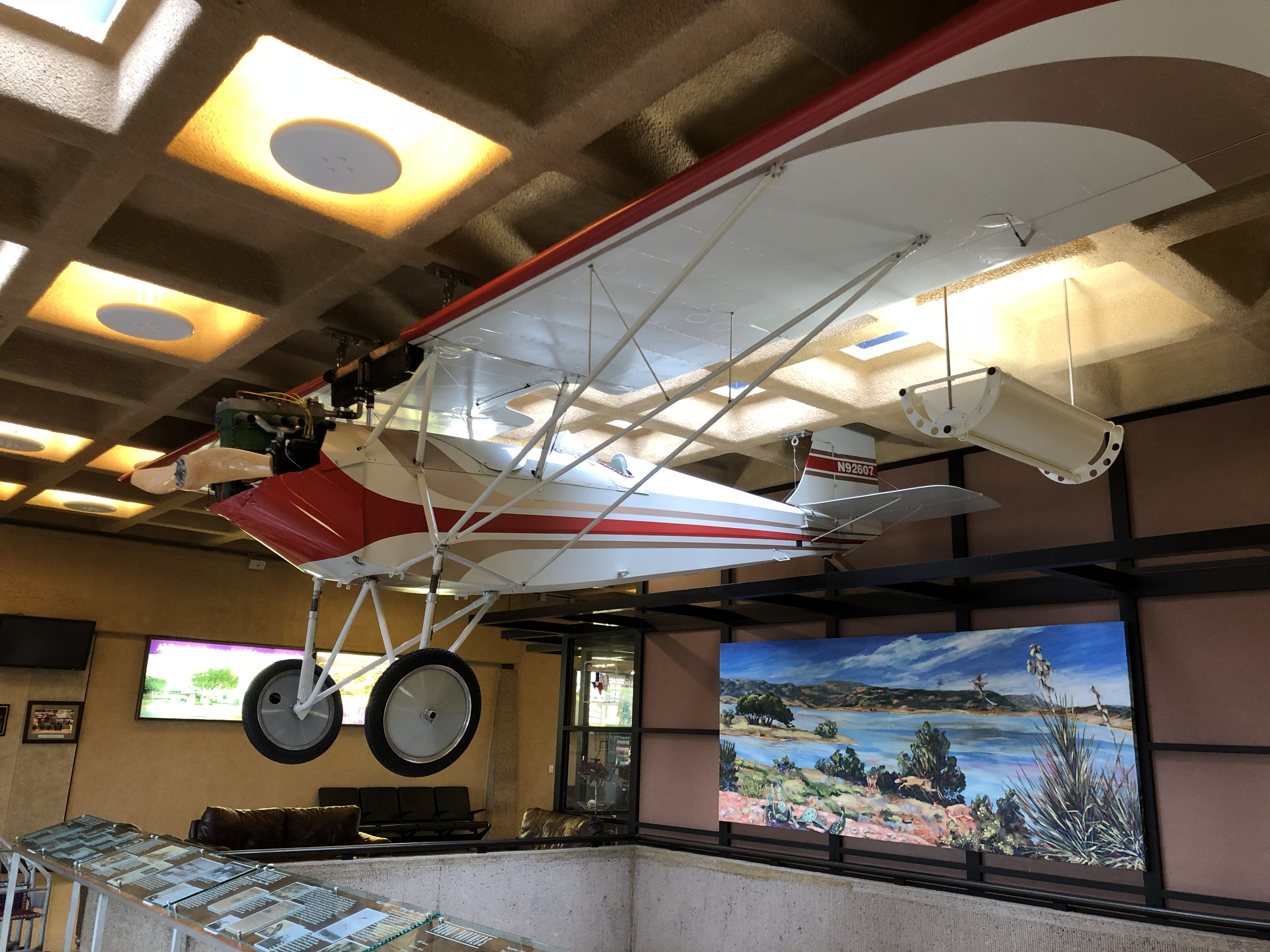
- Alder & Derryberry Model A at the Abilene Regional Airport

General information
- Type: Sportsplane/trainer
- National origin: United States
- Manufacturer: Alder & Derryberry
- Number built: 1

History
- First flight: 1935

The Alder & Derryberry A is an American three-seat single-engine parasol monoplane sporting and training aircraft. It was manufactured by C Alder & L E Derryberry in Abilene, Texas in 1935. The powerplant was identified as a Ford Model A engine.

== Aircraft on display ==
Sometime prior to 1980, the sole example was acquired disassembled and was stored in Tulsa as one of many pending restoration projects, however, after the owner suffered a stroke in 2004, the A-D was resold and restored to flying condition, receiving its certificate of airworthiness in 2008, before being donated to the city of Abilene in 2011, who have it on display at the local airport.

== Specifications (Alder & Derryberry model A) ==
General characteristics

- Crew: One
- Capacity: 2
- Powerplant: 1 × Ford model A inline 4 cylinder water-cooled L-head car engine, 37 hp (28 kW)

Performance
