= Akaflieg München Mü8 =

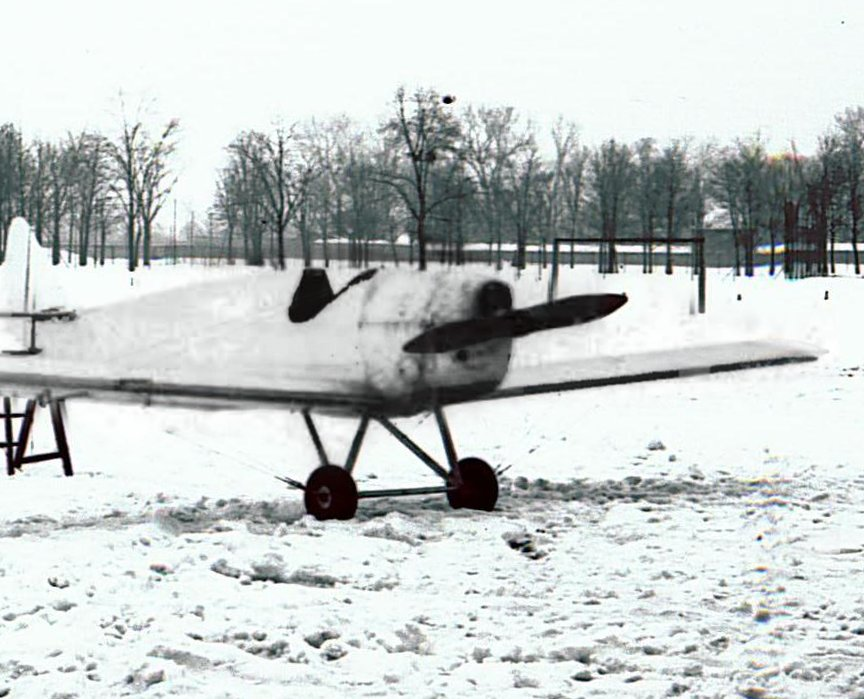

General information
- Type: Light Aircraft
- National origin: Germany
- Manufacturer: Akaflieg München
- Number built: 1

History
- First flight: 1933

The Akaflieg München Mü8 is a light sports aircraft that was designed and built in Germany in 1933.

== Development ==
The first powered aircraft to be built by Akaflieg München was the Mü8, an uncomplicated aircraft in design and construction, cheap to build and operate. Constructed from wood throughout the Mü8 was a single-seat open cockpit aircraft with a wire-braced low wing covered with fabric. Power came from a 15 kW (20 hp) DKW engine, initially but this was replaced by a 12 kW (16 hp) unit later with a commensurate reduction in performance, maximum level speed reducing from 130 km/h (81 mph) to 105 km/h (65 mph). The Akaflieg München Mü14 was an unbuilt development of the Mü8 powered by a 15 kW engine.

== Variants ==
- Akaflieg München Mü8 - The sole prototype of this low wing sport aircraft.
- Akaflieg München Mü14 - a proposed development of the Mü8.

== Specifications (Mü8) ==
Data from Mü8

General characteristics

- Crew: 1
- Wingspan: 8.6 m (92 ft 7 in)
- Wing area: 10 m^{2} (108 sq ft)
- Aspect ratio: 7.4
- Airfoil: Göttingen 633
- Empty weight: 180 kg (397 lb)
- Gross weight: 280 kg (617 lb)
- Powerplant: 1 × DKW , 15 kW (20 hp)

Performance

- Rate of sink: 1.5 m/s (295 ft/min)
