= Alekseyev I-218 =

General information
- Type: Attack
- National origin: USSR
- Manufacturer: Alekseyev
- Designer: Semyon Mikhailovich Alekseyev
- Number built: 1

The I-218 was an attack aircraft designed and built in the USSR from 1947.

== Development ==
Alekseyev designed the I-218 as a heavily armed, and armoured, attack aircraft for use in close support and anti-tank missions. The twin boom aircraft had a central nacelle housing the pilot and gunners cockpits as well as the engine and forward firing armament. All armoured and highly stressed parts were manufactured from 30KhGSNA nickel-steel. Flight testing may have commenced in 1948, but there is no direct evidence of this. Shortly after completion Alekseyev's OKB was closed and Alekseyev was sent to TsAGI (Tsentrahl'nyy Aerodinamicheskiy i Ghidrodinamicheskiy Institoot- central aerodynamics and hydrodynamics institute) before being given the task of supervising Dr. Brunolf Baade and his German team at OKB-1. The designation I-218 is in doubt and the aircraft may have been called, simply 218.

== Variants ==
- I-219 - (a.k.a. I-218-Ib) Tailwheel undercarriage, revised crew compartment and swept fins.
- I-221 - (a.k.a. I-218-II) Enlarged jet-powered aircraft with one Lyulka TR-3 turbojet
- I-220 - (a.k.a. I-218-III) The I-218-III powered with the Dobrynin VD-4 without turbo-chargers, driving pusher contra-props at the rear of the fuselage.

== Specifications (I-218) ==
General characteristics

- Crew: 2
- Length: 13.88 m (45 ft 6.5 in)
- Wingspan: 16.43 m (53 ft 10.75 in)
- Wing area: 45 m^{2} (484.4 sq ft)
- Gross weight: 9,000 kg (19,840 lb)
- Powerplant: × Dobrynin VD-251 , 1,491 kW (2,000 hp)

Performance

- Maximum speed: 530 km/h (329 mph, 286 kn)
- Service ceiling: 6,600 m (21,650 ft)
- Rate of climb: 16.67 m/s (3,280 ft/min)

Armament

- 2 × 23mm Nudelman-Rikhter NR-23 cannon, 1 each in remote-controlled barbettes fitted on the outside of each tail boom.
- 4 × 23mm Nudelman-Rikhter NR-23 cannon fixed in the lower forward fuselage.
- 1500 kg (3,307 lb) of bombs on under-fuselage pylons.
- 16 rockets carried under the outer wings.

== See also ==
Related lists

- List of aircraft
