= Akaflieg München Mü6 =

German single-seat glider

General information
- Type: Glider aircraft
- National origin: Germany
- Manufacturer: Akaflieg München
- Number built: 1

History
- First flight: 1931

The Akaflieg München Mü6 is a glider aircraft that was designed and built in Germany in 1924.

== Development ==
In 1931 Akaflieg München students Egon Scheibe and Victor Urban designed the Akaflieg München Mü6 to investigate Aero-towing, the new art of launching gliders. To ensure easy handling during tow, the aircraft was made light and robust (of fabric-covered-wood construction), with good handling characteristics. A strut-supported high-mounted wing was fitted on a rhomboidal section fuselage and a conventional empennage.

The Mü6 survived until at least 1934 when it was noted that total flight time was 23 hours which includes the time taken for Egon Scheibe to fly his 105 km flight to Regensburg in 1933.

== Specifications (Mü6) ==
Data from Mü6

General characteristics

- Crew: 1
- Wingspan: 14 m (45 ft 11 in)
- Wing area: 16.5 m^{2} (178 sq ft)
- Aspect ratio: 11.9
- Airfoil: Göttingen 549
- Empty weight: 125 kg (276 lb)
- Gross weight: 210 kg (463 lb)

Performance

- Rate of sink: 0.78 m/s (154 ft/min)
