= Sky Sentinel =

Unmanned airship

Sky Sentinel is an unmanned aerial vehicle (UAV) airship designed for long-duration operation of an automated surveillance platform.

The airship flies at altitudes up to 3,000 meters (10,000 ft) and can remain aloft for up to 18 hours. It carries a sensor suite payload of up to 140 kilograms (300 lb). The airship is 30 m (98 ft) long and contains 740 m^{3} (26,000 cu ft) of helium to provide lift.

A follow-on model—Sky Sentinel 2— is planned to support flying at altitudes up to 3,000 meters (10,000 ft) while remaining aloft for up to 26 hours with a 180 kilograms (400 lb) sensor suite.
