= Albatros L 56 =

Experimental transport biplane

The Albatros L 56 was an experimental open transport biplane. It was cancelled when aircraft such as the Fokker F.II, Junkers F 13, and Sablatnig P.III were built.

== Specifications ==
- Engine: 1 Benz Bz.IV
- Length: 9.25 meters
- Span: 15.68 meters
- Weight: 1040 kilograms empty, 1800 kilograms when flying
