= Akaflieg München Mü16 =

German single-seat glider project, 1938

General information
- Type: Sailplane
- National origin: Germany
- Manufacturer: Akaflieg München

The Akaflieg München Mü16 was a glider that was designed in Germany from 1938.

== Development ==
With a quoted L/D of 50 and min. sink of 0.4 m/s (79 ft/m) @ 52 km/h (32 mph) the Mü16 would have been one of the highest performance gliders in the world circa 1938, if it had been built. The 25m(82 ft 1in) high aspect ratio, four section, thin wings would have sat on top of a rhomboidal section fuselage housing the pilot lying in a prone position, to reduce frontal area and thus drag. Instruments were to have been viewed via a mirror to reduce stress on the pilots neck.

Air brakes were to be fitted to the rear fuselage sides because the wings were too thin and filled with structural parts leaving little room for the mechanism, as well as reducing stress points and thus structural weight. Unfortunately the aerodynamic equations used to calculate the proposed performance have been lost so the ambitious claims cannot be verified, in any event the technology available in 1938 would have made building the Mü16, and achieving the extraordinary performance claimed, extremely difficult.

== Specifications (Mü16) ==
Data from

General characteristics

- Crew: 1
- Wingspan: 25 m (82 ft 1 in)
- Wing area: 15.6 m^{2} (168 sq ft)
- Empty weight: 230 kg (507 lb)

Performance

- Maximum glide ratio: 50
- Rate of sink: 0.40 m/s (79 ft/min) at 52km/h (32mph)
