= Akaflieg München Mü2 Münchner Kindl =

German single-seat glider, 1926

Mü2 Münchner Kindl
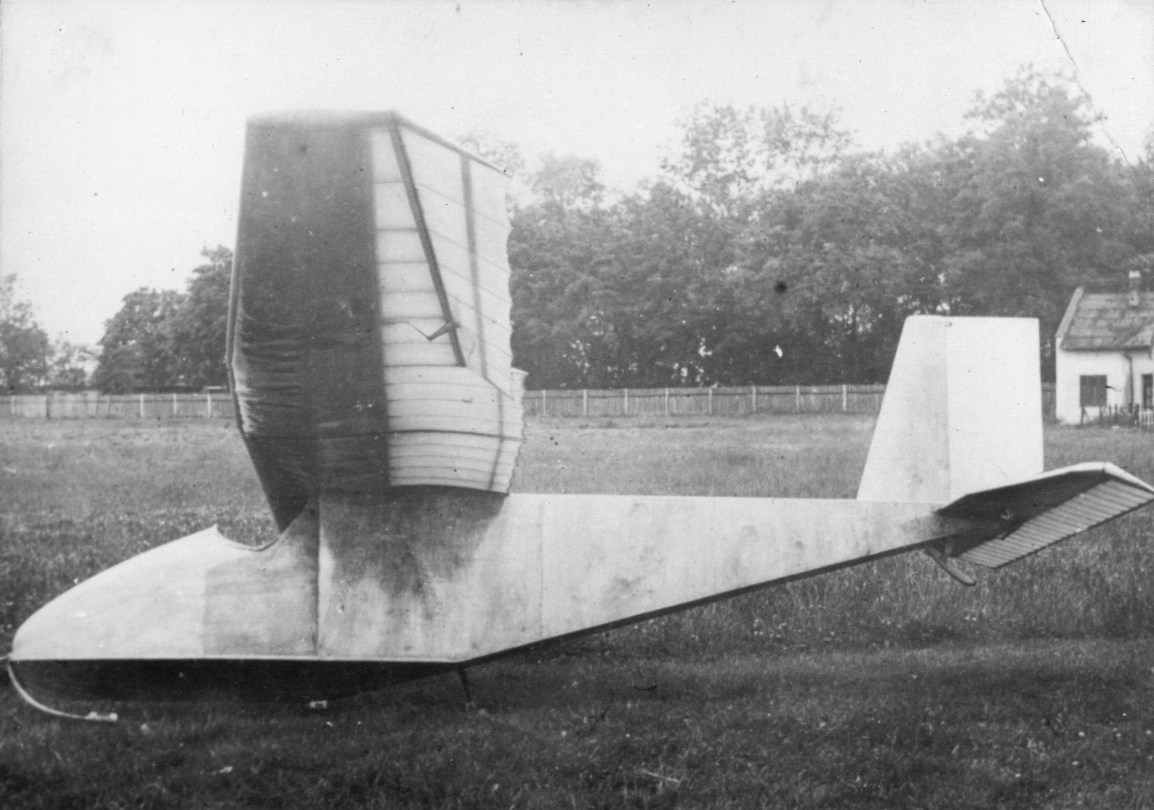

General information
- Type: Competition glider
- National origin: Germany
- Manufacturer: Akaflieg München
- Number built: 1

History
- First flight: 1926

The Akaflieg München Mü2 Münchner Kindl is a glider that was designed and built in Germany in 1926.

== Development ==
The students at Akaflieg München designed and built the Mü2 “Münchner Kindl” to participate in gliding competitions. Construction was of wood throughout with plywood and fabric covering, a high mounted, unswept, cantilever wing, built in four pieces with slightly tapered outer panels that sat on the square-section aerofoil profiled fuselage. An all-flying tailplane was mounted at the extreme end of the fuselage with a fin mounting a large rudder attached to the top of the fuselage tail.

The Mü2 "Münchner Kindl" was ready for the 1926 Rhön gliding competition at the Wasserkuppe but was retired early due to technical problems. After repairs and modifications the Mü2 "Münchner Kindl" returned to the Wasserkuppe for the 1927 Rhön meeting with success in the height gain, (205 m (673 ft)), and duration (1m:39s) categories.

== Specifications (Mü2 Münchner Kindl) ==
Data from Mü2 "Münchner Kindl"

General characteristics

- Crew: 1
- Length: 15 m (49 ft 3 in)
- Wingspan: 12.62 m (41 ft 5 in)
- Wing area: 18 m^{2} (193.75 sq ft)
- Airfoil: Göttingen 535
- Empty weight: 140 kg (309 lb)
- Gross weight: 220 kg (485 lb)

Performance

== See also ==
Related lists

- List of gliders
