= Akaflieg München Mü1 Vogel Roch =

German single-seat flying boat glider, 1924

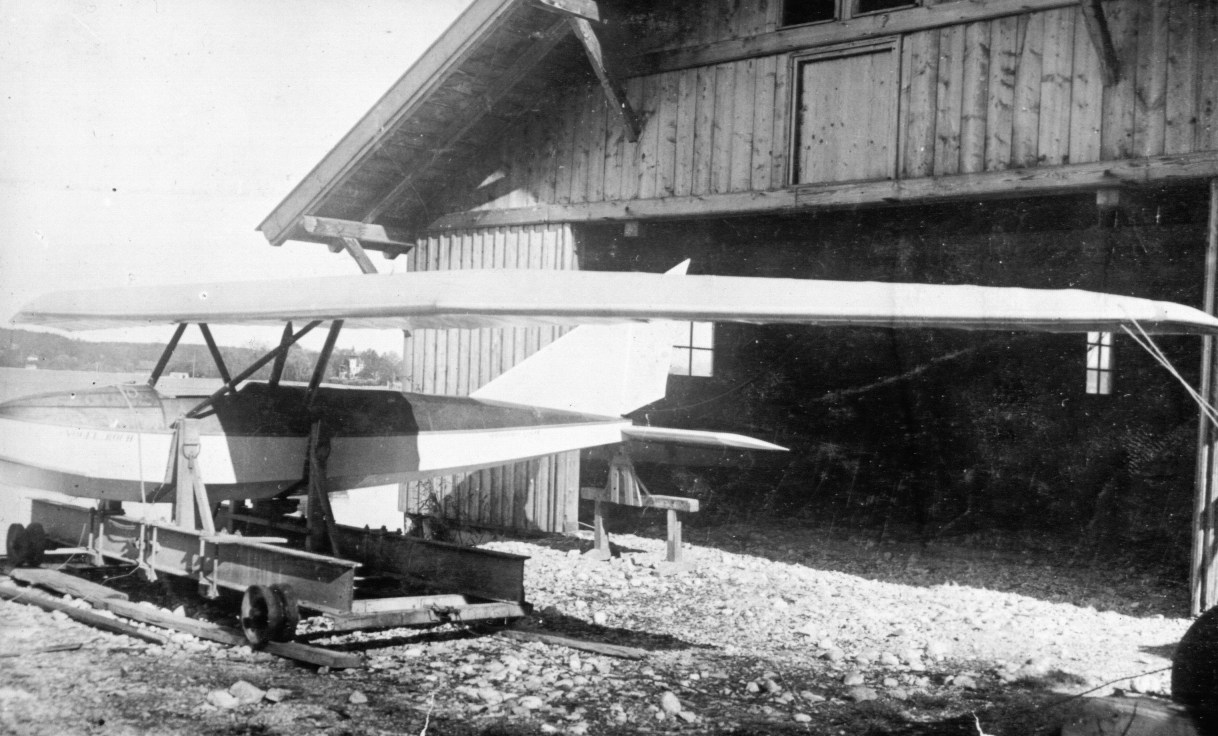

General information
- Type: Flying boat glider
- National origin: Germany
- Manufacturer: Akaflieg München
- Number built: 1

History
- First flight: 1924

The Akaflieg München Mü1 Vogel Roch is a glider that was designed and built in Germany in 1924.

== Development ==
Akaflieg München's first project, the Mü1 Vogel Roch (the Roc Bird), was designed and built shortly after the formation of the Fliegergruppe in 1924 at Hersching am Ammersee. The flying boat glider had a boat shaped hull, parasol mounted swept wings, open cockpit and a prominent fin, with wooden construction throughout. The Mü1 Vogel Roch was launched from a slipway on the Ammersee and towed into the air by a speedboat for flight testing.

== Specifications (Mü1 Vogel Roch) ==
Data from Mü1 "Vogel Roch"

General characteristics

- Crew: 1
- Wingspan: 12.62 m (41 ft 5 in)
- Wing area: 16 m^{2} (172.2 sq ft)
- Aspect ratio: 9.9
- Airfoil: Göttingen 441
- Empty weight: 135 kg (297.6 lb)
- Gross weight: 215 kg (474 lb)

Performance

== See also ==
Related lists

- List of gliders
