= Albatros D.VIII =

General information
- Type: Fighter
- National origin: Germany
- Manufacturer: Albatros Flugzeugwerke

Albatros D.VIII was the Idflieg designation for the Albatros L.35 single seat fighter.
