= Aichi C4A =

Japanese reconnaissance aircraft project

General information
- Type: Carrier-based reconnaissance aircraft
- National origin: Japan
- Manufacturer: Aichi Kokuki
- Status: project only
- Primary user: Imperial Japanese Navy Air Service (intended)
- Number built: 0

The Aichi C4A, company designation Aichi AM-20, experimental designation Aichi 13-Shi High-speed Reconnaissance Aircraft, was a late 1930s project by Aichi for a carrier-borne reconnaissance aircraft.

== Design and development ==
In the late 1930s, the Imperial Japanese Navy Air Service (IJNAS), having felt impressed at the performance of the Mitsubishi Ki-15 for the Imperial Japanese Army Air Service (IJAAS), issued a requirement for a fast reconnaissance aircraft under the IJNAS designation 13-Shi High-speed Reconnaissance Aircraft. Aichi, drawing upon experience designing the Aichi D3A, proposed a single-engine, low wing monoplane powered by a radial engine and fitted with a closed cockpit with two seats in tandem, as well as a rear-mounted 7.7 mm (0.303 in) machine gun. The design was known by the experimental designation and allocated the short designation C4A by the IJNAS.

A full-scale mockup was completed in March 1939 for inspection by IJN officials. However, the IJN decided to shelve the C4A in favor of their own version of the Ki-15, the C5M.
