= Akaflieg Hannover AFH-24 =

Single-seat German glider, 1980

AFH-24

General information
- Type: single seat sailplane
- National origin: Germany
- Manufacturer: Akaflieg Hannover
- Number built: 1

The Akaflieg Hannover AFH-24 is a training glider designed and built in Germany.

== Specifications ==
Data from

General characteristics

- Crew: 1
- Wingspan: 15.00 m (49 ft 3 in)
- Wing area: 10.27 m^{2} (110.5 sq ft)
- Aspect ratio: 21.91
- Airfoil: HQ
- Empty weight: 245 kg (540 lb)
- Gross weight: 500 kg (1,102 lb)
- Wing loading: 46.7 kg/m^{2} (9.6 lb/sq ft)
