= Albatros L 78 =

Reconnaissance aircraft

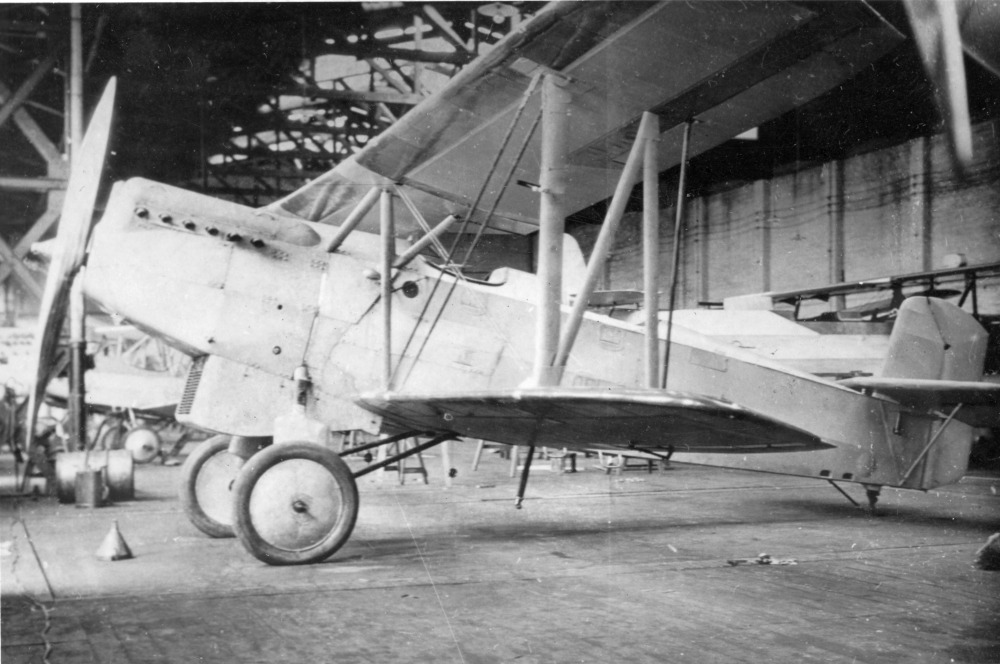
Albatros L 78 Nowarra

The Albatros L 78 was a two-seater biplane reconnaissance aircraft created in 1928. It was a revamp of the Albatros L 76 and armed with two 7.9 caliber machine guns with one being on the turret. Its engine was a BMW VI.

The L78 was tested at the German flight testing centre at Rechlin–Lärz Airfield in 1928. Six to seven L 78s were used by the German secret air force training school at Lipetsk, Russia from 1929 until the school was closed in 1933, with the survivors returning to Germany. At least four were wrecked in crashes while at Lipetsk. Eventually, it had two modifications: A reconnaissance bomber, and a transport aircraft with passenger windows and a door. In total, 14 of these aircraft were made.
