= Akaflieg München Mü18 Meßkrähe =

German single-seat glider, 1942

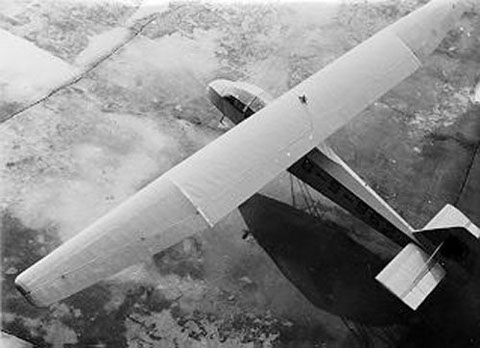

General information
- Type: Flying Wind Tunnel Glider
- National origin: Germany
- Manufacturer: Akaflieg München
- Number built: 1

History
- First flight: ca 1942

The Akaflieg München Mü18 Meßkrähe is a glider that was designed and built in Germany in 1927.

== Development ==
Initiated by the RLM (Reichsluftfahrministerium – Reich Aviation Ministry), the Mü18 "Meßkrähe" was an experimental flying wind-tunnel used to research aerofoil sections in undisturbed airflow. With the airframe designed and built at Akaflieg München, test aerofoil sections were provided by Akaflieg Chemnitz, Akaflieg Danzig and Akaflieg Göttingen. Test sections were suspended, in undisturbed airflow on an adjustable trapeze, for measurement of pressure distribution at various angles of attack. Progress on the glider was slow due to a very low priority for resources, but the Mü18 "Meßkrähe" eventually flew towards the end of World War II.
