= Akaflieg Stuttgart F.1 =

German single-seat glider, 1933

F-1 Fledermaus

General information
- Type: Research motor glider
- National origin: Germany
- Manufacturer: Akaflieg Stuttgart
- Number built: 1

History
- First flight: July 1933

The Akaflieg Stuttgart F-1 Fledermaus (Bat) was a glider designed and built in Germany from 1932.

== Development ==
The 'F.1' was the first glider designed and built at Akaflieg Stuttgart (Akademische Fliegergruppe) using a wind tunnel and innovative thinking. As built, the F.1 had no vertical tail, using rotatable wing-tip panels for roll and yaw control. The fuselage was curved to follow the downwash from the wing and rested solely on a single large skid under the forward fuselage, not having a tail-skid. The completely enclosed cockpit included a hanging control column, to simplify the control run, and airbrakes, for use on the ground, using the cockpit canopy. The F.1 entered its first competition at Rhön in 1933, but the technical committee insisted that the glider be given a conventional vertical tail, despite protests that the F.1 had already flown a 300 km distance task as built. The fliegergruppe acquiesced and built a vertical tail overnight, with the F.1 claiming several prizes during the competition.

== Specifications (F.1) ==
Data from Flugzeug-Typenbuch. Handbuch der deutschen Luftfahrt- und Zubehör-Industrie 1944

General characteristics

- Crew: 1
- Length: 5.53 m (18 ft 2 in)
- Wingspan: 16.6 m (54 ft 6 in)
- Height: 1.2 m (3 ft 11 in)
- Wing area: 15.44 m^{2} (166.2 sq ft)
- Length de-rigged: 8 m (26 ft)
- Width de-rigged (without tailplane): 14 m (46 ft)
- Height de-rigged: 1.4 m (4 ft 7 in)
- Aspect ratio: 19
- Airfoil: root: Göttingen 535; mid-span: Göttingen 535; tip: Göttingen 527
- Empty weight: 130 kg (287 lb)
- Gross weight: 210 kg (463 lb)

Performance

- g limits: +8.8 (ultimate)
- Maximum glide ratio: 22 at 56 km/h (35 mph; 30 kn)
- Rate of sink: 0.58 m/s (114 ft/min) at 48 km/h (30 mph; 26 kn)
- Wing loading: 13.6 kg/m^{2} (2.8 lb/sq ft)

== See also ==
Aircraft of comparable role, configuration, and era

- Rhönadler

Related lists

- List of gliders
