= Akaflieg München Mü5 Wastl =

German single-seat tailless glider, 1929

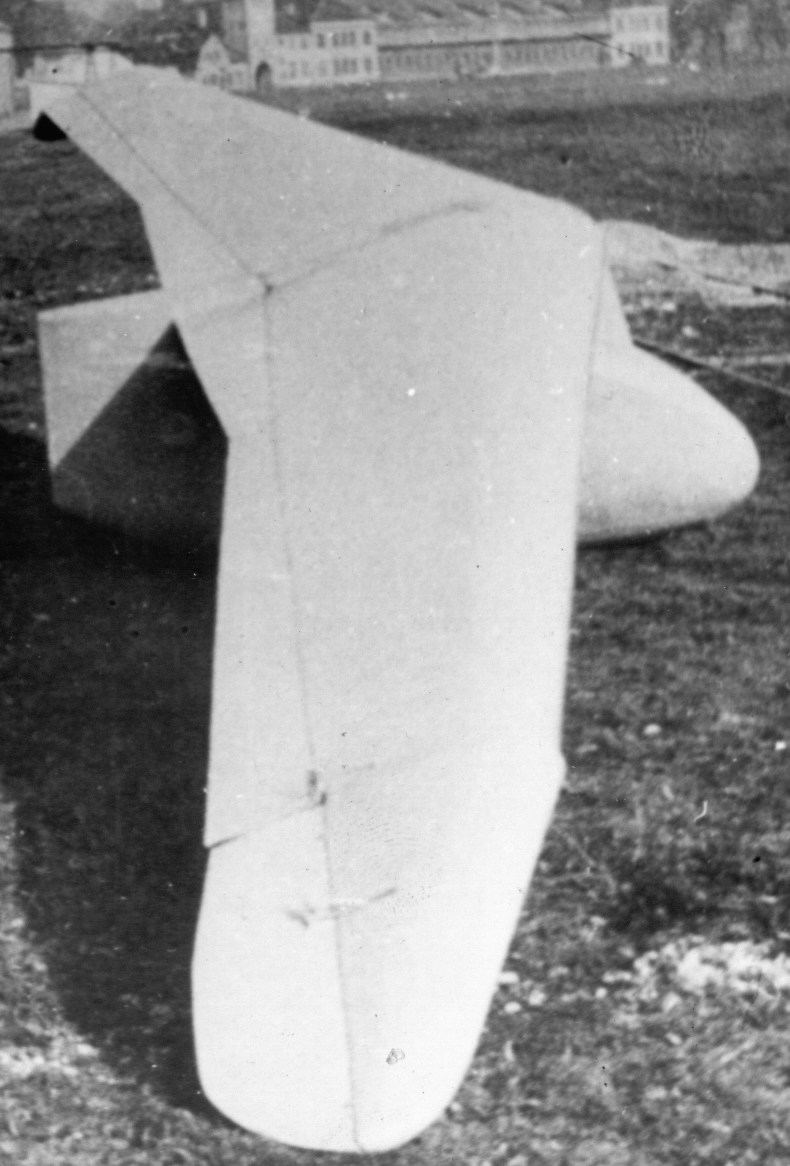

General information
- Type: Tailless glider
- National origin: Germany
- Manufacturer: Akaflieg München
- Number built: 1

History
- First flight: 1929

The Akaflieg München Mü5 Wastl is a glider that was designed and built in Germany in 1924.

== Development ==
Tailless aircraft have been the dream of many aircraft designers in their quest for reduced drag and greater aerodynamic efficiency, with the students and faculty at Akaflieg München equally fascinated by aircraft without tails. To research the performance and handling of tailless aircraft the students designed and built the Mü5 Wastl, consisting of a highly swept wing, mounted on a pylon above a streamlined fuselage pod, and wingtip panels mounted with marked anhedral.

Nicknamed “Fliegendes Ei” – “Flying Egg” the Mü5 Wastl was not very successful with a longest flight time of only 15s before the aircraft crashed due to the starboard wing dropping and contacting the ground, which had been a persistent problem in all flight attempts before the final hop.

Egon Scheibe, a notable glider designer of later years, who was one of the students at Akaflieg München at the time of the Mü5 Wastl, is quoted as saying “Unser einziger Trost war daß es anderen Leuten mit schwanzlosen Flugzeugen ähnlich erging.“ – (The only consolation is that other flying wings have had similar problems). Incidentally, the 'Flying Egg' name would be used later by Akaflieg Graz for their experimental G23 glider of 1941 that was designed around the same format.

== Variants ==
Akaflieg München Mü7
To investigate the properties of the Mü5 Wastl's wing and develop a sailplane for weak thermals, it was proposed by Egon Scheibe to fit a conventional fuselage to the Mü5 Wastl wing, but lack of time meant that hardware was not forthcoming.

== Specifications (Mü5 Wastl) ==
Data from Mü5 Wastl

General characteristics

- Crew: 1
- Length: 2.0 m (6 ft 6 in)
- Wingspan: 13.4 m (44 ft 0 in)
- Wing area: 11 m^{2} (118 sq ft)
- Aspect ratio: 16.4
- Empty weight: 140 kg (308.6 lb)
- Gross weight: 220 kg (485 lb)

Performance

== See also ==
Related lists

- List of gliders
