= Subaru 1000 =

The Subaru 1000 is a car produced by the Japanese company Fuji Heavy Industries from 1966 to 1969, and until 1972 as the FF-1 (also sold as the Subaru Star). It was the first front-engine, front-wheel drive Subaru, and also the first Subaru in the Japanese government "compact car" classification. Previous Subaru models such as the Subaru 360 and the Sambar had been rear-engined, rear-wheel drive kei cars.

It was the first production Subaru to use a boxer engine, and one of Japan's first front wheel drive cars.

== History ==
=== Prototype Subaru A-5 ===
In 1962, Subaru management decided to introduce a successor to the prototype Subaru 1500 with a code name A-5. The engine was technologically advanced for the time; the experimental EA51X was a Otto cycle, overhead camshaft, air-cooled, horizontally opposed four-cylinder engine displacing 980 cc driving the front wheels in a compact car platform. It was to have a double wishbone front suspension. Due to FHI's limited resources, the car was not produced. The Subaru 360 was selling only in Japan at the time but Subaru wanted a car that could comfortably carry four passengers without a cramped compartment, that was an alternative to rear wheel drive competitors Toyota Corolla, Nissan Sunny, Mazda Familia, Hino Contessa, Isuzu Bellett, and the Mitsubishi Colt 1000. Subaru also wanted to reduce engine noise by placing the engine at the front and improve interior space by implementing front wheel drive, thereby eliminating a centrally mounted drive shaft powering the rear wheels, and utilizing an independent suspension at all four wheels. Installing the air-cooled engine in the front took advantage of additional airflow into the engine compartment while the vehicle was in motion, while other air-cooled vehicles directed airflow into the rear engine compartment using externally installed air scoops to aid in cooling. To maximize space for front seat passengers, a bench seat was used and the transmission used a steering column attached gearlever. The only other Japanese company to use an air-cooled, horizontally opposed engine at the time was in the Toyota Publica with the Toyota U engine. Its appearance is similar to the Citroën Ami sharing an unusual reverse-raked notchback rear window, similar in style to the 1959 Ford Anglia 105E in Great Britain, and turn signal lamps installed next to the rear window as well as an air cooled flat 4 engine. Its dimensions were 3,985 mm (156.9 in) long, a wheelbase of 2,470 mm (97 in), a front wheel width of 1,260 mm (50 in) and a rear wheel width of 1,255 mm (49.4 in), with an overall width of 1,496 mm (58.9 in).

== Subaru 1000 (A12) ==
Subaru 1000
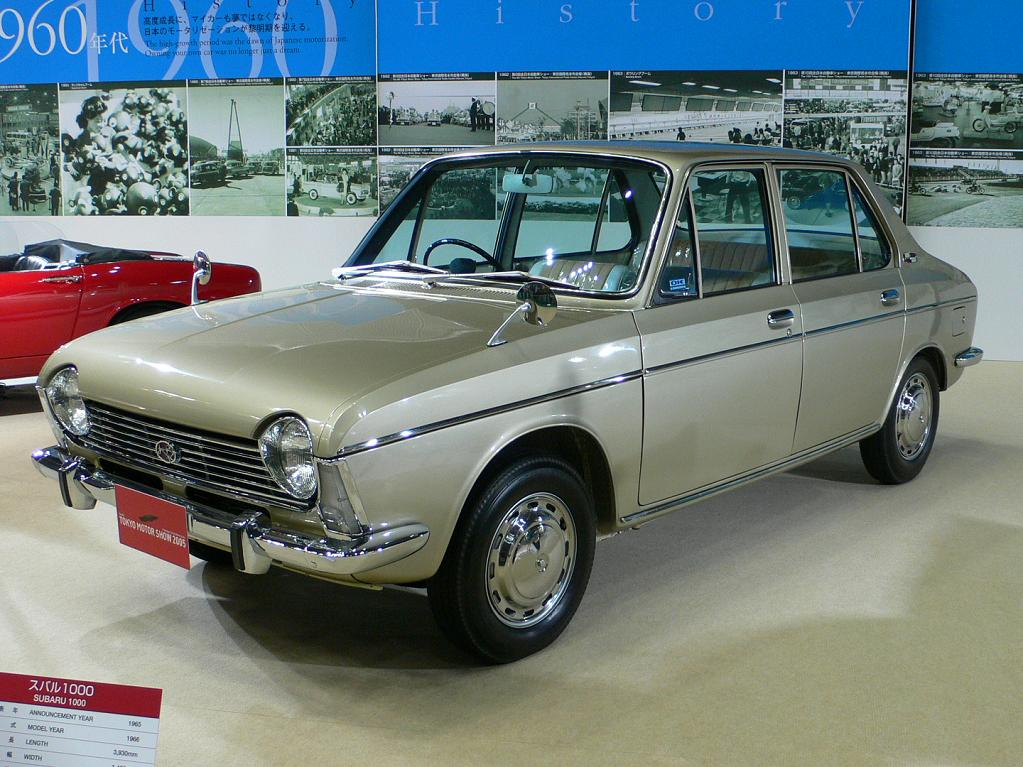
- Subaru 1000 sedan

Overview
- Manufacturer: Subaru (Fuji Heavy Industries)
- Model code: A12/A41, A512/522
- Production: 1966–1969
- Assembly: Japan: Yajima Plant, Ōta, Gunma
- Designer: Shinroku Momose

Body and chassis
- Body style: 2/4-door sedan 3/5-door van/station wagon
- Layout: Front-engine, front-wheel drive

Powertrain
- Engine: 977 cc EA52 F4

Dimensions
- Wheelbase: 2,420 mm (95.3 in)
- Length: 3,930 mm (154.7 in)
- Width: 1,480 mm (58.3 in)
- Height: 1,390 mm (54.7 in)
- Curb weight: 670–695 kg (1,477–1,532 lb)

In 1963, Subaru tried again, with a new project code A-4, with a smaller 923 cc engine, front wheel drive, and an overall length of 3,885 mm (153.0 in), a wheelbase of 2,400 mm (94.5 in), a front wheel width of 1,230 mm (48.4 in) and a rear wheel width of 1,220 mm (48 in), weighing 500 kg (1,102 lb). The model was assigned production code A-63 and underwent additional development; it was eventually introduced as the Subaru 1000. For compactness and to ensure quietness of operation with vibration kept to a minimum, the engine was developed with water cooling instead of the originally intended air cooling in the A-5 concept.

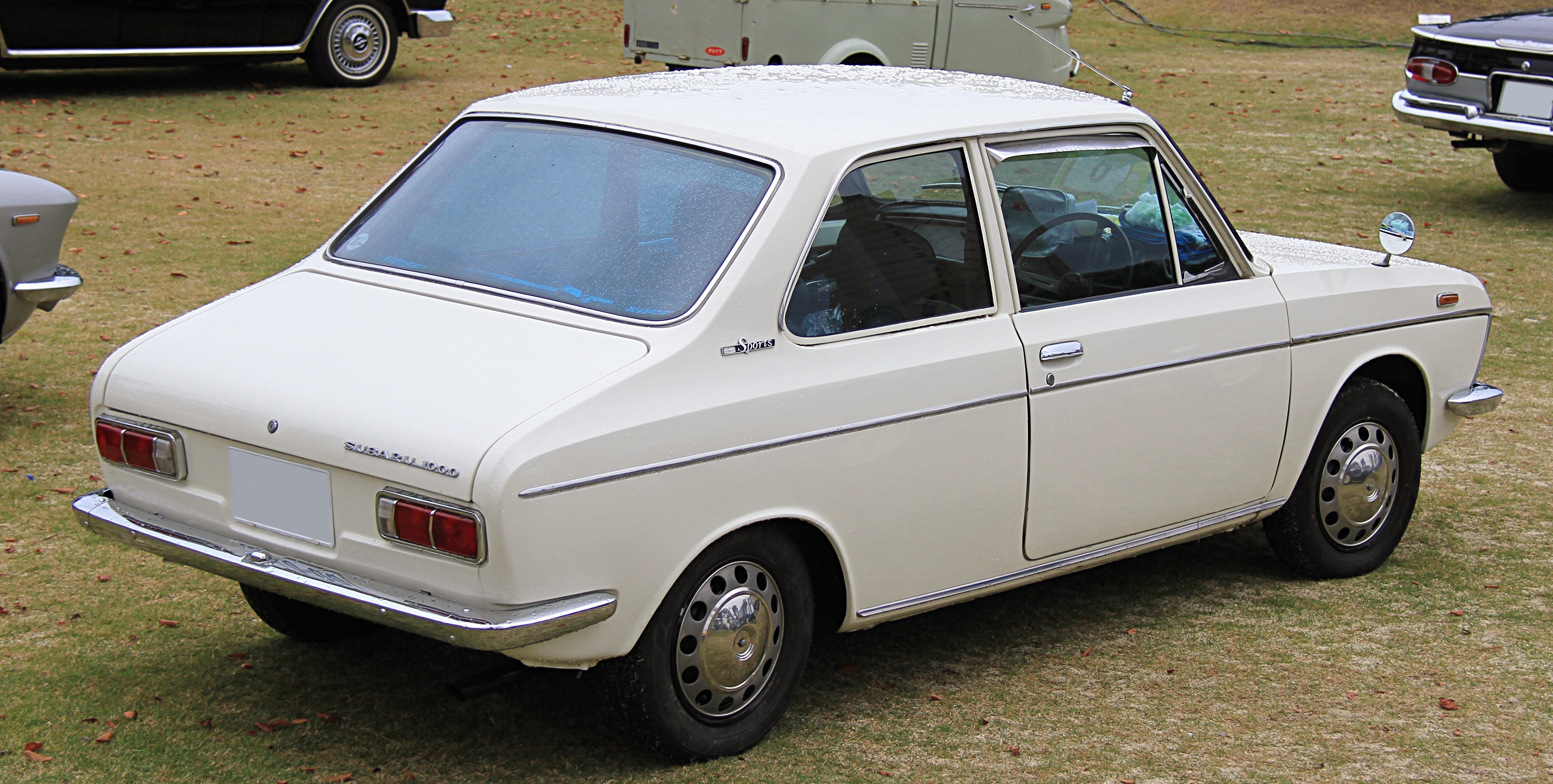
Subaru 1000 Sports Sedan (1968)

The Subaru 1000 was formally introduced on October 21, 1965, at the Hilton Hotel Tokyo, now known as the Hotel Tokyu Capitol. It was shown at the 12th Tokyo Motor Show Sunday October 29 later that year. It was available for purchase May 14, 1966 with a national release in Japan in October 1966. Its initial model code was A522.

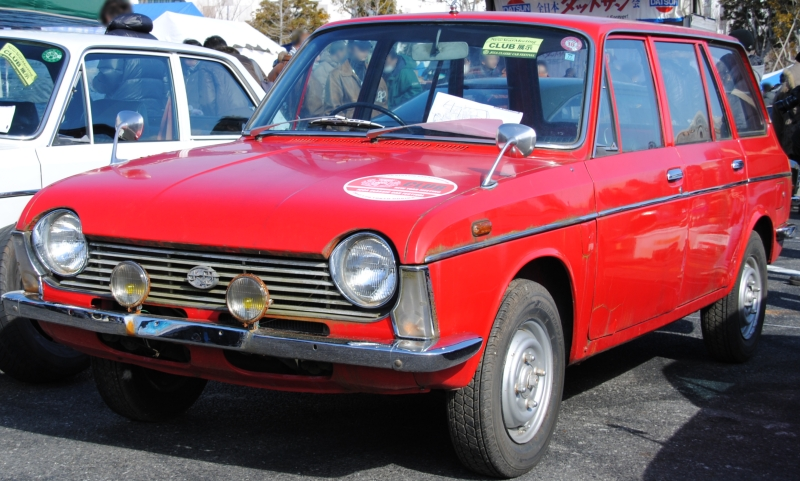
Subaru 1000 Light Van Deluxe 5-door (wagon; A41)

These cars featured a unique water-cooled, horizontally opposed four-cylinder engine, with overhead valves operated by pushrods. Subaru engineers examined designs by Porsche, Renault, DKW and the Chevrolet Corvair, and concluded that it would be desirable to combine this type of engine with a front-wheel drive system. The main problem in achieving this combination was the vibrations from universal joints, but in collaboration with the bearing maker Toyo Bearing (now known as NTN), the innovative "double offset joint" was devised. Modern Subarus still make use of horizontally opposed four-cylinder engines, albeit of a much larger capacity and with more modern overhead-cam-driven valves.

As was not uncommon for early front-wheel drive cars, the 1000 featured inboard drum brakes up front to reduce unsprung suspension weight and an easier implementation of an independent front suspension (but atypically Subaru would retain this unusual design into the seventies). Other unique features of the 1000 were a lack of a heater core; the heating system took its warmth directly from the radiator, and a hybrid suspension system that used torsion bars in combination with coil springs (much like the front suspension of the Subaru 360).

=== Development ===
In addition to the 55 PS (40 kW) model there was also a more powerful "1000 SS" model available for 1968, first shown at the 1967 Tokyo Motor Show. This offered 67 PS (49 kW) at 6600 rpm; the top speed increased from 135 to 150 km/h (84 to 93 mph). The power increase was due to twin SU carburettors and a 10:1 compression ratio, while stopping and going was improved with the fitment of quicker steering, disc brakes in front, firmer suspension, and standard radial tires.

The first change was the addition of optional three-point seat belts in October 1966. The two-door sedan, model code A512, was introduced February 15, 1967. The range received minor modifications in June 1967, at which time the model codes were unified, becoming the A12. An additional bodystyle, a five-door light van (A41), was released on September 14, 1967. In reality, this is a station wagon with a folding rear seat to take advantage of Japanese tax loopholes. It was only available with the regular, lower powered engine, with either Standard or Deluxe equipment. The Deluxe can be recognized by a chrome strip along the side of the car and by its full, chromed hubcaps. Two months later came the "Sports Sedan", only with the two-door sedan body and the higher powered EA-53 engine. In January 1968, a three-door light van was added (also as a Standard or Deluxe), completing the lineup. At the same time, the Sports' floor-mounted shifter became available to the Deluxe sedans. A dual hydraulic brake system was made standard on the Sports Sedan". The last addition to the lineup took place in November 1968 (with only four months' production left), when the Super Deluxe model was added. This was available as a two- or four-door sedan and had a standard floor shift.

By March 1969, monthly production of Subaru's alternative to the Toyota Corolla and the Nissan Sunny was up to over 4,000 units. The 1000 was superseded by the 1100 (also known as the Subaru FF-1 Star in the United States and in other export markets) in March 1969.

=== Mechanical ===
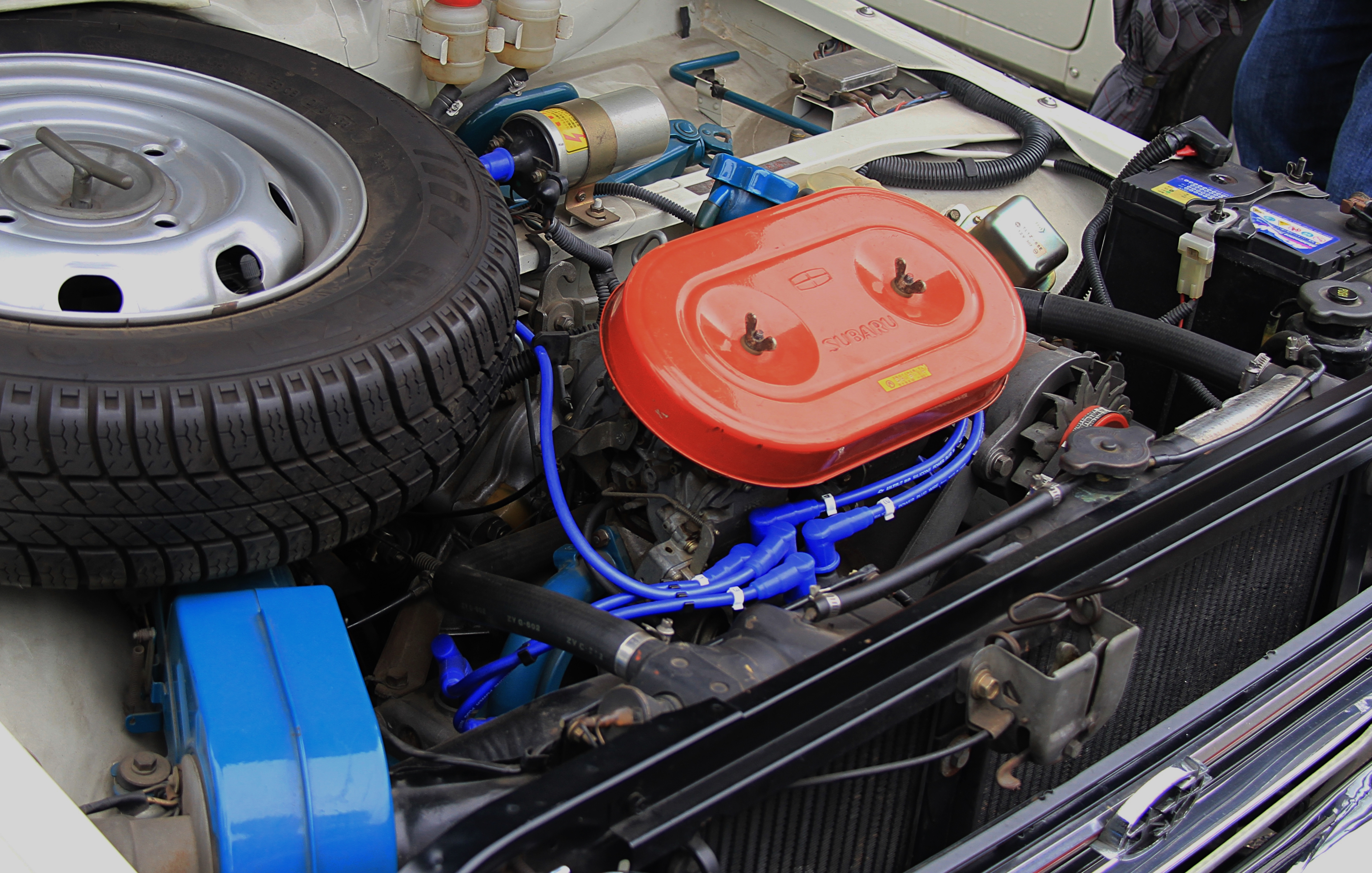
Subaru EA53 engine (1000 Sports)

Subaru EA-52 Engine 1.0-liter OHV water-cooled flat-four

- Displacement: 72 mm × 60 mm (2.8 in × 2.4 in), 977 cc
- Power: 55 PS (40 kW; 54 hp) at 6,000 rpm, 7.8 kg⋅m (76 N⋅m; 56 lb⋅ft) at 3,200 rpm with 9:1 compression ratio and two-barrel carburetor

Subaru EA-53 Engine 1.0-liter OHV water-cooled flat-four (1000 Sports)

- Displacement: 72 mm × 60 mm (2.8 in × 2.4 in), 977 cc
- Power: 67 PS (49 kW; 66 hp) at 6,600 rpm, 8.2 kg⋅m (80 N⋅m; 59 lb⋅ft) at 4,600 rpm with 10:1 compression ratio and two-barrel carburetor

Transmission

Four-speed manual, front-wheel drive

- Gear ratios: 1st 4.000 2nd 2.235 3rd 1.543 4th 1.033, Rev 4.100 Final 4.125

== FF-1 (1969–1972) ==
Subaru FF-1
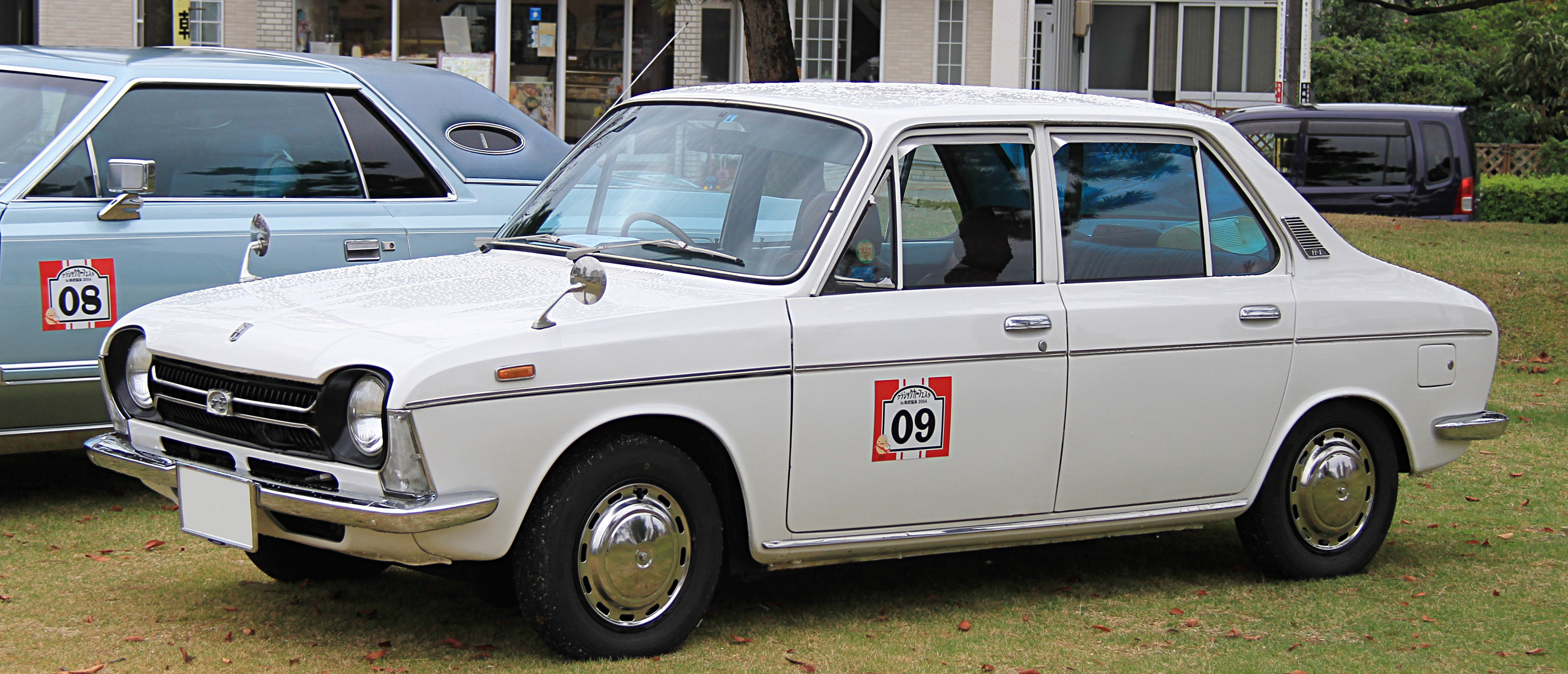
- 1971 Subaru FF-1 1100 four-door sedan

Overview
- Model code: A14/A15; A43/A44 (Van)
- Also called: Subaru Star
- Production: 1969–1972

Body and chassis
- Body style: 2/4-door sedan 3/5-door van/wagon
- Layout: Front-engine, front-wheel drive; Front-engine, four-wheel drive

Powertrain
- Engine: 1088 cc EA61 F4; 1268 cc EA62 F4
- Transmission: 4-speed T71 manual

Dimensions
- Wheelbase: 2,420 mm (95.3 in)
- Length: 3,930 mm (154.7 in)
- Width: 1,480 mm (58.3 in)
- Height: 1,390 mm (54.7 in)
- Curb weight: 700–755 kg (1,543–1,664 lb)

Chronology
- Successor: Subaru Leone

The Subaru FF-1 (A14), known also as the FF-1 Star, was a development of the original front-wheel drive Subaru, the 1000. The larger-engined and facelifted FF-1 was introduced in Japan March 1, 1969, and was marketed as the Star in the United States in 1970 and 1971 model years. For 1972 (and part of 1973), it was sold as the FF-1 1100 in the US. It was joined by the 1.3-liter FF-1 1300 G in 1971. Two- or four-door sedans and a five-door station wagon models were available. This model only came with the EA-61 engine and four-speed manual transmission. The FF-1 can be distinguished from the 1000 by minor trim modifications to include the front grille and interior appearance. This platform of sedans and wagons was discontinued by Subaru on September 1 1972, with sales continuing into 1973, alongside the new Leone.

From October 1969, there was also a short-lived FF-1 Sports, with a high output version of the EA61 engine. While the regular FF-1 1100 continued to be built, the Sports was replaced by the 1300-engined version in 1970. When fitted to the four-door sedan, this version was called the Super Touring. The regular range started with the Deluxe and continued with the Custom (both with column shift) and the GL (with a floor shifter). In Japan, the wagon models were technically speaking commercial vehicles - sold as vans, with either three or five doors and typically less equipment than the sedan versions. The vans carried the A43 model code and were available with either Standard or Deluxe equipment.

The entire FF-1 range received a minor facelift in April 1971, in which the taillights were redesigned, as were the sheetmetal of the hood and trunk lid, which now had a small lip. The 1000/FF-1, being Subaru's first "real" car, was released before the design was fully completed, leading to numerous ongoing changes during production, in response to input from dealers and owners. In total, 83,696 FF-1s were built from 1969 until 1972.

=== FF-1 1300G (1970–1972) ===
The Subaru FF-1 1300G (A15) was a larger-engined variant of the FF-1 introduced in Japan July 10, 1970. It received the larger, 1.3-litre Subaru EA62 flat-four engine. The car carried over the 1100's independent torsion bar suspension and rack and pinion steering, inboard front drum brakes and dual radiators. The T71 four-speed manual transmission was also carried over. For the sporting models (Sports and Super Touring), a quicker steering rack was fitted. Even in 1972, Subaru boasted about the foul-weather handling of their cars, and they were quite successful. Achieving 29 miles per US gallon (8.1 L/100 km; 35 mpg_{‑imp}), the Subaru quickly became a strong-selling import car in the United States. From the outside, the FF-1 G can be recognized by its redesigned grille with a large "G" beneath the Subaru logo. The 1300G was also available as a Van in Japan (A44), but only with five doors and Deluxe equipment. A floor shifter was an available option on this model.

The 1.3-liter EA62 engine had no cooling fan, only an electric fan on the small radiator cooled the engine. The car had a dual radiator system, which made for quieter operation and allowed it to reach operating temperature quicker. The engine used only a small radiator (which was also the heater core) on starting, with the main radiator being connected by a thermostat once the engine heated up. The 1.3 engine was unique to this model and the only Subaru engine to have rear-facing exhaust ports. In the United States, most 1972–1973 models were equipped with the 1.3-liter EA62 engine. The high compression, high output EA62S engine received dual exhaust pipes, two twin-barrel Hitachi carburetors, special camshafts, and adjustments to the valve timing and lift. For 1971 the engine also received an idle limiter and a fuel vapor control system, to lower emissions. The EA62S was fitted to the Sports and Super Touring versions; the Sports was discontinued in October 1971 (when the Leone coupé was introduced) and the engine was discontinued after the Super Touring was also removed from the price lists in April 1972.

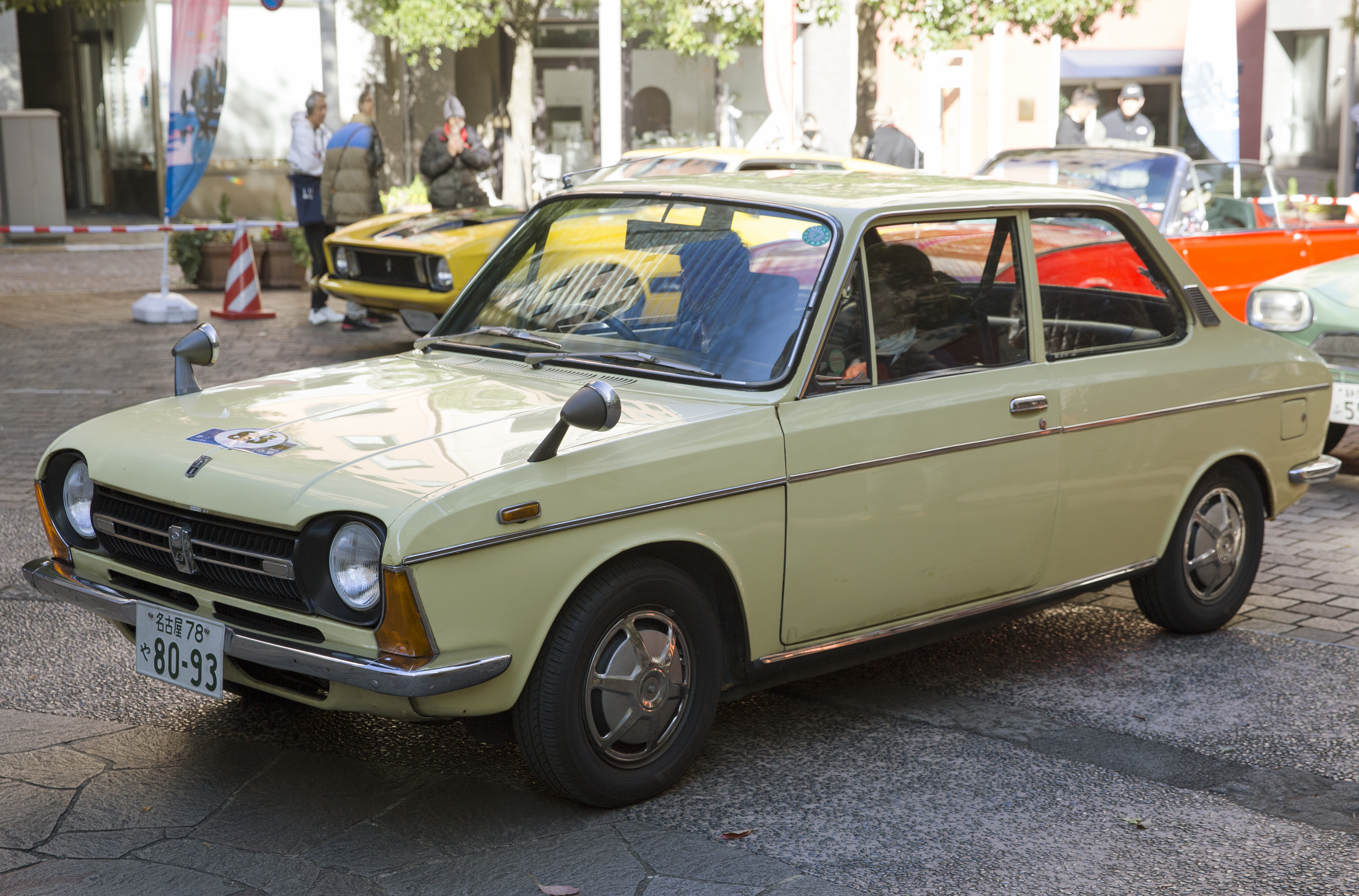
1970 Subaru FF-1 1300 G Sports (two-door sedan)

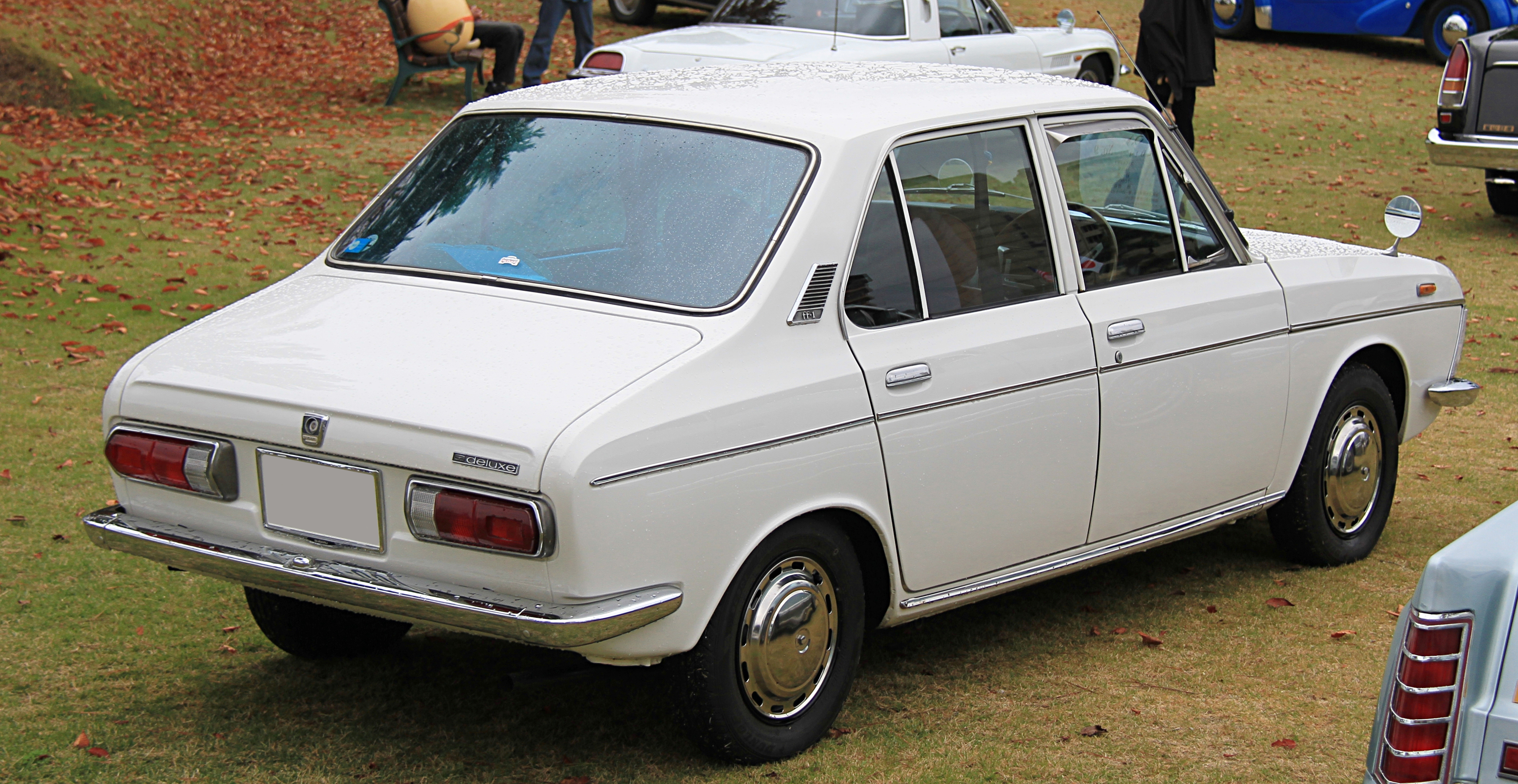
1971 facelift model (FF-1 1100 Deluxe Sedan)

=== Mechanical ===
Subaru EA61, 1.1-liter OHV water-cooled flat-4

- Displacement: 76 mm x 60 mm, 1088 cc
- Power: 62 PS (46 kW) JIS Gross at 6,000 rpm, 8.7 kg⋅m (85 N⋅m; 63 lb⋅ft) at 3,200 rpm with 9:1 compression and two-barrel carburetor

US specifications:

- Power: 60 hp (45 kW; 61 PS) at 6000 rpm, 65 lb⋅ft (88 N⋅m) at 4000 rpm with 9:1 compression ratio and two-barrel carburetor

EA62 1.3L OHV water-cooled flat-4

- Displacement: 82 mm x 60 mm, 1268 cc
- Power: 80 PS (59 kW) JIS Gross at 6,400 rpm, 10.1 kg⋅m (99 N⋅m; 73 lb⋅ft) at 4,000 rpm with 9:1 compression and dual two-barrel carburetors
- Sports/Super Touring: EA62S, 93 PS (68 kW) JIS Gross at 7,000 rpm, 10.5 kg⋅m (103 N⋅m; 76 lb⋅ft) at 5,000 rpm with 10:1 compression and dual two-barrel Zenith Stromberg carburetors

Transmission

Four-speed manual. Gear ratios: 1st 3.540 (4.000 wagon), 2nd 2.235, 3rd 1.543, 4th 1.033, Rev 4.100, Final 4.125

=== 4WD Wagon ===
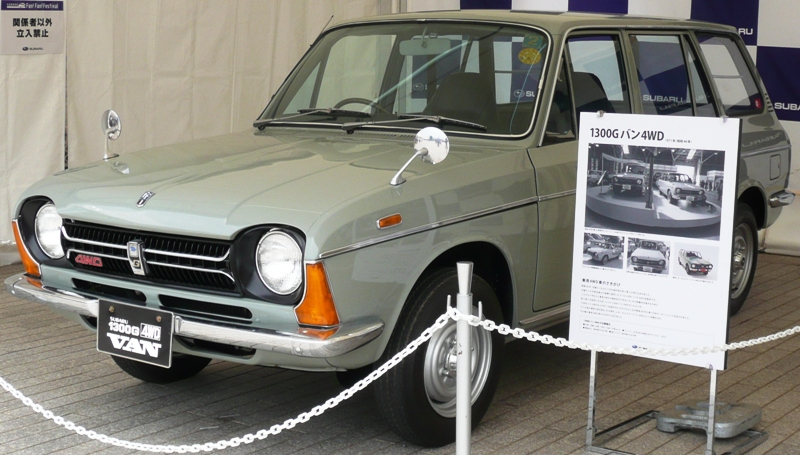
Subaru FF-1 G 4WD Wagon

In 1970, a Japanese Subaru dealership received a special order request from the Tohoku Electric Power Company for Subaru to build an all-weather vehicle with 4WD, as the company was currently using jeeps that were open to the weather. The jeeps could not seal out the cold weather, and did not have adequate heaters for winter use. The 4WD traction was advantageous in traveling on poor roads, but the jeeps were of a 30-year-old design and something more modern was desired. A car with 4WD would be more comfortable. Tohoku Electric asked that the Subaru 1000 station wagon be converted from front-wheel drive to 4WD. Given the design of the drivetrain being used in Subarus of the time, it was considered relatively easy to simply attach a driveshaft to the back of the transmission and add a rear differential that powered the rear wheels. A transfer case was also installed so that the 4WD system could be disengaged with an additional gearshift lever installed next to the transmission gearshift.

In March 1971, two prototypes were used in testing a 4WD system using the station-wagon body style, borrowing a rear differential from a 510-series Nissan Bluebird. The tests were successful. On October 29, 1971, the Subaru 1300G was displayed next to a station wagon installed with 4WD, parked on top of a mirror so that visitors to the 18th Tokyo Motor Show could see the new drivetrain system. The station wagon also had a 20 mm (0.79 in) increased ground clearance over the standard model displayed. Subaru manufactured eight wagons with the 4WD installed, of which Tohoku Electric purchased five and the remaining three were delivered to the Village of Hakuba for government use in Nagano Prefecture in agricultural applications.

In 2008, Subaru located one of the original eight wagons. The vehicle was restored to its original condition and is displayed at various events in Japan.
