= Amax Double Eagle TT =

Double Eagle TT

General information
- Type: Autogyro
- National origin: Australia
- Manufacturer: Amax Engineering
- Status: Production completed

The Amax Double Eagle TT is an Australian autogyro that was designed and produced by Amax Engineering of Donvale, Victoria in the late 1990s. Now out of production, when it was available the aircraft was supplied as a kit for amateur construction.

The "TT" designation indicates "Tall Tail". The aircraft has higher landing gear, allowing the engine to be placed on the vertical center of gravity, which eliminates pitch changes with throttle application.

== Design and development ==
The Double Eagle TT was designed to comply with amateur-built aircraft rules. It features a single main rotor, a two-seats-in tandem open cockpit without a windshield, tricycle landing gear with wheel pants and a four-cylinder, liquid-cooled, four-stroke, single-ignition 150 hp (112 kW) Subaru EA82 automotive engine in pusher configuration.

The aircraft fuselage is made from welded 4130 steel tubing, with some aluminum parts. Its two-bladed rotor has a diameter of 30.00 ft (9.1 m). The aircraft has a typical empty weight of 575 lb (261 kg) and a gross weight of 1,150 lb (520 kg), giving a useful load of 575 lb (261 kg). With full fuel of 12 U.S. gallons (45 L; 10.0 imp gal) the payload for the pilot, passengers and baggage is 503 lb (228 kg).

The standard day, sea level, no wind, take off with a 150 hp (112 kW) engine is 200 ft (61 m) and the landing roll is 10 ft (3 m).

The manufacturer estimates the construction time from the supplied kit as 100 hours.

== Specifications (Double Eagle TT) ==
Data from Purdy

General characteristics

- Crew: one
- Capacity: one passenger
- Length: 13 ft 0 in (3.96 m)
- Empty weight: 575 lb (261 kg)
- Gross weight: 1,150 lb (522 kg)
- Fuel capacity: 12 U.S. gallons (45 L; 10.0 imp gal)
- Powerplant: 1 × Subaru EA82 four cylinder, liquid-cooled, four stroke automotive engine, 150 hp (110 kW)
- Main rotor diameter: 31 ft 0 in (9.45 m)
- Main rotor area: 754 sq ft (70.0 m^{2})
- Propellers: 3-bladed ground adjustable, composite

Performance

- Maximum speed: 100 mph (160 km/h, 87 kn)
- Cruise speed: 70 mph (110 km/h, 61 kn)
- Range: 300 mi (480 km, 260 nmi)
- Service ceiling: 14,000 ft (4,300 m)
- Rate of climb: 1,000 ft/min (5.1 m/s)
- Disk loading: 1.5 lb/sq ft (7.3 kg/m^{2})

== See also ==
- List of rotorcraft
