= Amax Eagle =

Eagle

General information
- Type: Autogyro
- National origin: Australia
- Manufacturer: Amax Engineering
- Status: Production completed

History
- Variant: Amax Eagle TT

The Amax Eagle is an Australian autogyro that was designed and produced by Amax Engineering of Donvale, Victoria, introduced in the early 1990s. Now out of production, when it was available the aircraft was supplied as a kit for amateur construction.

== Design and development ==
The Eagle was designed to comply with amateur-built aircraft rules. It features a single main rotor, a single-seat open cockpit without a windshield, tricycle landing gear without wheel pants and a four-cylinder, liquid-cooled, four-stroke, single-ignition 110 hp (82 kW) Subaru EA81 automotive engine in pusher configuration.

The aircraft fuselage is made from welded 4130 steel tubing with some aluminum parts. Its two-bladed rotor has a diameter of 26.00 ft (7.9 m). The aircraft has a typical empty weight of 410 lb (190 kg) and a gross weight of 850 lb (390 kg), giving a useful load of 440 lb (200 kg). With full fuel of 12 U.S. gallons (45 L; 10.0 imp gal) the payload for the pilot and baggage is 368 lb (167 kg).

The standard day, sea level, no wind, take off with a 110 hp (82 kW) engine is 100 ft (30 m) and the landing roll is 10 ft (3 m).

The manufacturer estimated the construction time from the supplied kit as 100 hours.

The Eagle was later developed into the Eagle TT ("Tall Tail"). The Eagle TT has higher landing gear allowing the engine to be placed on the vertical center of gravity which eliminates pitch changes with throttle application.

== Operational history ==
The Eagle won Most Outstanding Design at the 1992 Popular Rotorcraft Association annual convention in Brookville, Ohio, United States.

The design is widely employed in Australia for cattle mustering.

== Specifications (Eagle) ==
Data from Purdy

General characteristics

- Crew: one
- Length: 10 ft 0 in (3.05 m)
- Empty weight: 410 lb (186 kg)
- Gross weight: 850 lb (386 kg)
- Fuel capacity: 12 U.S. gallons (45 L; 10.0 imp gal)
- Powerplant: 1 × Subaru EA81 four cylinder, liquid-cooled, four stroke automotive engine, 110 hp (82 kW)
- Main rotor diameter: 26 ft 0 in (7.92 m)
- Main rotor area: 531 sq ft (49.3 m^{2})
- Propellers: 3-bladed ground adjustable, composite

Performance

- Maximum speed: 90 mph (140 km/h, 78 kn)
- Cruise speed: 70 mph (110 km/h, 61 kn)
- Range: 300 mi (480 km, 260 nmi)
- Service ceiling: 14,000 ft (4,300 m)
- Rate of climb: 1,500 ft/min (7.6 m/s)
- Disk loading: 1.6 lb/sq ft (7.8 kg/m^{2})

== See also ==
- List of rotorcraft
