= Amax Vixen 105 =

Australian homebuilt aircraft

Vixen 105

General information
- Type: Homebuilt aircraft
- National origin: Australia
- Manufacturer: Amax Engineering
- Status: Production completed
- Number built: At least one

The Amax Vixen 105 is an Australian homebuilt aircraft that was designed and produced by Amax Engineering of Donvale, Victoria. When it was available the aircraft was supplied as a kit for amateur construction.

== Design and development ==
The Vixen 105 features a strut-braced high-wing, a two-seats-in-side-by-side configuration enclosed cabin with doors, fixed tricycle landing gear or optionally conventional landing gear and a single engine in tractor configuration.

The aircraft is made from composites. Its 28.50 ft (8.7 m) span wing has optional flaps and a wing area of 128.00 sq ft (11.892 m^{2}). The standard engine used is the 105 hp (78 kW) Subaru EA81 automotive conversion powerplant.

Optional equipment when the kit was supplied by the factory included wing flaps, long range fuel tanks, wheel pants and sprung steel main landing gear.

The Vixen 105 has an empty weight of 500 lb (230 kg) and a gross weight of 1,200 lb (540 kg), giving a useful load of 700 lb (320 kg). With full fuel of 16 U.S. gallons (61 L; 13 imp gal) the payload is 604 lb (274 kg).

The manufacturer estimates the construction time from the supplied kit as 300 hours.

== Specifications (Vixen 105) ==
Data from AeroCrafter

General characteristics

- Crew: one
- Capacity: one passenger
- Length: 18.7 ft (5.7 m)
- Wingspan: 28 ft 6 in (8.69 m)
- Wing area: 128.00 sq ft (11.892 m^{2})
- Empty weight: 500 lb (227 kg)
- Gross weight: 1,200 lb (544 kg)
- Fuel capacity: 16 U.S. gallons (61 L; 13 imp gal)
- Powerplant: 1 × Subaru EA81 four cylinder, air-cooled, four stroke automotive engine, 105 hp (78 kW)
- Propellers: 3-bladed composite

Performance

- Maximum speed: 130 mph (210 km/h, 110 kn)
- Cruise speed: 100 mph (160 km/h, 87 kn)
- Stall speed: 40 mph (64 km/h, 35 kn)
- Range: 350 mi (560 km, 300 nmi)
- Service ceiling: 14,000 ft (4,300 m)
- Rate of climb: 900 ft/min (4.6 m/s)
- Wing loading: 9.4 lb/sq ft (46 kg/m^{2})
