= Amax Sport 1700 =

Australian homebuilt aircraft

Sport 1700

General information
- Type: Homebuilt aircraft
- National origin: Australia
- Manufacturer: Amax Engineering
- Status: Production completed
- Number built: at least one

The Amax Sport 1700 is an Australian homebuilt aircraft that was designed and produced by Amax Engineering of Donvale, Victoria. When it was available the aircraft was supplied as a kit or in the form of plans for amateur construction.

== Design and development ==
The Sport 1700 features a strut-braced parasol wing, a two-seats-in-tandem open cockpit with a windshield, fixed conventional landing gear and a single engine in tractor configuration.

The aircraft fuselage is made from welded 4130 steel tubing, while the wing is of wooden construction, with the whole aircraft covered in doped aircraft fabric. Its 33.00 ft (10.1 m) span wing has a wing area of 146.00 sq ft (13.564 m^{2}) and are capable of folding for storage for ground transport. The acceptable power range is 85 to 110 hp (63 to 82 kW).

The Sport 1700 has an empty weight of 600 lb (270 kg) and a gross weight of 1,300 lb (590 kg), giving a useful load of 700 lb (320 kg). With full fuel of 16 U.S. gallons (61 L; 13 imp gal) the payload is 604 lb (274 kg).

The manufacturer estimates the construction time from the supplied kit as 500 hours.

== Specifications (Sport 1700) ==
Data from AeroCrafter

General characteristics

- Crew: one
- Capacity: one passenger
- Length: 20 ft 0 in (6.10 m)
- Wingspan: 33 ft 0 in (10.06 m)
- Empty weight: 600 lb (272 kg)
- Gross weight: 1,300 lb (590 kg)
- Fuel capacity: 16 U.S. gallons (61 L; 13 imp gal)
- Powerplant: 1 × air-cooled, four stroke aircraft engine , 110 hp (82 kW)
- Propellers: 2-bladed wooden

Performance

- Maximum speed: 115 mph (185 km/h, 100 kn)
- Cruise speed: 85 mph (137 km/h, 74 kn)
- Stall speed: 35 mph (56 km/h, 30 kn)
- Range: 340 mi (550 km, 300 nmi)
- Service ceiling: 14,000 ft (4,300 m)
- Rate of climb: 900 ft/min (4.6 m/s)
- Wing loading: 8.9 lb/sq ft (43 kg/m^{2})
