= Amax Engineering =

Australian aircraft manufacturer

- Company type: Privately held company
- Industry: Aerospace
- Founded: 1980s
- Defunct: after 1998
- Fate: Out of business
- Headquarters: Donvale, Victoria, Australia
- Products: Kit aircraft

Amax Engineering was an Australian aircraft manufacturer based in Donvale, Victoria, a suburb of Melbourne. When it was in business, the company specialized in the design and manufacture of kit aircraft for amateur construction. The company designed and supplied kits and plans for both fixed-wing aircraft and autogyros.

== Aircraft ==
Summary of aircraft built by Amax Engineering
Model name	First flight	Number built	Type
Amax Double Eagle TT			Two seat autogyro
Amax Eagle			Single seat autogyro
Amax Eagle TT			Single seat autogyro
Amax J6 Karatoo			Two seat ultralight and light-sport aircraft, designed by Jesse Anglin
Amax Sport 1700			Two seat ultralight aircraft
Amax Vixen 105			Two-seats-in-side-by-side configuration ultralight aircraft
