= Subaru 360 =

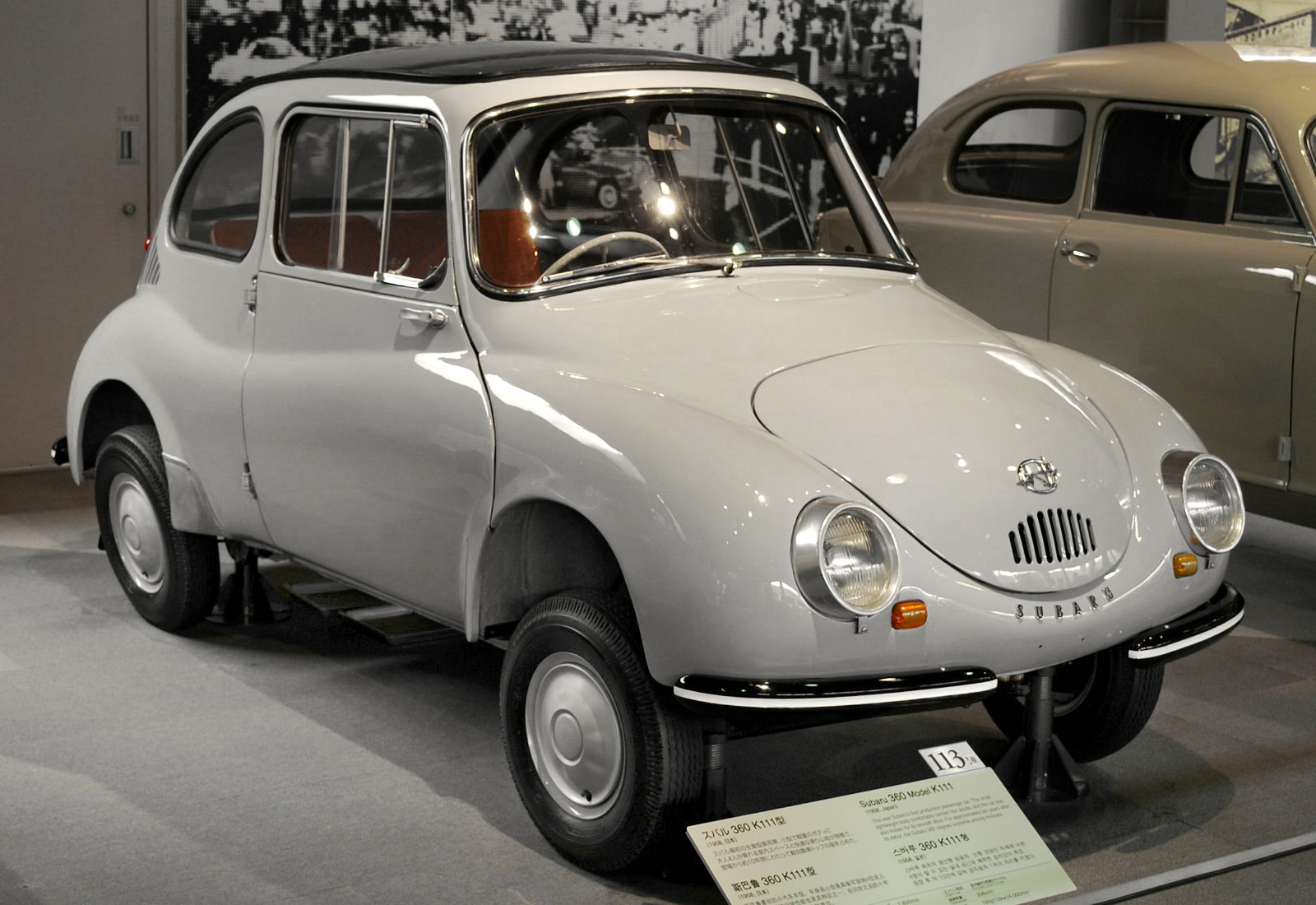

Overview
- Manufacturer: Subaru
- Also called: Subaru 450; K-10 (prototype); Subaru Maia
- Production: 1958–1971
- Assembly: Japan: Otakita Plant, Ōta, Gunma
- Designer: Shinroku Momose

Body and chassis
- Class: Microcar
- Body style: 2-door sedan; 2-door cabrio coach; 3-door station wagon
- Layout: Rear-engine, rear-wheel-drive
- Doors: Suicide doors
- Related: Subaru Sambar

Powertrain
- Engine: 356 cc EK31 I2; 356 cc EK32 I2; 423 cc EK51 I2

Dimensions
- Wheelbase: 1,801 mm (70.9 in)
- Length: 2,990 mm (117.7 in)
- Width: 1,300 mm (51.2 in)
- Height: 1,379 mm (54.3 in)
- Curb weight: 410 kg (900 lb)

Chronology
- Successor: Subaru R-2

The Subaru 360 is a rear-engined, two-door city car manufactured and marketed by Subaru from 1958 to 1971. As the company's first mass-produced automobile, production reached 392,000 over its 12-year model run.

Noted for its small overall size, 450 kg (1,000 lb) curb weight, monocoque construction, swing axle rear suspension, fiberglass roof panel, and rear-hinged doors, the inexpensive car was designed in response to the Japanese government's light car or Kei car regulations and its proposal for a larger "national car," both intended to help motorize the post WWII Japanese population. The 360's overall size and engine capacity complied with Japan's Kei car regulations.

Nicknamed the "ladybug" in Japan, and ultimately superseded by R-2, the 360 was one of Japan's most popular cars and was available in a single generation in two-door, station wagon ("Custom"), "convertible" (a sedan with a roll-back fabric roof) and sporting variants. The two-door sedans' model code is K111, while the wagon is known as K142. Ten thousand were sold in the United States, imported by Malcolm Bricklin and advertised as "Cheap and Ugly."

The nameplate 360 derived from its tax-limited engine displacement: 356 cc.

== Development ==
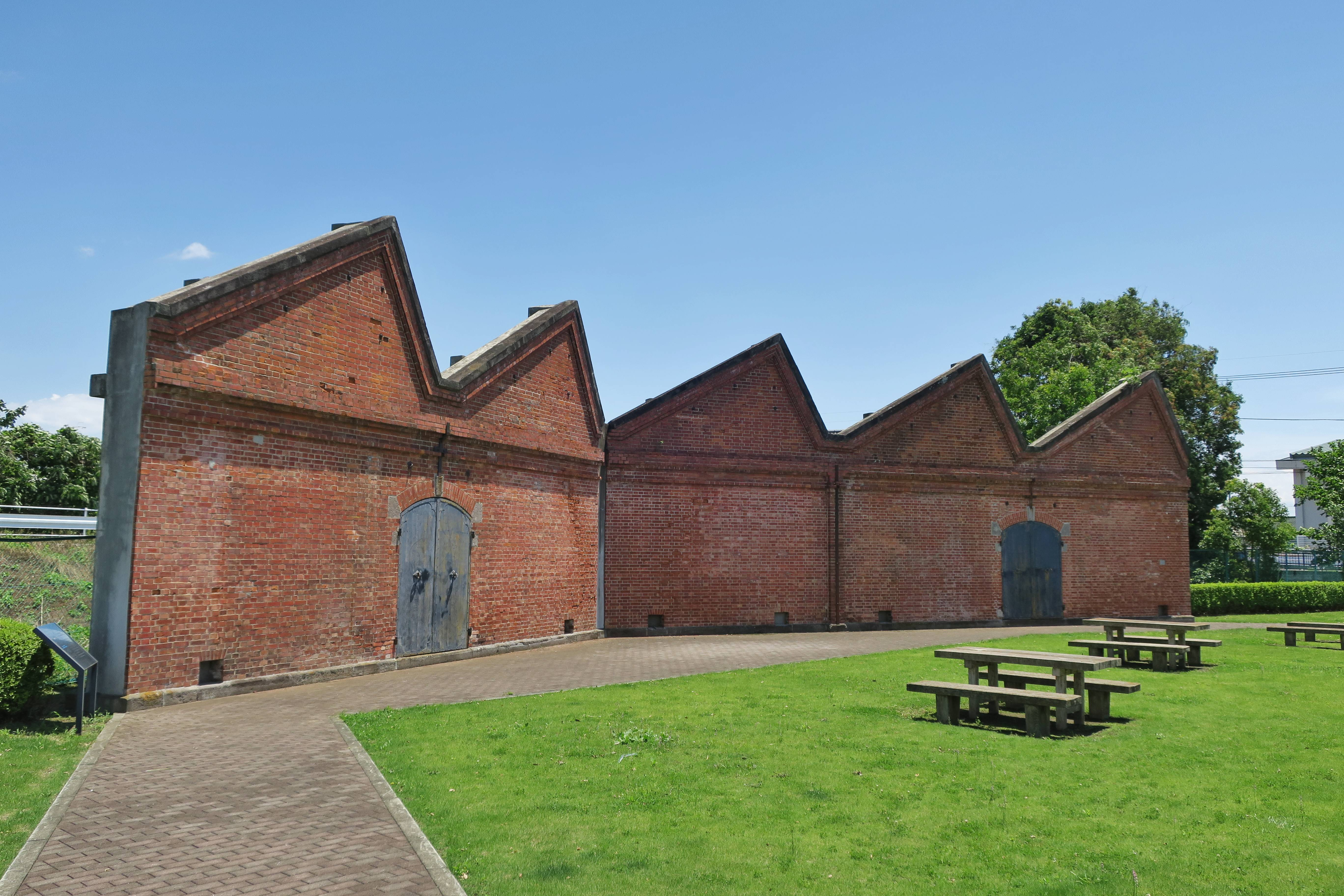
The remains of the Isesaki Plant no. 2 which was the "birthplace" of 360

Prior to the development of the Subaru 360, Fuji Auto Works had been working on the development of a regular passenger car since 1952, and had even managed to create a prototype of the "Subaru 1500," an advanced 1500cc four-door sedan with a monocoque structure. In February 1954, the prototype of the P-1 was completed. Nearly 20 units were made. However, due to concerns about profitability and market competitiveness, the plan to commercialize it was abandoned in 1955 and development was stalled.

In September 1954 , the "New Road Traffic Control Act" was enacted, and while the dimensions of overall length x overall width x overall height (mm) remained the same (3,000 x 1,300 x 2,000), the displacement of both 2-stroke and 4-stroke engines was standardized to 360 cc.

In December 1955, Fuji Heavy Industries decided to abandon the Subaru 1500. However, on the same day, they also decided to repurpose the production line for 250cc scooter engines, which were being produced at the Mitaka Plant at the time, to manufacture a 356cc engine for light vehicles, and to begin development of a four-seater light passenger car based on this engine. This was a car that surpassed the "National Car Concept " planned by the MITI at the time.

On 17 January 1956, the first meeting bearing the name "K-10" was held in the director's office at the Mitaka Plant. The main topics of discussion were reports on the technical studies conducted at each plant and the review of the draft order for prototype production. However, since this was a matter that would determine the future of Fuji Heavy Industries.

As a design base, Sasaki made a wooden mold with nails driven into it to indicate the limits of the body shell, and it was delivered to Sasaki in early June 1956.

The first prototype of the K-10 was completed in June 1957.

The clay model was completed in 1957. The production "K-10" was first widely introduced as the Subaru 360 at a press conference held at the Marunouchi headquarters on 3 March 1958. Then the Subaru 360 made his first public appearance at a public exhibition held over three days, in 28–30 March 1958.

== Design ==
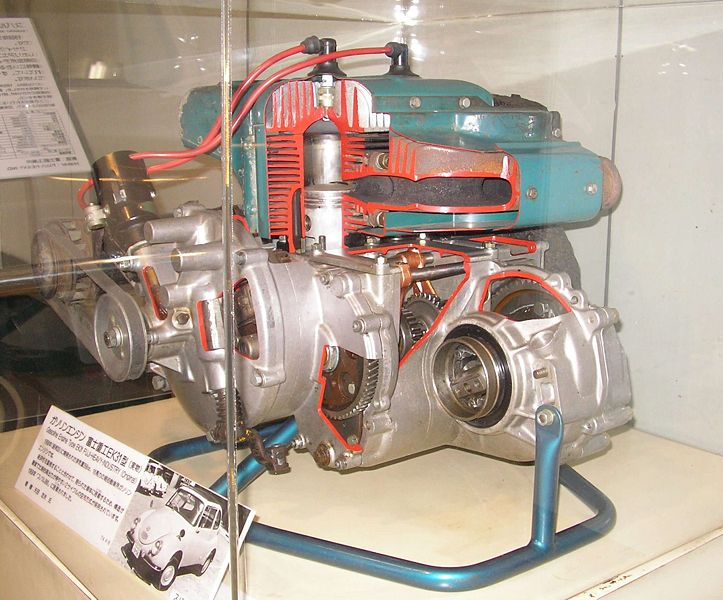
EK31 engine of Subaru 360

The 360 featured an air-cooled, two-stroke inline 2-cylinder 356 cc engine mounted transversely at the rear, and was introduced March 3, 1958.

As with many other small two-stroke gas-engined cars, oil needed to be premixed with the petrol (gasoline), with the fuel tank lid serving as a measuring cup. In 1964, the "Subarumatic" lubrication system provided automatic mixing via a reservoir in the engine compartment.

Floor-mounted controls located between the driver and passenger seat included choke, heater and fuel cut-off—the latter to accommodate gravity fed fuel which obviated the need for a fuel pump. The initial production featured a full metal dash board and three-speed manual gearbox, while subsequent models featured a partially padded dash with an open glove compartment, pop-out rear quarter windows, split front bench seat, map pockets, a four-speed manual and optional three-speed-based 'Autoclutch' transmission—the latter which eliminated the clutch pedal and operated the clutch via an electromagnet.

Final assembly included wheel alignment, brake testing, chassis dynometer, headlight testing, and high-pressure water spray testing.

In contrast to the Volkswagen Beetle, the 360 is much smaller, less powerful, and was not nearly as well accepted in the global marketplace. The body was of monocoque construction and used a lightweight fiberglass roof panel. In the post war period, more automobiles would switch to unibody construction, which is now the norm for passenger cars and even many light trucks. Many of the ideas came from engineers from the former Nakajima Aircraft Company, which became Fuji Heavy Industries. The "suicide doors" are hinged at the rear, which Consumer Reports noted resulted in a partially locked door pulling open in the wind during testing.

== Performance ==
Equipped with a three-speed manual transmission, the 360 had a top speed of 100 km/h (60 mph), and with a curb weight under 450 kg (1,000 lb), the 360 was exempt from compliance with US safety regulations. Consumer Reports recorded a 0–80 km/h (0–50 mph) time of about 37 seconds and reported 9.4–6.7 L/100 km; 30–42 mpg_{‑imp} (25–35 mpg_{‑US}), despite Subaru's claimed 3.6 L/100 km; 79 mpg_{‑imp} (66 mpg_{‑US}). When introduced in 1958, the 360's engine produced 16 PS (12 kW). This later increased to 18 PS (13 kW) and then 20 PS (15 kW). In August 1968, responding to a new crop of more powerful kei cars, power was increased to 25 PS (18 kW). An optional 36 PS (26 kW) twin-carbureted engine also became available for the 360 Young SS in November 1968, achieving 100 PS per liter. The performance and size limitations were largely the result of its having been engineered and designed for Japanese driving conditions. The speed limits in Japan are realistically set at 40 km/h (25 mph) in urban areas, with average driving distances at 8–13 km (5–8 mi) per day.

== Variants ==
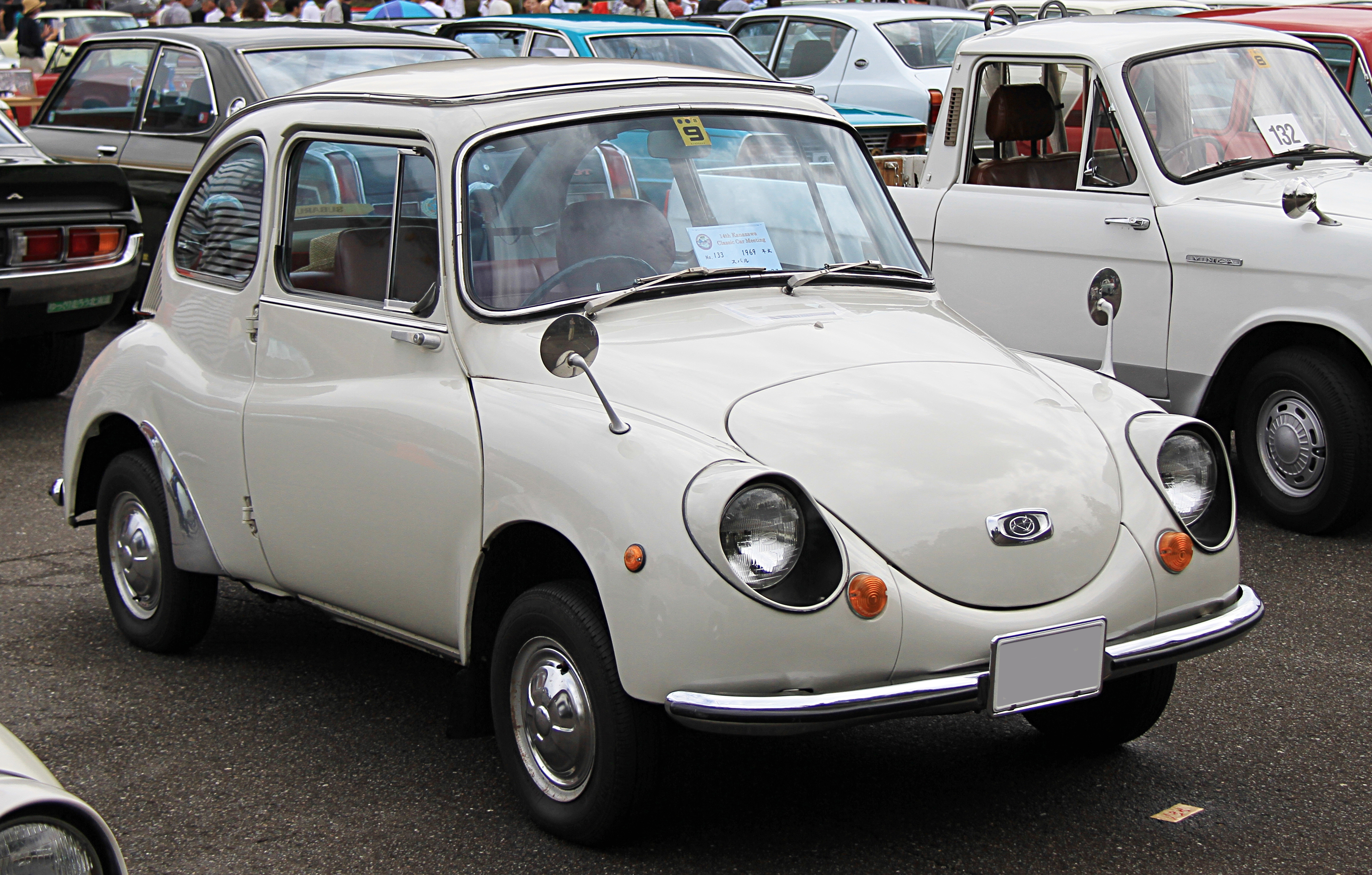

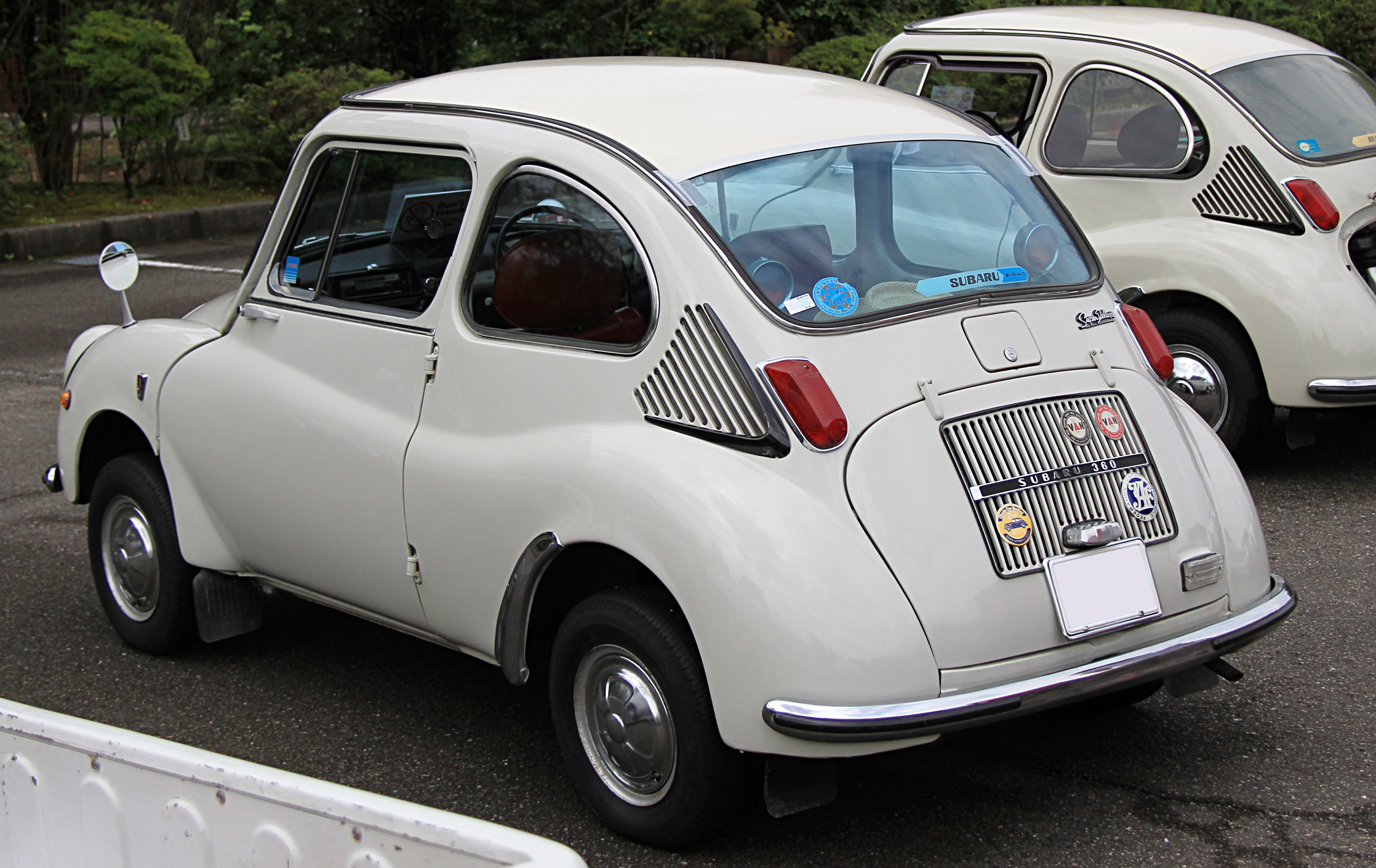
Later model (1969) Subaru 360

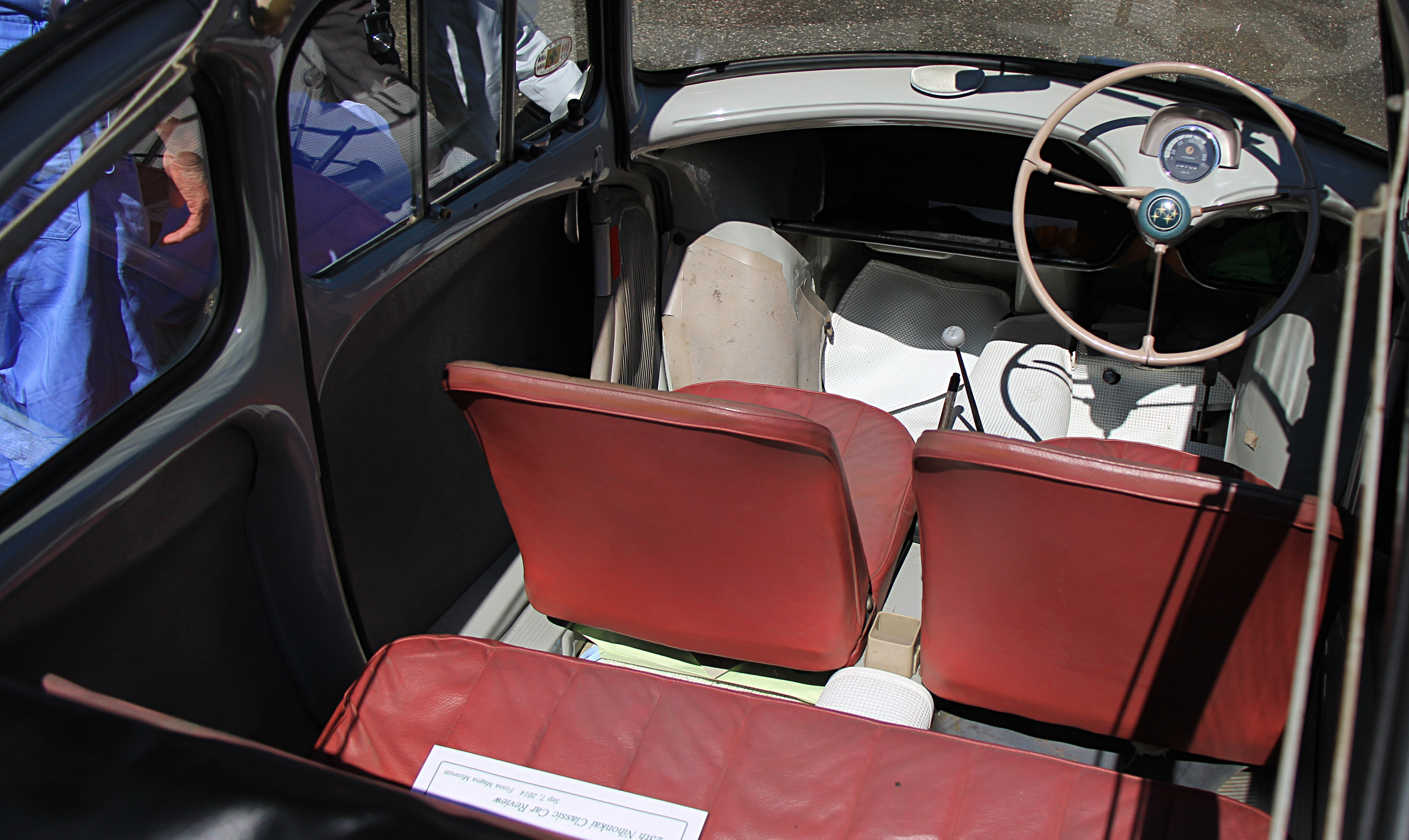
1958–1961 interior

Several variants were produced. In 1961, the Subaru 360 Deluxe was newly released, and in 1962 and 1963, both the Standard and Deluxe models received improvements to their interiors and exteriors, as well as enhancements to their equipment.

Furthermore, in 1964, Subaru launched the Super Deluxe sedan series, as well as models equipped with a sub-transmission (over-top) that could be used with six forward gears (Deluxe and Super Deluxe). They also released a station wagon (called the Custom), a commercial vehicle that replaced the Commercial, further expanding the variety of models available. A convertible also available.

In 1968, two sport models known as the Subaru Young S, which had a slightly upgraded (EK32 "F") engine and transmission (4 gears instead of 3), bucket seats and a tachometer along with a black, white striped roof with a dent along the middle to put one's surfboard, and the Subaru Young SS, which had all the Young S enhancements, but also the EK32 "S" engine with chromed cylinders and dual BS32 Mikuni Solex carburetors, producing 36 PS (26 kW) - and 100 brake horsepower per litre.

To accommodate the city car market and export markets, Subaru released the larger 450. Available in Japan between November 1960 and 1966, Increased the engine's displacement to 423 cc using the Subaru EK51 series engine. The maximum output reaches 23 PS (17 kW). Sales of the Subaru 450 in Japan was discontinued in 1966, due to poor sales.

From 1961 onwards, a flat-nosed truck and van called the Sambar were also produced using the 360's engine, with arrangements similar to the Volkswagen Transporter in a smaller size. Many small businesses became very successful thanks to the pickup's small size for tight streets, quickness, ease to drive and great fuel economy.

This model was also given the name Subaru Maia. The Maia variant was the sole sedan model imported into Australia (approximately 35 examples) in 1961 - along with approximately 38 Sambar vans and trucks.

Subaru 360 Custom

Subaru 360 Custom rear view

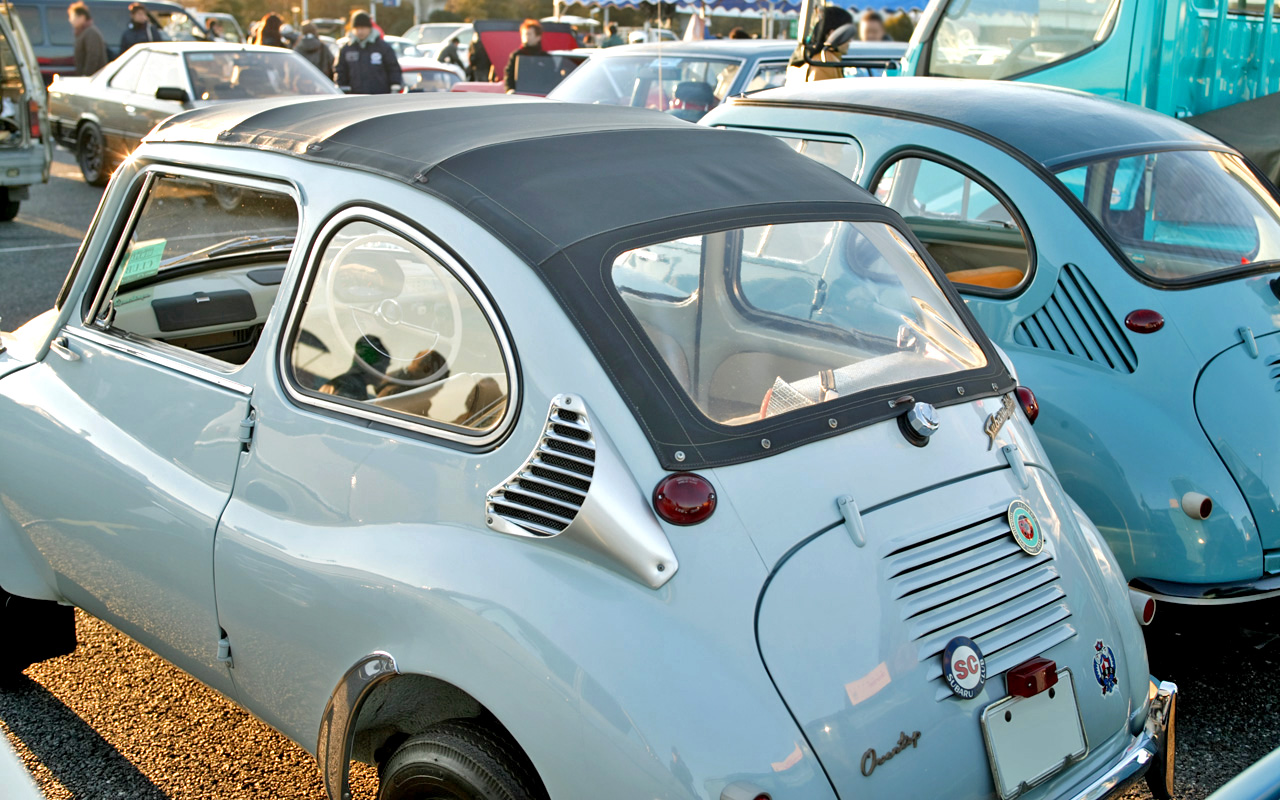
Subaru 360 Convertible

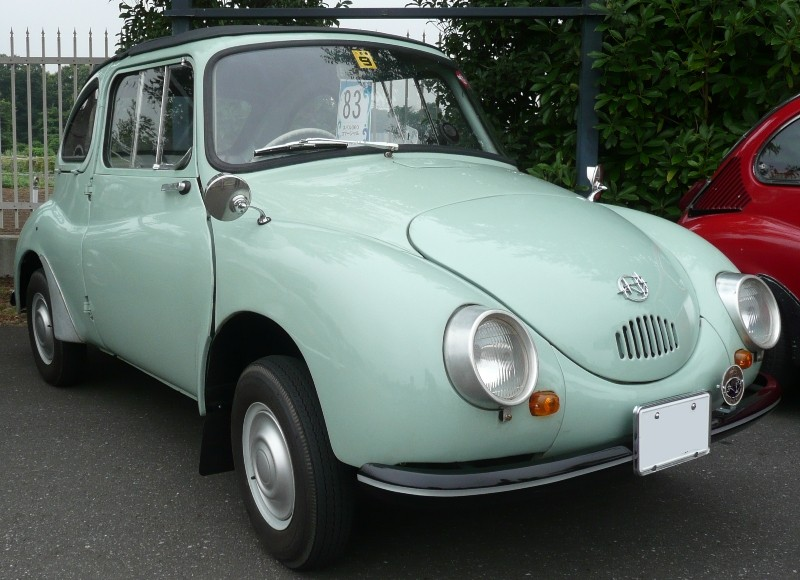
Subaru 360 Commercial

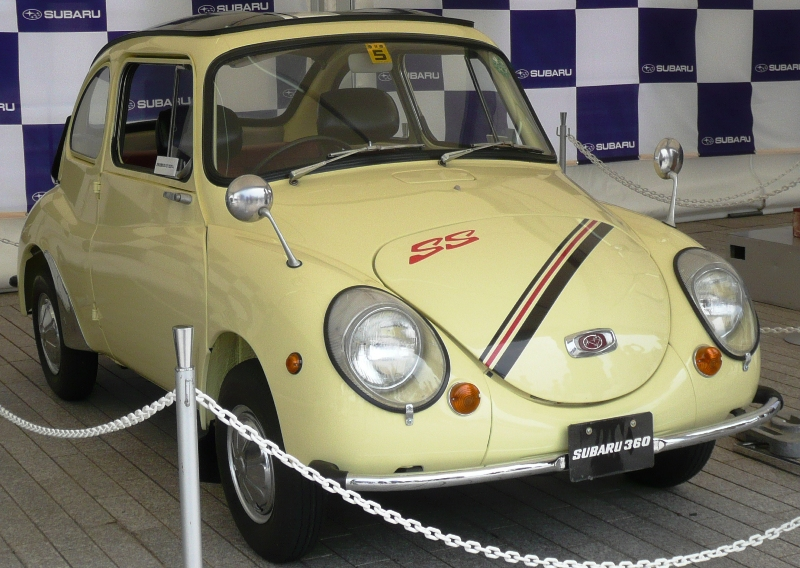
Subaru Young SS

== Export ==
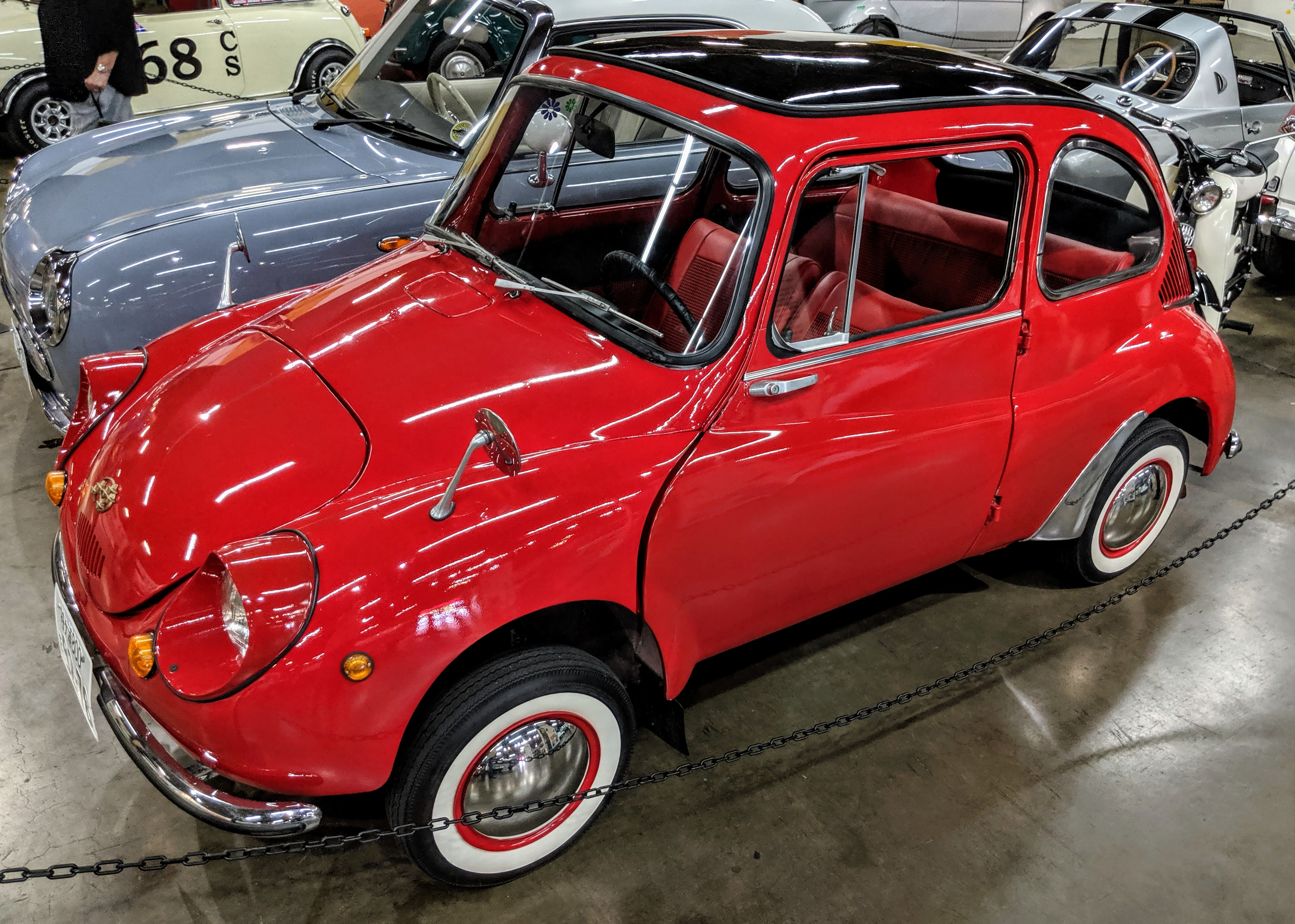
1970 Subaru 360 on display at the California Automobile Museum

A used car dealer in Ballarat, Victoria (Frank O'Brien) brought approximately 73 Subaru 360 vehicles into Australia in 1961. This was a mix of Maia sedans and Sambar vans and trucks. Unfortunately they suffered from overheating problems and although a solution was eventually found, it came too late, as the associated losses were too great for the dealership to cope with and further importations ceased.

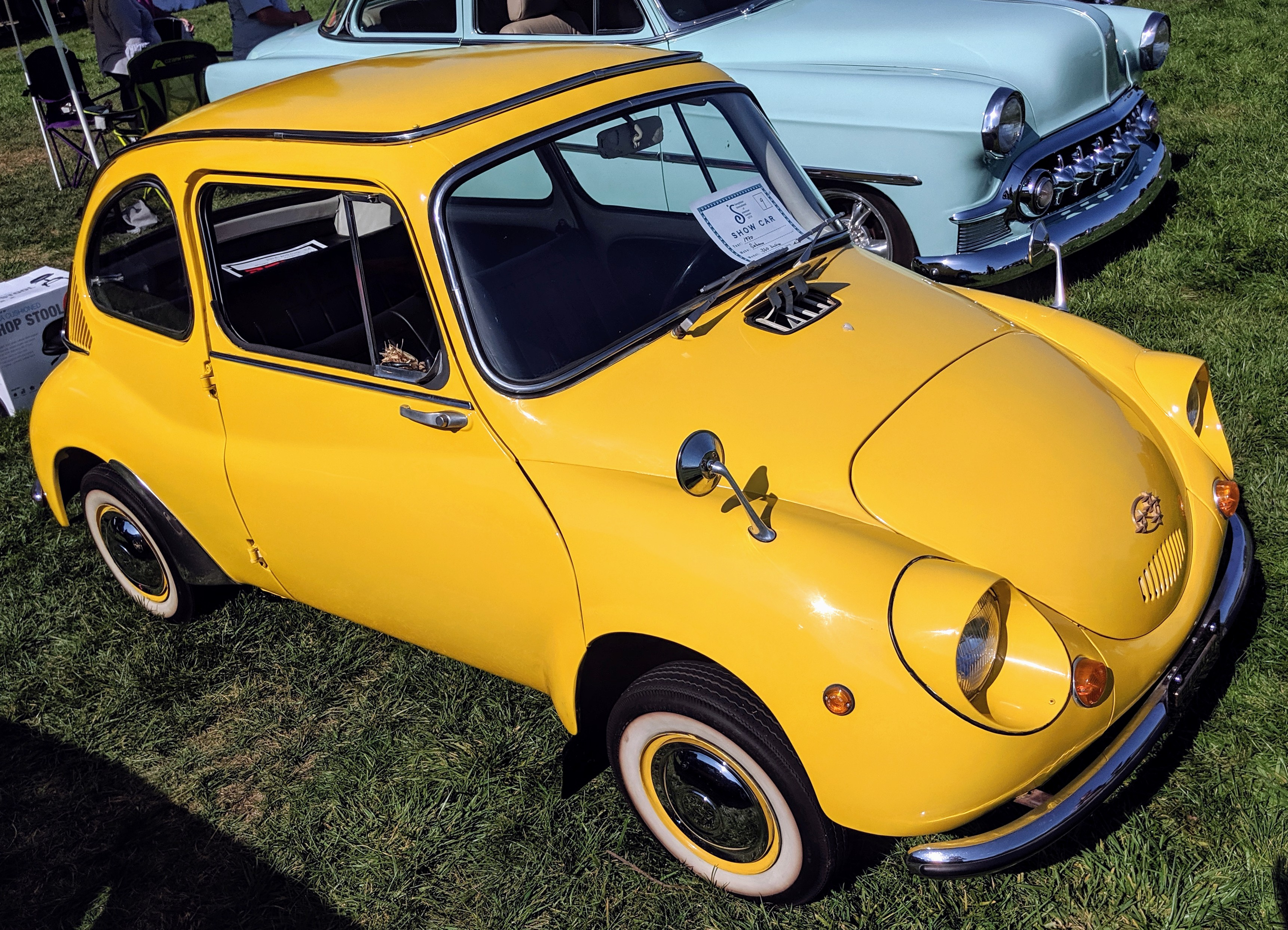
1970 Subaru 360 Deluxe in the United States

From 1968, approximately 10,000 were exported to the US, with an original price of $1,297 ($12,008 in 2025 dollars). The 360 was imported to the United States by Malcolm Bricklin before he later manufactured his own cars. The Subaru 360 received notoriety in 1969, when Consumer Reports magazine branded the automobile "Not Acceptable" because of safety concerns and lack of power. Because the car weighed under 1000 pounds, it was exempt from normal safety standards, but it was reported that it fared badly in a test crash against a large American car with the bumper ending up in the passenger compartment of the Subaru.

Sales soon collapsed, and there were various rumors of Subaru 360s being tossed overboard or being shredded to pieces. It was also reported that many 360s sat on dealers' lots for two or three years without ever being purchased.

The Subaru 360 was replaced by the less popular but more advanced R-2 which was quickly superseded by the long-lived Subaru Rex model.
