= Shinroku Momose =

Japanese engineer (1919–1997)

- 百瀬 晋六
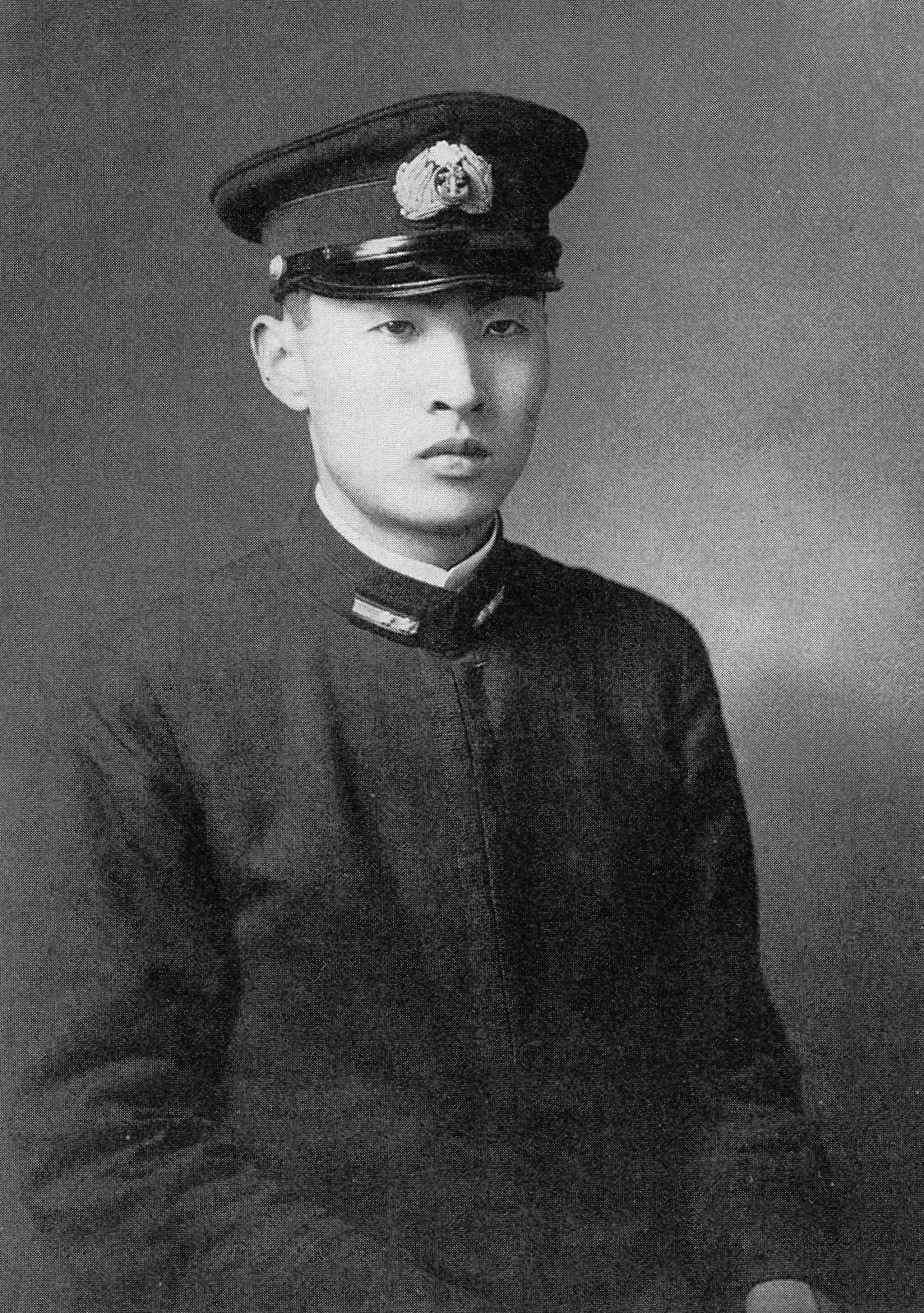
- Momose in 1943
- Born: 20 February 1919; Shiojiri, Nagano Prefecture
- Died: 21 January 1997 (aged 77)
- Education: Tokyo Imperial University
- Engineering career
- Discipline: Aeronautics
- Projects: Subaru 1500
- Significant design: Subaru 360; Subaru Sambar; Subaru 1000
- Awards: Japan Automotive Hall of Fame (2004)

Shinroku Momose (百瀬 晋六, Momose Shinroku; 20 February 1919 – 21 January 1997) was a Japanese aircraft and automotive engineer. He is famous for the development of the Subaru 360, the Subaru Sambar and the Subaru 1000 series.

== History ==
- February 20, 1919 – Born in Shiojiri, Nagano Prefecture as the second son of a Sake brewer.
- April 1939 – Entered the Department of Aeronautics, Tokyo Imperial University (Majored in engine)
- January 1942 – Joined Nakajima Aircraft Company. He was enlisted as an ensign by the Imperial Japanese Navy twenty days after he joined Nakajima. He was attached to the Yokosuka Naval Air Technical Arsenal ("Kugisho") and assigned to explore jet engine and gas turbine.
- 1944 – As a Naval officer, he was sent back to his home company Nakajima to examine the installation of turbocharger to the Nakajima Homare engine of the Nakajima C6N
- August 15, 1945 – Around ten design staff including Momose remained at Koizumi Plant of Nakajima Aircraft Company.
- 1949 – Designed and launched the monocoque rear-engine bus Fuji TR014X-2.

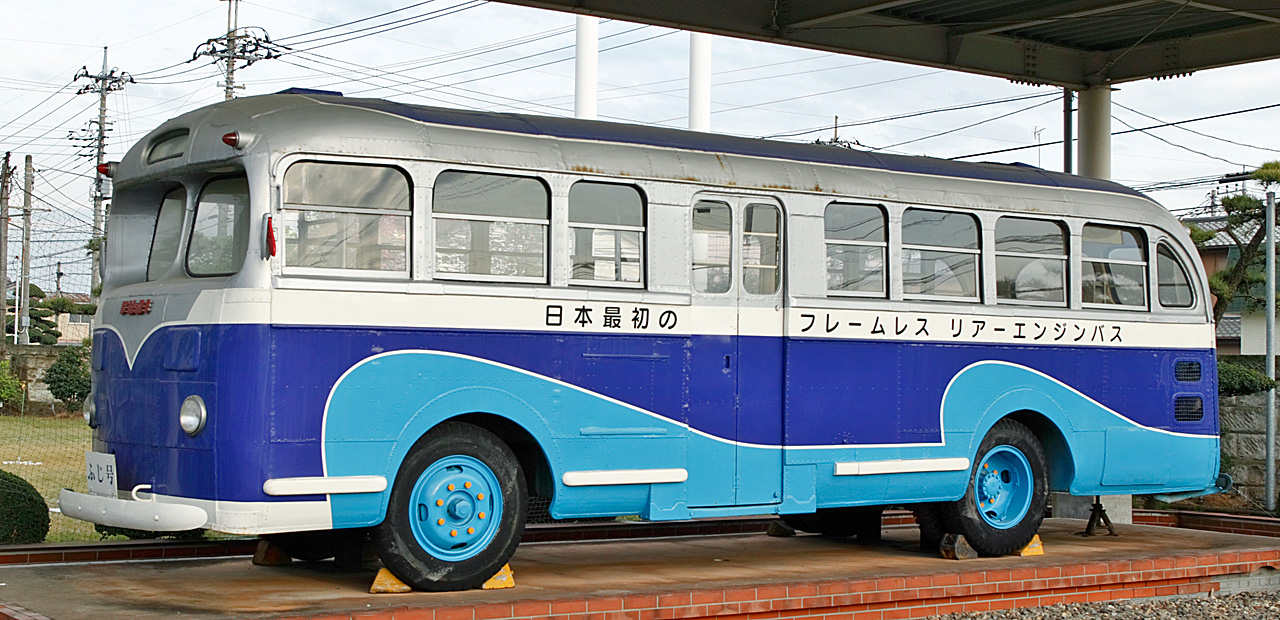
Fuji TR014X-2 Bus

- January 1951 – Assigned to design the Subaru 1500 (project number "P-1").
- February 1954 – Initial model of the Subaru 1500 was completed.

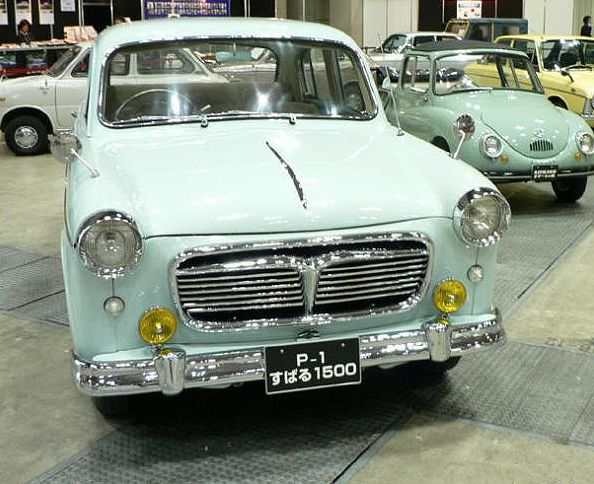
Subaru 1500 (P-1)

- December 1955 – Production of Subaru 1500 was cancelled and Momose was assigned to design the Subaru 360 at the same time.
- November 1957 – Assigned as the senior engineering manager, Isesaki Plant, Fuji Heavy Industries
- March 3, 1958 – Subaru 360 was launched.

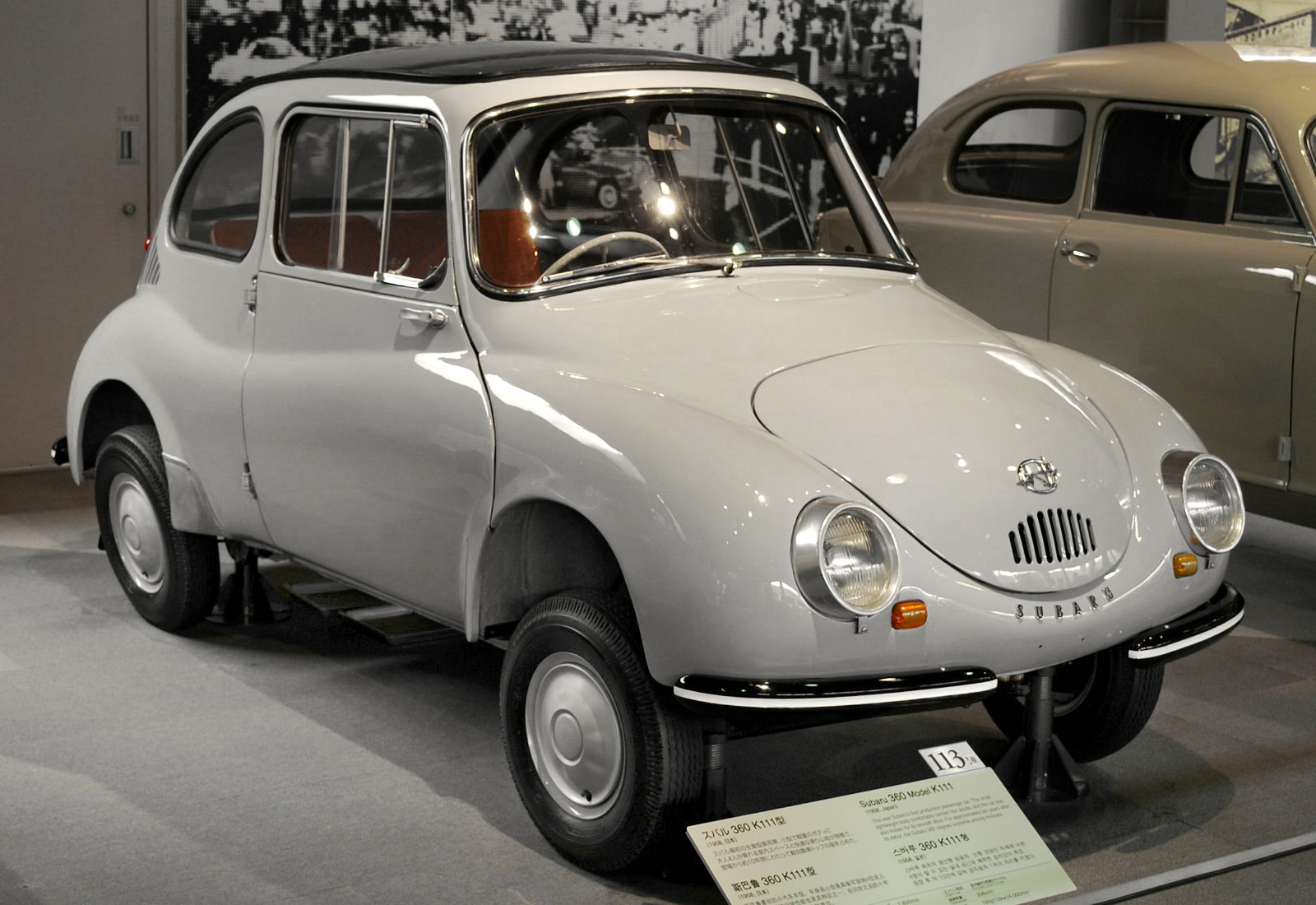
Subaru 360 (K111)

- October 1960 – Assigned as the senior engineering manager, Gunma Workshop (Ota City), Fuji Heavy Industries
- February 1961 – The first generation Subaru Sambar was launched.

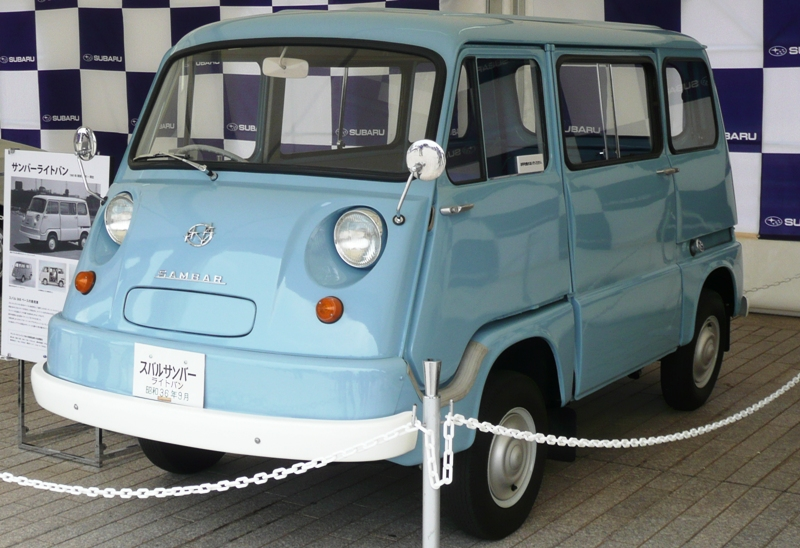
Subaru Sambar

- October 21, 1965 – Subaru 1000 was shown to the press at the Tokyo Hilton Hotel (where The Beatles stayed in June and July 1966)
- May 14, 1966 – Subaru 1000 was launched.

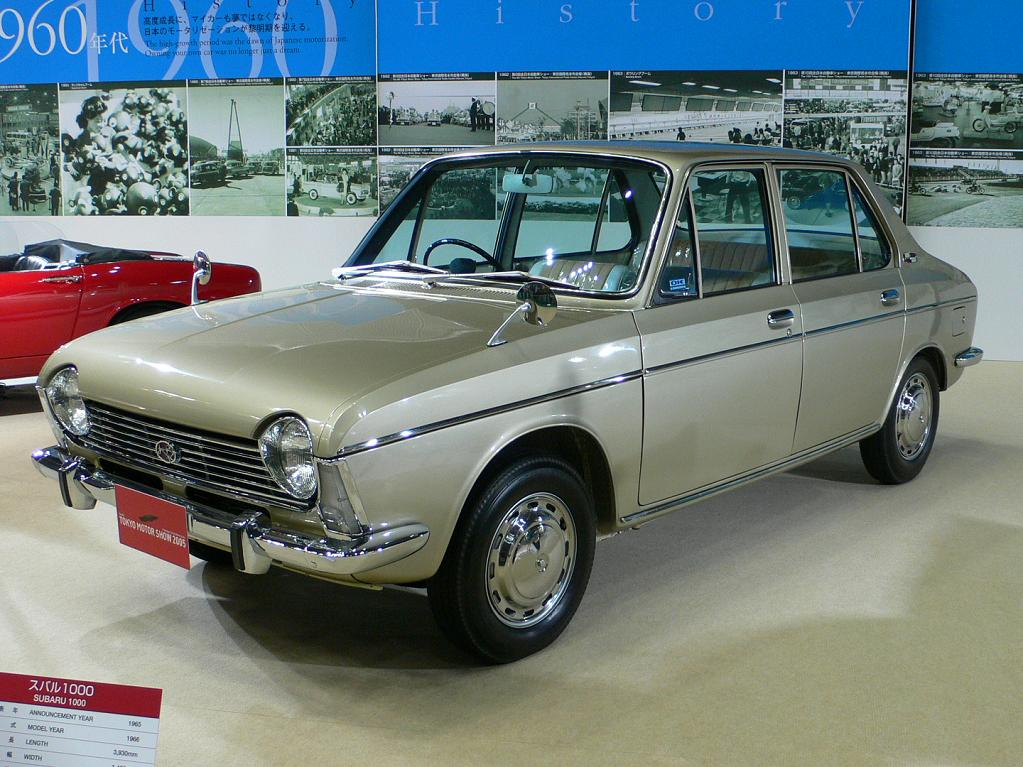
Subaru 1000 (A522)

- October 1966 – Promoted to the engineering director, Fuji Heavy Industries
- May 1967 – Promoted to a board member of Fuji Heavy Industries
- August 1968 – Assigned as the executive officer of the Subaru Engineering Division
- June 1975 – Assigned as the executive officer of the Subaru Service Division
- June 1983 – Assigned as a statutory auditor, Fuji Heavy Industries
- 1987 - Awarded to the Technology Contribution Prize by the Society of Automotive Engineers of Japan (JSAE)
- June 1991 – Assigned as the technical advisor of the Subaru Research Laboratory
- January 21, 1997 – Deceased
- 2004 – Inducted to the Japan Automotive Hall of Fame

== See also ==
- Nakajima Aircraft Company
- Nakajima C6N
- Yokosuka Naval Air Technical Arsenal
- Fuji Heavy Industries
- Subaru 1500
- Subaru 360
- Subaru Sambar
- Subaru 1000
