= Subaru 1500 =

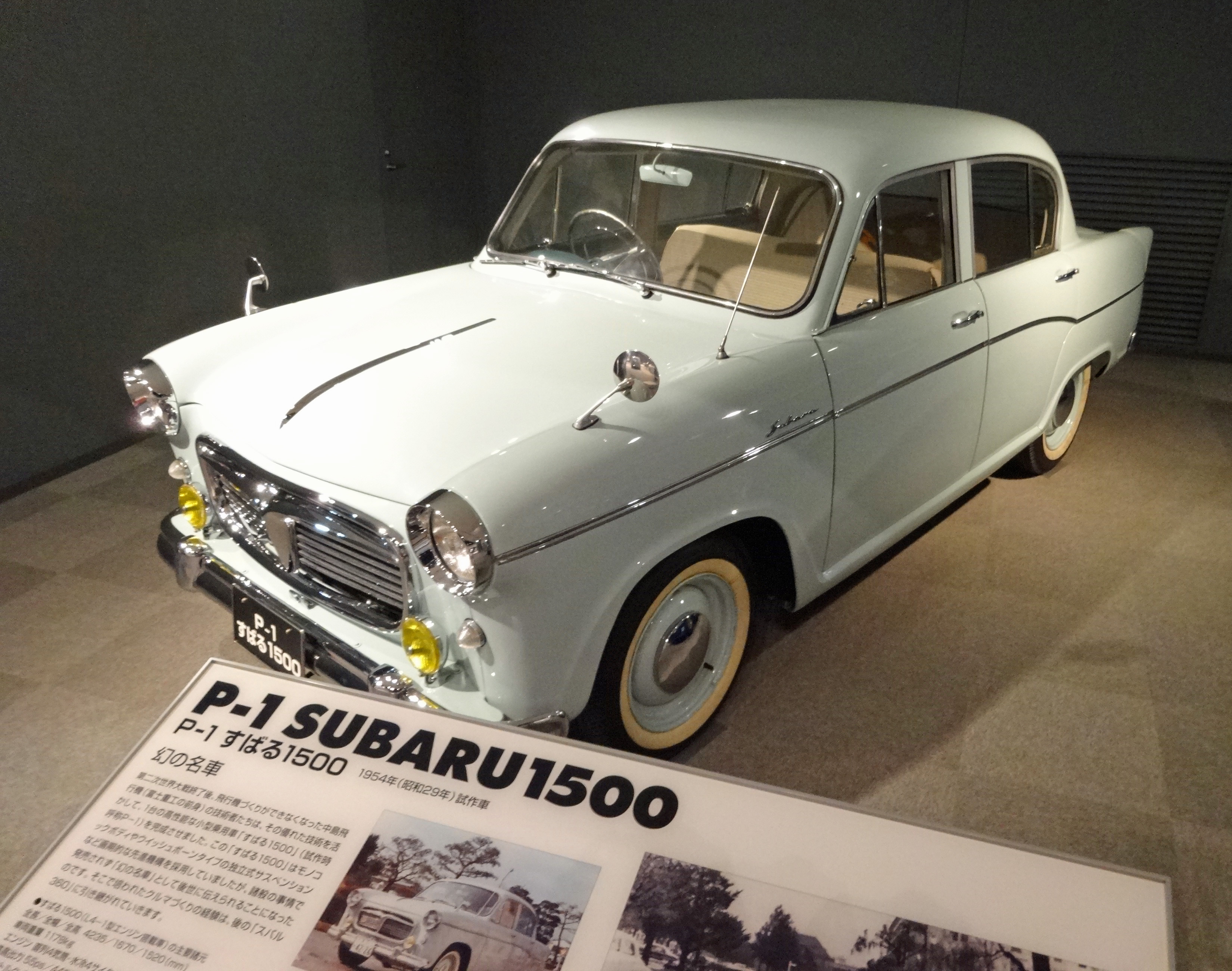

Overview
- Manufacturer: Subaru (Fuji Heavy Industries)
- Also called: Subaru P-1
- Production: 1954
- Designer: Shinroku Momose

Body and chassis
- Class: compact
- Body style: Sedan
- Layout: FR layout

Powertrain
- Engine: 1.5 L FG4A OHV I4; 1.5 L L4-1 OHV I4

Dimensions
- Length: 4,235 mm (166.7 in)
- Width: 1,670 mm (65.7 in)
- Height: 1,520 mm (59.8 in)
- Curb weight: 1,230 kg (2,710 lb)

The Subaru 1500 is the first car built by Fuji Heavy Industries, with the development code-name of P1. The prototype used a monocoque body structure and adopting the "ponton" style appearance, with an independent front wishbone suspension and a rear leaf spring suspension with three plates and a live rear axle.

The company was already manufacturing the Fuji Rabbit scooter, and wanted to explore manufacturing an automobile to compete with established Japanese manufacturing efforts at the time.

The P-1 was water-cooled and used two different 1.5 litre OHV four-cylinder inline engines. The original version, code named "FG4A", was sourced from Peugeot's 202 and built by Fuji Precision Technology (this later became the Prince Motor Company). The FG4A engine was related to the Prince GA4 with some modification, and was shared with the Prince Sedan introduced in 1952. Prince had not agreed to Fuji Precision Technology providing this engine to a competing car and Fuji Heavy Industries found themselves obliged to develop a different engine in-house. This was code named "L4-1"; it was also a 1.5 litre OHV engine but it was 20 percent lighter than the previous engine used. Maximum power is 48 PS (35 kW; 47 bhp) for the FG4A, 55 PS (40 kW; 54 bhp) for the L4-1.

Only 20 P-1's were built, all in 1954, with 11 vehicles using the FG4A engine, with the remaining nine cars using the updated L4-1 engine. 14 of the 20 cars were built for private use, while the other six units were provided to the taxi companies in Isesaki, Ota and Honjo Cities for private testing, with successful results. Subaru had been very confident in the car's abilities, but with both Toyota (Corona) and Prince (Skyline) about to release new cars in the 1500 cc class they considered the market situation impossible without a very large investment in mass manufacturing capabilities.

It was Subaru's first vehicle, and the company would not produce another front-engine/rear-wheel drive vehicle until the BRZ in 2012.

== Official Website ==
- Subaru History website (japanese)
