= Subaru EA engine =

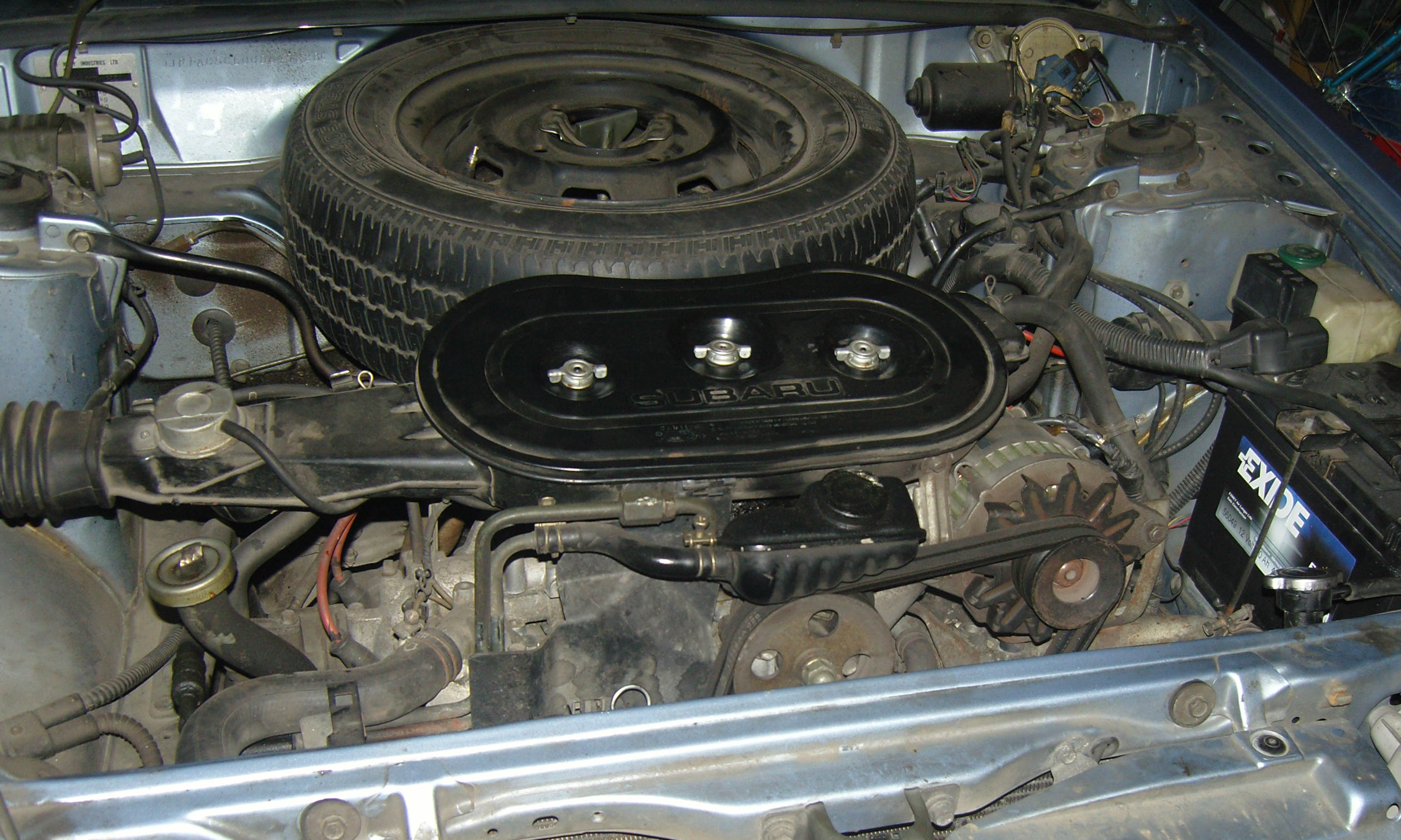

Overview
- Manufacturer: Subaru
- Production: 1966–1994

Layout
- Configuration: flat-four petrol engine
- Valvetrain: OHV/SOHC

Combustion
- Fuel type: Petrol/gasoline
- Cooling system: water

Chronology
- Successor: Subaru EJ engine

The Subaru EA engine is a series of automobile internal combustion engines manufactured by Subaru, a division of Fuji Heavy Industries. All EA series engines are of a flat-4 design, and have always been water cooled.

== Design and history ==
Prior to 1966, Subaru was known for producing kei cars in Japan; for their first four-passenger model, the firm developed an air-cooled boxer engine for a prototype of the Subaru 1500 in 1960, but Fuji Heavy Industries was unable to continue development due to a shortage of funding. A new prototype front-wheel-drive car was built with a 923 cc (56 cu in) water-cooled boxer engine, which became the basis for the Subaru 1000 and the EA-52 boxer engine. The car began sales to the public starting in 1966.

The EA series engines have aluminum heads with aluminum blocks. Each cylinder has two valves, one for exhaust and one for intake. They came in either an OHV pushrod or SOHC configuration. The engine was very short, only about 400 mm (15.7 in) long overall. The crankshaft had three main bearings.

Subaru produced the EA series from 1966 to 1994, and were found in the Subaru FF-1 Star, the Subaru Leone, the Subaru Brat (Brumby), the Subaru Loyale, the Subaru Omega (coupé), the Subaru Vortex, the Subaru RX, and the Subaru XT (Alcyone).

Summary of specifications
Model		Years	Size			Compression ratio	Valvetrain	Output	
Model		Years	Displacement	Bore	Stroke	Compression ratio	Valvetrain	Power	Torque
EA-52		1966–1970	977.2 cc 60 cu in	72 mm 2.8 in	60 mm 2.4 in	9.0:1	OHV Pushrod	55 PS; 40 kW; 54 hp at 6000	57 lb⋅ft 77 N⋅m at 3200
EA-53		1967–1968	977.2 cc 60 cu in	72 mm 2.8 in	60 mm 2.4 in	10.0:1	OHV Pushrod, twin carburetor	67 PS; 49 kW; 66 hp at 6600	59 lb⋅ft; 80 N⋅m; 8.2 kg⋅m at 4600
EA-61		1969–1972	1,088 cc 66 cu in	76 mm 3.0 in	60 mm 2.4 in	8.5:1	OHV Pushrod	62 PS; 46 kW; 61 hp at 5600	65 lb⋅ft 88 N⋅m at 4000
EA-62	(regular)	1971–1972	1,267.5 cc 77 cu in	82 mm 3.2 in	60 mm 2.4 in	9.0:1	OHV Pushrod	80 PS; 59 kW; 79 hp at 6400	73 lb⋅ft 99 N⋅m at 4000
EA-62	EA-62S	1969–1972	1,267.5 cc 77 cu in	82 mm 3.2 in	60 mm 2.4 in	10.0:1	OHV Pushrod, twin carburetor	93 PS; 68 kW; 92 hp at 7000	76 lb⋅ft 103 N⋅m at 5000
EA-63	(JDM)	1973–1979	1,361 cc 83 cu in	85 mm 3.3 in	60 mm 2.4 in	8.5:1	OHV Pushrod	71–77 hp 53–57 kW; 72–78 PS at 6000	74–76 lb⋅ft 100–103 N⋅m at 3600–4000
EA-63	(US)	1973–1976	1,361 cc 83 cu in	85 mm 3.3 in	60 mm 2.4 in	8.5:1	OHV Pushrod	58 hp 43 kW; 59 PS at 5600	68 lb⋅ft 92 N⋅m at 2400
EA-64		1973–1979	1,176 cc 72 cu in	79 mm 3.1 in	60 mm 2.4 in	9.0:1	OHV Pushrod	68 hp 51 kW; 69 PS at 6000	69 lb⋅ft 94 N⋅m at 3600
EA-65	(JDM)	1979–1984	1,298 cc 79 cu in	83 mm 3.3 in	60 mm 2.4 in	9.0:1	OHV Pushrod	72 PS; 53 kW; 71 hp at 5600	98 N⋅m; 72 lb⋅ft at 3200
EA-65	?	1979–1994	1,298 cc 79 cu in	83 mm 3.3 in	60 mm 2.4 in	9.0:1	OHV Pushrod	65 hp 48 kW; 66 PS at 5600	85 lb⋅ft 115 N⋅m at 3200
EA-71	(JDM)	1976–1994	1,595 cc 97 cu in	92 mm 3.6 in	60 mm 2.4 in	9.0:1	OHV Pushrod chain drive	82–87 PS; 60–64 kW; 81–86 hp at 5600	87–89 lb⋅ft 118–121 N⋅m at 3600
EA-71	EA-71S (JDM)	1976–1994	1,595 cc 97 cu in	92 mm 3.6 in	60 mm 2.4 in	9.0:1	OHV Pushrod chain drive, twin carb	94 hp 70 kW; 95 PS at 6400	89 lb⋅ft 121 N⋅m at 4000
EA-71	(US)	1976–1979	1,595 cc 97 cu in	92 mm 3.6 in	60 mm 2.4 in	9.0:1	OHV Pushrod chain drive	67 hp 50 kW; 68 PS at 5200	81 lb⋅ft 110 N⋅m at 2400
EA-71	(US)	1980–1987	1,595 cc 97 cu in	92 mm 3.6 in	60 mm 2.4 in	9.0:1	OHV Pushrod	68 hp 51 kW; 69 PS at 4800	84 lb⋅ft 114 N⋅m at 2800
EA-72		never released	1,595 cc 97 cu in	92 mm 3.6 in	60 mm 2.4 in	8.7:1	SOHC	not published	
EA-81	(US)	1980–1994	1,781 cc 109 cu in	92 mm 3.6 in	67 mm 2.6 in	8.7:1	OHV Pushrod	73 hp 54 kW; 74 PS at 4800	94 lb⋅ft 127 N⋅m at 2400
EA-81	(EU)	1980–1994	1,781 cc 109 cu in	92 mm 3.6 in	67 mm 2.6 in	8.7:1	OHV Pushrod	79–81 hp 59–60 kW; 80–82 PS at 6000	97 lb⋅ft 132 N⋅m at 2400
EA-81	EA-81T (turbo)	1983–1984	1,781 cc 109 cu in	92 mm 3.6 in	67 mm 2.6 in	7.7:1	OHV Pushrod	95 hp 71 kW; 96 PS at 4200	123 lb⋅ft 167 N⋅m at 2800
EA-82	(carb)	1984–1994	1,781 cc 109 cu in	92 mm 3.6 in	67 mm 2.6 in	8.7/9.0:1	SOHC, carburetor	84 hp 63 kW; 85 PS at 5200	101 lb⋅ft 137 N⋅m at 3200
EA-82	(SPFI)	1984–1994	1,781 cc 109 cu in	92 mm 3.6 in	67 mm 2.6 in	9.0:1	SOHC, SPFI	90 hp 67 kW; 91 PS at 5600	101 lb⋅ft 137 N⋅m at 3200
EA-82	(MPFI)	1984–1994	1,781 cc 109 cu in	92 mm 3.6 in	67 mm 2.6 in	9.5:1	SOHC, MPFI	97 hp 72 kW; 98 PS at 5200	103 lb⋅ft 140 N⋅m at 3200
EA-82	EA-82T (turbo) USA	1984–1990	1,781 cc 109 cu in	92 mm 3.6 in	67 mm 2.6 in	7.7:1	SOHC, MPFI	111–115 hp 83–86 kW; 113–117 PS at 5200	134 lb⋅ft 182 N⋅m at 2800
EA-82	EA-82T (turbo) Europe/Japan	1984–1990	1,781 cc 109 cu in	92 mm 3.6 in	67 mm 2.6 in	7.7:1	SOHC, MPFI	134–136 PS; 99–100 kW; 132–134 hp at 5200	145 lb⋅ft 197 N⋅m at 2800
	EA82T (turbo) Works Group A/B	1984–1988	1,781 cc 109 cu in	92 mm 3.6 in	67 mm 2.6 in	7.5:1	SOHC, MPFI	180–190 hp 134–142 kW; 182–193 PS at 6450	170 lb⋅ft 230 N⋅m at 5200

== Models ==
=== EA-52 ===
The Subaru EA-52 engine was produced from 1966 until 1970.

==== Found on ====
- Subaru 1000
- Subaru FF-1 Star

==== EA-53 ====
The Subaru EA-53 was used in the 1967 Subaru 1000 Sports Sedan, sold in Japan. It used twin carburetors. This engine was used in the September 1968 Japan Alpine Rally which the car won in the 1000cc engine class.

=== EA-61 ===
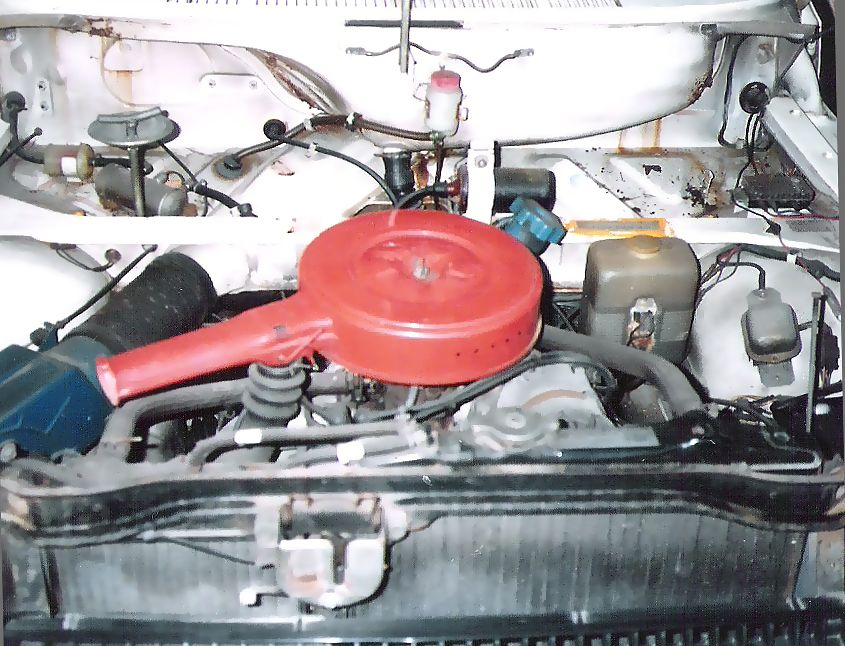
Subaru EA61 1.1L

The Subaru EA-61 engine was produced from 1969 to 1972. The Japanese-spec Subaru FF-1 Sport Sedan and the FF-1 Super Touring sedan used twin carburetors, with the engine designation EA-61S. It was sold in the United States only for the 1971 model year. It was also briefly available in the first Leone, only in 1100 Van specification.

==== Found on ====
- Subaru FF-1 1100/Star
- 1972–197? Subaru Leone A21 Van

=== EA-62 ===
The Subaru EA-62 engine was produced from 1971 to 1972. It is the only EA-series engine with rear-facing exhaust ports.

==== Found on ====
- Subaru FF-1 1300 G
- Subaru G (1300G in United States)

==== EA-62S ====
This engine used twin carburetors from Zenith-Stromberg.

===== Found on =====
- Subaru FF-1 1300G Sports Sedan and Super Touring (Japan)

=== EA-63 ===
The Subaru EA-63 engine was produced from 1973 to 1979, although it stopped being used in US-market cars in 1976.

==== Found on ====
- 1973–1979 Subaru Leone

=== EA-64 ===
The Subaru EA-64 engine was produced from 1973 to 1979. The engine disappeared from the sedan catalogs in September 1975, as the new emissions regulations would simply make the car too slow. As commercial vehicles didn't have to meet the new stricter regulations, it continued to be available in the Van 1200 Standard until the end of production of the first generation Leone in 1979.

==== Found on ====
- 1973–1975 Subaru Leone (sedan)
- 1973–1977 Subaru Leone (van) A25
- 1973–1979 Subaru Leone (van) A65

=== EA-65 ===
The Subaru EA-65 engine was produced from 1975 to 1985

==== Found on ====
- 1975–1985 Subaru Leone for Japanese domestic market, Europe, Africa Asia and Latin America.
- The only first sedan with a similar box body shape with same shape as the nissan model.
- Equipped with an internal temperature control Ac different from the current compressor pump.
- Had the two wheel drive for fuel efficiency the 1298 cc with options of 4wd.
- In African market became the family car for major house hold nick named ("Mama Yao") meaning the mother of Subaru due to its unique speed and pick performance .
- The very first edition with a speed clock of 220km/h display.
- The Leone EA65 became an icon in the safari rally and hence was considered the best sedan model for off-road.

=== EA-71 ===
The Subaru EA-71 engine was produced in two different designs; from 1976 to 1994, originally the first design was a redesign of the EA-63 block, known as the "Narrow Case EA71" then Subaru completely redesigned it to make the newer version known as "Fat Case EA71" which also led to a stroked version known as the EA81. The availability in USA for the EA71 ended in 1990 on the hatchback models. It came with a carburetor and the last editions for JDM featured throttle-body injection, found on the "Maia" editions of the third generation Subaru Leone. The engine came either with solid lifters or hydraulic lifters.

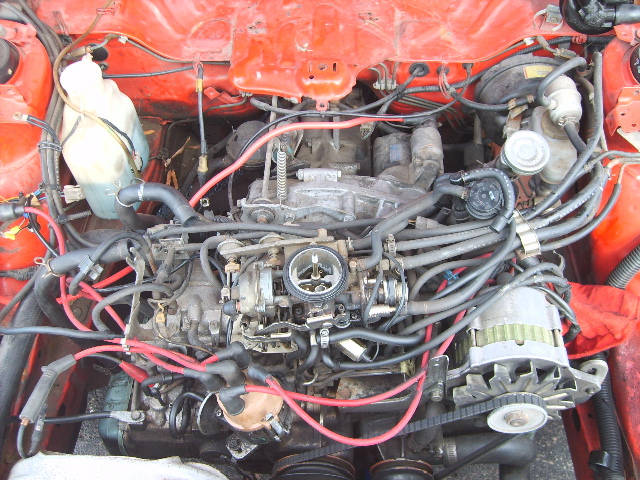
Subaru EA-71 Engine

==== Found on ====
- 1976–1994 Subaru Leone
- 1978–1980 Subaru BRAT
- 1980–1990 Subaru Hatchback

==== EA-71S ====
This engine used twin Hitachi carburetors. This engine also dominated the Japanese FJ1600 open-seat racing class for decades (similar to Formula Ford in Europe and elsewhere), making it the de facto standard engine.

===== Found on =====
- 1979–1981 Subaru Hatchback
- 1979–1980 Subaru Brat

=== EA-72 Concept Engine ===
There was an unreleased EA-72 concept engine Subaru developed for use in the Japanese Market in 1989. It was essentially an EA-82 with an EA-71 crankshaft. This engine never came about as the Subaru EJ15 and EJ16 were already in development for this purpose.

==== Specifications ====
- Displacement: 1,595 cc
- Bore: 92 mm
- Stroke: 60 mm
- Compression Ratio: 8.7:1
- Valvetrain: SOHC
- Horsepower: unreleased
- Torque: unreleased

=== EA-81 ===
The Subaru EA-81 engine was produced from 1980 to 1994 and is a stroked version of the "Fat Case" EA-71 it came either with Solid Lifters or Hydraulic Lifters.

==== Found on ====
- 1980–1989 Subaru Leone
- 1981–1994 Subaru BRAT, Subaru Brumby
- 1980–1990 Subaru Hatchback

==== EA-81S ====
This engine used twin Hitachi carburetors on a single intake manifold, and the late version for the 1983 Safari Rally, featured two downdraft Weber Carburetors, each one mounted directly over each head. The Heads and Valvetrain on the EA81S engines are different from the regular counterparts, featuring different positions for the intake and exhaust valves on the Heads, feature known usually as Reverse Valves.

===== Found on =====
- 1980–1982 second gen Subaru Leone (Twin Hitachi Carbs)
- 1980–1982 Second Gen Subaru Brat, Subaru Brumby (Twin Hitachi Carbs).
- 1983 Subaru RX (Safari Rally Edition — Twin Weber Carbs)

==== EA-81T ====
The EA-81T is not an official engine designation from Subaru. The "T" is used informally to refer to the factory turbocharged version of EA-81 engines that are equipped with a turbocharger and multi port fuel injection. Boost pressure was 7 psi (0.48 bar).

===== Found on =====
- 1983–1984 Subaru Leone
- 1983–1984 Subaru BRAT

=== EA-82 ===
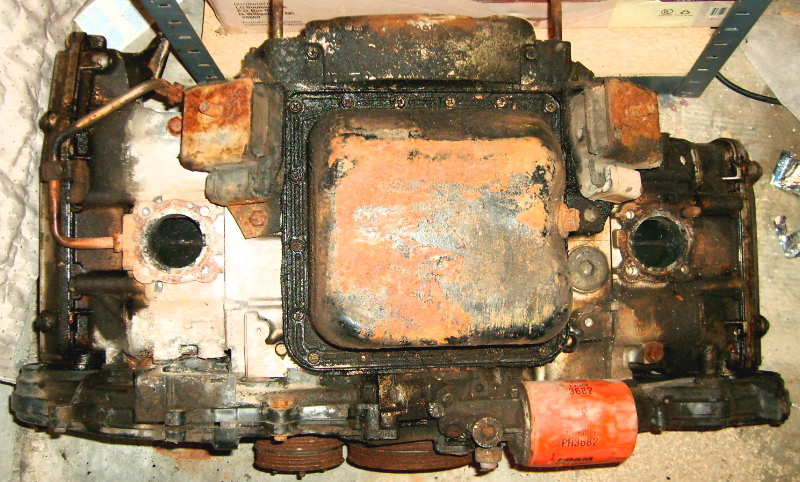
Subaru EA-82 Engine (displayed upside-down)

The Subaru EA-82 engine was originally intended to be a 2.0 L engine as its prototypes were, but Subaru destroked it to 1.8 L for production. The EA82 was produced from 1984 to 1994. It came either with carburetor, single point fuel injection, or multi port fuel injection and hydraulic lifters. Most of the technical advancements introduced to the EA82 were utilized in the next generation Subaru EJ engine, specifically, the SOHC valvetrain, and multi-point fuel injection.

==== Found on ====
- 1984–1994 Third generation of Subaru Leone, Subaru Loyale, Subaru Omega
- 1985–1991 Subaru XT / Alcyone / Vortex

==== EA-82T ====
The EA-82T engine was introduced in 1984 for the Third generation of Subaru Leone in the GL-10 and RX Turbo trim models plus the XT (Vortex), and later on the Subaru Leone RX Coupe models. It is a turbocharged version of the MPFI EA-82 with modified cylinder heads, lower compression pistons, and boost pressure of 7 psi (0.48 bar).

A revised intake known as the "Spider" manifold was available and is seen as an early version of the EJ style intake manifold.

=== ER27 ===
Subaru ER engine

Overview
- Manufacturer: Subaru
- Production: 1988–1991

Layout
- Configuration: flat-6 petrol engine
- Displacement: 2.7 L (2672 cc)
- Cylinder bore: 92 mm
- Piston stroke: 67 mm
- Cylinder block material: aluminium
- Cylinder head material: aluminium
- Valvetrain: SOHC

Combustion
- Fuel type: Petrol/gasoline

Output
- Power output: 112 kW (150 hp)

Chronology
- Successor: Subaru EG engine

The ER series is a flat-6 engine with a displacement of 2.7 L manufactured by Subaru, a division of Fuji Heavy Industries. The ER series has aluminium engine blocks and aluminium cylinder heads. It is found on the 1988–1991 Subaru Alcyone VX (XT-6 in the United States).

Created as a refined luxury engine with improved power over the EA82T, Subaru introduced the ER series engine in 1988 exclusively to be featured in the Subaru Alcyone VX. Like the EA series engines, the ER series engine featured 2-valve cylinder heads with hydraulic lash adjusters and the block shared the same bore and stroke. While recognised as bearing many similarities to the Subaru EA82 engine, there are numerous differences in design between the two engines and a large portion of parts are unique to the ER27. The oil and water pumps are unique to the ER27, sharing similar bolt patterns and design to the EA82, but being of a higher flow in both cases. The intake manifold uses a two-piece design with a lower section bolting to the heads containing the coolant bridge, injectors and various vacuum lines. The upper intake manifold then bolts to the lower section and is unlike the EA82 or EJ22 "spider" manifold designs in that there is no central plenum chamber. The valve timing system is belt-drive using two individual timing belts, curiously one belt uses a spring tensioner (like the EA82) whilst the other uses a hydraulic tensioner (like the EJ22). Both JDM and USDM versions of the ER27 used multi-point electronic fuel injection. The ER27 designation was the first time Subaru incorporated the engine's displacement into the series name and all future engines have retained this nomenclature.
