= American Airmotive =

American Airmotive was founded in Miami, Florida in 1954 to remanufacture surplus military Boeing Stearman trainers as agricultural aircraft, the NA-75. The firm performed these conversions, as well as supplying conversions in kit form.

== Aircraft ==
Summary of aircraft built by American Airmotive
Model name	First flight	Number built	Type
American Airmotive NA-75	1960s	200	Agricultural aircraft
