= Dutch Dakota Association =

Dutch aircraft foundation

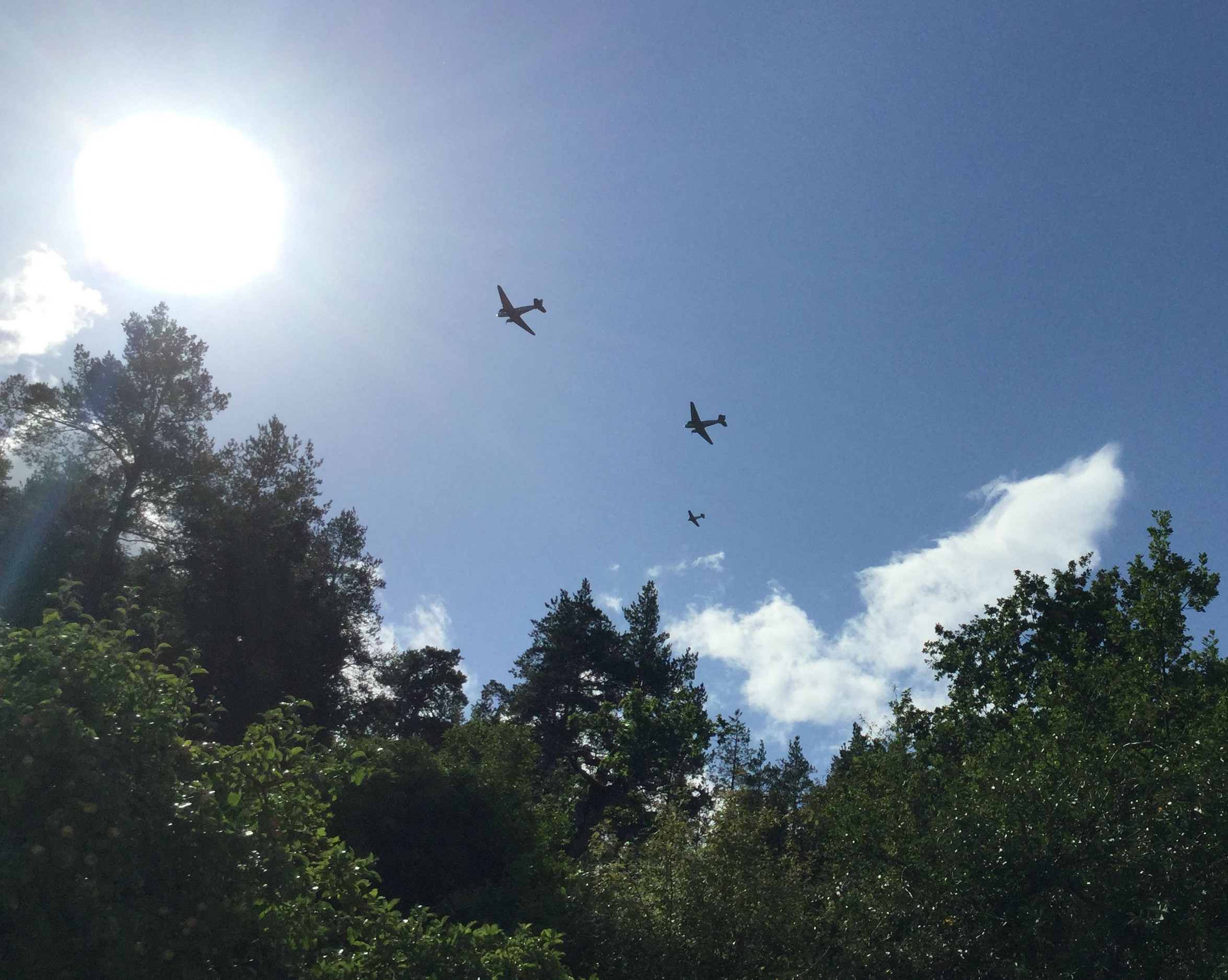
PH-PBA Prinses Amalia and Swedish SE-CFP "Daisy" above Stockholm, 2017

The Dutch Dakota Association or DDA Classic Airlines, known by many just as the DDA, is a small foundation dedicated to the preservation and operation of classic aircraft, especially the Douglas DC-3 Dakota. They are located on the east side of Amsterdam Schiphol Airport in the Netherlands.

== History ==
The DDA was founded in 1982 and acquired its first aircraft, a Douglas DC-3 from Finland, in 1983. A second DC-3 was purchased in 1987 and in 1995 two Douglas DC-4 aircraft were added to the fleet. On 25 September 1996, their first DC-3 aircraft was lost in an accident. In 1998, a former Dutch government aircraft Dakota was donated to the DDA. In 2005, the Dutch Dakota Association changed its name to DDA Classic Airlines.

== Accidents and incidents ==
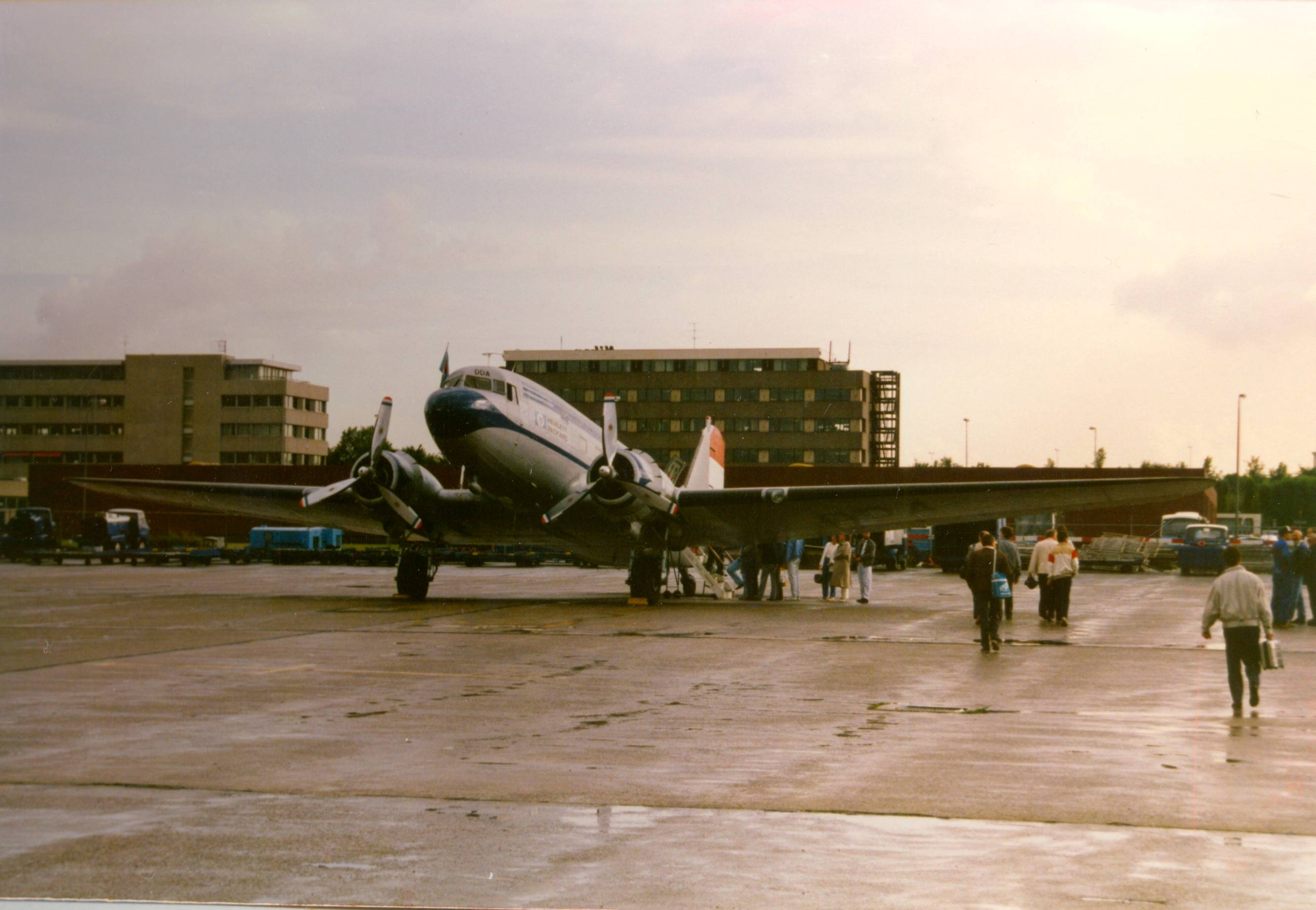
PH-DDA

On 25 September 1996, Douglas DC-3C PH-DDA (ex OH-LCB (Finnair) / DO-7 (Finnish Air Force)) crashed on mudflats in the Wadden Sea 8 nautical miles (15 km) north of Den Oever following an engine failure on a domestic non-scheduled passenger flight from Texel International Airport to Amsterdam Airport Schiphol. The propeller failed to feather and created excessive drag. All 32 people on board were killed. Additional factors in the accident were the crew's lack of proficiency in dealing with emergency situations and a lack of a simulator to practice handling emergencies.

== Current fleet ==
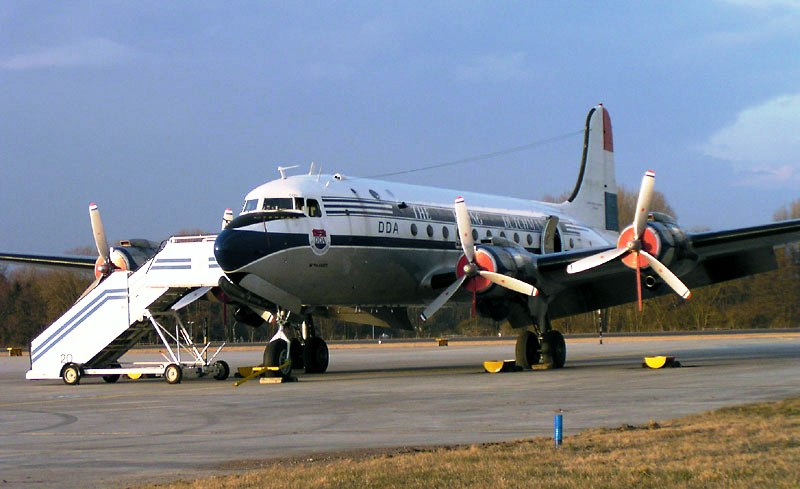
DDA Douglas DC-4

=== Airworthy ===
The following aircraft are owned by the DDA and still airworthy and flying:

- Douglas DC-3 Dakota, registration PH-PBA (former Dutch government aircraft)
- Stinson L-5 Sentinel, registration PH-PBB

=== Not airworthy ===
The following aircraft are owned by the DDA but no longer airworthy:

- Douglas DC-2, last known registration VH-CRH (currently at the Aviodrome museum)
- Douglas DC-4 Skymaster, registration PH-DDY (currently at the Aviodrome museum)

Neither aircraft will be restored to an airworthy condition.

== Operations ==
Flights with the Douglas DC-3 PH-PBA can be booked, which is often making sight seeing flights or short trips to locations or cities both in the Netherlands and abroad. Trips to airshows can also be booked and DDA aircraft are occasionally on display as well. Their single airworthy Douglas DC-4 is currently being leased to SkyClass to provide luxury safari flights in Africa and trips to Europe. They sold the, at this time non airworthy, DC-4 in 2013 to the Dutch The Flying Dutchman Foundation. They are currently looking into restoring the DC-4 in airworthy conditions together with the DDA. The DC-4 is still located in South Africa.

In 2024 the DDA announced that "due to an accumulation of factors" DDA is forced to discontinue sightseeing flights after 2024. Main reasons for this decision are that the lease of the hangar at Schiphol Airport where the PH-PBA is for storage and maintenance has been terminated, the production of AvGas, the fuel on which the Dakota flies, has been banned by the European Commission while adapting the Dakota engines to other kinds of fuel is expected to be very costly if even possible, costs for landings and handling at various airports are rising, and several airports are closing access for the Dakota due to noise and environmental restrictions.
