= CAF Utah Wing Museum =

- "Ghost Squadron"

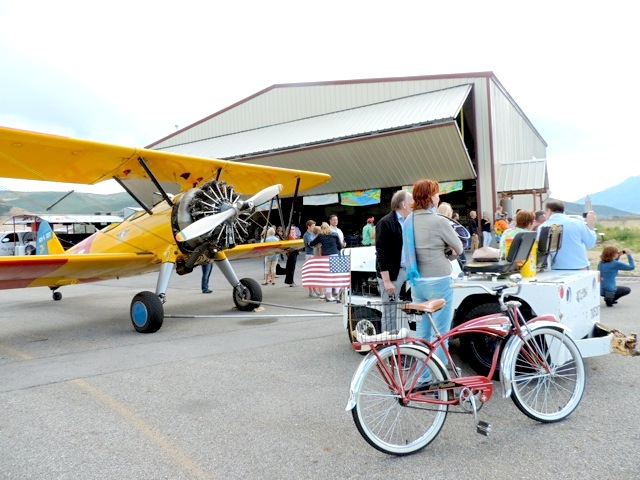
- Commemorative Air Force Utah Wing Museum
- Location: P.O. Box 507; 2365 Airport Road; Russ McDonald Field; Heber City, Utah 84032
- Coordinates: 40.47943°N 111.42907°W
- Type: Aviation museum
- Website: www.cafutahwing.org

CAF Utah Wing Museum is one of many local detachments of the national Commemorative Air Force (CAF) non-profit aviation association dedicated to Honoring American Military Aviation through Flight, Exhibit and Remembrance.

The Museum is located at Russ McDonald Field, Heber City Municipal Airport, Utah, and contains artifacts and exhibits from World War II, Korean, and Vietnam wars. In addition they operate a N2S Stearman aircraft and a T-6 Advanced Trainer aircraft - part of the CAF's fleet of over 170 vintage warbirds. Exhibits and displays preserve stories of local characters that participated in aviation. The Museum is closed, except by special arrangement, from October 31 to May 1 each year.

== Flying aircraft on display ==
=== N2S/PT-17 Stearman History ===
N1387V (s/n 75-8291), an N2S-5 Boeing-Stearman Model 75, was manufactured in 1943 at the Boeing plant in Wichita, Kansas. It was purchased by the U.S. Government to be operated as a trainer by the Navy at Corpus Christi, Texas. After World War II it was sold as surplus and was modified with a larger 450 hp engine for use in crop dusting. It was sold again in the early 1980s and flown as a sport and recreational aircraft. While en route to California the aircraft crashed in the Oquirrh Mountains. The Commemorative Air Force purchased the salvage rights. After significant restoration work at Twin Falls, Idaho, N1387V flew again August 17, 1988. Since then it has been part of the Utah Wing and appears at local airshows and provides rides to the public.

In December, 2015 N1387V underwent a wing restoration with old fabric removed, minor repairs performed, and completed new fabric and paint. N1387V flew during the 2016 season. Starting in 2017 an extensive restoration of the engine, fuselage and empennage was initiated and as of May 2026 that work is still underway.

=== SNJ/T-6 Texan ===
A Texan trainer is on display in the museum hangar. This aircraft is privately owned by a group of Utah wing members and regularly performs vintage aircraft flyovers in the wider local area. The Texan was the advanced training aircraft used for formation, gunnery and tactics training in WW II.

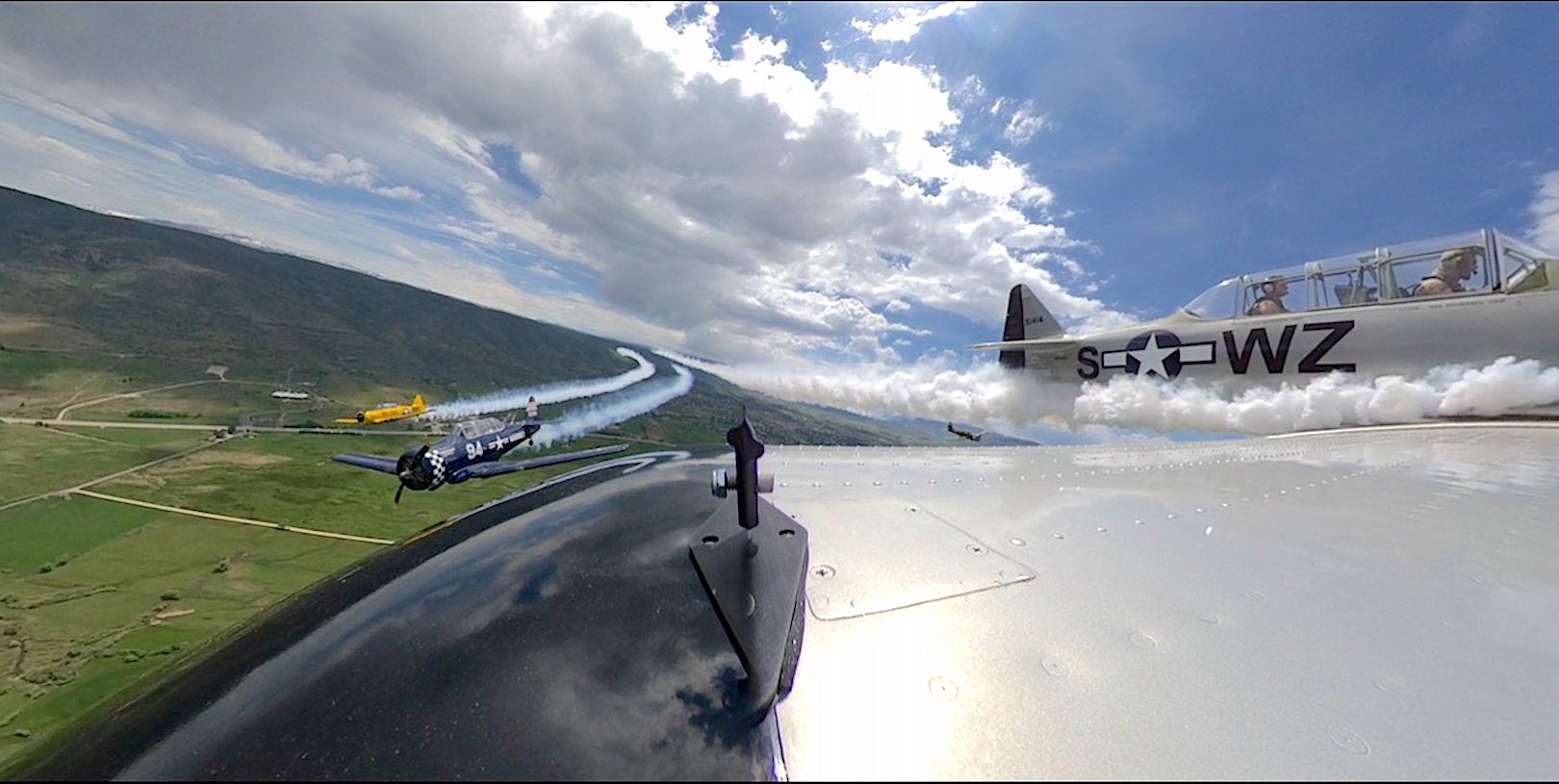
3 Texans perform a Memorial Day Flyover of the Wasatch Front

== Character exhibits ==
- Russ McDonald: Founder of the Heber City, Utah airport.
- Ike Isaacs: B-17 bomber pilot, 34th Bomb Group, 391st Squadron.
- Jackson Wells: B-17 bomber pilot, 8th air force, 306th Bomb Group, 367th Squadron flying missions over Germany.
- Emmett "Cyclone" Davis: Fighter pilot stationed at Pearl Harbor during the Japanese attack; later commander of the 35th Fighter Squadron in the Pacific.
- Burnis Watts: Waco CG-4 glider pilot who participated in the Invasion of Normandy, Holland Invasion (Operation Varsity) and the Crossing of the Rhine.
- Raymond Brim: B-17 bomber pilot and Pathfinder pioneer, 8th air force, 92nd Bomb Group, flying missions over France and Germany.
- Herbert Rostoff: B-17 Bombardier, Joined the 483rd Bombardment Group, shot down in Germany July 1944 and held POW until January 1945.

== See also ==
- List of aerospace museums
