= American Airmotive NA-75 =

NA-75

General information
- Type: Agricultural aircraft
- Manufacturer: American Airmotive
- Number built: >200

The American Airmotive NA-75 was an agricultural aircraft marketed in the United States in the 1960s, created by remanufacturing military surplus Boeing Stearman trainers. The aircraft were fitted with completely new, high-lift wings, and one of the cockpits was replaced by a chemical hopper. As of 1980, over 200 Stearmans had been modified in this way, either by American Airmotive directly, or via conversion kits that the company sold.

== Specifications ==
Data from Jane's All The World's Aircraft 1965-66

General characteristics

- Crew: 1
- Capacity:
  - 31.7 ft^{3} (0.90 m^{3}) hopper
  - >2,000 lb (910 kg) payload
- Length: 24 ft 9 in (7.54 m)
- Upper wingspan: 33 ft 0 1/2 in (10.071 m)
- Lower wingspan: 29 ft 5 in (8.97 m)
- Wing area: 338.26 sq ft (31.425 m^{2})
- Airfoil: Gottingen 398
- Max takeoff weight: 4,612 lb (2,092 kg)
- Powerplant: 1 × Pratt & Whitney R-985 radial engine, 450 hp (340 kW)

Performance

- Stall speed: 55 mph (89 km/h, 48 kn) with 1,250 lb (570 kg) payload
- Rate of climb: 1,100 ft/min (5.6 m/s)
