= Boeing-Stearman Model 75 =

American biplane military training aircraft in use 1934 through WWII

Model 75 (Stearman Kaydet)
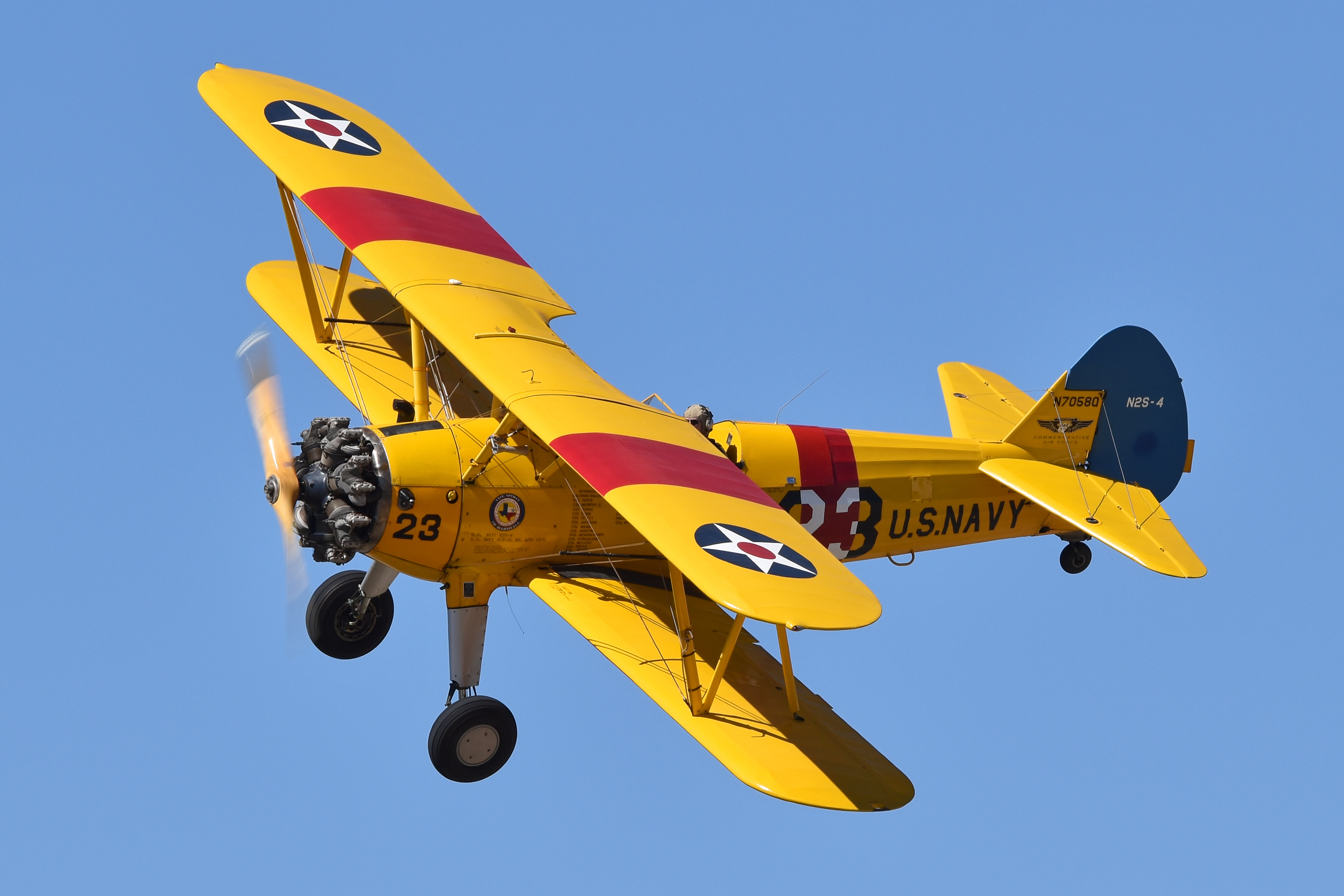
- Boeing Stearman N7058Q in U.S. Navy markings

General information
- Type: Biplane trainer
- Manufacturer: Stearman Aircraft / Boeing
- Number built: 10,626 (includes model 70, 75 and 76)

History
- Introduction date: 1934
- Variant: American Airmotive NA-75

The Stearman (Boeing) Model 75 is an American biplane formerly used as a military trainer aircraft, of which at least 10,626 were built in the United States during the 1930s and 1940s. Stearman Aircraft became a subsidiary of Boeing in 1934. Widely known as the Stearman, Boeing Stearman, or Kaydet, it served as a primary trainer for the United States Army Air Forces, the United States Navy (as the NS and N2S), and with the Royal Canadian Air Force as the Kaydet throughout World War II. After the conflict was over, thousands of surplus aircraft were sold on the civilian market. In the immediate postwar years, they became popular as crop dusters and sports planes, and for aerobatic and wing walking use in air shows.

== Design and development ==
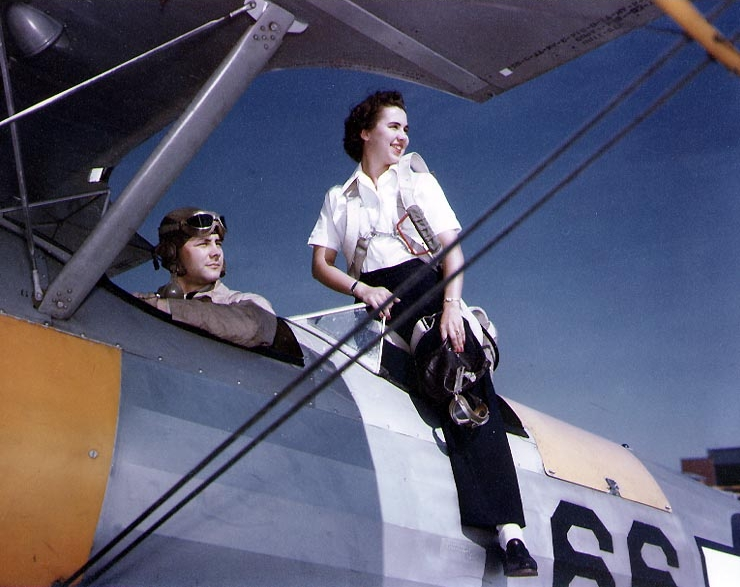
A WAVE in a Boeing Stearman N2S United States Navy training aircraft

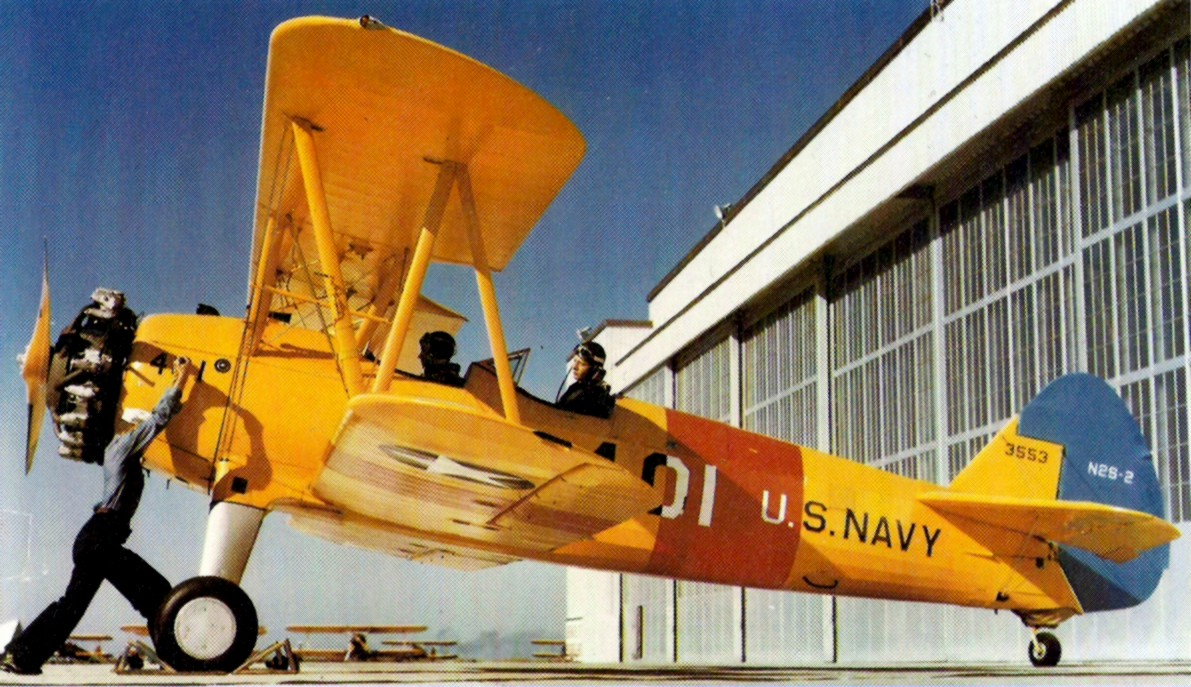
United States Navy N2S-2 at NAS Corpus Christi, 1943

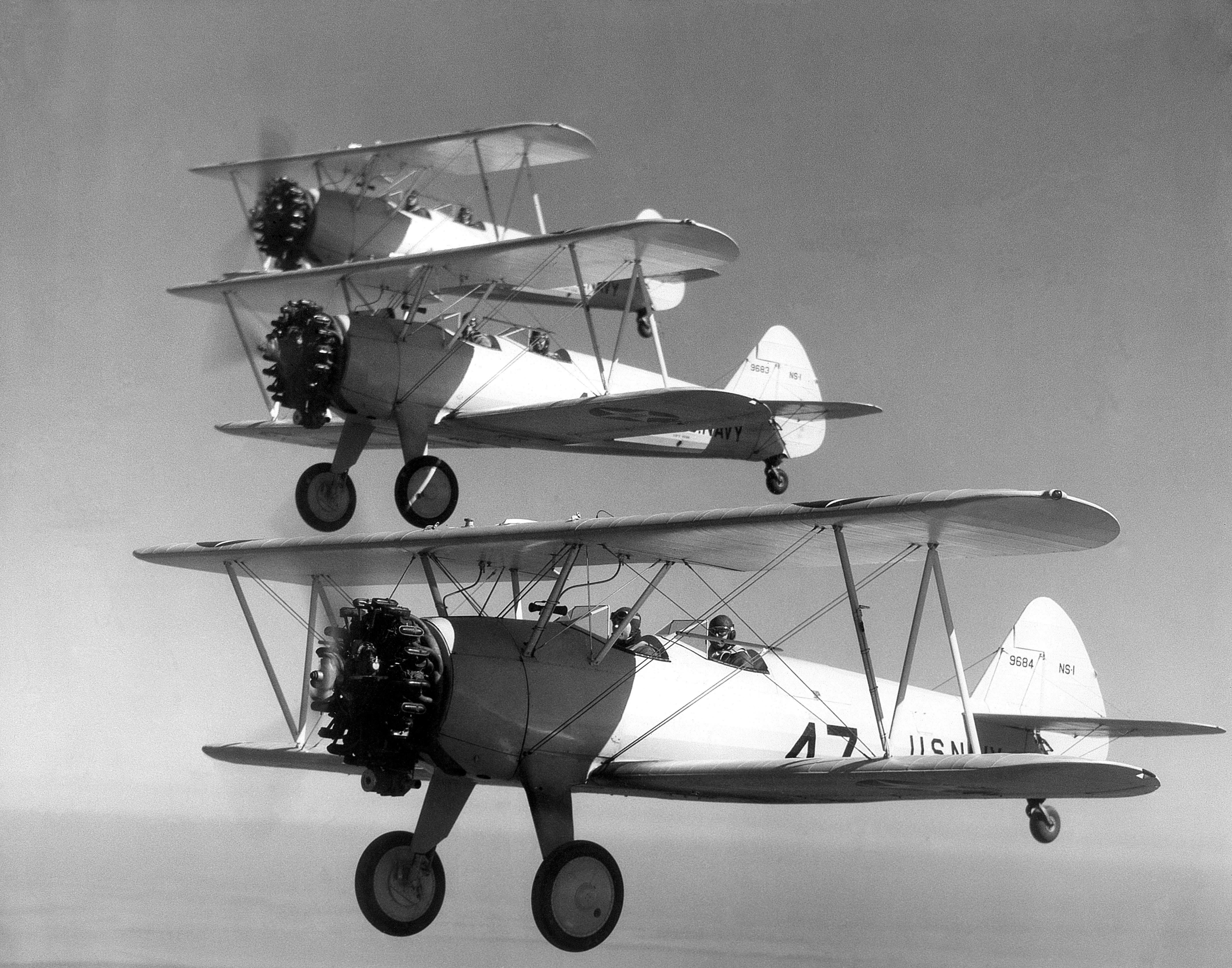
United States Navy NS-1s of the NAS Pensacola Flight School, 1936

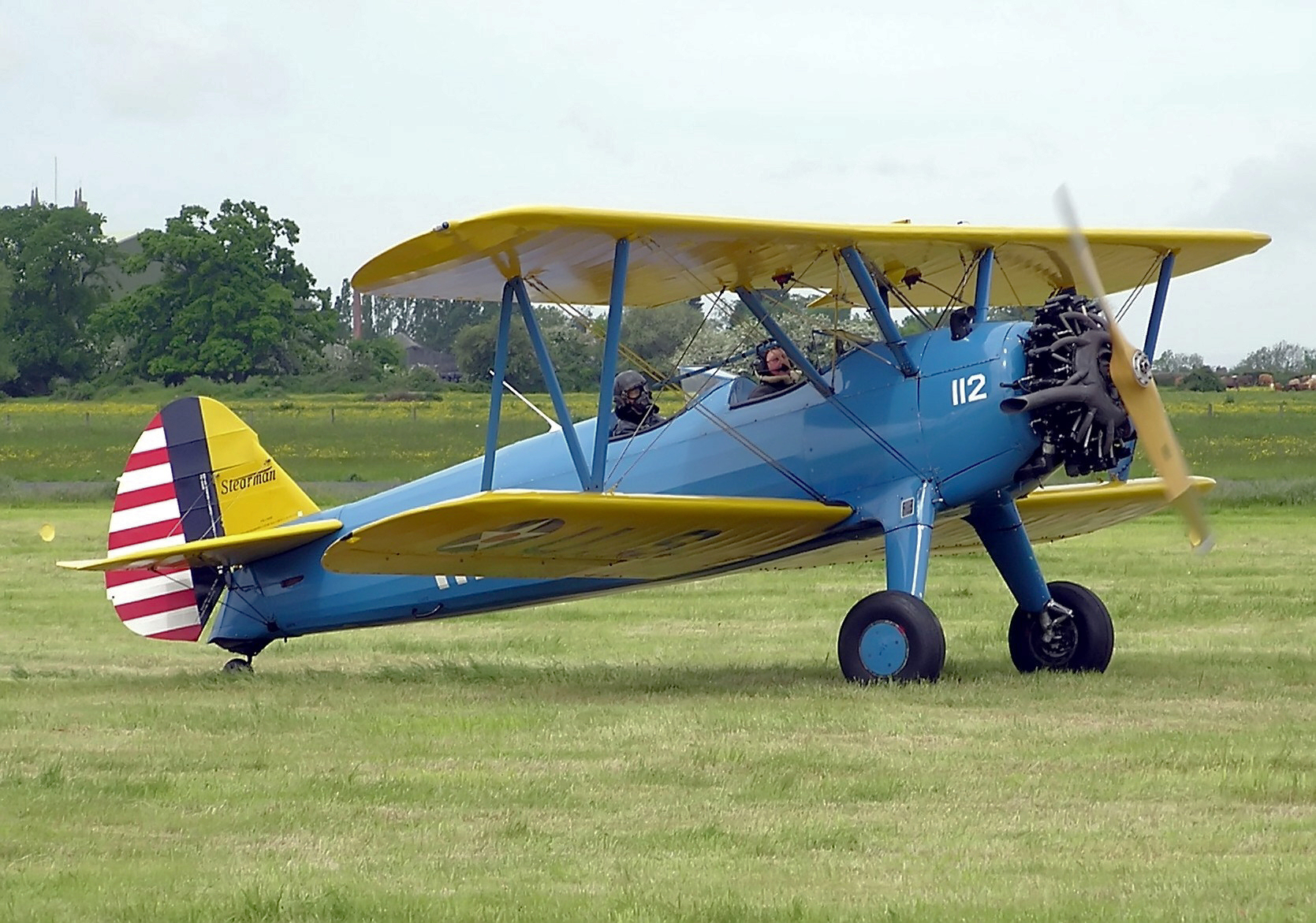
Boeing Stearman E75 (PT-13D) of 1944

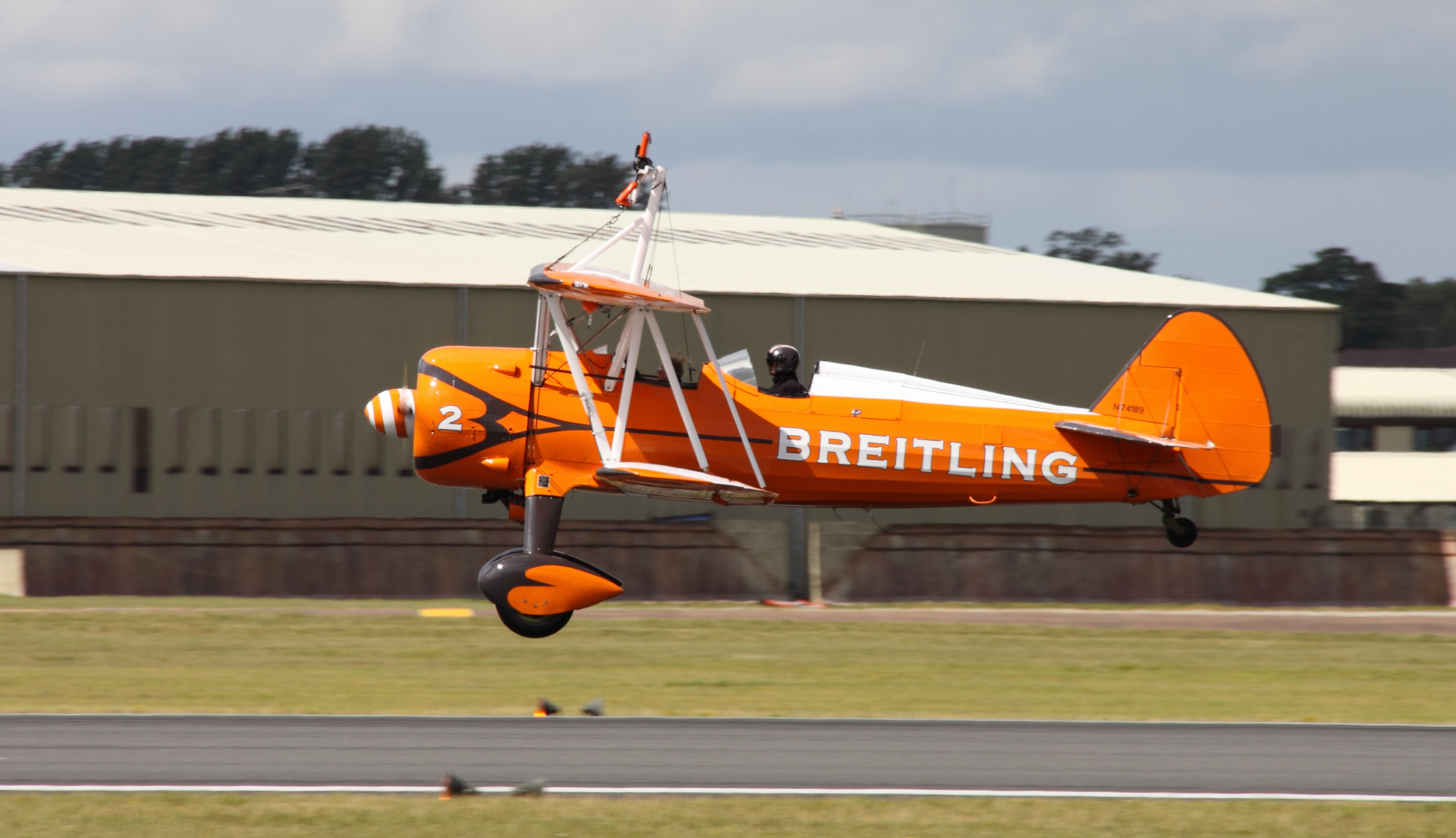
Vintage Boeing-Stearman Model 75, Breitling SA

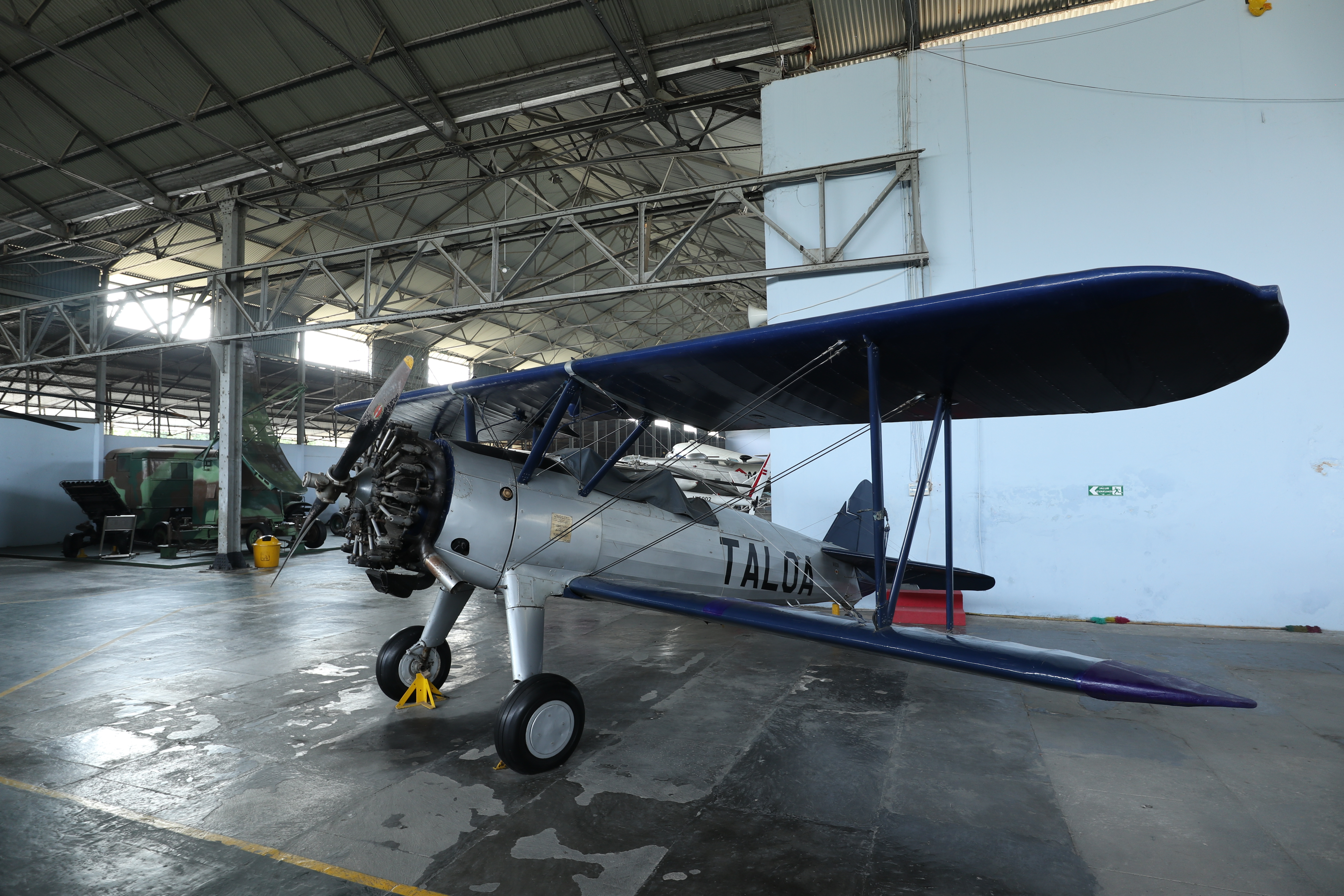
Boeing Stearman (PT-13D) of the TALOA in Dirgantara Mandala Museum, Indonesia

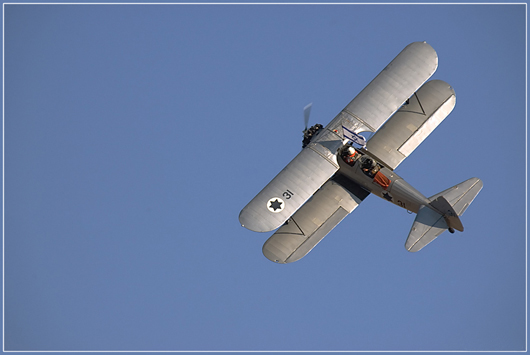
Boeing Stearman (PT-13) of the Israeli Air Force

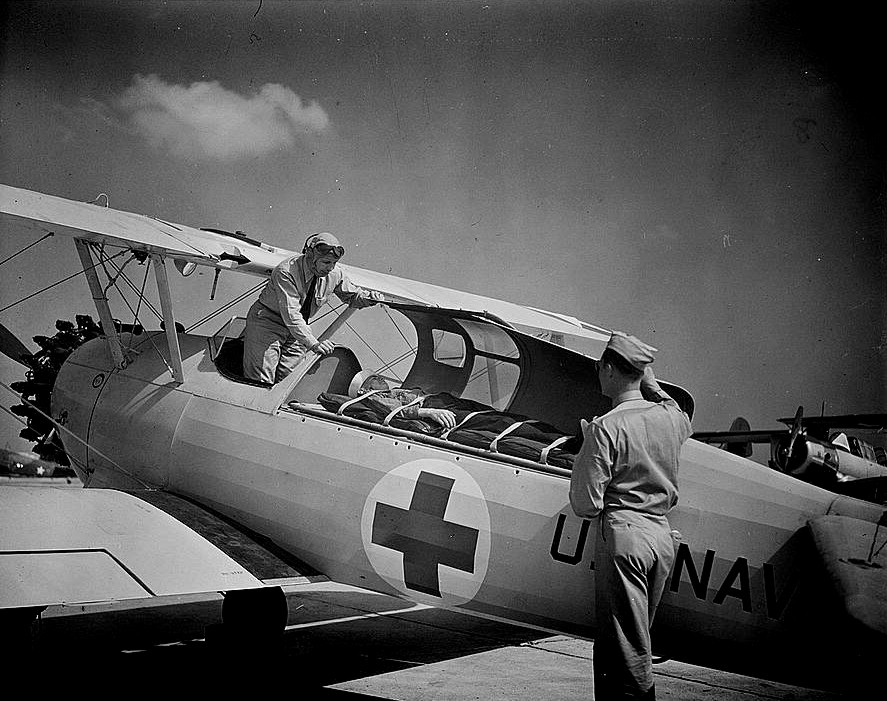
United States Navy N2S ambulance at NAS Corpus Christi, 1942

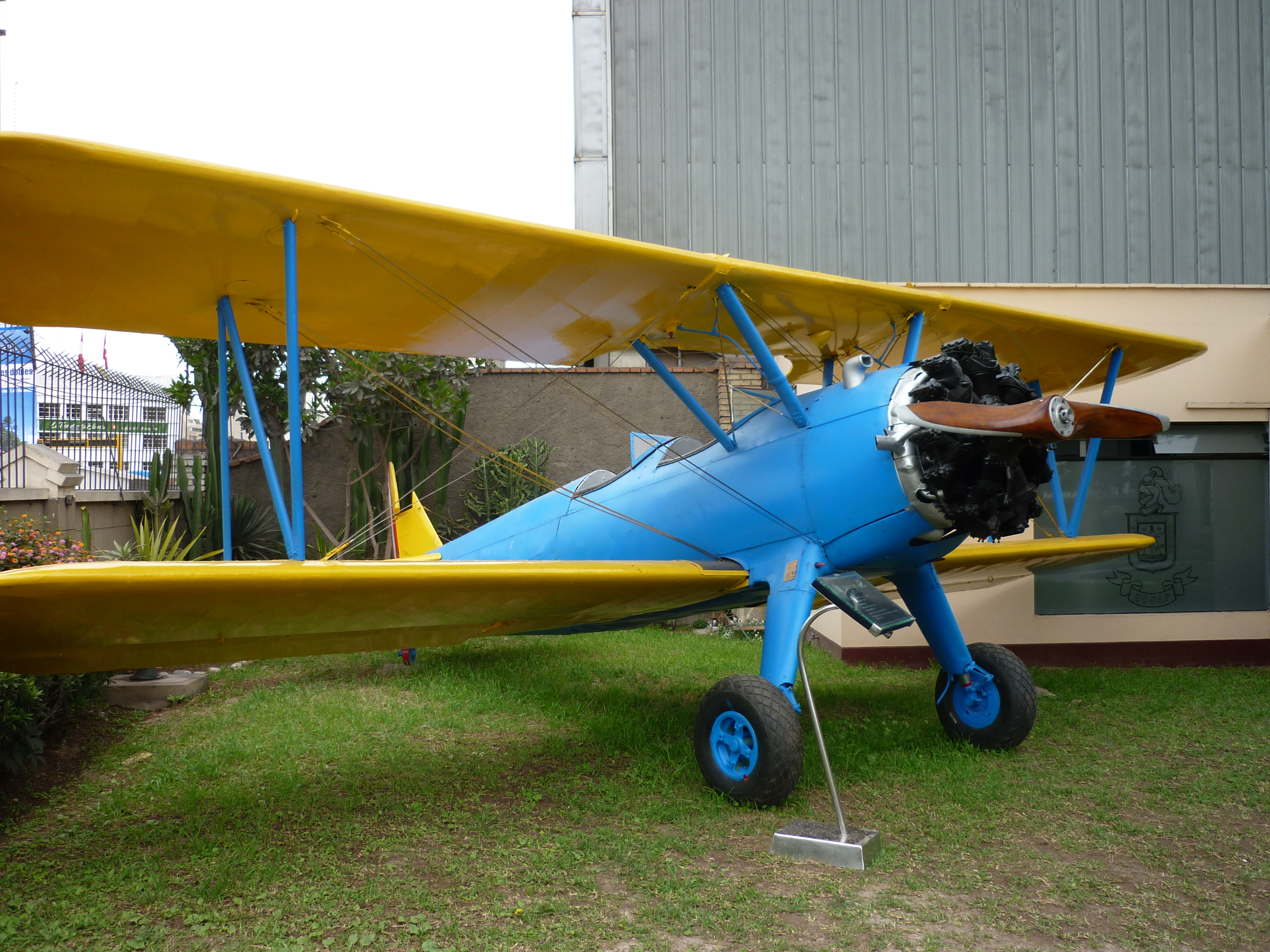
Boeing Stearman PT-17, Museum of Historical Studies Institute of Aerospace in Perú – Lima

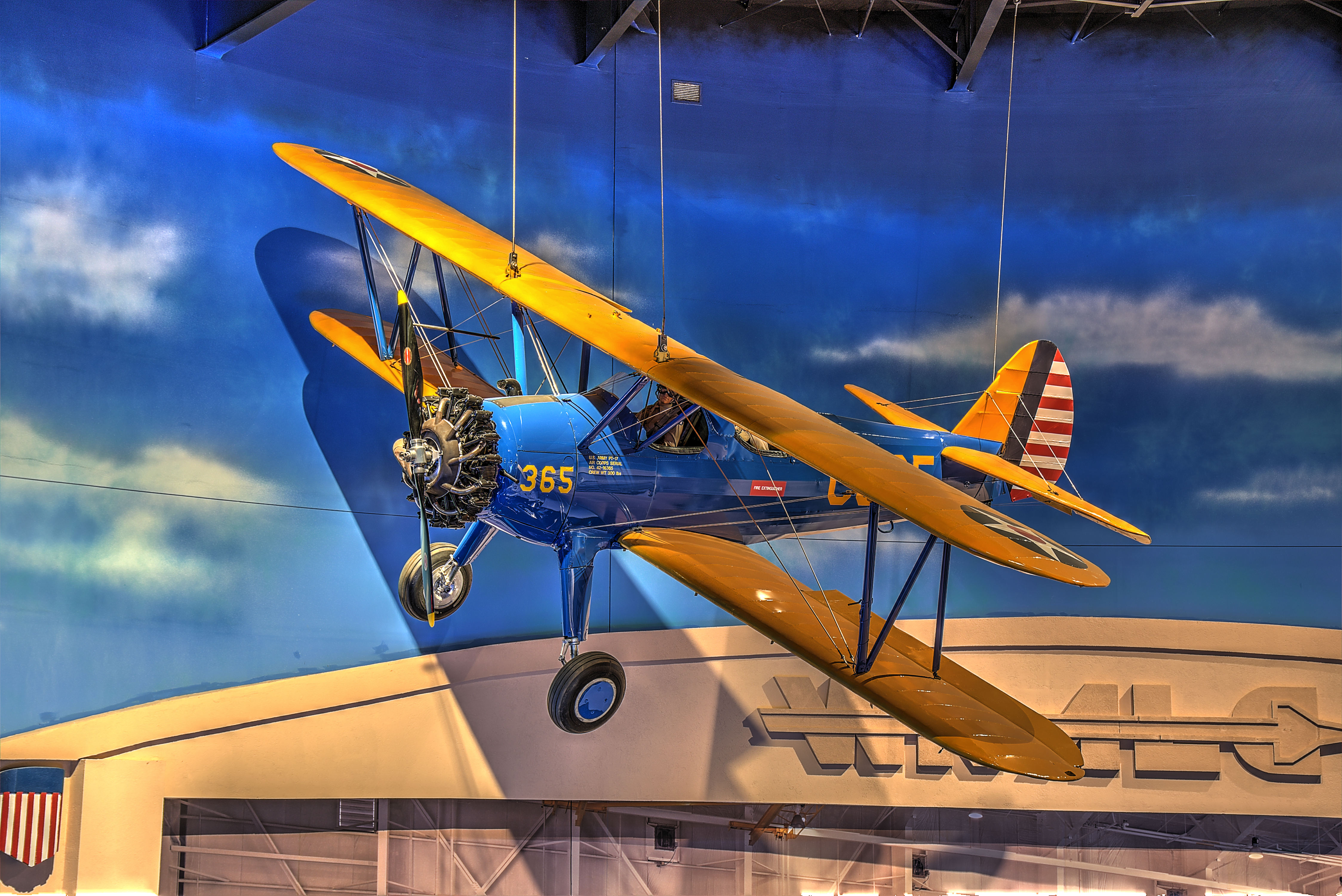
PT-17 "Kaydet" on display at the Museum of Aviation, Robins AFB

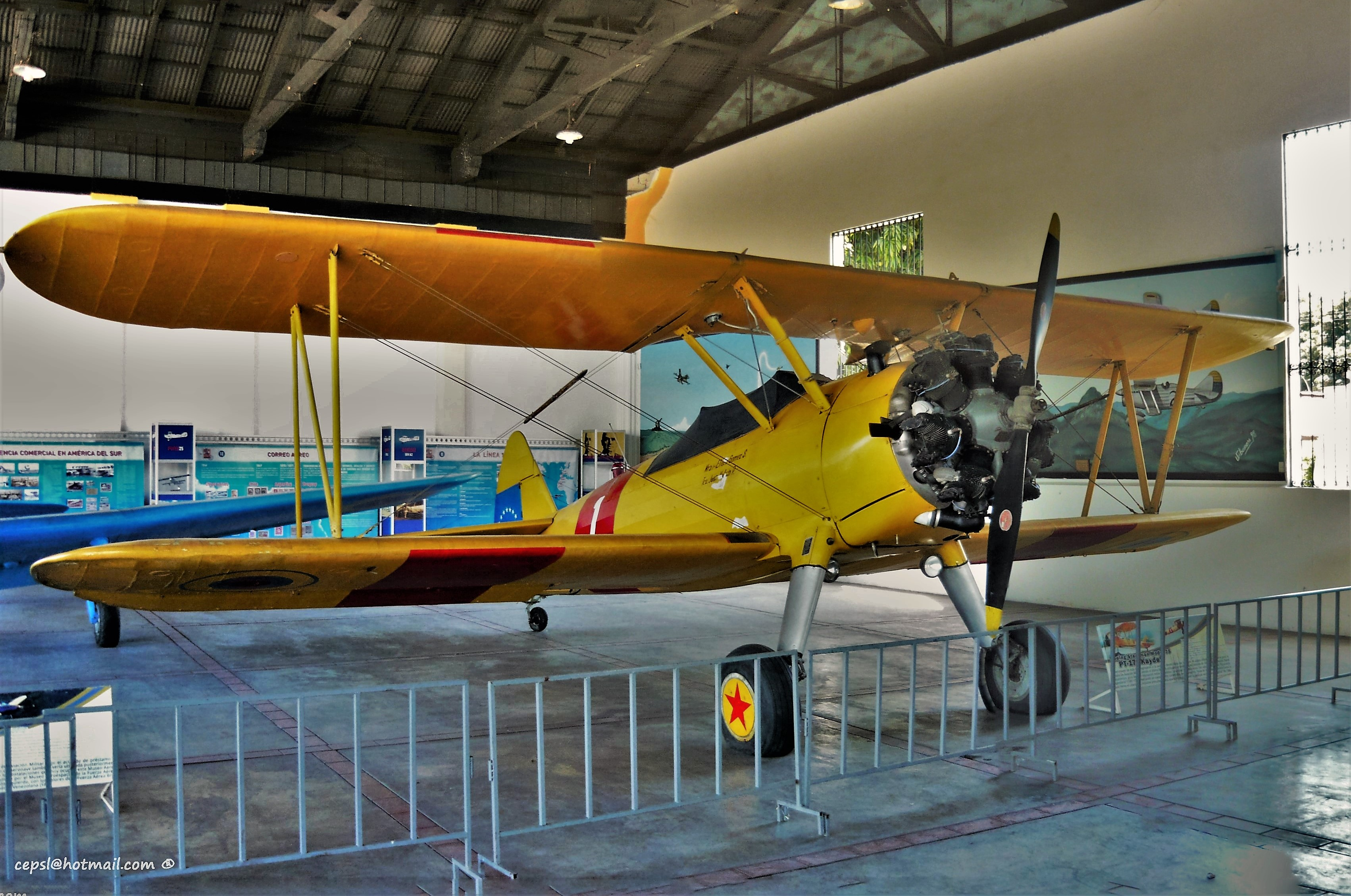
Boeing Stearman PT-17 Kaydet – Aeronautics Museum of Maracay

In late 1933, Stearman engineers Mac Short, Harold W. Zipp, and J. Jack Clark took a 1931 Lloyd Stearman design, and added cantilever landing gear and adjustable elevator trim tabs, to produce the Model 70. Able to withstand +12g and -9g, the aircraft was powered by a 210-hp Lycoming R-680, first flew on 1 January 1934, before flight tests were conducted at Wright Field, Naval Air Station Anacostia, and Pensacola. The Navy then requested a similar model built to Navy specifications, including a 200-hp Wright J-5 engine. The resultant Model 73, was designated NS-1 by the Navy, of which 41 were ordered, including enough spares to build another 20 aircraft.

In the summer of 1934, Stearman engineers refined the Model 73 into the Model X75. The Army Air Corps evaluated the plane that autumn, powered by a 225-hp Wright R-760 or a 225-hp Lycoming R-680. In July 1935, the Army Air Corps ordered 26 with the Lycoming engine, designated the PT-13A, while the navy ordered an additional 20. In August 1936, the Army ordered an additional 50 PT-13As, followed by another 30 in October, and another 28 in December. Simultaneously, the company received orders for its primary trainer from the Argentinian navy, the Philippine Army Air Corps, and the Brazilian Air Force. In January 1937, the army ordered another 26 PT-13As.

On 6 June 1941, the U.S. government issued Approved Type Certificate No. 743 for the civilian version of the Model 75. Designated the Model A75L3 (PT-13) and Model A75N1 (PT-17), about 60 were sold to civilian flights schools such as Parks College of Engineering, Aviation and Technology, and for export.

On 15 March 1941, the company delivered the 1000th trainer to the Army, and the 1001st trainer to the Navy. Then on 27 August 1941, the company delivered the 2000th trainer to the Army. On 27 July 1944, the company delivered its 10,000th primary trainer.

The Kaydet was a conventional biplane of rugged construction, with a large, fixed tailwheel undercarriage, and accommodation for the student and instructor in open cockpits in tandem. The radial engine was usually not cowled, although some Stearman operators choose to cowl the engine, most notably the Red Baron Stearman Squadron.

== Operational history ==
=== Post-war usage ===
After World War II, thousands of surplus PT-17s were auctioned off to civilians and former military pilots. Many were modified for crop-dusting use, with a hopper for pesticide or fertilizer fitted in place of the front cockpit. Additional equipment included pumps, spray bars, and nozzles mounted below the lower wings. A popular approved modification to increase the maximum takeoff weight and climb performance involved fitting a larger Pratt & Whitney R-985 Wasp Junior engine and a constant-speed propeller.

== Variants ==
Data from: United States Navy aircraft since 1911, Boeing aircraft since 1916 8,584 Model 70s, 75s and 76s were built, with additional "spares" bringing the number up to the sometimes quoted 10,346.

=== USAAC/USAAF designations ===
The U.S. Army Air Forces Model 75 Kaydet had three different designations, PT-13, PT-17 and PT-18, depending on which type of radial engine was installed.

PT-13
Initial production version with Lycoming R-680-B4B engine, 26 built in 1936

PT-13A Model A75 with R-680-7 engine, 92 delivered from 1937 to 1938.
PT-13B R-680-11 engine, 255 delivered from 1939 to 1941.
PT-13C Six PT-13Bs modified for instrument flying.
PT-13D Model E75 with R-680-17 engine, 793 delivered

PT-17
Version with Continental R-670-5 engine, 2,942 delivered.

PT-17A 136 PT-17s modified with blind-flying instrumentation.
PT-17B Three PT-17s modified with agricultural spraying equipment for pest control near army bases.
PT-17C Single PT-17 conversion with standardized Army-Navy equipment.

PT-18
Version with Jacobs R-755-7 engine, 150 built. Further production was cancelled as the engines were needed for other types of trainers.

PT-18A Six PT-18s modified with blind-flying instrumentation.

PT-27
USAAF paperwork designation given to 300 D75N1/PT-17 aircraft supplied under Lend-Lease to the Royal Canadian Air Force. The last example built, FK108, had a canopy installed. (Note: However, extensive publication of pictures of this airframe resulted in the misconception that all PT-27s had canopies.)

=== US Navy designations ===
NS
Up to 61 Model 73B1 delivered, powered by 220 hp (160 kW) Wright J-5/R-790 Whirlwind radials
N2S
Known colloquially as the "Yellow Peril" from its overall yellow paint scheme.

N2S-1 Model A75N1 with Continental R-670-14 engine, 250 delivered.
N2S-2 Model B75 with Lycoming R-680-8 engine, 125 delivered in 1941.
N2S-3 Model B75N1 with Continental R-670-4 engine, 1,875 delivered.
N2S-4 Model A75N1 with Continental R-670-4 and -5 engines, 457 delivered of 579 ordered, including 99 PT-17s diverted from U.S. Army orders.
N2S-5 Model E75 with Lycoming R-680-17 engine, 1,450 delivered.

=== Company designations ===
Stearman 70
Company designation for prototype, powered by 215 hp (160 kW) Lycoming radial engine, designated XPT-943 for evaluation
Model 73
Initial production version, 61 built for U.S. Navy as NS plus export variants
Model 73L3 - Version for the Philippines, powered by 200 hp (150 kW) R-680-4 or R-680C1 engines, seven built
Model A73B1 - Seven aircraft for Cuban Air Force powered by 235 hp (175 kW) Wright R-790 Whirlwind, delivered 1939–1940
Model A73L3 - Improved version for the Philippines, three built
Stearman 75
(or X75) Evaluated by the U.S. Army as a primary trainer, the X75L3 became the PT-13 prototype. Variants of the 75 formed the PT-17 family.
Stearman 76
Export trainer and armed version of the 75 with a gun ring and one or two fixed forward firing machine guns.
A76B4 - 5 built for Venezuela.
A76C3 - 15 built for Brazil.
B76C3 - 15 built with cameras for Brazil.
76D1 - 16 built for Argentina and three for Philippines as BT-1.
S76D1 - seaplane version of 76D1 for Argentina
76D3 - 24 built for Philippine Constabulary as BT-1 armed advanced trainer, and 24 built for Cuba.

=== Other designations ===
Stearman XPT-943
Designation assigned to the X70 evaluated at Wright Field

Stearman Kaydet
Name used for aircraft in Royal Canadian Air Force service

American Airmotive NA-75
Single-seat agricultural conversion of Model 75, fitted with new, high-lift wings

== Operators ==
Argentina

- Argentine Air Force
- Argentine Navy received 16 Model 76D1s 1936 to 1937 and 60 N2S Kaydet post-war; all were retired by the early 1960s

Bolivia

- Bolivian Air Force

Brazil
Brazilian Air Force Model A75L3 and 76.
Canada
Royal Canadian Air Force received 301 PT-27s under Lend Lease.
Republic of China
Republic of China Air Force received 150 PT-17s under Lend-Lease, and 104 refurbished aircraft post war in Taiwan. The ROCAF used them until 1958.
Colombia
Colombian Air Force
Cuba

- Cuban Air Force

Dominican Republic

- Dominican Air Force

Greece

- Hellenic Air Force

Guatemala

- Guatemalan Air Force

Honduras

- Honduran Air Force

Iran
Imperial Iranian Air Force
Israel
Israeli Air Force purchased 20 PT-17s.
Mexico
Mexican Air Force
Nicaragua
Nicaraguan Air Force
Paraguay
Paraguayan Air Force
Peru
Peruvian Air Force
Philippines
Philippine Constabulary Aviation Unit
Philippine Army Air Corps
Philippine Air Force
United States
United States Army Air Corps/United States Army Air Forces
United States Marine Corps
United States Navy
Venezuela
Venezuelan Air Force
Yugoslavia
Yugoslav Air Force

== Surviving aircraft ==
A considerable number of Stearmans remain in flying condition throughout the world, as the type remains a popular sport plane and warbird.

=== Argentina ===
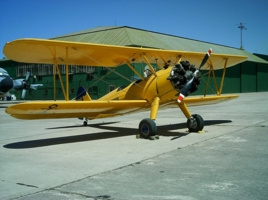
Argentine Naval Aviation N2S-5 preserved in flight condititon

- 308 – N2S-5 airworthy at the Argentine Naval Aviation Museum in Bahía Blanca, Buenos Aires.

=== Australia ===
- 75-6488 – B75N1 registered as VH-EYC, airworthy, owned by Steven Bradley, South Australia 5134
- 75-7462 - B75N1 - registered as VH-PWS, airworthy, owned by Michael Murphy, Royal Aero Club of Victoria.
- 75-8314 – E75 Registered as VH-USE, airworthy, owned by Raalin, Western Australia 6208

=== Austria ===
- 75-2606 – PT-17 Registered as OE-CBM, airworthy, Austrian Aviation Museum, Vöslau
- 75-230 - PT-13B Registered as OE-ABS, airworthy, Austrian Aviation Museum, Vöslau
- 75-5032 – PT-17 Registered as OE-AMM, airworthy at Hangar-7, Salzburg

=== Brazil ===
- K-132 – A75L3 on display at the Museu Aeroespacial in Rio de Janeiro
- K-210 – A76C3 on display at the Museu Aeroespacial in Rio de Janeiro
- 38010 – N2S-3 on display at the Museu Aeroespacial Paulista in São Paulo. Previously displayed at the Museu Asas de um Sonho.

=== Canada ===
- 41-8621 – PT-17 airworthy at the Canadian Warplane Heritage Museum in Hamilton, Ontario.
- 42-17456 – PT-13D owned by Daniel Jones of Lacombe, Alberta.
- 5284 – N2S-3 under restoration to airworthy with Daniel Jones of Lacombe, Alberta
- 5293 – N2S-3 owned by J. Kurtin of Collingwood, Ontario
- 30083 – N2S-4 on display at the Reynolds-Alberta Museum in Wetaskiwin, Alberta
- 61105 – N2S-5 with Bruce Bond of Sarnia, Ontario
- 75-3498 – PT-17 airworthy owned by Great River Aviation Ltd. of Whitehorse, Yukon o/a Klondike Airways.
- PT-17 airworthy at the Canadian Aviation Museum in Windsor, Ontario.

=== Colombia ===
- FAC-62 – PT-17 airworthy
- FAC-1995 – PT-17 airworthy

=== Czech Republic ===
- 75-3125 – former RCAF PT-27 airworthy at Tocna airport

=== Iceland ===
- T5-1556 – PT-17 airworthy As of 2020 with Erling Pétur Erlingsson in Hafnarfjörður, Capital Region. It is the oldest airplane in Iceland. It was brought to the country in 1941 by the aircraft carrier USS Wasp and damaged in an accident in 1943.

=== Indonesia ===
- PT-13D is on display at Dirgantara Mandala Museum in Yogyakarta. The aircraft is painted in Taloa Academy of Aeronautics livery.

=== Israel ===
- 2752 – PT-17 is airworthy at the Israeli Air Force Museum in Hatzerim.

=== Mexico ===
- EPS-6084 – PT-17 on static display at the Museo Militar de Aviación in Santa Lucía, Zumpango.

=== Netherlands ===
- 75-7027 – PT-13B is airworthy, registered as PH-TOX, owned by Joe Brewer and based at Oostwold Airport.
- 75-7213 – N2S-3 is airworthy, registered as N9912H, owned by the Nordsiek family and based at Breda International Airport.
- 75-5864 – PT-13D Kaydet is airworthy, registered as N1944S based at Texel International Airport

=== New Zealand ===
- 75-647 – PT-17 airworthy with R. J. S. Jenkins in Ardmore, Auckland.
- 75-2055 – PT-17 airworthy with R. B. Mackley in Milford.
- 75-2100 – PT-17 airworthy with Classic Aircraft Sales Limited in Blenheim.
- 75-2724 – PT-17 airworthy with B. L. Govenlock in Hastings.
- 75-3132 – PT-17 airworthy with the Antonievich Family Trust in Pukekohe.
- 75-3655 – PT-17 airworthy with M. P. Cantlon in Mount Maunganui.
- 75-4245 – PT-17 airworthy with the Strome Farm Trust in Drury.
- 75-5064 – PT-13D airworthy with the Stearman Syndicate in Drury.
- 75-5907 – PT-13D airworthy with Stearman 03 Limited in Mount Maunganui.
- 75-8025A – N2S-3 airworthy with M. J. Dean in Mount Maunganui.

=== Peru ===
- PT-17 is on display at the Instituto de Estudios Históricos Aeroespaciales del Perú, Miraflores, Lima.

=== Spain ===
- PT-13 on display at the Fundación Infante de Orleans in Cuatro Vientos, Madrid.
- PT-17 on display at the Fundación Infante de Orleans in Cuatro Vientos, Madrid.

=== Switzerland ===
- 75-5436 – PT-13D is airworthy, registered as HB-RBG, and based at the Fliegermuseum Altenrhein. Built in 1943 and restored to airworthiness in 1989 after sustaining considerable damage during an emergency landing in the grounds of the Stadler Rail factory in Altenrhein due to engine failure.

=== Taiwan ===
- PT-17 is on static display at the Aviation Education Exhibition Hall in Gangshan District, Kaohsiung City.

=== United States ===
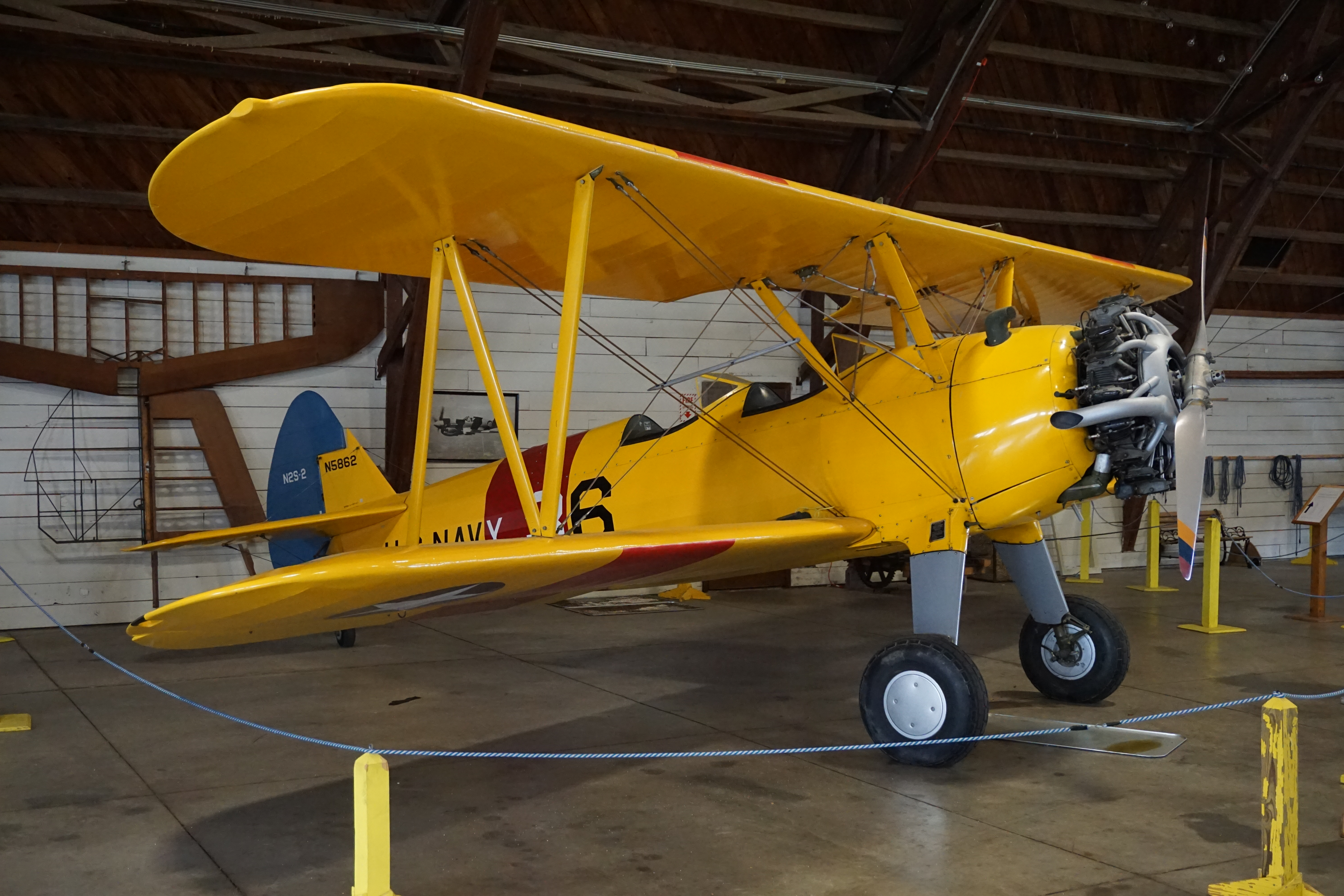
Boeing-Stearman NS2-S at the Arkansas Air & Military Museum in Fayetteville, Arkansas

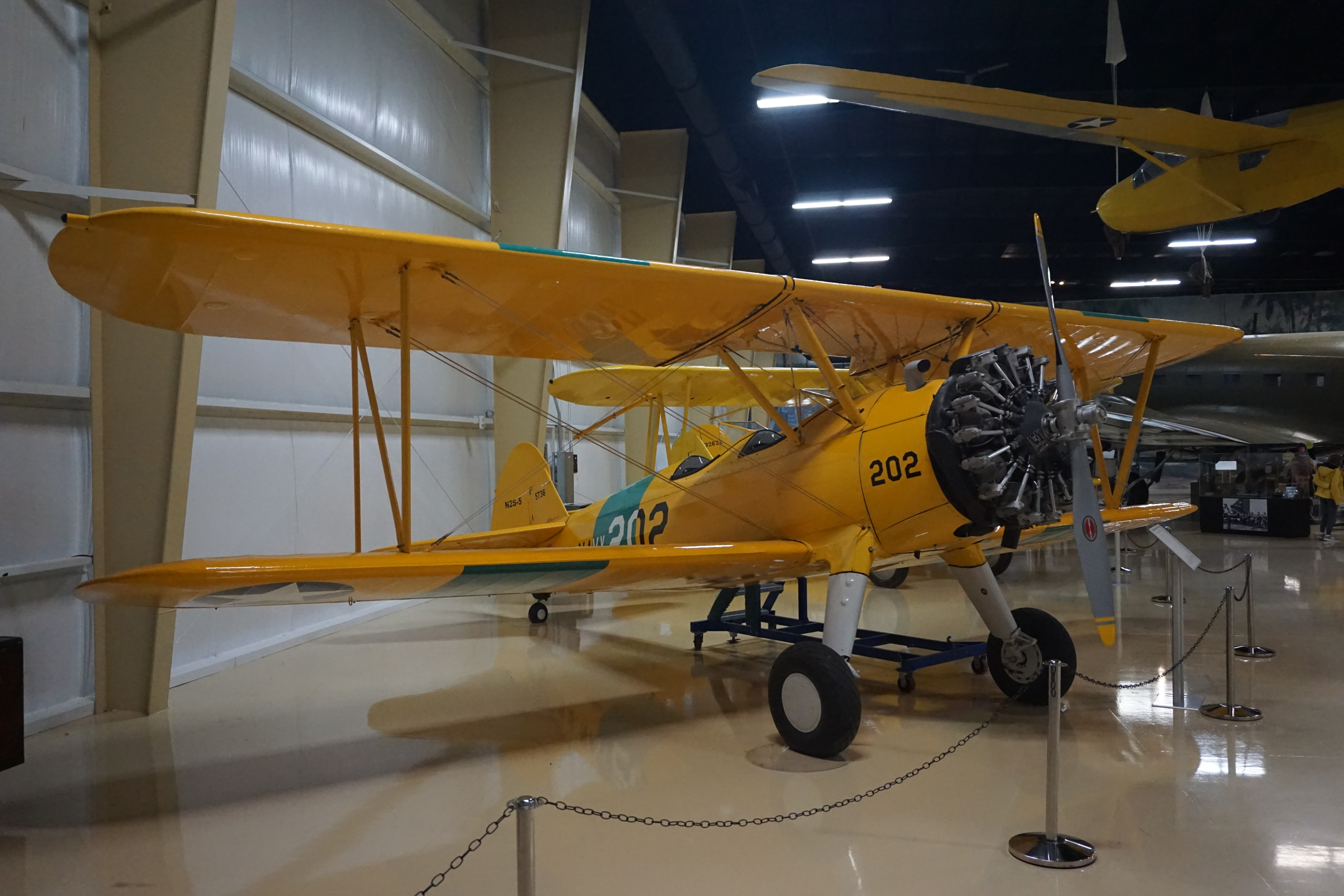
Boeing-Stearman Kaydet at the Air Zoo

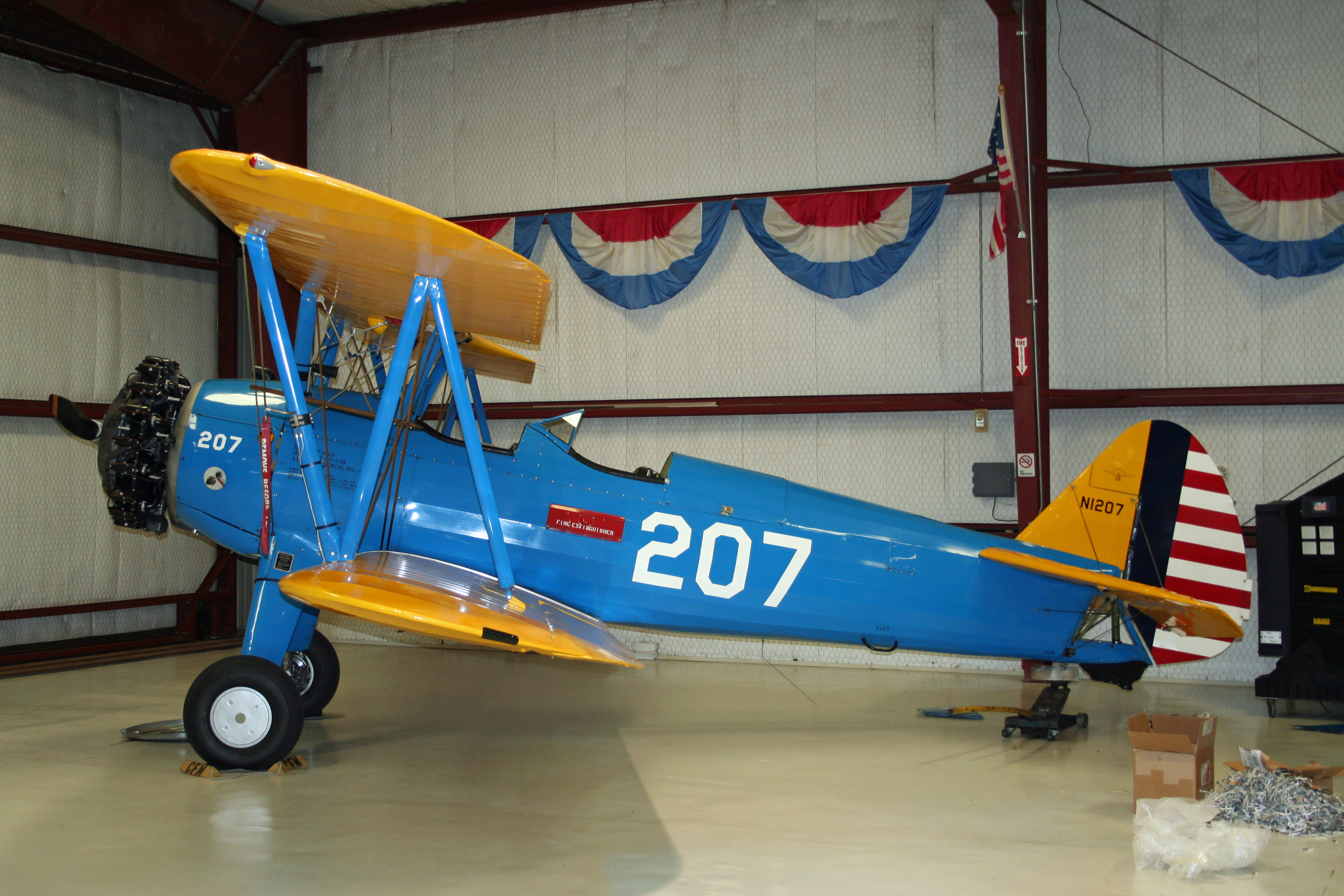
Boeing Stearman at the Cavanaugh Flight Museum

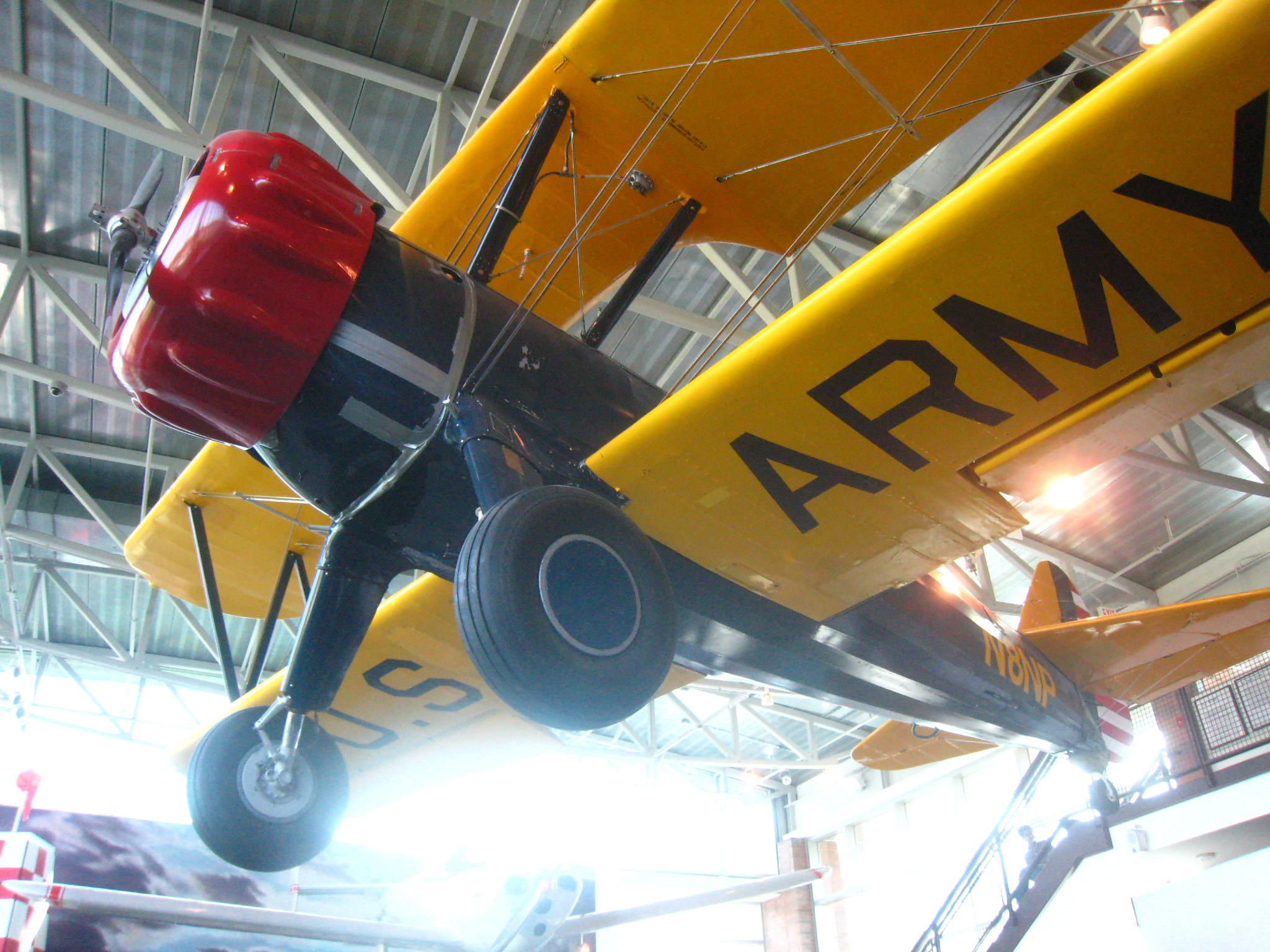
Boeing Stearman at the College Park Aviation Museum

- Model 70 is airworthy at the Western Antique Aeroplane & Automobile Museum in Hood River, Oregon. It is the original prototype of the Model 75.
- 37-0099 – PT-13A is on static display at the Museum of Flight in Seattle, Washington.
- 41-7121 - PT-17 is on static display at the US Army Aviation Museum in Fort Novosel, Alabama.
- 41-7960 – PT-17 is airworthy at Mississippi State University in Starkville, Mississippi. It is used as a research aircraft and glider tow-plane.
- 41-8786 – PT-17 is in storage at the New England Air Museum in Windsor Locks, Connecticut.
- 41-8882 – PT-17 on static display at the Pima Air and Space Museum in Tucson, Arizona.
- 41-25254 – PT-17 is airworthy at the Military Aviation Museum in Pungo, Virginia.
- 41-25284 – PT-17 is on static display at the Hill Aerospace Museum in Roy, Utah.
- 41-25588 – PT-17 is airworthy at the Charles M. Schulz–Sonoma County Airport in Santa Rosa, California.
- 41-25623 – PT-17 is on display at Patriots Point in Charleston, South Carolina.
- 42-15687 – PT-27 is on display at the Vintage Flying Museum in Fort Worth, Texas.
- 42-16365 – PT-17 is on static display at the Museum of Aviation in Warner Robins, Georgia.
- 42-16388 – PT-17D is on static display at the March Field Air Museum near Riverside, California.
- 42-16691 – PT-17 is on static display at the Castle Air Museum in Atwater, California.
- 42-17591 – PT-13D is on static display at the Planes of Fame Air Museum in Chino, California.
- 42-17724 – PT-13D is on static display at the National Museum of African American History and Culture in Washington, DC. It was used in 1944 to train members of the Tuskegee Airmen.
- 42-17763 – PT-13D is on static display at the Planes of Fame Air Museum in Valle, Arizona.
- 42-17800 – PT-13D is on static display at the National Museum of the United States Air Force in Dayton, Ohio. This aircraft is the 63rd to last aircraft built and was donated to the museum in 1959 by the Boeing Aircraft Company, which purchased the Stearman Company in 1934.
- 3514 – N2S-3 is airworthy with Neil Alan Raaz in Colleyville, Texas.
- 3558 – N2S-2 is under restoration to airworthy condition at the Planes of Fame Air Museum in Chino, California.
- 5369 – N2S-3 is on static display at the National Naval Aviation Museum in Pensacola, Florida. It was flown by George H. W. Bush during his initial training as a naval pilot.
- 7591 – N2S-3 is airworthy at the Valiant Air Command Warbird Museum in Titusville, Florida.
- 7718 – N2S-3 is airworthy at the Lone Star Flight Museum in Houston, Texas.
- 15923 – N2S is on static display at the Carolinas Aviation Museum in Charlotte, North Carolina.
- 29981 – N2S-4 is on display at the Air Zoo in Kalamazoo, Michigan.
- 38278 – N2S-3 is airworthy at the Tri-State Warbird Museum in Batavia, Ohio.
- 38490 – N2S-5 is airworthy at the Lone Star Flight Museum in Houston, Texas.
- 43197 – N2S-5 is under restoration to airworthy condition with the Commemorative Air Force Utah Wing in Heber City, Utah.
- 61064 – N2S-5 on static display at the Udvar-Hazy Center of the National Air and Space Museum in Chantilly, Virginia.
- 92468 – N2S-3 is on static display at the Pacific Aviation Museum Pearl Harbor in Honolulu, Hawaii. It was flown by George H. W. Bush during his initial training as a naval pilot.
- 75-133 – PT-17 is airworthy at the Simsbury Airport in Simsbury, Connecticut.
- 75-3845 – PT-27 is under restoration to airworthy condition at the Texas Air Museum in Slaton, Texas.
- 75-5337 – PT-13D is airworthy and owned by Sharon D. Smith. It is presumably located in DeRidder, Louisiana.
- 75-7540 – B75N1 is airworthy and resides at the Commemorative Air Force Airbase Arizona, Mesa, Arizona.
- 75-8234 - E75N1 is airworthy, owned by Ageless Aviation Dreams Foundation, Carson City, NV.
- 75-8498 – N2S-5 is airworthy at the CAF Big Easy Wing in New Orleans, Louisiana.
- A75N1 – PT-17 is on display at the College Park Aviation Museum in College Park, Maryland. It was flown by Gus McLeod for the first open-cockpit flight over the North Pole.
- N2S-3 is on display at the Western Antique Aeroplane and Automobile Museum in Hood River, Oregon.
- Stearman on display at Scottsdale Airport (KSDL)

== Specifications (PT-17) ==
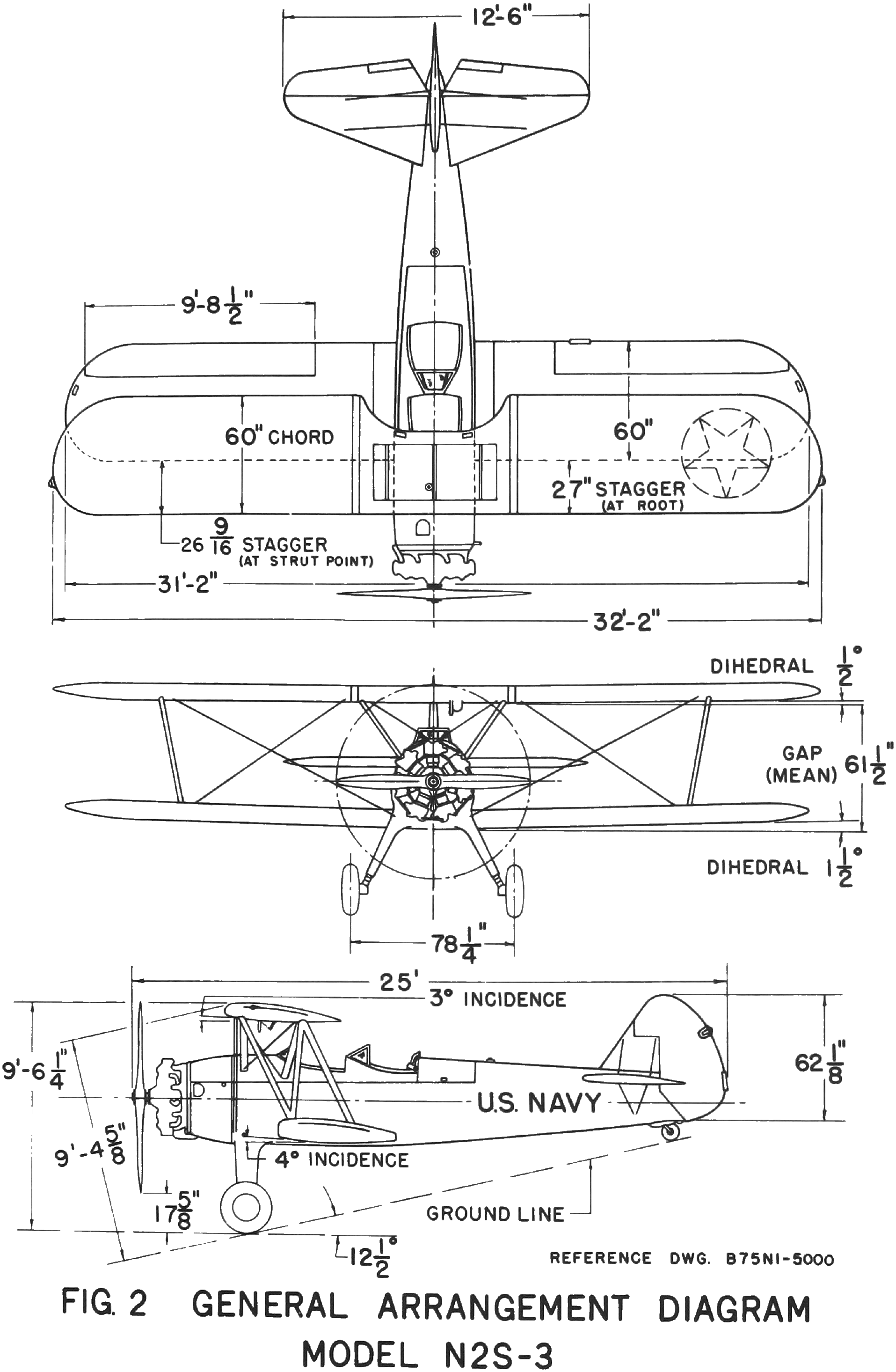
3-view line drawing of the Boeing N2S-3

Data from United States Military Aircraft since 1909

General characteristics

- Crew: 2
- Length: 24 ft 9 in (7.54 m)
- Wingspan: 32 ft 2 in (9.80 m)
- Height: 9 ft 8 in (2.95 m)
- Wing area: 298 sq ft (27.7 m^{2})
- Empty weight: 1,931 lb (876 kg)
- Max takeoff weight: 2,635 lb (1,195 kg)
- Fuel capacity: 46 US gal (38 imp gal; 170 L)
- Powerplant: 1 × Continental R-670-5 7-cylinder air-cooled radial piston engine, 220 hp (160 kW)
- Propellers: 2-bladed fixed-pitch propeller

Performance

- Maximum speed: 124 mph (200 km/h, 108 kn)
- Cruise speed: 96 mph (154 km/h, 83 kn)
- Service ceiling: 13,200 ft (4,000 m)
- Time to altitude: 10,000 ft (3,000 m) in 17 minutes 18 seconds
- Wing loading: 9.9 lb/sq ft (48 kg/m^{2})

== See also ==
Aircraft of comparable role, configuration, and era

- Arado Ar 66
- Bücker Bü 131
- De Havilland Tiger Moth
- Fleet Finch
- Focke-Wulf Fw 44
- Gotha Go 145
- Naval Aircraft Factory N3N
- Repülőgépgyár Levente II
- Polikarpov Po-2
- PWS-26
- Stampe-Vertongen SV.4
