= Texel International Airport =

Airport in the Netherlands

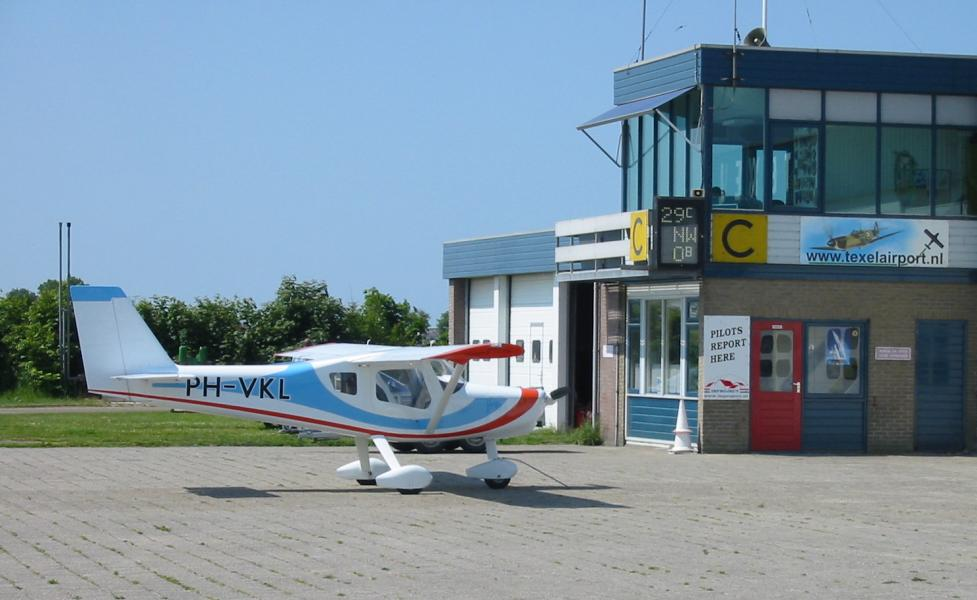
- IATA: none; ICAO: EHTX

Summary
- Airport type: Public
- Operator: Government
- Serves: Texel
- Location: Den Burg
- Elevation AMSL: 2 ft / 1 m
- Coordinates: 53°06′55″N 004°50′01″E
- Website: www.texelairport.nl
- Interactive map of Texel International Airport

Runways
Direction	Length		Surface
Direction	m	ft	Surface
04/22	1,115	3,685	Grass
13/31	630	2,066	Grass
- Sources: AIP

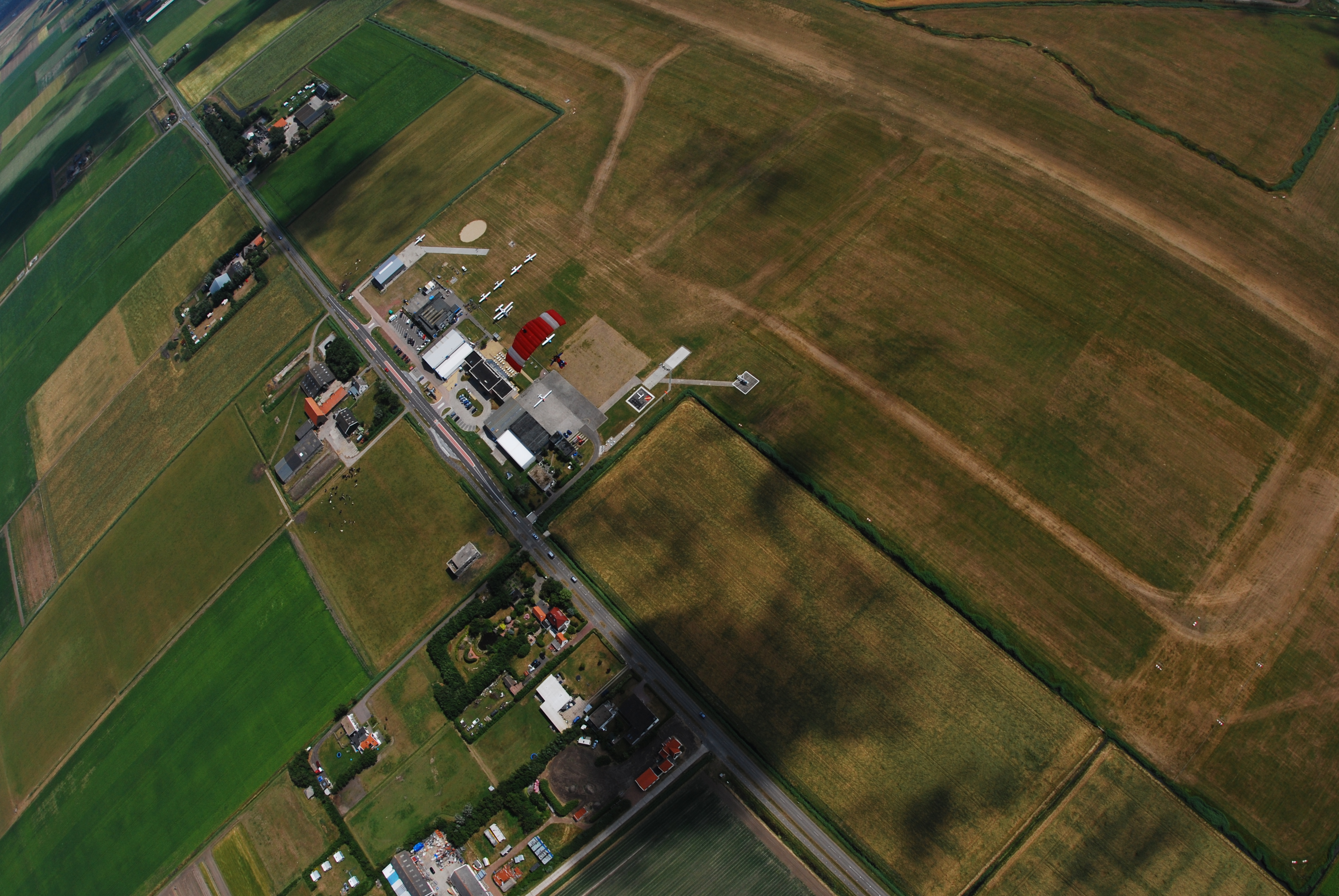
Aerial view of Texel Airport as seen from a parachute

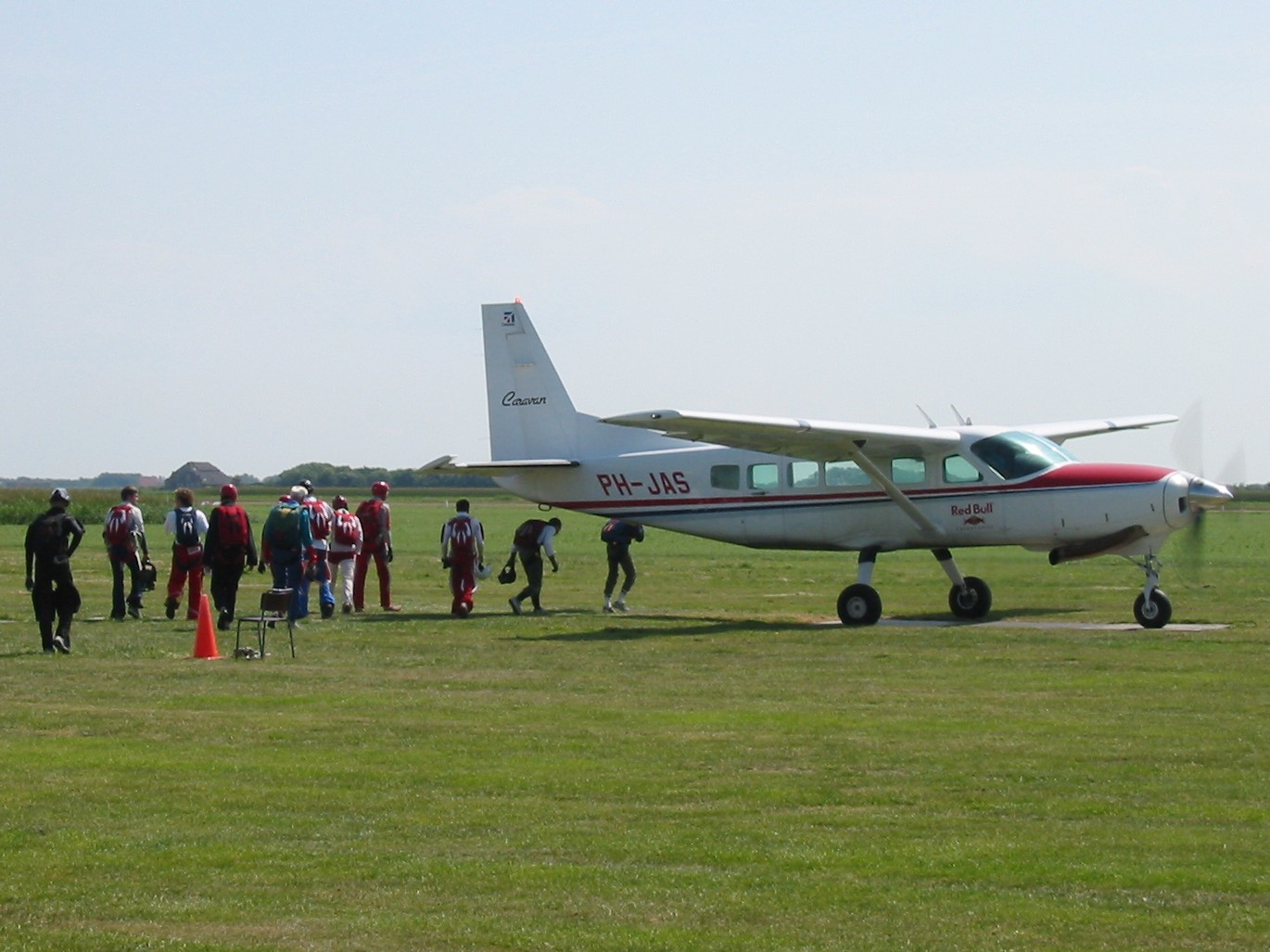
Skydivers walking to a Cessna 208 on Texel Airport

Texel International Airport (ICAO: EHTX) is a small airport located 3.5 NM (6.5 km; 4.0 mi) north northeast of Den Burg on the island of Texel in the north of the Netherlands. It has a customs service to handle international flights making it an international airport, though no scheduled international flights take place from the airport as the name might suggest. Because of this, it has no IATA code assigned to it.

The airfield is mainly used by small piston engine aircraft, but turboprops such as the Fokker 50 and small jets such as the Cessna Citation can also land at Texel. A lit platform for helicopters is also available. The biggest aircraft ever at Texel Airport was the Fokker 100, the biggest helicopter was a Mil Mi-26.

One of the main activities on Texel Airport is skydiving.

The island itself is a popular tourist destination especially during summer and so a lot of private pilots come to the island for recreation. There is also a small museum showing the history of aviation on the island.

== History ==
The airport was opened in 1937 under the name Vliegpark de Vlijt (Flying Park de Vlijt) as a joint military-civilian facility. It had been constructed as part of labour project to combat unemployment. KLM operated tourist flights to the new airfield using the Fokker F.XXXVI while the military based a number of aircraft.

At the start of the Second World War, the airfield came under attack by the German Luftwaffe, resulting in the destruction of 10 of the 25 based aircraft. Six Fokker D.XVII aircraft based at Texel as training aircraft were deployed against the invading Germans. The Dutch government surrendered quickly, however, and the airfield played no role of significance during the invasion. German troops captured the island and took control of the airfield, expanding it for their own use and naming it Fliegerhorst Texel. Concrete runways and taxiways were constructed, and numerous bunkers were built. The airfield was attacked several times by the Royal Air Force in 1940, but little damage was done. In April 1943, it was decided to no longer make use of the airfield, and obstructions were placed to prevent allied aircraft from using it as a potential landing site.

After the war, the site of the airfield briefly became a prison camp for collaborators, using some of the former German shelters. During this period, the concrete runways and taxiways were removed. It was not until 1952 that flying was resumed at the airfield.

=== DC-3 disaster ===
A memorial on the airport reminds of the disaster with a Douglas DC-3 from the Dutch Dakota Association on 25 September 1996. It was on its way from Texel to de Kooy airport at Den Helder when one of the engines failed and the crew was unable to feather the propeller. The aircraft crashed in shallow water near the town hall of Den Oever. None of the 32 people on board survived the crash.
