= Dutch government aircraft =

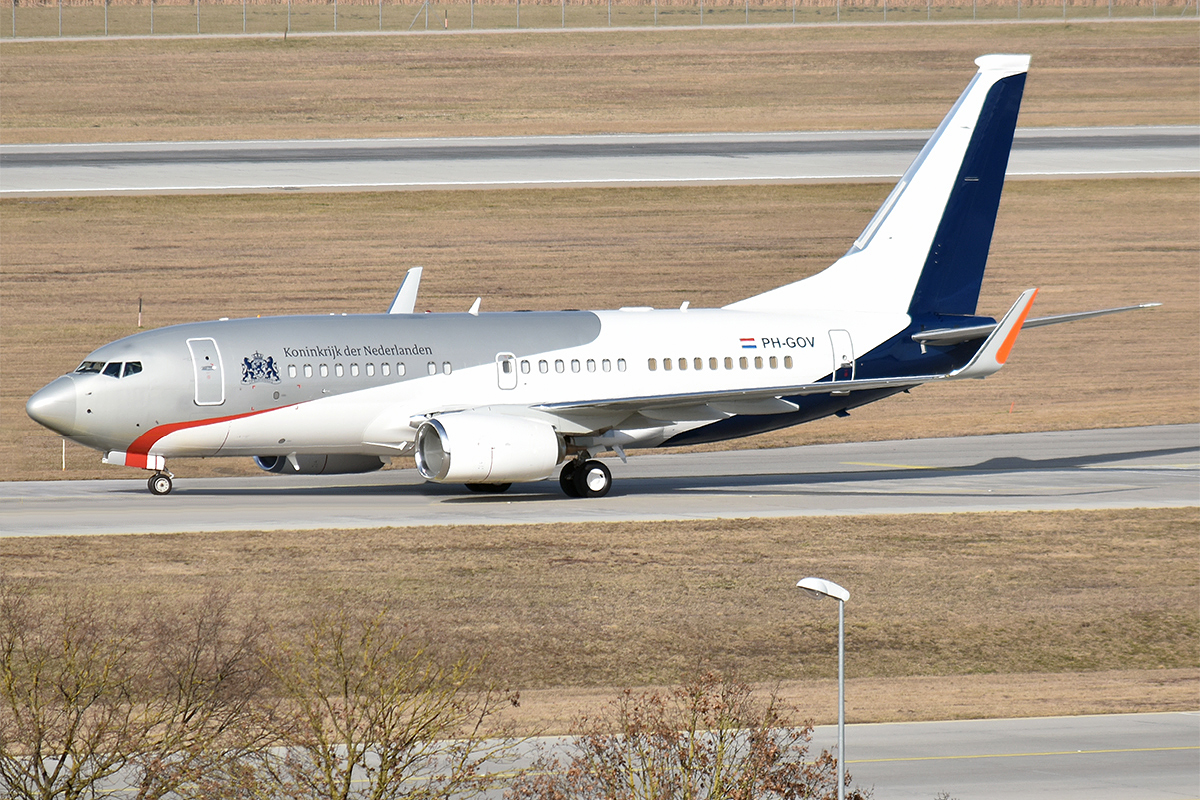
The current Dutch government aircraft, a Boeing 737 with registration PH-GOV

Five different models have served as the Dutch government aircraft since 1946 for use by the Dutch royal family and cabinet members. The current model, a Boeing 737-700 with registration PH-GOV, has been in service since August 2019.

Prince Bernhard of Lippe-Biesterfeld purchased the first Dutch government aircraft in 1946, a Douglas DC-3 Dakota used in World War II. It was registered as PH-PBA, "PH" being the Netherlands' country code and "PBA" standing for "Prince Bernhard Alpha". Subsequent aircraft were a Fokker F27 Friendship, first used in 1961 and registered as PH-PBF, and a Fokker F28 Fellowship, first used in 1972 and registered as PH-PBX. A Fokker F70 Executive Jet was presented in March 1996. Its registration, PH-KBX, referred to Queen Beatrix of the Netherlands (koningin being the Dutch word for "queen"). While early usage was mostly by the royal family, by 2016 the government aircraft was used for 80% for flights by government ministers and state secretaries, compared to 20% for the royal family.

In 2014, the government established a protocol for air movement priority: the head of state is given precedence, followed by the prime minister, ministers, and then other members of the royal family.

The current Dutch government aircraft is operated by the Dutch flag carrier KLM, having also operated all previous Dutch government aircraft.

== Gallery ==
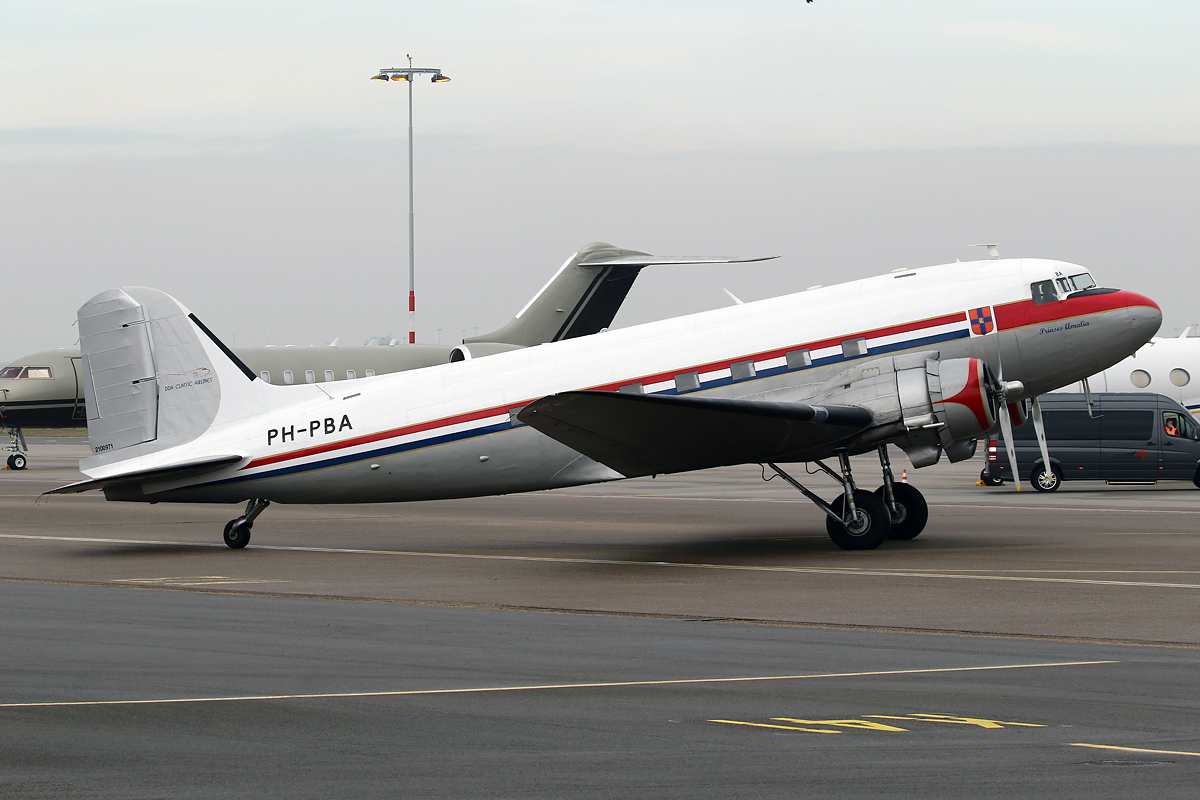
Douglas DC-3, PH-PBA

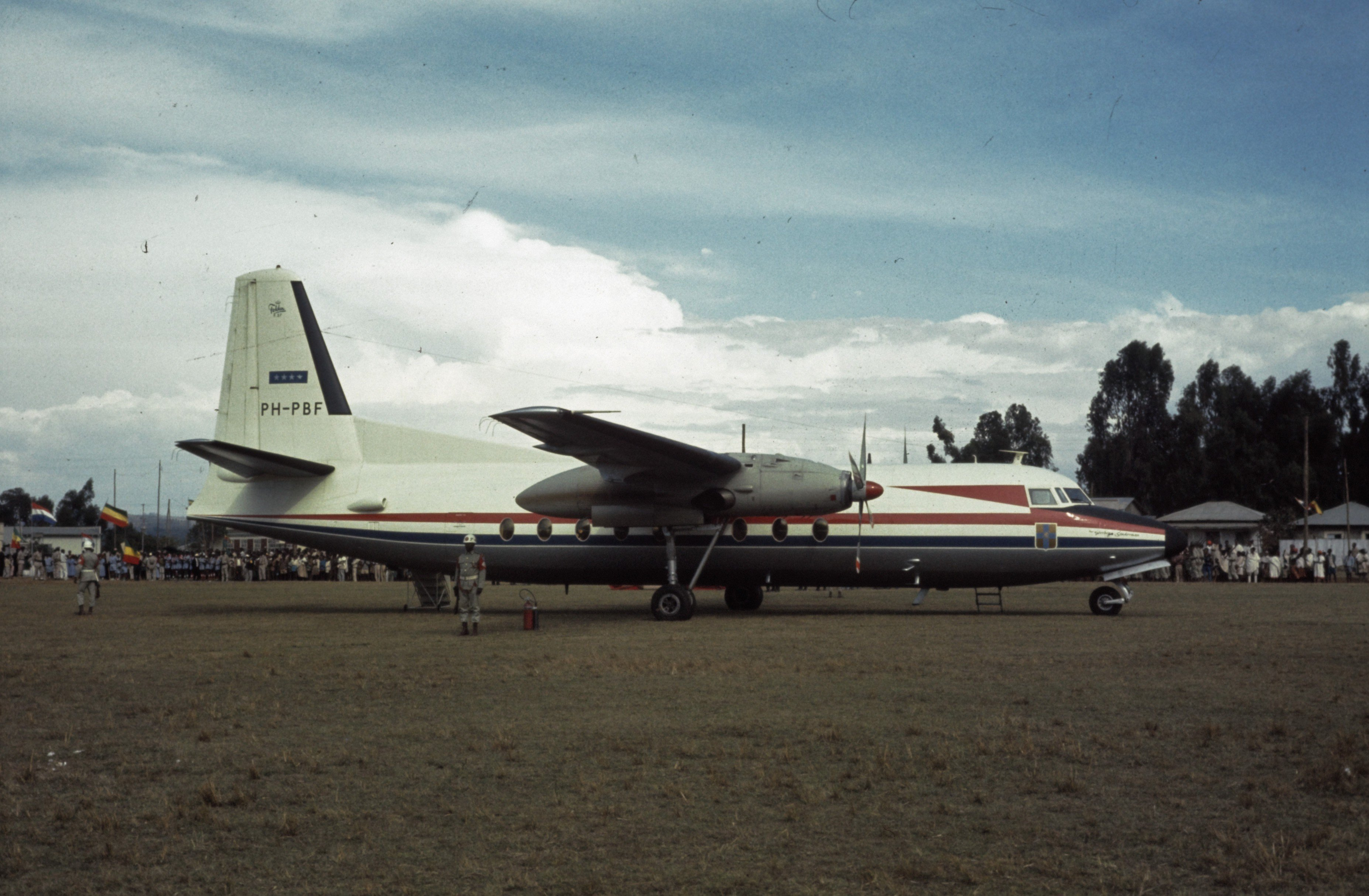
Fokker F27, PH-PBF

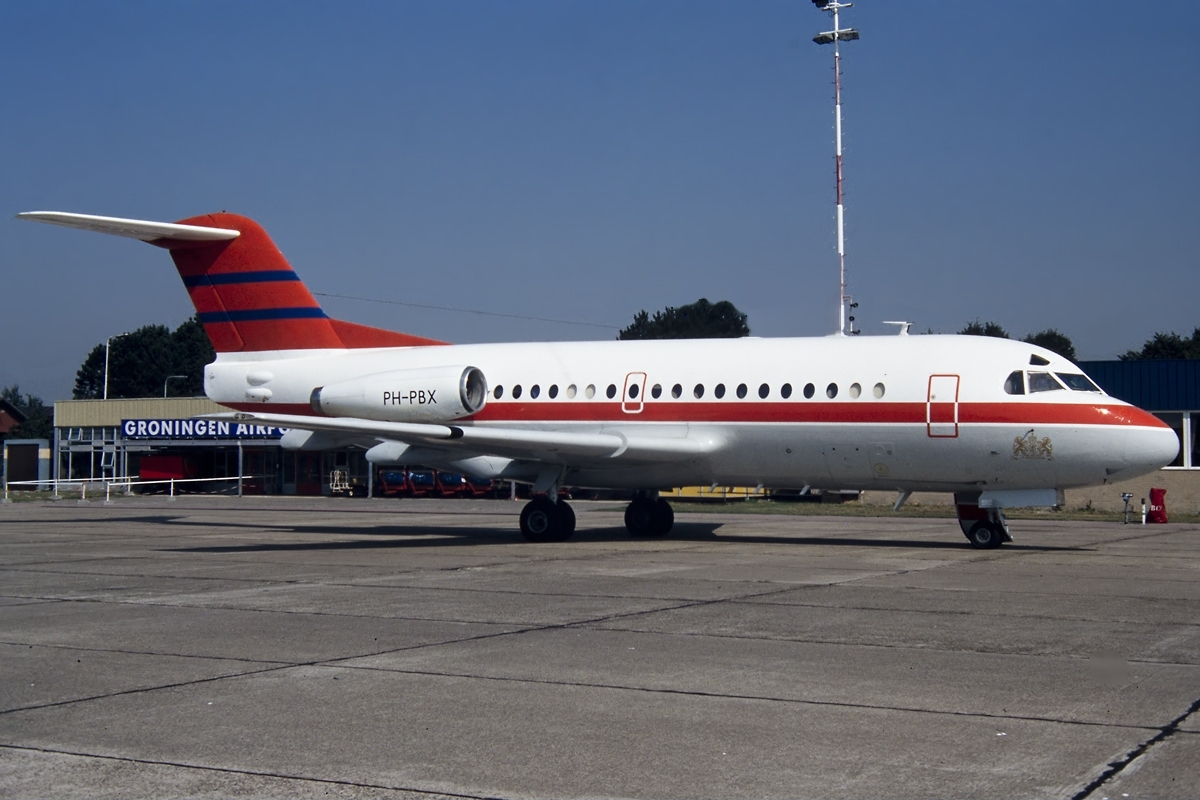
Fokker F28, PH-PBX

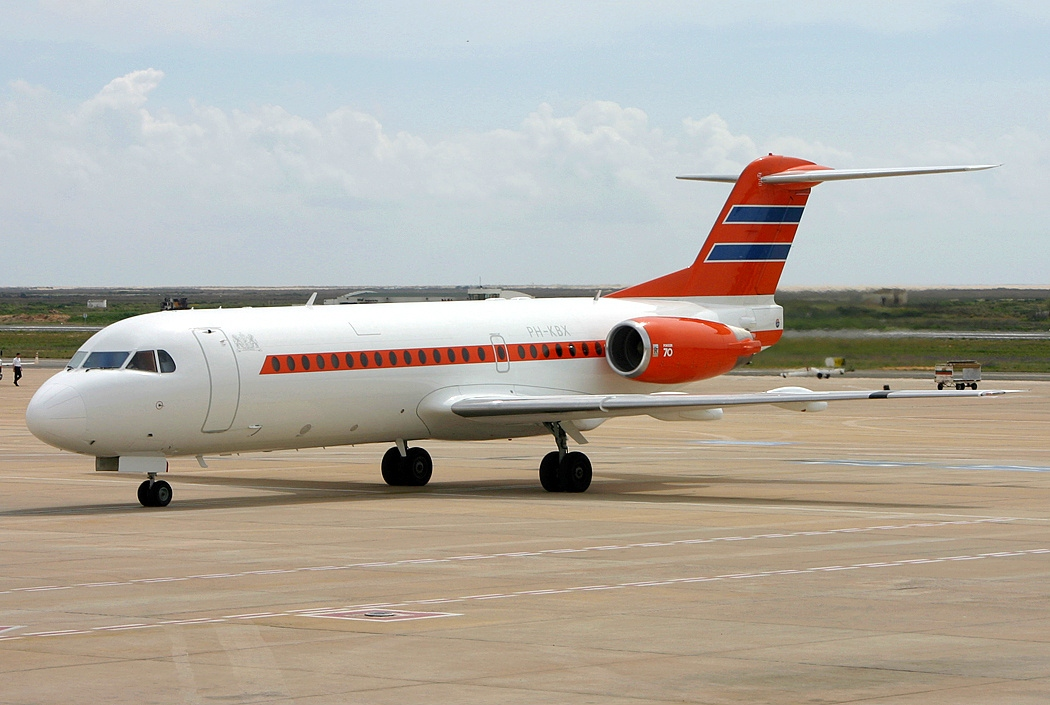
Fokker F70, PH-KBX

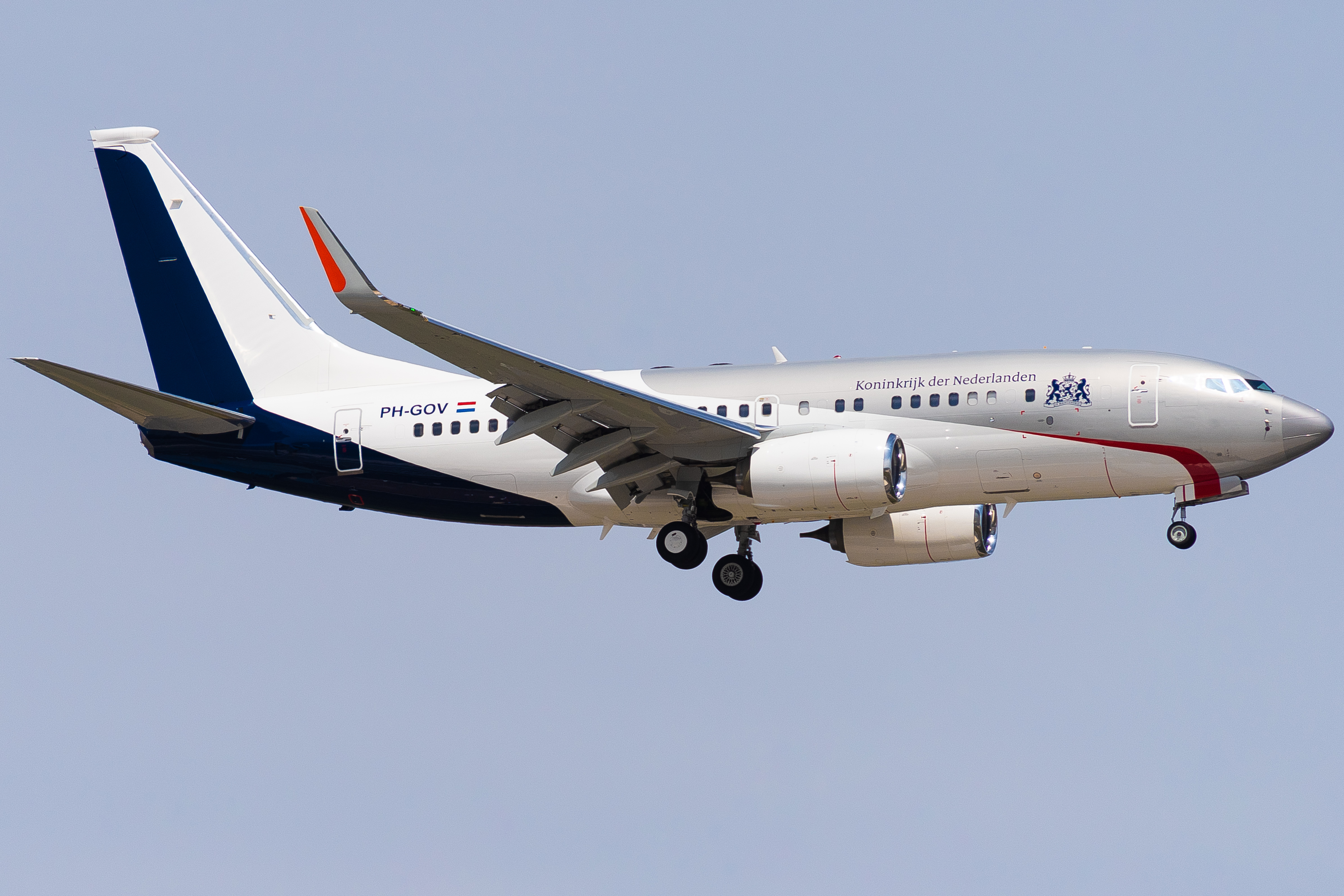
Boeing 737, PH-GOV

== See also ==
- Air transports of heads of state and government
