= Air Creation iXess =

French ultralight trike

iXess
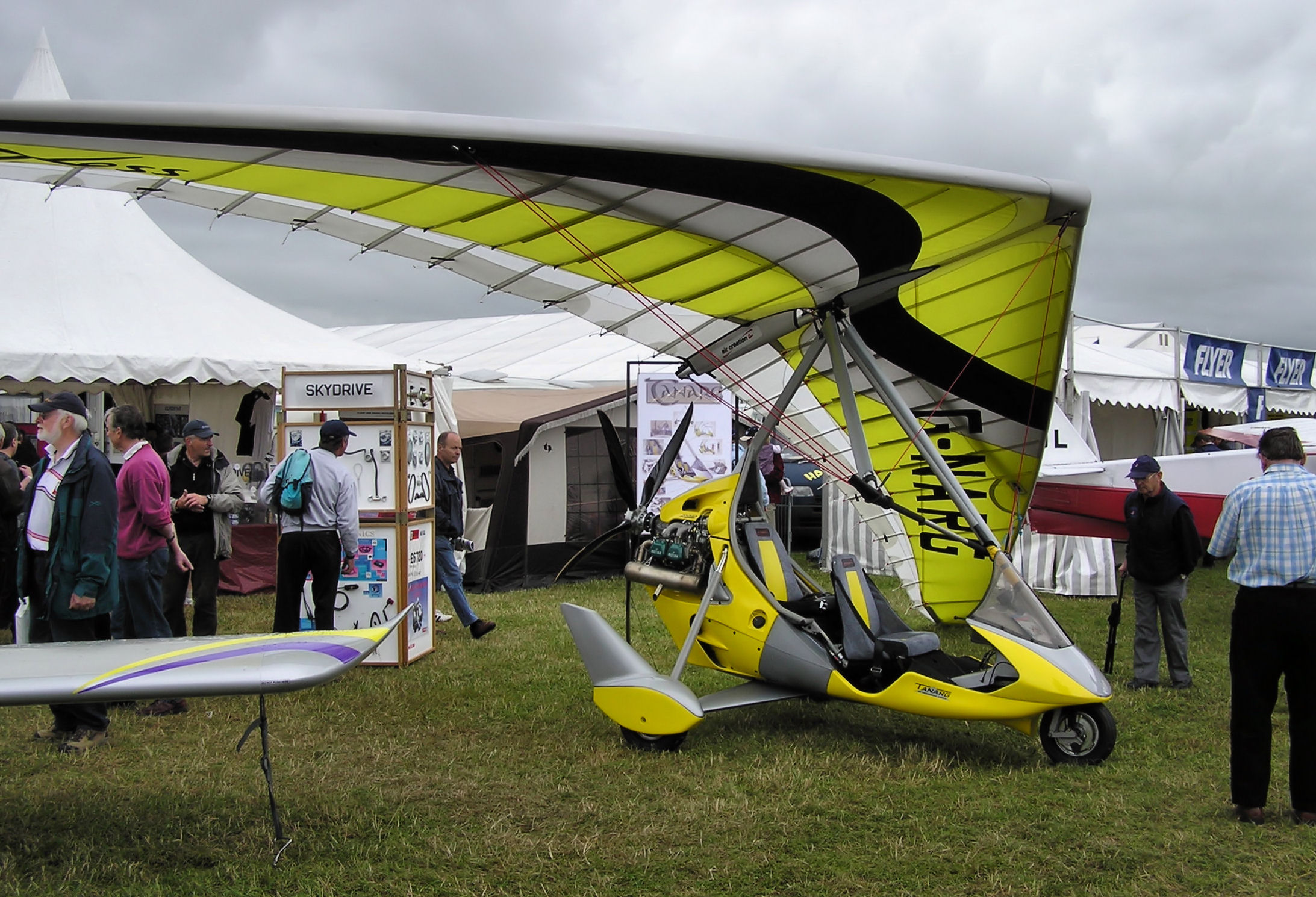
- iXess wing mounted on an Air Creation Tanarg trike

General information
- Type: Ultralight trike wing
- National origin: France
- Manufacturer: Air Creation
- Status: In production (2013)

History
- Introduction date: circa 2000

The Air Creation iXess is a French double-surface ultralight trike wing, designed and produced by Air Creation of Aubenas. The wing is widely used on Air Creation trikes, as well as those of other manufacturers.

== Design and development ==
The wing is a cable-braced, king post-equipped hang glider-style wing designed as a high performance and competition wing for two-place trikes, although it is also used for flight training. It currently comes in one size, the iXess 15, named for its metric wing area of 15 m^{2} (160 sq ft), although a 13 m^{2} (140 sq ft) version was once available.

The wing is made from bolted-together aluminium tubing, with its 90% double surface wing covered in Dacron sailcloth. Its 10 m (32.8 ft) span wing has a nose angle of 120°, an aspect ratio of 6.66:1 and uses an "A" frame weight-shift control bar.

Originally the top-of-the line wing in Air Creation's catalog, the iXess has lost that position to the Air Creation BioniX, although the iXess remained in production through 2013.

== Operational history ==
The iXess has been widely used in microlight competition and was used to win World Championships in 2001, 2005 and 2007, as well as the European Championships in 2002, 2004 and 2006.

== Variants ==
iXess 13
13 m^{2} (140 sq ft) version, no longer in production
iXess 15
15 m^{2} (160 sq ft) version, still in production in 2013

== Applications ==
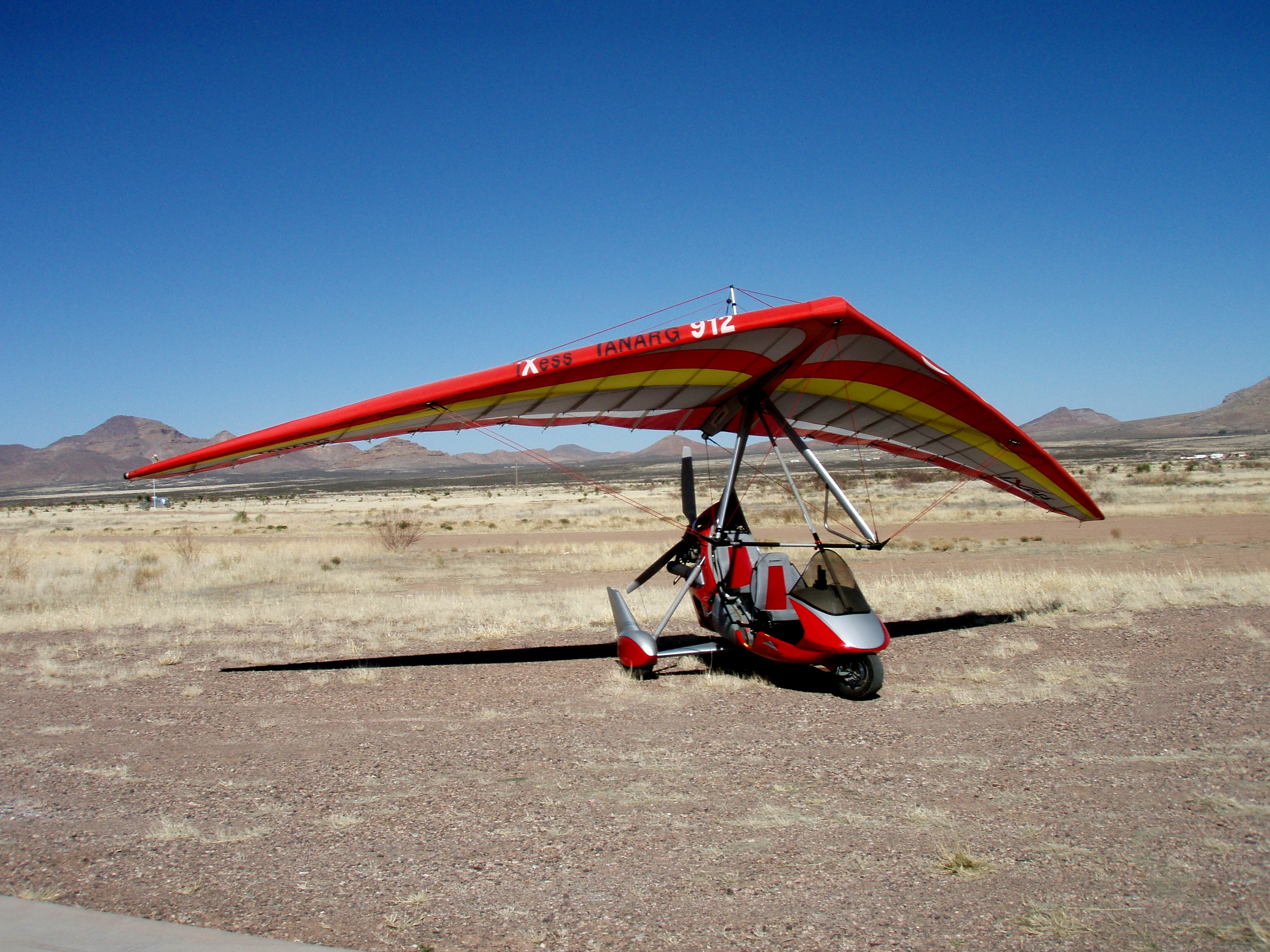
iXess wing mounted on an Air Creation Tanarg trike

- Air Creation iXess Clipper 582
- Air Creation Skypper
- Air Creation Tanarg
- Air Creation Trek
- Apollo Jet Star
- Take Off Merlin
- Ventura 1200

== Specifications (iXess 15) ==
Data from Bayerl and Air Creation

General characteristics

- Wingspan: 10 m (32 ft 10 in)
- Wing area: 15 m^{2} (160 sq ft)
- Aspect ratio: 6.66:1
- Empty weight: 53 kg (117 lb) wing weight
- Gross weight: 450 kg (992 lb) maximum aircraft gross weight allowed

Performance

- Stall speed: 60 km/h (37 mph, 32 kn)
- Never exceed speed: 130 km/h (81 mph, 70 kn)
- g limits: +6/-3 at 450 kg (992 lb)
