= Air Creation NuviX =

French ulgtralight trike

NuviX

General information
- Type: Ultralight trike wing
- National origin: France
- Manufacturer: Air Creation
- Status: In production (2013)

The Air Creation NuviX is a French double-surface ultralight trike wing, designed and produced by Air Creation of Aubenas. The wing is widely used on Air Creation trikes.

== Design and development ==
The wing is a cable-braced, king post-equipped hang glider-style wing that was designed as an advanced, top-of-the-line wing for the Air Creation Skypper two-place trike, although it can also be fitted on the earlier Air Creation GT series of trikes as well. It comes in one size, with a wing area of 15.2 m^{2} (164 sq ft).

The wing is made from bolted-together aluminium tubing, with its double surface wing covered in Dacron sailcloth. It has a span of 9.55 m (31.3 ft) span wing, a nose angle of 130°, an aspect ratio of 6.0:1 and uses an "A" frame weight-shift control bar. Like the similar Air Creation BioniX wing, the NuviX incorporates a unique "corset" system that allows the pilot to adjust the wing's trailing edge geometry in flight to optimize performance. This results in a large speed range and good handling characteristics in turbulence, without heavy roll control.

== Applications ==
- Air Creation GT
- Air Creation Skypper

== Specifications (NuviX 15) ==
Data from Bayerl and Air Creation

General characteristics

- Wingspan: 9.55 m (31 ft 4 in)
- Wing area: 15.2 m^{2} (164 sq ft)
- Aspect ratio: 6.0:1
- Empty weight: 52 kg (115 lb) wing weight
- Gross weight: 462 kg (1,019 lb) maximum aircraft gross weight allowed

Performance

- Maximum speed: 140 km/h (87 mph, 76 kn)
- Stall speed: 61 km/h (38 mph, 33 kn)
- Wing loading: 30.4 kg/m^{2} (6.2 lb/sq ft) maximum
