= Air Creation Skypper =

French ultralight trike

Skypper
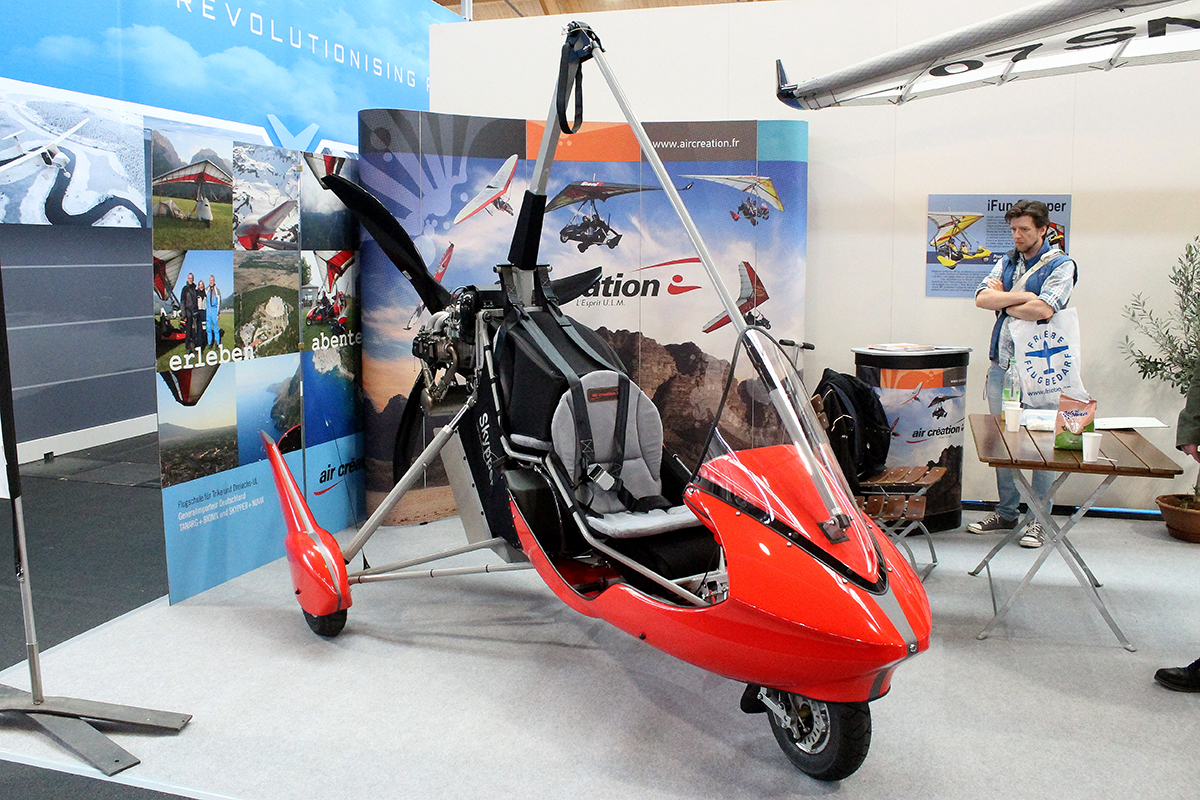

General information
- Type: Ultralight trike
- National origin: France
- Manufacturer: Air Creation
- Status: In production (2013)

History
- Introduction date: 2011

The Air Creation Skypper is a French ultralight trike, designed and produced by Air Creation of Aubenas. The aircraft was introduced in 2011 and is supplied complete and ready-to-fly.

== Design and development ==
The Skypper was designed as a simpler, lighter and less expensive carriage than the top-of-the line Air Creation Tanarg, to replace the Air Creation GT series in production. It was intended to comply with the Fédération Aéronautique Internationale microlight category. It features a cable-braced hang glider-style high-wing, weight-shift controls, a two-seats-in-tandem, open cockpit, tricycle landing gear with wheel pants and a single engine in pusher configuration.

The aircraft is made from bolted-together aluminium tubing, with its double surface wing covered in Dacron sailcloth. The wing is supported by a single tube-type kingpost and uses an "A" frame weight-shift control bar. Available powerplants include the a twin cylinder, liquid-cooled, two-stroke, dual-ignition 64 hp (48 kW) Rotax 582 engine, the four cylinder, air and liquid-cooled, four-stroke, dual-ignition 80 hp (60 kW) Rotax 912UL or 100 hp (75 kW) Rotax 912ULS engine and the twin cylinder, air-cooled, four-stroke, dual-ignition 60 hp (45 kW) HKS 700E.

With the Rotax 582 the aircraft has an empty weight of 201 kg (443 lb) and a gross weight of 462 kg (1,019 lb), giving a useful load of 261 kg (575 lb). With full fuel of 55 litres (12 imp gal; 15 US gal) the payload is 221 kg (487 lb).

A number of different wings can be fitted to the basic carriage, including the Air Creation NuviX, Fun 450, iFun 16, iXess 13 and the BioniX.

When equipped with the Bionix wing and Rotax 912 engine the Skypper was €6,300 cheaper than the more sophisticated Air Creation Tanarg with the same engine and wing, in 2011.

== Specifications (Skypper 582 NuviX) ==
Data from Bayerl and Air Creation

General characteristics

- Crew: one
- Capacity: one passenger
- Wingspan: 9.55 m (31 ft 4 in)
- Height: 3.45 m (11 ft 4 in)
- Wing area: 15.2 m^{2} (164 sq ft) with Air Creation NuviX wing
- Aspect ratio: 6.00:1
- Empty weight: 201 kg (443 lb)
- Gross weight: 462 kg (1,019 lb)
- Fuel capacity: 55 litres (12 imp gal; 15 US gal)
- Powerplant: 1 × Rotax 582 twin cylinder, liquid-cooled, two stroke aircraft engine, 48 kW (64 hp)
- Propellers: 3-bladed composite Ecoprop, 1.72 m (5 ft 8 in) diameter

Performance

- Maximum speed: 125 km/h (78 mph, 67 kn)
- Stall speed: 53 km/h (33 mph, 29 kn)
- Rate of climb: 3.5 m/s (690 ft/min)
- Wing loading: 30.4 kg/m^{2} (6.2 lb/sq ft)
