= Air Creation Tanarg =

French ultralight trike

Tanarg
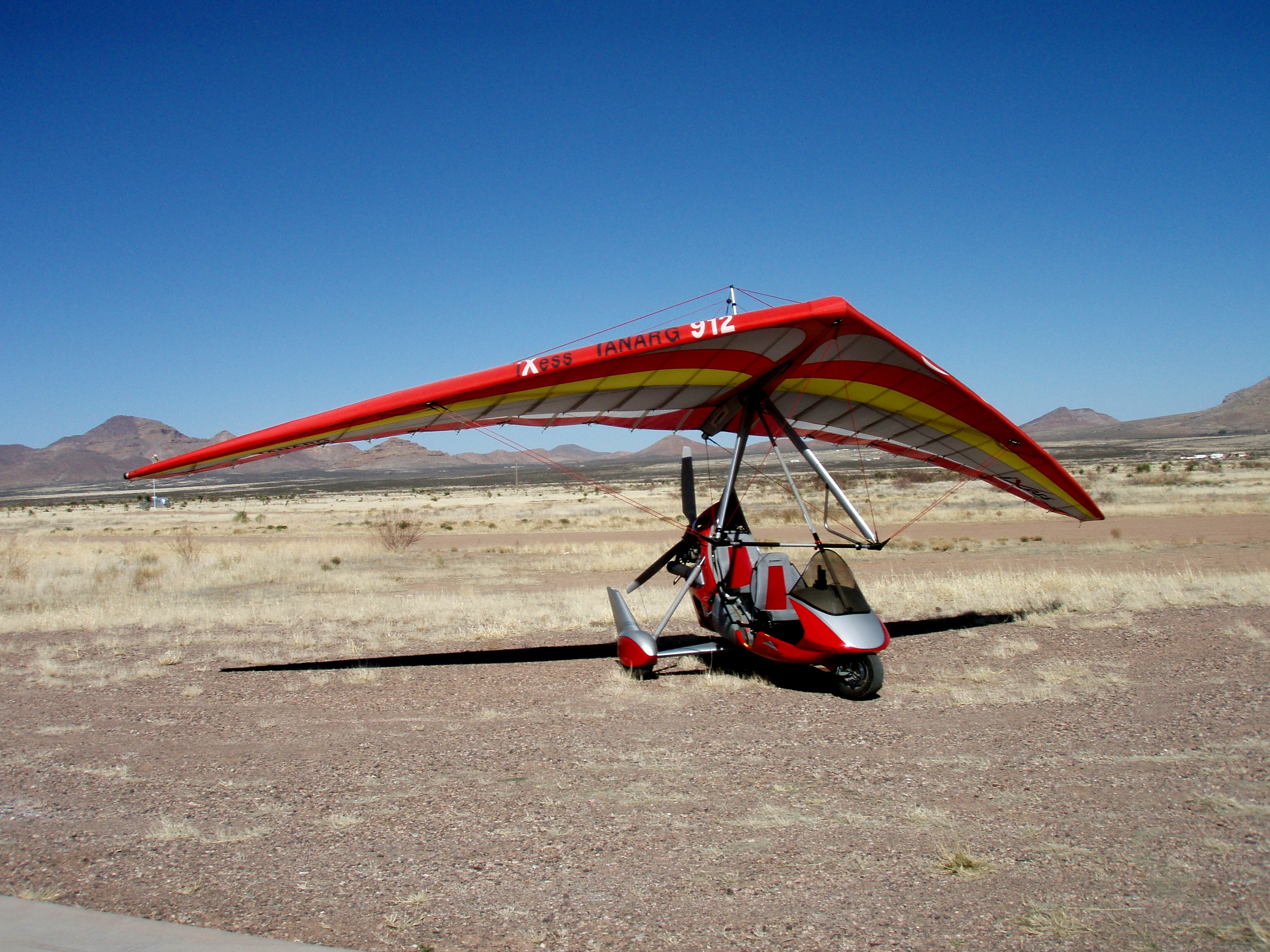
- Tanarg with the Air Creation iXess wing

General information
- Type: Ultralight trike and Light-sport aircraft
- National origin: France
- Manufacturer: Air Creation
- Status: In production (2013)

The Air Creation Tanarg is a French ultralight trike, designed and produced by Air Creation of Aubenas. The aircraft is supplied as complete ready-to-fly-aircraft. In the United Kingdom the Tanarg is amateur-built from kits supplied by Air Creation.

== Design and development ==
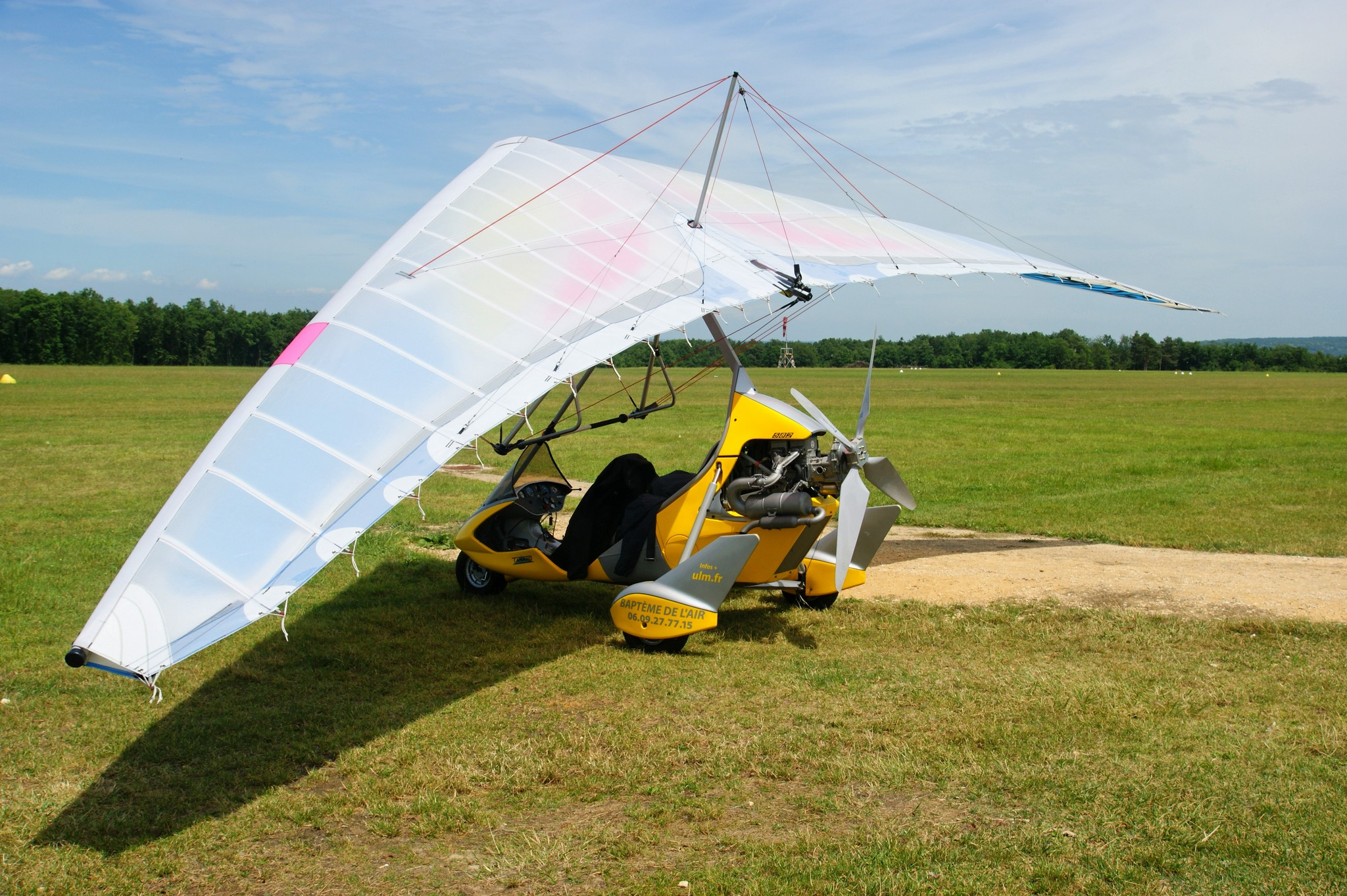
Air Creation Tanarg

The Tanarg was designed as a long-range cruising trike to comply with the Fédération Aéronautique Internationale microlight category, including the category's maximum gross weight of 472.5 kg (1,042 lb) with a ballistic parachute. It is also an accepted Special Light-Sport Aircraft in the United States. The Tanarg features a cable-braced hang glider-style high-wing, weight-shift controls, a two-seats-in-tandem, open cockpit, tricycle landing gear with wheel pants and a single engine in pusher configuration.

The aircraft is made from mixed constriction, with bolted-together aluminium tubing, composites and carbon fibre panels, with its double surface wing covered in Dacron sailcloth. With the BioniX wing it has a 9.85 m (32.3 ft) span that is supported by a single tube-type kingpost and uses an "A" frame weight-shift control bar. The powerplant options include the twin cylinder, liquid-cooled, two-stroke, dual-ignition 64 hp (48 kW) Rotax 582 engine and the four cylinder, air and liquid-cooled, four-stroke, dual-ignition 80 hp (60 kW) Rotax 912UL and 100 hp (75 kW) Rotax 912ULS engines. With the 912 engine the aircraft has an empty weight of 249 kg (549 lb) and a gross weight of 472.5 kg (1,042 lb), giving a useful load of 223.5 kg (493 lb). With full fuel of 70 litres (15 imp gal; 18 US gal) the payload is 183 kg (403 lb).

A number of different wings can be fitted to the basic trike, including the Air Creation iXess, Air Creation Nuvix, Air Creation Fun and Air Creation BioniX.

== Specifications (Tanarg 912 trike with a BioniX 15 wing) ==
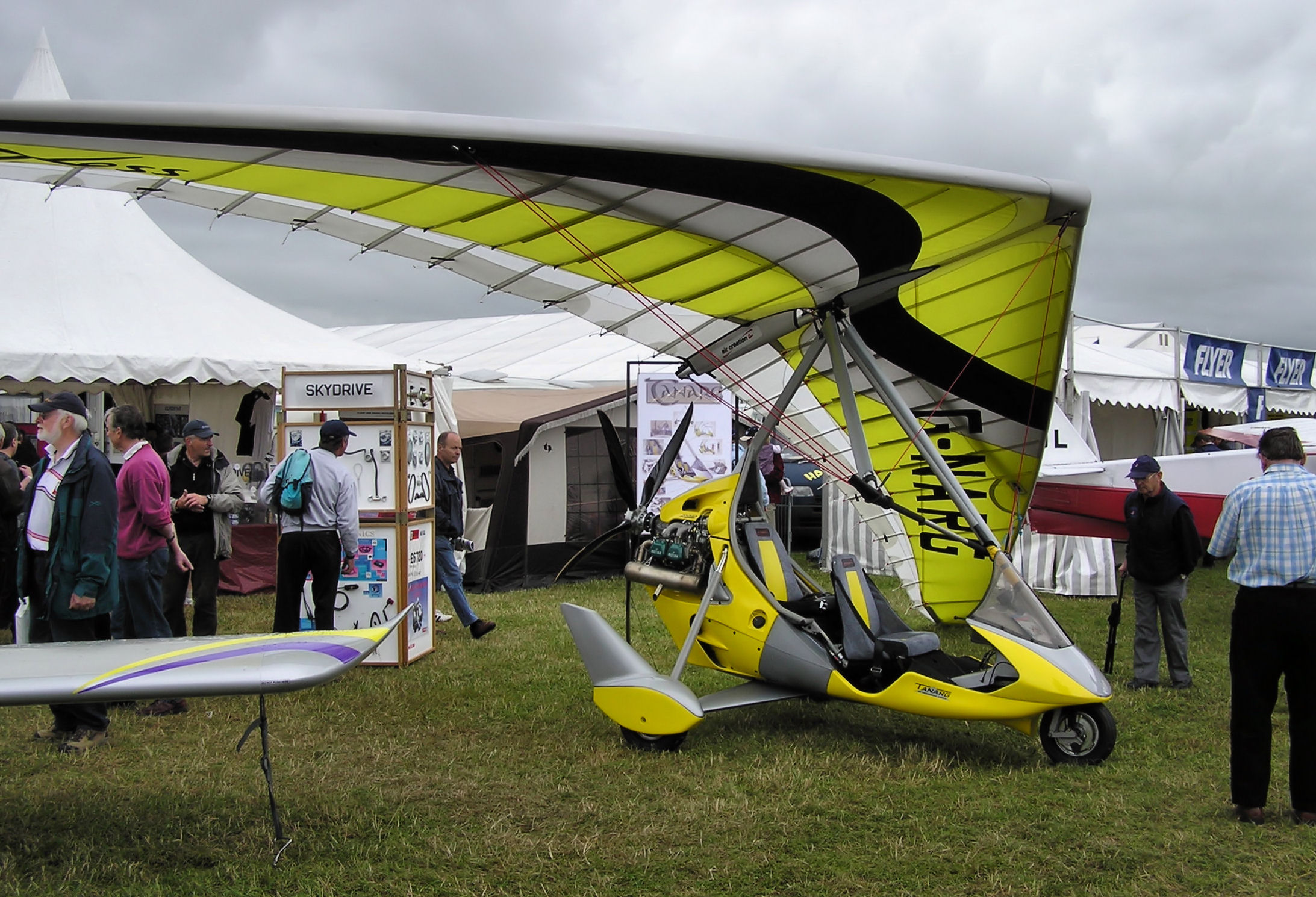
Air Creation Tanarg with the Air Creation iXess wing

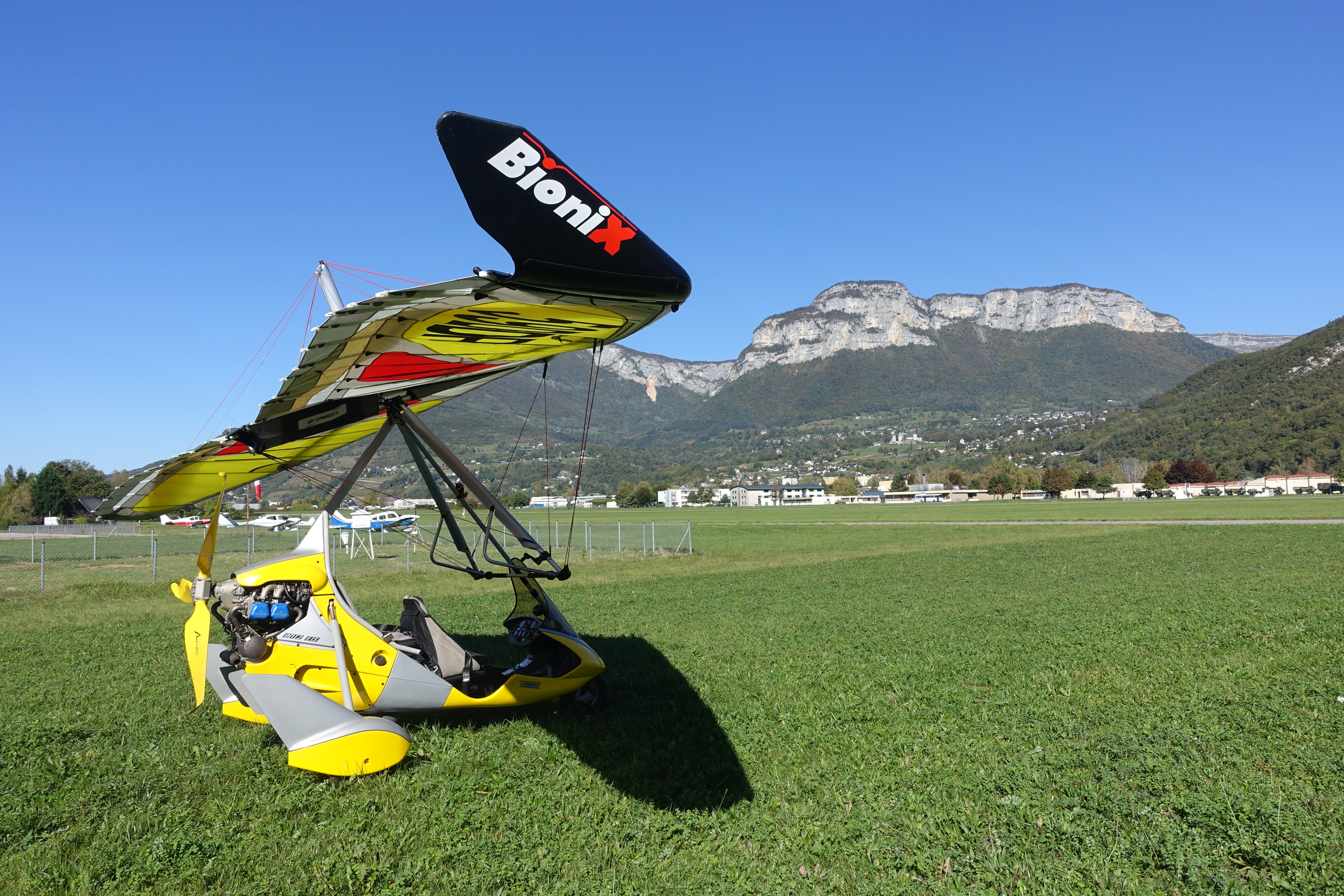
Air Creation Tanarg with an Air Creation Bionix wing

Data from Bayerl and Air Creation

General characteristics

- Crew: one
- Capacity: one passenger
- Wingspan: 9.85 m (32 ft 4 in)
- Height: 3.45 m (11 ft 4 in)
- Wing area: 15.1 m^{2} (163 sq ft)
- Aspect ratio: 6.4:1
- Empty weight: 249 kg (549 lb)
- Gross weight: 472.5 kg (1,042 lb)
- Fuel capacity: 70 litres (15 imp gal; 18 US gal)
- Powerplant: 1 × Rotax 912ULS four cylinder, liquid and air-cooled, four stroke aircraft engine, 75 kW (101 hp)
- Propellers: 3-bladed Arplast Helice composite, 1.66 m (5 ft 5 in) diameter

Performance

- Maximum speed: 157 km/h (98 mph, 85 kn)
- Cruise speed: 135 km/h (84 mph, 73 kn)
- Stall speed: 55 km/h (34 mph, 30 kn)
- Rate of climb: 6 m/s (1,200 ft/min)
- Wing loading: 30 kg/m^{2} (6.1 lb/sq ft) maximum
