= Air Creation Twin =

French ultralight trike

Twin

General information
- Type: Ultralight trike
- National origin: France
- Manufacturer: Air Creation
- Status: Production completed

The Air Creation Twin is a French ultralight trike that was designed and produced by Air Creation of Aubenas. Production has been completed, but while the aircraft was available it was supplied as an assembly kit for amateur construction or as a complete ready-to-fly-aircraft.

== Design and development ==
The Twin was designed as a trainer for the Air Creation Fun Racer. It complies with the Fédération Aéronautique Internationale microlight category, including the category's maximum gross weight of 450 kg (992 lb). The aircraft has a maximum gross weight of 385 kg (849 lb). It features a cable-braced hang glider-style high-wing, weight-shift controls, a two-seats-in-tandem open cockpit without a cockpit fairing, tricycle landing gear with wheel pants and a single engine in pusher configuration.

The aircraft is made from bolted-together aluminium tubing, with its Air Creation Fun 450 single surface wing covered in Trilam Dacron sailcloth, with a Mylar leading edge. The 10.06 m (33.0 ft) span wing is supported by a single tube-type kingpost, uses an "A" frame weight-shift control bar and has a wing area of 17.4 m^{2} (187 sq ft). The powerplant is a twin cylinder, air-cooled, two-stroke, dual-ignition 50 hp (37 kW) Rotax 503 engine. The aircraft has an empty weight of 129 kg (284 lb) and a gross weight of 385 kg (849 lb), giving a useful load of 256 kg (564 lb). With full fuel of 39 litres (8.6 imp gal; 10 US gal) the payload is 229 kg (505 lb).

The manufacturer estimates the construction time from the supplied kit as 40 hours.

== Specifications (Twin with Fun 450 wing) ==
Data from Bayerl

General characteristics

- Crew: one
- Capacity: one passenger
- Length: 3.35 m (11 ft 0 in)
- Wingspan: 10.06 m (33 ft 0 in)
- Wing area: 17.4 m^{2} (187 sq ft)
- Empty weight: 129 kg (284 lb)
- Gross weight: 385 kg (849 lb)
- Fuel capacity: 39 litres (8.6 imp gal; 10 US gal)
- Powerplant: 1 × Rotax 503 twin cylinder, air-cooled, two stroke aircraft engine, 37 kW (50 hp)
- Propellers: 3-bladed composite

Performance

- Maximum speed: 105 km/h (65 mph, 56 kn)
- Cruise speed: 74 km/h (46 mph, 40 kn)
- Stall speed: 47 km/h (29 mph, 25 kn)
- Rate of climb: 4.10 m/s (807 ft/min)
