= Air Creation Pixel =

French ultralight trike

Pixel

General information
- Type: Ultralight trike
- National origin: France
- Manufacturer: Air Creation
- Status: In production (2018)

The Air Creation Pixel is a French ultralight trike, designed and produced by Air Creation of Aubenas. The aircraft is supplied complete and ready-to-fly or as a kit for amateur construction.

== Design and development ==
The Pixel was designed to comply with the Fédération Aéronautique Internationale microlight category, the US FAR 103 Ultralight Vehicles rules and the German 120 kg class. The aircraft has a standard empty weight of 95 kg (209 lb).

The aircraft design features a cable-braced hang glider-style high-wing, weight-shift controls, a single-seat open cockpit without a cockpit fairing, tricycle landing gear and a single engine in pusher configuration.

The aircraft is made from bolted-together aluminium tubing, with its double surface wing covered in Dacron sailcloth. Its 8.8 m (28.9 ft) span iFun 13 wing has an area of 13 m^{2} (140 sq ft), is supported by a single tube-type kingpost and uses an "A" frame weight-shift control bar. The powerplant is a single-cylinder, air-cooled, two-stroke, single-ignition 36 hp (27 kW) Polini Thor 250 engine.

The aircraft has an empty weight of 95 kg (209 lb) and a gross weight of 250 kg (551 lb), giving a useful load of 155 kg (342 lb). With full fuel of 16 litres (3.5 imp gal; 4.2 US gal) the payload is 144 kg (317 lb) for pilot and baggage.

A number of different wings can be fitted to the basic carriage, although the purpose-designed iFun 13 is standard. That wing is available as a "short pack" with optional rigid struts to facilitate hangar storage folded with the wing remaining on the trike carriage. The iFun 13 has a speed range of 41 to 110 km/h (25 to 68 mph).

The Pixel is available in the XC model, which includes a windshield, instrument panel, electric starter, hand throttle, canvas siding and baggage storage compartment. A pneumatic ballistic parachute is optional and adds 4 kg (9 lb) to the empty weight.

== Specifications (iFun 13 Pixel XC) ==
Data from Tacke and manufacturer

General characteristics

- Crew: one
- Wingspan: 8.8 m (28 ft 10 in)
- Wing area: 13 m^{2} (140 sq ft)
- Empty weight: 95 kg (209 lb)
- Gross weight: 250 kg (551 lb)
- Fuel capacity: 16 litres (3.5 imp gal; 4.2 US gal)
- Powerplant: 1 × Polini Thor 250 single-cylinder, air-cooled, two stroke aircraft engine, 27 kW (36 hp)
- Propellers: 2-bladed fixed pitch

Performance

- Maximum speed: 110 km/h (68 mph, 59 kn)
- Cruise speed: 80 km/h (50 mph, 43 kn)
- Stall speed: 43 km/h (27 mph, 23 kn)
- g limits: +6/-3
- Rate of climb: 4 m/s (790 ft/min)
- Wing loading: 19.2 kg/m^{2} (3.9 lb/sq ft)
