= Ventura 1200 =

French ultralight trike

General information
- Type: Ultralight trike
- National origin: France
- Manufacturer: Ventura
- Status: Prototypes only
- Number built: probably only one

The Ventura 1200 was a proposed French ultralight trike that was designed by Ventura of La Frette, Isère. The aircraft was intended to be supplied as a complete ready-to-fly-aircraft and was announced at Blois 2007. It was shown again at Blois 2011, but it is likely only prototypes were produced before the company went out of business.

== Design and development ==
The Ventura 1200 was designed to comply with the Fédération Aéronautique Internationale microlight category, including the category's maximum gross weight of 450 kg (992 lb). The aircraft has a maximum gross weight of 450 kg (992 lb). It features a cable-braced hang glider-style high-wing, weight-shift controls, a two-seats-in-tandem open cockpit with an integral cockpit fairing, tricycle landing gear with wheel pants and a single engine in pusher configuration.

The prototype's fuselage was made from composites, with its double surface Air Creation iXess wing made from aluminum tubing and covered in Dacron sailcloth. The 10 m (32.8 ft) span wing is supported by a single tube-type kingpost and uses an "A" frame weight-shift control bar. The powerplant is a twin cylinder, air-cooled, four-stroke, dual-ignition 100 hp (75 kW) BMW R1200 motorcycle engine that was specially modified by the French engine specialty company Sodemo Moteurs. The propeller is driven via an in-house developed reduction drive.

The prototype has an empty weight of 245 kg (540 lb) and a gross weight of 450 kg (992 lb), giving a useful load of 205 kg (452 lb).

== Specifications (Ventura 1200) ==
Data from Bayerl

General characteristics

- Crew: one
- Capacity: one passenger
- Wingspan: 10.0 m (32 ft 10 in)
- Wing area: 15.0 m^{2} (161 sq ft)
- Empty weight: 245 kg (540 lb)
- Gross weight: 450 kg (992 lb)
- Powerplant: 1 × BMW R1200 twin cylinder, air-cooled, four stroke motorcycle engine, 75 kW (101 hp)
- Propellers: 3-bladed composite

Performance

- Maximum speed: 145 km/h (90 mph, 78 kn)
- Stall speed: 65 km/h (40 mph, 35 kn)
- Rate of climb: 7.5 m/s (1,480 ft/min)
- Wing loading: 30.0 kg/m^{2} (6.1 lb/sq ft)
