= Air Creation Trek =

French ultralight trike

Trek

General information
- Type: Ultralight trike
- National origin: France
- Manufacturer: Air Creation
- Status: In production (2013)

The Air Creation Trek is a French ultralight trike, designed by Air Creation of Aubenas. The aircraft is supplied as a complete ready-to-fly-aircraft.

== Design and development ==
Developed from the earlier Air Creation GTE, the Trek was designed to comply with the Fédération Aéronautique Internationale microlight category, including the category's maximum gross weight of 450 kg (992 lb). The Trek features a cable-braced hang glider-style high-wing, weight-shift controls, a two-seats-in-tandem, open cockpit, tricycle landing gear with wheel pants and a single engine in pusher configuration.

The aircraft is made from bolted-together aluminium tubing, and is commonly fitted with the Air Creation Fun 450 wing, which has a single surface covered in Dacron sailcloth. The 10 m (32.8 ft) span Fun wing is supported by a single tube-type kingpost and uses an "A" frame weight-shift control bar. The powerplant is a Japanese, twin cylinder, air-cooled, four-stroke, dual-ignition 60 hp (45 kW) HKS 700E engine. This engine choice provides similar reliability, smoothness and fuel economy to the Rotax 912, but at a much lower cost. With the HKS 700E engine the aircraft is designated as the Air Creation Trek 700E.

The Trek has an empty weight of 190 kg (419 lb) and a gross weight of 450 kg (992 lb), giving a useful load of 260 kg (573 lb). With full fuel of 38 litres (8.4 imp gal; 10 US gal) the payload is 233 kg (514 lb).

In addition to the Fun wing, the more high performance double surface Air Creation iXess wing can alternatively be fitted.

== Specifications (Trek 700E) ==
Data from Bayerl

General characteristics

- Crew: one
- Capacity: one passenger
- Wingspan: 10 m (32 ft 10 in)
- Wing area: 17.4 m^{2} (187 sq ft)
- Empty weight: 190 kg (419 lb)
- Fuel capacity: 38 litres (8.4 imp gal; 10 US gal)
- Powerplant: 1 × HKS 700E twin cylinder, air-cooled, four stroke aircraft engine, 45 kW (60 hp)
- Propellers: 3-bladed Ecoprop

Performance

- Maximum speed: 100 km/h (62 mph, 54 kn)
- Cruise speed: 90 km/h (56 mph, 49 kn)
- Stall speed: 53 km/h (33 mph, 29 kn)
- Rate of climb: 4 m/s (790 ft/min)
- Wing loading: 25.9 kg/m^{2} (5.3 lb/sq ft)
