= Air Creation Fun =

Fun
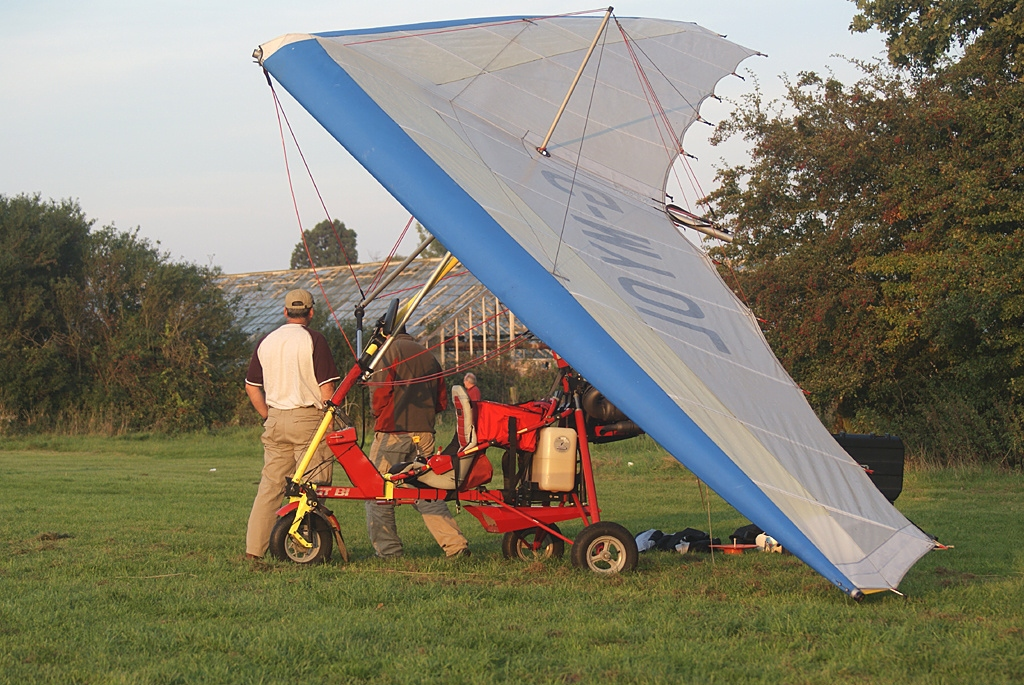

General information
- Type: Ultralight trike wing
- National origin: France
- Manufacturer: Air Creation
- Status: In production (2013)

The Air Creation Fun is a series of French single-surface ultralight trike wings, designed and produced by Air Création of Aubenas. The wing is widely used on Air Creation trikes as well as by other ultralight aircraft manufacturers.

== Design and development ==
The series are cable-braced, king post-equipped hang glider-style wings designed as docile beginner and flight training wings for single and two-place trikes. They come in two sizes, the Fun 450, named for its gross weight in kilograms and the Fun 14, named for its metric wing area.

The wings are made from bolted-together aluminium tubing, with its single surface wing covered in Trilam Dacron sailcloth, with a Mylar leading edge. The wing's crosstube is exposed and is of a floating design. The Fun 14 has a 10.0 m (32.8 ft) span, an aspect ratio of 7.4:1 and uses an "A" frame weight-shift control bar. The double surface portion is 40% and the wing folds using an "umbrella" system.

== Variants ==
Fun 14
Wing designed for single-place trikes, with an area of 13.5 m^{2} (145 sq ft).
Fun 450
Wing designed for two-place trikes, with a maximum gross weight of 450 kg (990 lb) and an area of 17.4 m^{2} (187 sq ft).
iFun 13
Second generation trike wing, designed for the Air Creation Pixel trike.
iFun 16
Second generation trike wing, designed for the Air Creation Skypper trike. Replaces the Fun 450 in the line.

== Applications ==
- Air Creation Racer, single-place
- Air Creation Pixel
- Air Creation Skypper
- Air Creation Trek, two-place
- Air Creation Twin

== Specifications (Fun 14) ==
Data from Bayerl and Air Creation

General characteristics

- Length: 3.4 m (11 ft 2 in) wing only
- Wingspan: 10.0 m (32 ft 10 in)
- Aspect ratio: 7.4:1
- Empty weight: 38 kg (84 lb) wing weight
- Gross weight: 250 kg (551 lb) maximum aircraft gross weight allowed

Performance

- Cruise speed: 90 km/h (56 mph, 49 kn)
- Stall speed: 40 km/h (25 mph, 22 kn)
- Never exceed speed: 110 km/h (68 mph, 59 kn)
- g limits: +4/-2
- Rate of sink: 1.6 m/s (310 ft/min)
- Wing loading: 25.0 kg/m^{2} (5.1 lb/sq ft) maximum
