= Air Creation BioniX =

French ultralight trike

BioniX
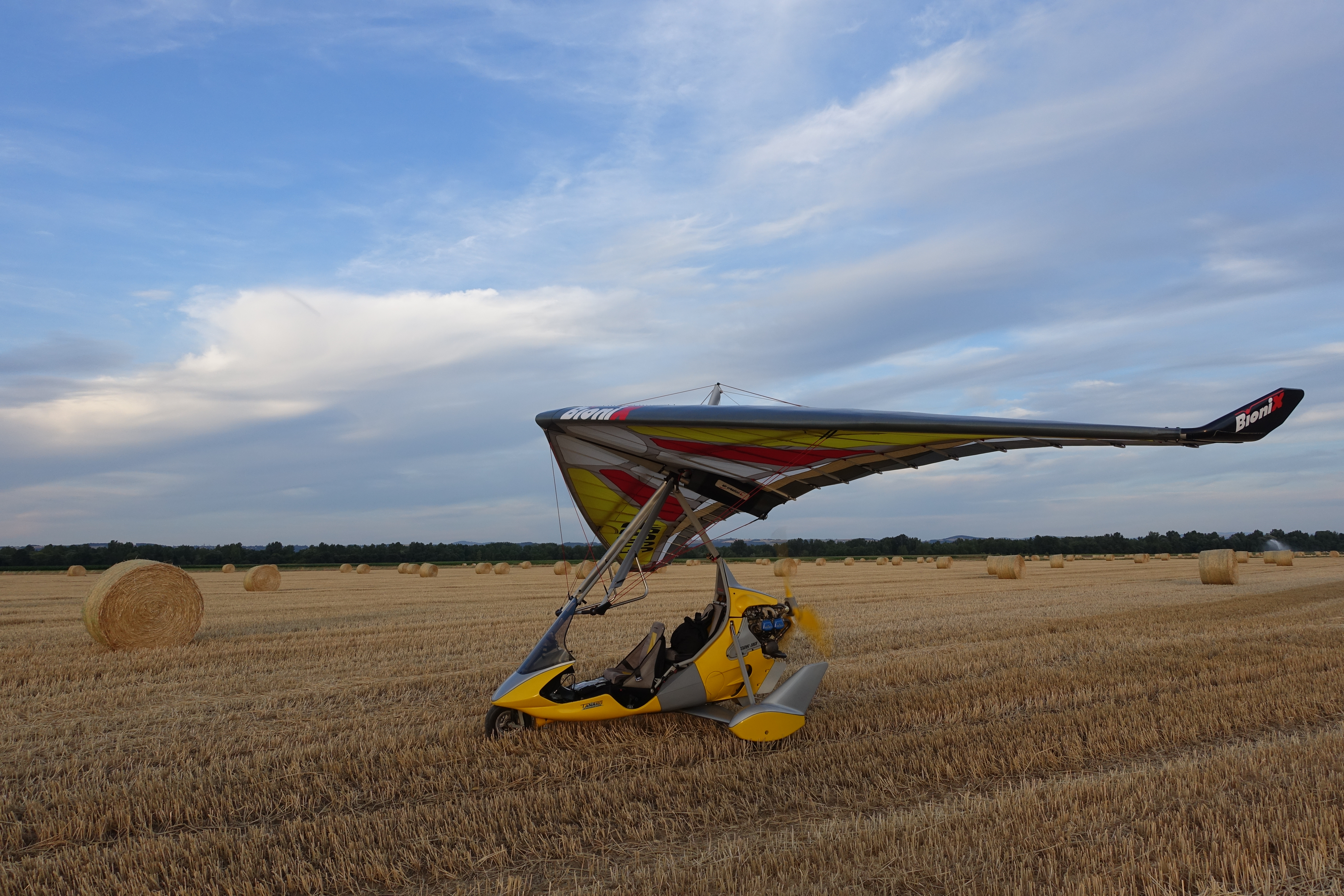
- Air Creation Tanarg with a Bionix wing

General information
- Type: Ultralight trike wing
- National origin: France
- Manufacturer: Air Creation
- Status: In production (2013)

The Air Creation BioniX is a French double-surface ultralight trike wing, designed and produced by Air Creation of Aubenas. The wing is widely used on Air Creation trikes.

== Design and development ==
The wing is a cable-braced, king post-equipped hang glider-style wing designed as advanced, top-of-the-line wing for two-place trikes. It comes in two sizes, 13 m^{2} (140 sq ft) and 15.1 m^{2} (163 sq ft).

The wing is made from bolted-together aluminium tubing, with its double surface wing covered in Dacron sailcloth. In its 15.1 m size it has a 9.85 m (32.3 ft) span wing, a nose angle of 130°, an aspect ratio of 6.4:1 and uses an "A" frame weight-shift control bar. The wing mounts small winglets. The design incorporates a unique "corset" system that allows the pilot to adjust the wing's trailing edge geometry in flight to optimize performance. This results in a large speed range and good handling characteristics in turbulence, without heavy roll control.

== Variants ==
BioniX 13
13 m^{2} (140 sq ft) wing area version
BioniX 15
15.1 m^{2} (163 sq ft) wing area version

== Applications ==
- Air Creation Tanarg
- Air Creation Skypper

== Specifications (BioniX 15) ==
Data from Bayerl and Air Creation

General characteristics

- Wingspan: 9.85 m (32 ft 4 in)
- Wing area: 15.1 m^{2} (163 sq ft)
- Aspect ratio: 6.4:1
- Empty weight: 56 kg (123 lb) wing weight
- Gross weight: 472.5 kg (1,042 lb) maximum aircraft gross weight allowed

Performance

- Maximum speed: 157 km/h (98 mph, 85 kn)
- Cruise speed: 135 km/h (84 mph, 73 kn)
- Stall speed: 55 km/h (34 mph, 30 kn)
- Wing loading: 31.29 kg/m^{2} (6.41 lb/sq ft) maximum
