= Air Creation Racer =

French ultralight trike

Racer
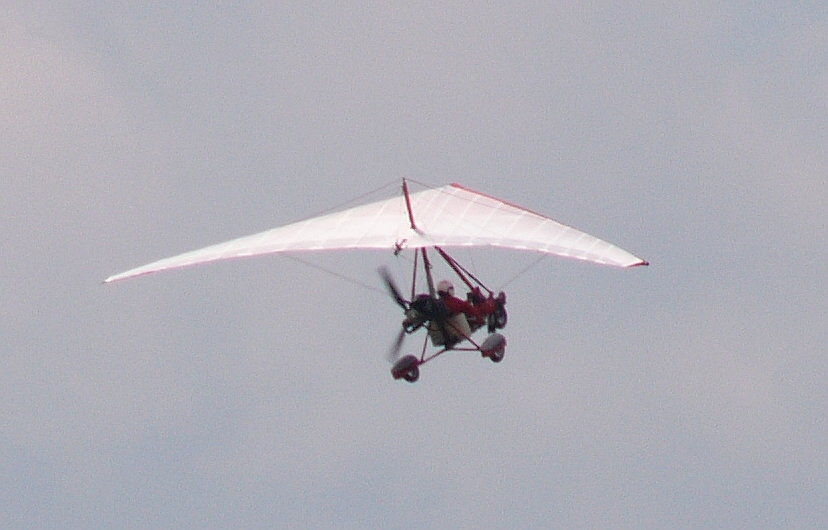
- Racer 503

General information
- Type: Ultralight trike
- National origin: France
- Manufacturer: Air Creation
- Status: Production completed

History
- Manufactured: 1985-2010

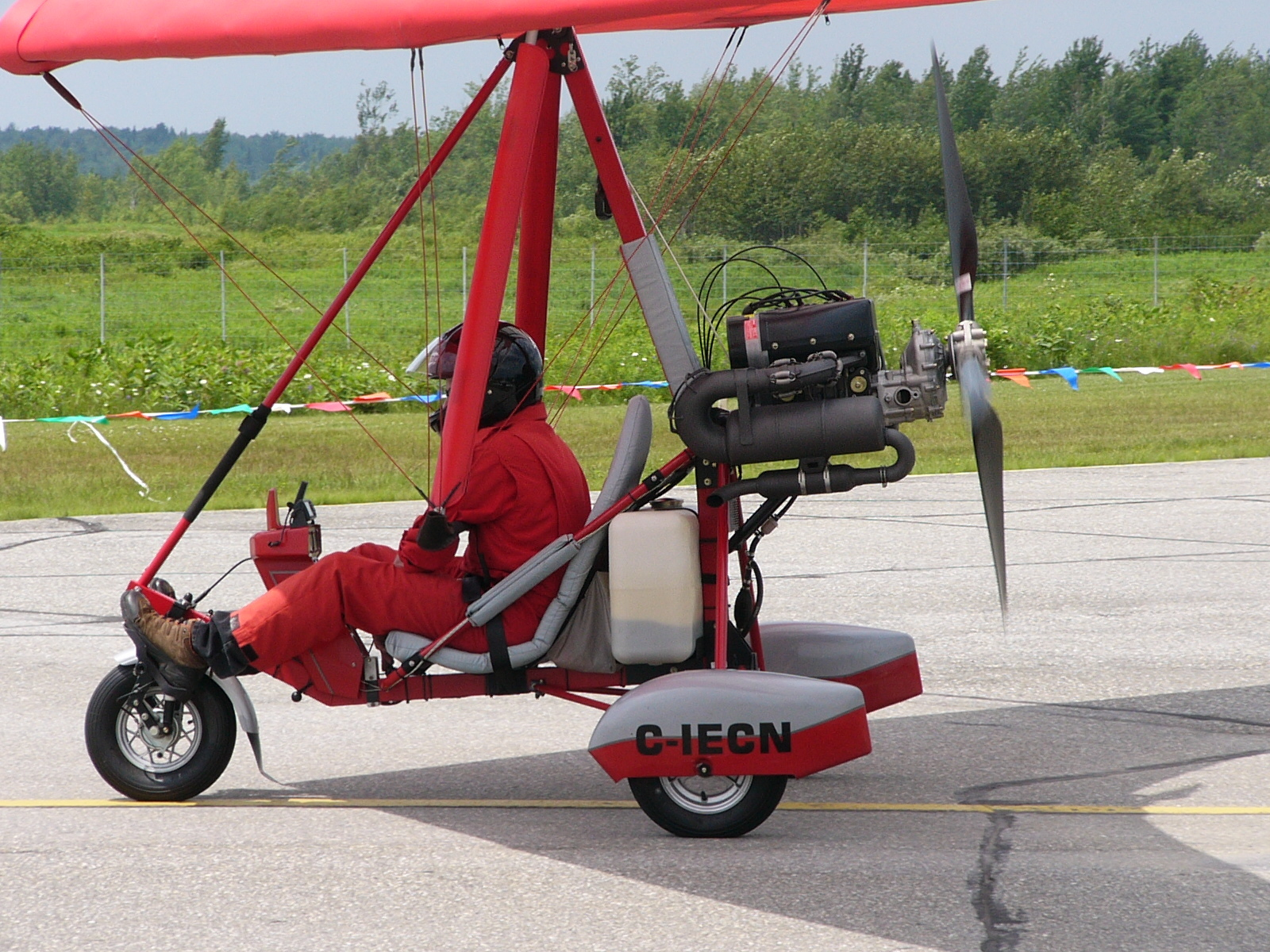
Air Creation Racer powered by a Rotax 503

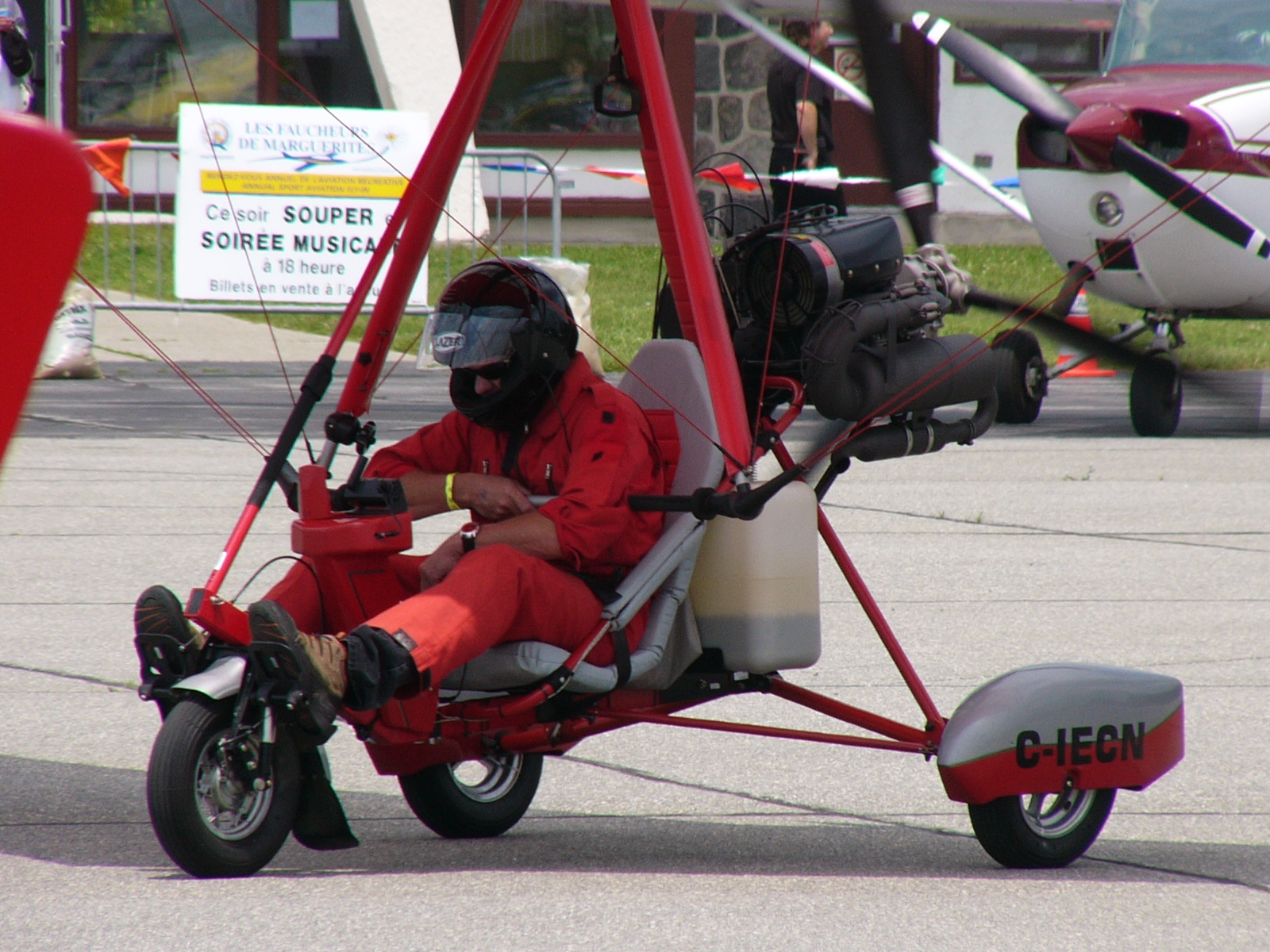
Air Creation Racer

The Air Creation Racer is a French single-seat, weight-shift control ultralight trike that was built by Air Creation of Aubenas between 1986 and 2010. It was available in kit form for amateur construction or as a completed aircraft.

== Design and development ==
The Racer was developed as a lightweight trike that can qualify for the US FAR 103 Ultralight Vehicles category, including its 254 lb (115 kg) maximum empty weight requirement, when equipped with a light wing and engine.

The carriage is of aluminium construction and incorporates suspension on all three wheels. The nosewheel-mounted drum brake is foot-pedal actuated. The nosewheel is also steerable and features a mudguard. The carriage features baggage stowage pockets and optionally a cockpit fairing and wheel pants. The carriage can be equipped with several different wings. When fitted with the Air Creation Fun 14 40% double surface wing, the aircraft version is called the Fun Racer. The Fun wing is covered in Trilam sailcloth and allows a maximum speed of 54 mph (87 km/h) and a service ceiling of 15,000 ft (4,572 m)

The Racer's acceptable power range is 40 to 65 hp (30 to 48 kW) and the 40 hp (30 kW) Rotax 447, 50 hp (37 kW) Rotax 503 and the 64 hp (48 kW) Rotax 582 engines are used. By 2011 the Rotax 447 and 503 were out of production and Air Creation offered a version of the Racer without an included engine so that the owner could locate a used 447, 503 or other suitable powerplant. The estimated assembly time from the supplied kit is 40 hours.

Reviewer Andre Cliche said of the Racer, "Quick and agile, the Fun Racer shows all the refinement expected from European trikes...This is a well engineered trike and company support is excellent."

== Variants ==
Fun Racer
Racer carriage equipped with the Fun 14 wing. This wing provides docile handling and ease of rigging. Standard empty weight of 247 lb (112 kg) when equipped with the Rotax 447 engine.
XP Racer
Racer carriage equipped with the XP11 racing wing, giving a 75 mph (121 km/h) cruise speed. Standard empty weight of 271 lb (123 kg) when equipped with the Rotax 503 engine.

Variant	Wing Type	Engine	Empty Weight	Cruise Speed
Fun Racer	Air Création Fun 14 (40% double-surface Trilam)	Rotax 447 (40 hp)	~247 lb (112 kg)	Max ~54 mph (87 km/h)
XP Racer	XP11 racing wing	Rotax 503 (50 hp)	~271 lb (123 kg)	Cruise ~75 mph (121 km/h)

== Specifications (Fun Racer) ==
Data from Cliche and Purdy

General characteristics

- Crew: one
- Length: 9 ft 0 in (2.74 m)
- Wingspan: 33 ft 0 in (10.06 m)
- Wing area: 145 sq ft (13.5 m^{2})
- Empty weight: 246 lb (112 kg)
- Gross weight: 600 lb (272 kg)
- Fuel capacity: 5 US gallons (19 L; 4.2 imp gal)
- Powerplant: 1 × Rotax 447 , 40 hp (30 kW)

Performance

- Maximum speed: 54 mph (87 km/h, 47 kn)
- Cruise speed: 45 mph (72 km/h, 39 kn)
- Stall speed: 22 mph (35 km/h, 19 kn)
- Service ceiling: 15,000 ft (4,600 m)
- Rate of climb: 1,100 ft/min (5.6 m/s)

== See also ==
Aircraft of comparable role, configuration, and era

- Rainbow Aerotrike
