= Air Creation GT =

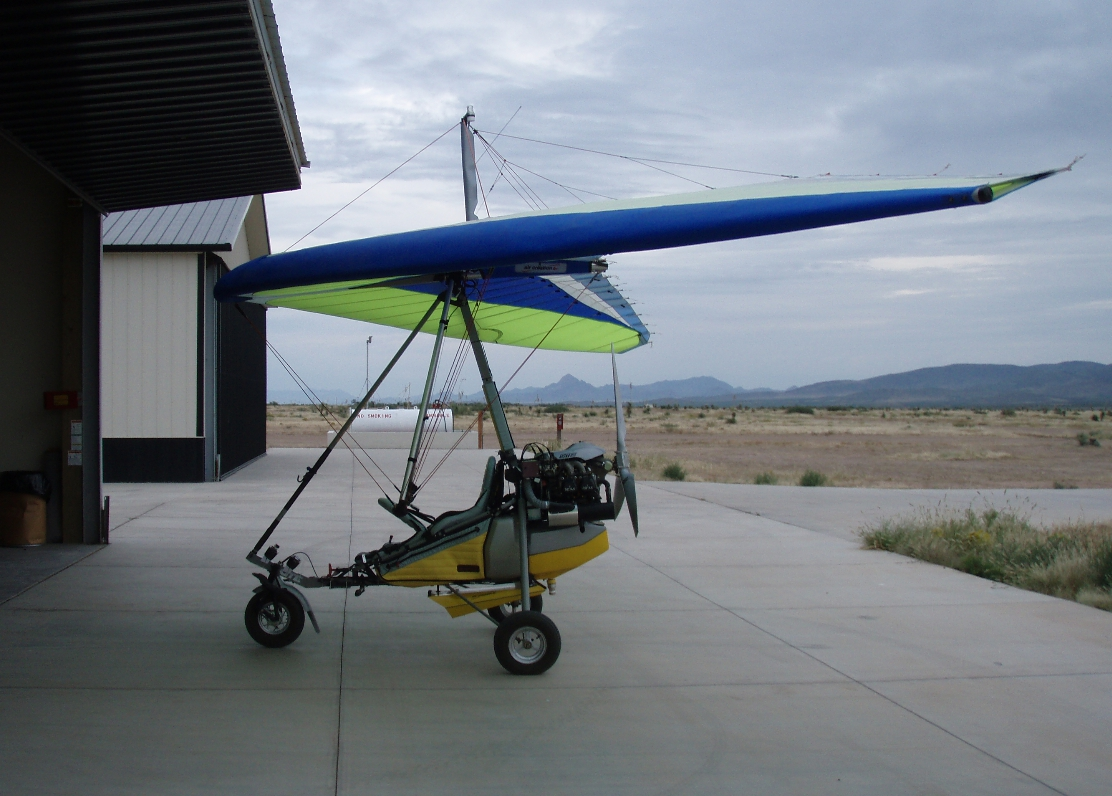
- Air Creation GTE

General information
- Type: Ultralight trike
- National origin: France
- Manufacturer: Air Creation
- Status: Production completed
- Number built: Over 2000

History
- Variant: Air Creation Trek

The Air Creation GT and Clipper are a series of French two-seat flying wing ultralight trikes that was designed and produced by Air Creation.

== Design and development ==
The GT series features a cable-braced hang glider-style high-wing, weight-shift controls, a tandem-seat, open cockpit, tricycle landing gear and a single engine in pusher configuration.

The aircraft is made from bolted-together aluminium tubing, with its double-surface wing covered in Trilam sailcloth. Its 189 sq ft (17.6 m^{2}) area wing is supported by a single tube-type kingpost and uses an "A" frame control bar. A variety of wings and engines has been fitted to the GT carriage, to form new variants.

When equipped with a cockpit fairing, the aircraft is called the Clipper.

The GT series can be fitted with the later-designed Air Creation NuviX wing.

The GT was replaced in production by the Air Creation Skypper.

== Variants ==
GT-BI
Version with XP-15 wing, center of gravity adjustable sliding keel, pneumatic suspension of all three landing gear wheels and a steerable nose wheel equipped with a drum brake. The engine is a Rotax 503 of 50 hp (37 kW)
Kiss 400 GTE 582
Version with the Kiss 400 wing, rated for 400 kg (882 lb) and Rotax 582 engine of 64 hp (48 kW)
Kiss 450 GTE 582
Version with the Kiss 450 wing, rated for 450 kg (992 lb) and Rotax 582 engine of 64 hp (48 kW)
Mild GTE 582 Float
Version with the Mild wing and Rotax 582 engine of 64 hp (48 kW) and dual floats for water operations.
XP-12 Buggy 582 SL
Version with the XP-12 wing and Rotax 582 engine of 64 hp (48 kW) and float for water operations.
MILD-GTE 503 SL
Version with the MILD wing of 178 sq ft (16.5 m^{2}) and Rotax 503 engine of 50 hp (37 kW)
MILD-GTE 582
Version with the MILD wing of 178 sq ft (16.5 m^{2}) and Rotax 582 engine of 64 hp (48 kW)
XP-GTE 582 SL
Version with the XP wing and Rotax 582 engine of 64 hp (48 kW)
XP-Buggy
Version with the XP wing and Rotax 582 engine of 64 hp (48 kW)
iXess Clipper 582
Version with a fairing, the iXess wing and Rotax 582 engine of 64 hp (48 kW).
XP-17 Clipper 912
Version with a fairing, the XP-17 wing and Rotax 912 four stroke engine of 80 hp (60 kW).

== Specifications (MILD-GTE 503 SL) ==
Data from Kitplanes

General characteristics

- Crew: one
- Capacity: one passenger
- Length: 2.4 m (8 ft)
- Wingspan: 10 m (33 ft)
- Height: 3.7 m (12 ft)
- Wing area: 16.5 m^{2} (178 sq ft)
- Empty weight: 172 kg (379 lb)
- Gross weight: 450 kg (992 lb)
- Fuel capacity: 15 U.S. gallons (57 L; 12 imp gal)
- Powerplant: 1 × Rotax 503 , 37 kW (50 hp)

Performance

- Cruise speed: 80 km/h (50 mph, 43 kn)
- Service ceiling: 4,900 m (16,000 ft)
- Rate of climb: 3.70 m/s (728 ft/min)
