= R1200 =

R1200 may refer to any of the following motorcycles:

== BMW ==
- R1200C
- R1200GS
- R1200R
- R1200RT
- R1200S
- R1200ST

== Kawasaki ==
- ZZ-R1200
