= Air Création =

French aircraft manufacturer

- Industry: Aerospace
- Founded: 1982
- Headquarters: Aubenas, France
- Products: Ultralight aircraft
- Website: www.aircreation.fr

Air Création is a French manufacturer of ultralight and light-sport aircraft. The company was founded in 1982 and has since produced more than 5,500 aircraft. Current product portfolio includes the two seat Tanarg and the GTE Trek. The single-seat FAR 103 compliant Racer was produced for 25 years, from 1985 to 2010.

The company is located at Aubenas airfield in Ardèche, France.

== Gallery ==
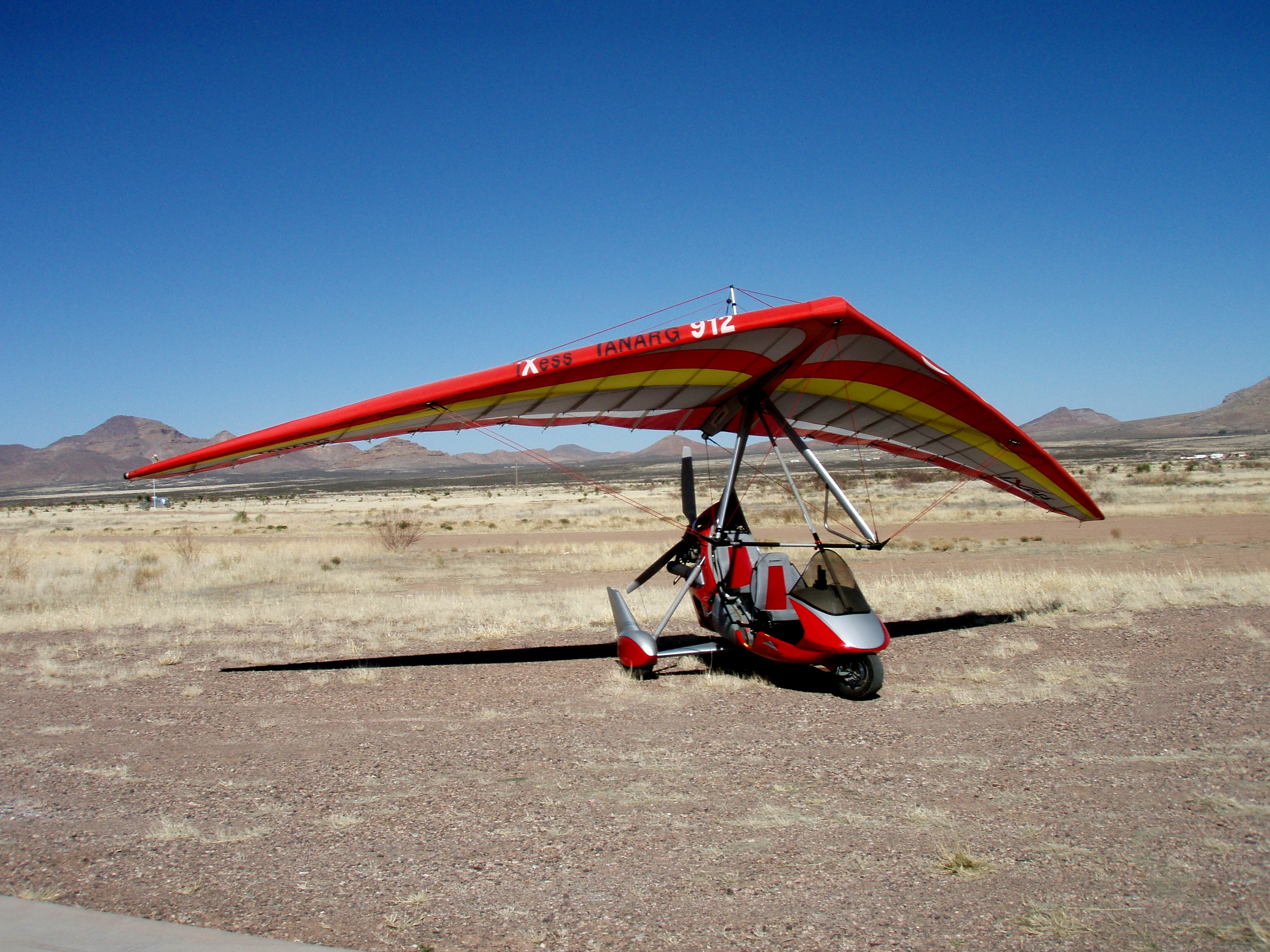
Air Creation Tanarg with Rotax 912 engine

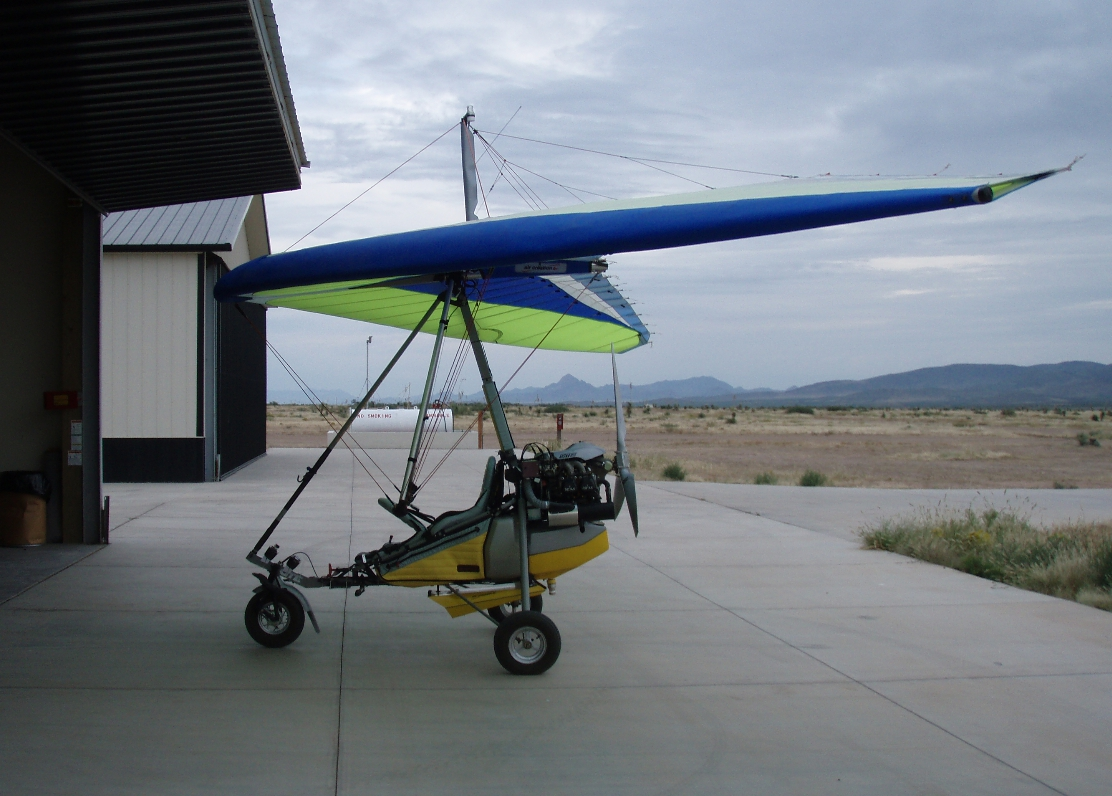
Air Creation GT with Rotax 912 engine

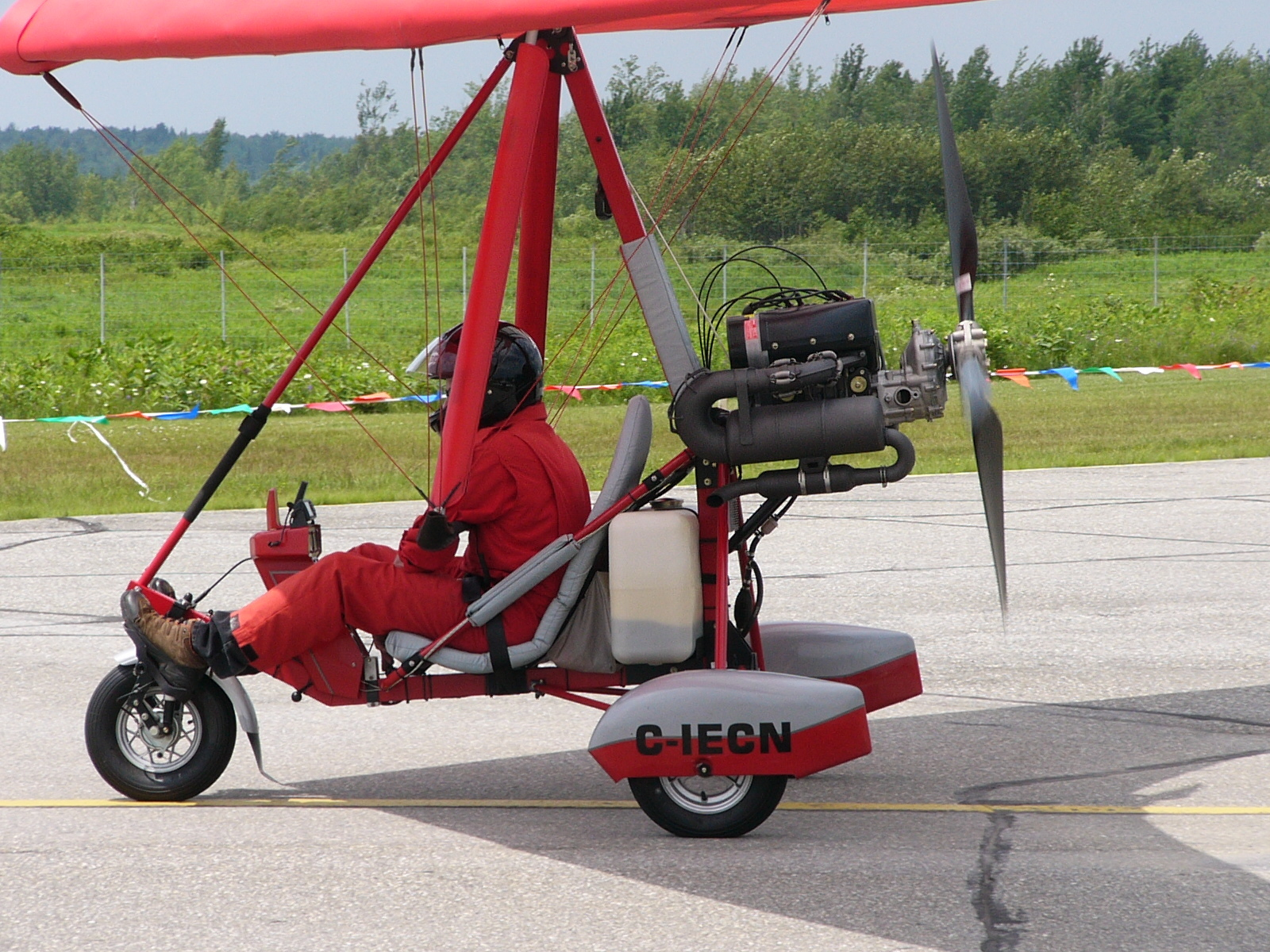
Air Creation Racer trike with Rotax 503 engine

== Aircraft ==
- Air Creation Clipper
- Air Creation GT
- Air Creation Pixel
- Air Creation Racer
- Air Creation Skypper
- Air Creation Tanarg
- Air Creation Trek
- Air Creation Twin
