= Slingsby Skylark =

British single-seat glider, 1953

T.37 Skylark 1
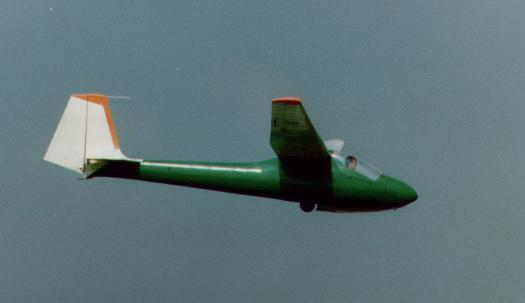
- Slingsby Skylark 3

General information
- Type: Glider
- National origin: United Kingdom
- Manufacturer: Slingsby Sailplanes
- Designer: John Reussner
- Number built: 2

History
- First flight: 1953
- Variants: Skylark 2, Skylark 3, Skylark 4

The Slingsby T.37 Skylark 1 was a small low-cost sailplane built during 1952-3 at Kirbymoorside, Yorkshire by Slingsby Sailplanes.

== Design and development ==
Fred Slingsby wanted to take a larger slice of the glider market with a small, low-cost sailplane with better than average performance. The key to this ethos was that smaller aircraft used fewer materials, and modern aerofoil sections could give much better performance. Slingsby appointed John Reussner as draughtsman and designer for the T.37 Skylark. The relatively new five-digit NACA series of aerofoil sections was chosen because they would give low drag over a wide airspeed range ("wide Drag Bucket"). To maintain laminar flow and gain the benefit of the NACA sections, it was necessary to build the wings very accurately and ensure that the surface remained true during the life of the aircraft. This was achieved by using the low-density but stiff Gaboon plywood. The leading edge was fashioned from accurately-spindled hollow spruce members with rebates to accept the gaboon ply wing panels extending back to the rear spar, leaving only a small area to be covered with fabric. The fuselage was a simple structure built up from struts and covered with plywood back to the rear of the wing support pylon, and fabric covering over the rear fuselage. Ply-covered tail surfaces and fabric-covered control surfaces completed the airframe. Further weight and cost was saved by not fitting a landing wheel.

== History ==
The Skylark was successful to a limited degree but it introduced Slingsby to new manufacturing techniques and the vagaries of laminar flow. As with modern gliders any reduction in laminar flow caused a disproportionate increase in drag, reinforcing the need for careful handling, cleaning and polishing, and avoiding rain while flying. Despite the promising performance of the T.37 Skylark the British gliding fraternity convinced Fred Slingsby to modify his thinking and produce gliders with lower wing loadings, through increased span and wing area.

== Specifications ==
Data from British Gliders and Sailplanes 1922-1970, Slingsby Sailplanes, and The World's Sailplanes:Die Segelflugzeuge der Welt:Les Planeurs du Monde

General characteristics

- Crew: 1
- Length: 20 ft 11 in (6.38 m)
- Wingspan: 45 ft 0 in (13.72 m)
- Wing area: 113 sq ft (10.5 m^{2})
- Aspect ratio: 17.9
- Airfoil: centre section NACA 63_{3}-618 (laminar flow back to 30% chord), tip NACA 64_{3}-618 (laminar flow back to @ 40% chord)
- Empty weight: 433 lb (196.5 kg)
- Gross weight: 666 lb (302 kg)

Performance

- Stall speed: 35 kn (40 mph, 64 km/h)
- Never exceed speed: 113 kn (130 mph, 209 km/h)
- Aerotow speed: 70 kn (130 km/h; 81 mph)
- Winch launch speed: 60 kn (110 km/h; 69 mph)
- g limits: +8.97
- Rate of sink: 148 ft/min (0.75 m/s) at 37 kn (69 km/h; 43 mph)
- Lift-to-drag: 27:1 at 42 kn (78 km/h; 48 mph)
- Wing loading: 5.9 lb/sq ft (28.8 kg/m^{2})

== See also ==
Aircraft of comparable role, configuration, and era

- SZD-22 Mucha Standard

Related lists

- List of gliders
