= Slingsby Kirby Gull =

T.12 Gull
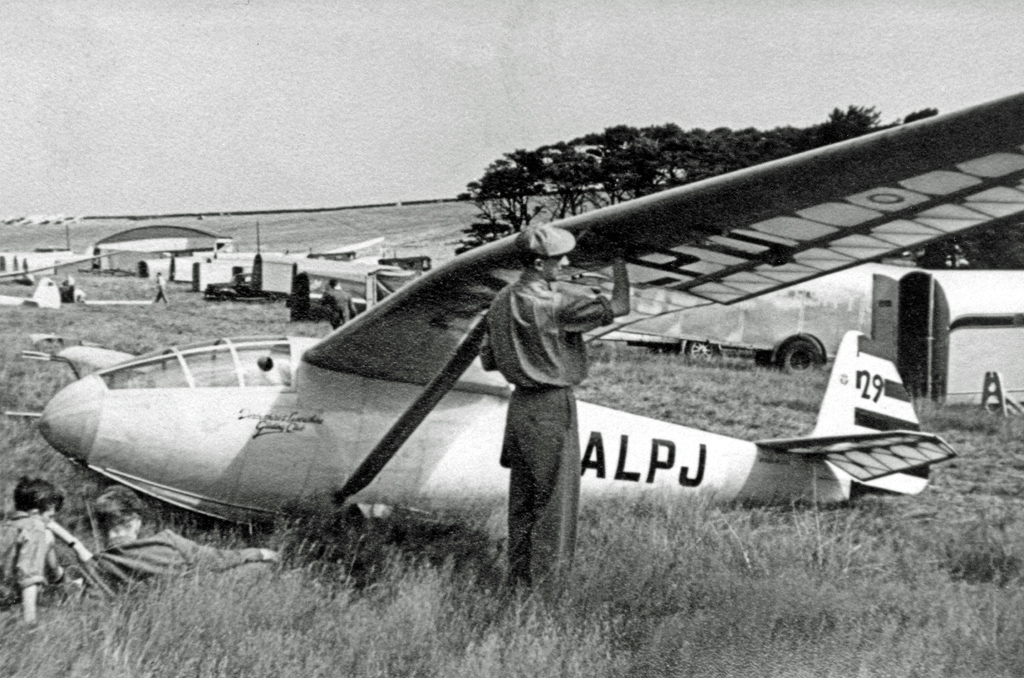
- The sixth Gull I at Great Hucklow in 1949 when operated by the Derbyshire & Lancashire Gliding Club

General information
- Type: Glider
- National origin: United Kingdom
- Manufacturer: Slingsby Sailplanes
- Designer: Fred Slingsby
- Number built: 11

History
- First flight: March 1938

The Slingsby T.12 Gull was a British single-seat glider designed and built by Slingsby Sailplanes and first flown in 1938.

== Development ==
In the late 1930s the gliding movement in the UK did not receive the support from the government that was forthcoming in other European states. Fred Slingsby designed the Type 12 Gull to be relatively inexpensive and easy to fly in the hands of the inexperienced pilots in the UK. Slingsby had had a bad experience with the Type 9 King Kite entering incipient spins at low airspeed which was ascribed to the use of a NACA 4312 aerofoil section at the wing-tips, so he designed the Gull with a modified RAF 34 profile at the tips. The cause of the wing drop problem on the King Kite was later found to be inaccurate manufacture, but the Gull retained the modified RAF 34 section.

Construction of the Gull aircraft was of semi-monocoque wood and plywood throughout, with a mixture of plywood and fabric skinning and covering. The wings were skinned with plywood forward of the main spar to form torsion boxes which increased their rigidity. They had a distinctive gull wing form, as the inner 2 metres carried marked dihedral out to the attachment points of the lift struts to the wing spars. Beyond, the wings lacked dihedral. The rectangular planform of the inner wings included the gulled portion and 2 metres beyond, with spoilers in the upper surface outboard of the gull joint in some later aircraft. Ailerons filled the trailing edge of the tapered outer wings.

The cockpit was enclosed with a neatly faired multi-panel canopy which was removed for entry and egress. Ten Gulls were built, nine by Slingsby at Kirbymoorside and one by Herman Kursawe in the United States, from plans supplied by Slingsby.

The design was developed in 1939 to include what Slingsby called the cantilever Gull, designated as the T15. More commonly known as the Gull III, it had a slightly higher performance, and was fitted with spoilers on the upper surfaces of the wing. Built in 1939, it was not until January 1940 that the type first flew, and was such a success that Slingsby intended to put the type into production once the War was over.

With the tight post-war economy within Britain, gliders of simplified production quickly became a factor in being able to produce cost-effective sailplanes. This led to the Gull 4, which had a more conventional, less complicated straight wing.

== Operational history ==
In 1939 a Gull, widely known as the Blue Gull became the first glider to fly from England to France, cross channel. The pilot was G. Stephenson.

The only Gull III to be built survived the war, and along with the Petrel was regarded as one of the prettiest sailplanes to come out of Slingsby's doors. It went on to have a long and distinguished career, and was owned at one point by Prince Bira of Siam, who was at the time the World Motor Racing Champion. Bira had bought the Gull III in 1944 and flew it in the company of his dog, a small white West Highland Terrier called "Titch", on many epic flights, including one to 12000 ft.

The Gull III was later bought by a syndicate at the Oxford Gliding Club operating out of Weston on the Green. After a long rebuild, it was finally flown again in 1973. Its C of A expired again in July 1974 because its wing had been damaged by damp (casein glue failure) during the previous winter, when it had been left out in its closed trailer at St. Mary's Farm, Clifton, near Deddington, Oxon. Expertly restored in the 1980s by the late Mike Beach, it was initially loaned to Brooklands Museum as a non-flying exhibit but was later bought by the Museum in 1998.

There is one other Gull III in existence. Often wittingly referred to as the Gull 3 ½, this Gull is a faithful replica that was made from drawings that had come from Slingsby's during the 1970s, with the drawings being developed for the project by a worker at Slingsby's. The project was the brain-child of the late Mike Garnett, and completed by members of the Bowland Forest Gliding Club. It flew from Bowland Forest until 2011 when it was purchased by the current owner and moved to Lincolnshire. This Gull is currently the only airworthy example of either the Gull 1 or Gull III left in Britain. The only other airworthy Gull 1 went to the United States in 2010.

== Aircraft on display ==
- A Gull 1, originally the prototype and sold to Australia before World War II and later registered VH-GHL is currently on display at the Aviation Heritage Museum in Perth, Australia.
- A Gull 1, BGA number 902 is on display at the National Museum of Scotland, Edinburgh.
- A Gull 1, N41829 built by Hermann Kursawe in the USA has been restored and is about to be put on display at the National Soaring Museum at Elmira, NY.
- The sole Gull III is on display at the Gliding Heritage Centre, Lasham Airfield Hampshire.

== Variants ==
T.12 Gull
Initial prototype and nine production gliders with strutted gull wings.
T.14 Gull II
Enlarged Gull with two seats side by side, only one built.
T.15 Gull III
Also known as the Cantilever Gull, a single Gull built during the outbreak of Second World War and first flying in 1940, without struts supporting the wings. It was rebuilt post war after a crash by Hawkridge Aircraft Co, Ltd. as the Hawkridge Kittiwake. It later was used at the Oxford Gliding Club.

== Specifications (Gull 1) ==
Data from Slingsby Sailplanes and The World's Sailplanes:Die Segelflugzeuge der Welt:Les Planeurs du Monde

General characteristics

- Crew: 1
- Length: 21 ft 8 in (6.61 m)
- Wingspan: 50 ft 2 in (15.3 m)
- Wing area: 160.0 sq ft (14.86 m^{2})
- Aspect ratio: 15.8
- Airfoil: root:NACA 4416, tip:RAF34 (modified)
- Empty weight: 380 lb (172.5 kg) equipped
- Max takeoff weight: 625 lb (283.5 kg)

Performance

- Never exceed speed: 80 mph (129 km/h, 70 kn)
- Aerotow speed: 60 mph (97 km/h; 52 kn)
- Winch launch speed: 50 mph (80 km/h; 43 kn)
- g limits: +4.9
- Maximum glide ratio: 24 at 42 mph (68 km/h; 36 kn)
- Rate of sink: 142 ft/min (0.72 m/s) at 37 mph (60 km/h; 32 kn)
- Wing loading: 3.9 lb/sq ft (19.1 kg/m^{2})

== See also ==
Aircraft of comparable role, configuration, and era

- Slingsby T.9 King Kite

Related lists

- List of aircraft
- List of gliders
