= Slingsby Falcon 4 =

British two-seat glider, 1946

Falcon 4
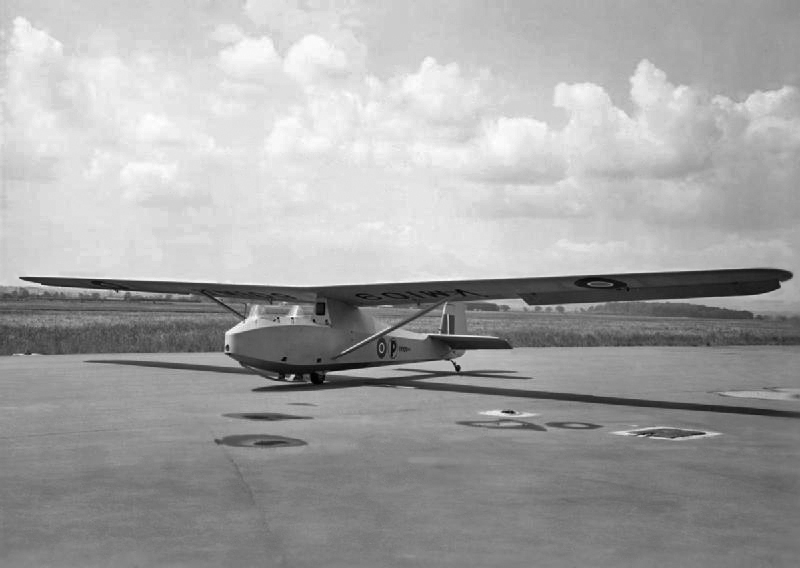
- Slingsby Falcon 4 (VM109)

General information
- Type: Training glider
- National origin: United Kingdom
- Manufacturer: Slingsby Sailplanes Ltd.
- Number built: 3

History
- First flight: April 1946

The Slingsby T.24 Falcon 4 was a two-seat training glider designed in the UK just after World War II for ATC use. It was judged too expensive for production and only three were completed.

== Development ==
Despite the shared name, the Slingsby Falcon 4 was a completely different aircraft from the early Falcon 1, 2 and 3, all derived from the Schleicher Falke from about 1930 and notable for their swept wings. In contrast, the Falcon 4 was a tandem seat training glider intended for an ATC role and built to Air Ministry specification TX.8/45. It used conventional wooden construction; all three Falcon 4s were built by Martin Hearn Ltd. of Hooton Park, Cheshire.

The wing of the Falcon 4 was of quite low aspect ratio, with a straight, unswept leading edge, rounded copper bound tips and straight taper on the trailing edge. The first two aircraft had flaps extending over almost all the trailing edge not occupied by the ailerons, but the third replaced flaps with spoilers. The wings were pylon mounted with lift struts from the spar to the lower fuselage longerons. The pylon only extended forward to the spar, leaving space for the rear, open, cockpit under the wing; the forward cockpit was close to the nose. Behind the wing the pylon dropped away gently above the flat sided fuselage to the tail. The braced, straight tapered tailplane was mounted on top of the fuselage and placed far enough forward that the divided elevators were ahead of the rudder hinge, avoiding the need for a large cut out for rudder movement. The fin was small, but the horn balanced rudder was generous in area, slightly pointed and with a rounded, copper bound trailing edge. The undercarriage was conventional, with a nose skid, fixed monowheel and small tailwheel.

The first flight was in April 1946 and two other prototypes followed, but the aircraft was expensive to produce and offered no advantage over the Slingsby T.21 and no orders resulted. The second prototype was written off in an accident in December 1946, but in 1948, owing to delays in the T21 entering service, the remaining two Falcon 4s were tested in order to allow them to be cleared for service with the ATC. The third prototype was written off during these trials in August 1948, but in 1949, the remaining Falcon 4 entered service with the ATC gliding school at Detling. It was sold in March 1953.

== Specifications ==
Data from Ellison 1971, p. 194

General characteristics

- Crew: 2
- Length: 28 ft 8.75 in (8.7567 m)
- Wingspan: 54 ft 4 in (16.56 m)
- Wing area: 266 sq ft (24.7 m^{2})
- Aspect ratio: 10.8
- Airfoil: NACA 2R,12
- Empty weight: 775 lb (352 kg)
- Gross weight: 1,200 lb (544 kg)

Performance

- Wing loading: 3.46 lb/sq ft (16.9 kg/m^{2})
