= Slingsby Petrel =

British single-seat glider, 1938

Petrel
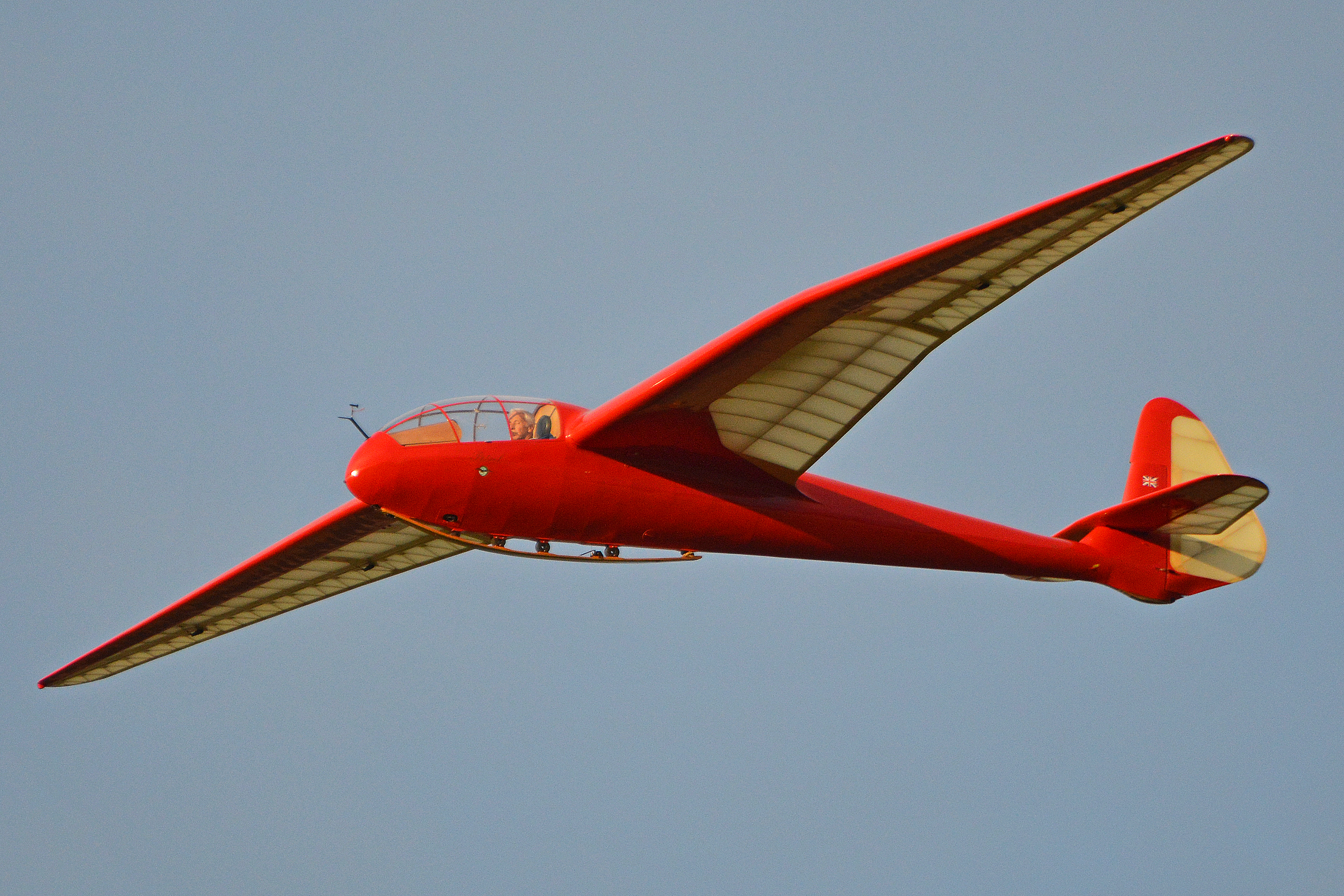
- Slingsby Petrel 'BGA651' at the 2015 'Best of British' flying evening, Old Warden

General information
- Type: Competition sailplane
- National origin: United Kingdom
- Manufacturer: Slingsby Sailplanes Ltd.
- Number built: 3

History
- First flight: December 1938

The Slingsby T.13 Petrel was a British single-seat competition glider built by Slingsby Sailplanes just before World War II.

== Development ==
The Slingsby Petrel was a development of the German Schleicher Rhönadler designed by Hans Jacobs. It was a single-seat high-performance sailplane with a span of a little under 18 metres, built of wood with a mixture of plywood and fabric covering. It had high cantilever gull wings, though the inner section dihedral was modest. They carried straight taper to fine and rounded tips and ailerons that extended over more than half the span. There were neither flaps nor airbrakes.

The fuselage had its maximum diameter near the nose, where the long, multipiece canopy blended in smoothly, ending at the wing leading edge. Behind the wings the fuselage tapered and became slender at the tail. The fin and the tailplane were both small in area; the rudder was large, aerodynamically balanced and extended down to the keel. The elevators were tapered, with a cut out for rudder movement. The undercarriage consisted of just a main skid from below the front of the cockpit glazing to mid chord plus a tail bumper.

== Operational history ==
The Petrel prototype first flew in December 1938. This aircraft crashed at Camphill, Derbyshire in the British National Championships of July 1939, killing its pilot, the speedway rider Frank Charles. Two more were built and flew for several decades after World War II with clubs in England and Ireland. One of them was a competitor at the 1953 British National Championships, held again at Camphill, by then known as Great Hucklow, after being bowled over in transit by a Rotherham trolley-bus.

== Surviving aircraft ==
Only one Petrel, BGA651, the final aircraft, remains airworthy in 2013. It was restored by its owner, Graham Saw. It flies regularly at Vintage Glider Club meetings and has been displayed at Old Warden on Shuttleworth Collection open days.

The second Petrel, BGA418, has been restored back to its original varnished look. It is flown at various glider meets throughout the U.S.. It can be seen on display, at the Western Antique Aeroplane and Automobile Museum (WAAAM) in Hood River, Oregon, United States.

== Specifications ==
Data from Ellison 1971, p. 183 and The World's Sailplanes:Die Segelflugzeuge der Welt:Les Planeurs du Monde

General characteristics

- Crew: 1
- Length: 23 ft 9 in (7.25 m)
- Wingspan: 56 ft 11 in (17.34 m)
- Wing area: 180.0 sq ft (16.72 m^{2})
- Aspect ratio: 17.9
- Airfoil: Göttingen 535
- Empty weight: 440 lb (199.5 kg) equipped
- Max takeoff weight: 638 lb (289.5 kg)

Performance

- g limits: +6
- Maximum glide ratio: 27 at 42 mph (68 km/h; 36 kn)
- Rate of sink: 106 ft/min (0.54 m/s) minimum, at 35 mph (56 km/h; 30 kn)
- Wing loading: 3.6 lb/sq ft (17.5 kg/m^{2})

== See also ==
Related lists

- List of gliders
