= TX3 =

TX3 may refer to:

- Texas's 3rd congressional district
- Texas State Highway 3
- Blue Bird TX3, a schoolbus
- Ford Laser TX3, a compact car
- Slingsby Cadet TX.3, a training glider aircraft
