= Slingsby T.20 =

British two-seat glider, 1944

T.20

General information
- Type: Glider
- National origin: United Kingdom
- Manufacturer: Slingsby Aviation
- Number built: 1

History
- First flight: 1944

The Slingsby T.20 was a British glider designed and built by Slingsby that first flew in 1944.

== Design and development ==
The Type 20 was probably the least well known Slingsby product, yet it arguably had the most exciting flying life. The design started life in parallel with the larger Type 21, as a private venture inexpensive robust two-seat training glider intended for the Air Training Corps. The aircraft borrowed design elements from several predecessors, including an enlarged wing from the T.8 Kirby Tutor, and a fuselage, reminiscent of the early Falcons, with cabane struts in front of the rear cockpit, which sat in front of the narrow cabane structure under the centre-section, as well as an additional cockpit in the nose.

=== Flight trials ===
Flying with the T.20 began in 1944 with no reported problems, the prototype languished at Sutton Bank Gliding Club, emerging only to fly the occasional illegal soaring flight, the pilots that flew the T.20 all praising its handling. No production order was forthcoming however.

=== Preparation for carrier trials ===
During the intensive carrier operations of the war it had been noticed that there were many accidents as aircraft neared the 'Round-down' (the aft edge of the flight deck) on their approach to 'Land-on'. To investigate this phenomenon the Admiralty authorised a research program to establish airflow patterns over the 'Round-down' on large aircraft carriers using a suitable glider towed behind a carrier using a small winch to allow the glider to climb, descend and move forwards and backwards in relation to the 'Round-down'. John Sproule, former designer at Slingsby, was ordered to find a suitable aircraft and carry out the test flying. In 1945 Sproule visited the Slingsby works and took the prototype T.20 away for use in the carrier trials.

=== Carrier trials on HMS Pretoria Castle ===
The T.20 was fitted with special instrumentation and large Zap flaps, fixed at 30°, at Wombleton aerodrome where initial trials were carried out at low altitude towed behind a car. The glider, scientists, John Sproule and winch were loaded onto HMS Pretoria Castle at the Clyde docks and on 29 May 1945 the T.20 took off, tethered to a winch on the flight deck. The glider was manoeuvred around the aft end of the carrier, as she steamed along at 35 knots, until there was a sudden shift in the wind which left Sproule struggling to maintain height calling for the winch to haul him in so he could gain height. The winch engine had stalled and was reluctant to start, but just as Sproule was preparing to abandon the T.20 in the wake of the carrier, the winch burst into life and the T.20 climbed away allowing the shaken Sproule to land the T.20 back on the deck. Results gathered by the instruments were of poor quality so the trials on Pretoria Castle were abandoned.

=== Carrier trials on HMS Illustrious ===
After the scientists had modified their instruments, a new set of trials were authorised to take place on HMS Illustrious. Sproule and an experienced glider pilot as deputy, scientists, glider and equipment were embarked on Illustrious in the English Channel. Initial flights with Sproule at the controls went well, but his deputy's first outing ended in disaster as the pilot failed to pull back on the stick to climb away, staying close to the deck weaving from side to side till eventually the tow cable snagged a telecoms antenna and unceremoniously dumped the T.20 into the sea alongside the carrier. The deputy pilot was rescued but the unfortunate T.20 was rammed by an accompanying destroyer to ensure the wreckage sank.

== Specifications (Slingsby T.20) ==
Data from British Gliders and Sailplanes 1922-1970, Slingsby Sailplanes

General characteristics

- Crew: 2
- Length: 24 ft 3 in (7.39 m)
- Wingspan: 54 ft 6 in (16.61 m)
- Wing area: 290.0 sq ft (26.94 m^{2})
- Aspect ratio: 10
- Airfoil: NACA 4412
- Empty weight: 509 lb (231 kg)
- Gross weight: 1,000 lb (453.6 kg)

Performance

- Rate of sink: 173 ft/min (0.88 m/s)
- Lift-to-drag: 18
- Wing loading: 3.6 lb/sq ft (17.6 kg/m^{2})

== See also ==
Aircraft of comparable role, configuration, and era

- Slingsby T.2 Falcon
- Slingsby T.31 Tandem Tutor

Related lists

- List of gliders
