= Slingsby T.21 =

British two-seat glider, 1944

Slingsby Type 21
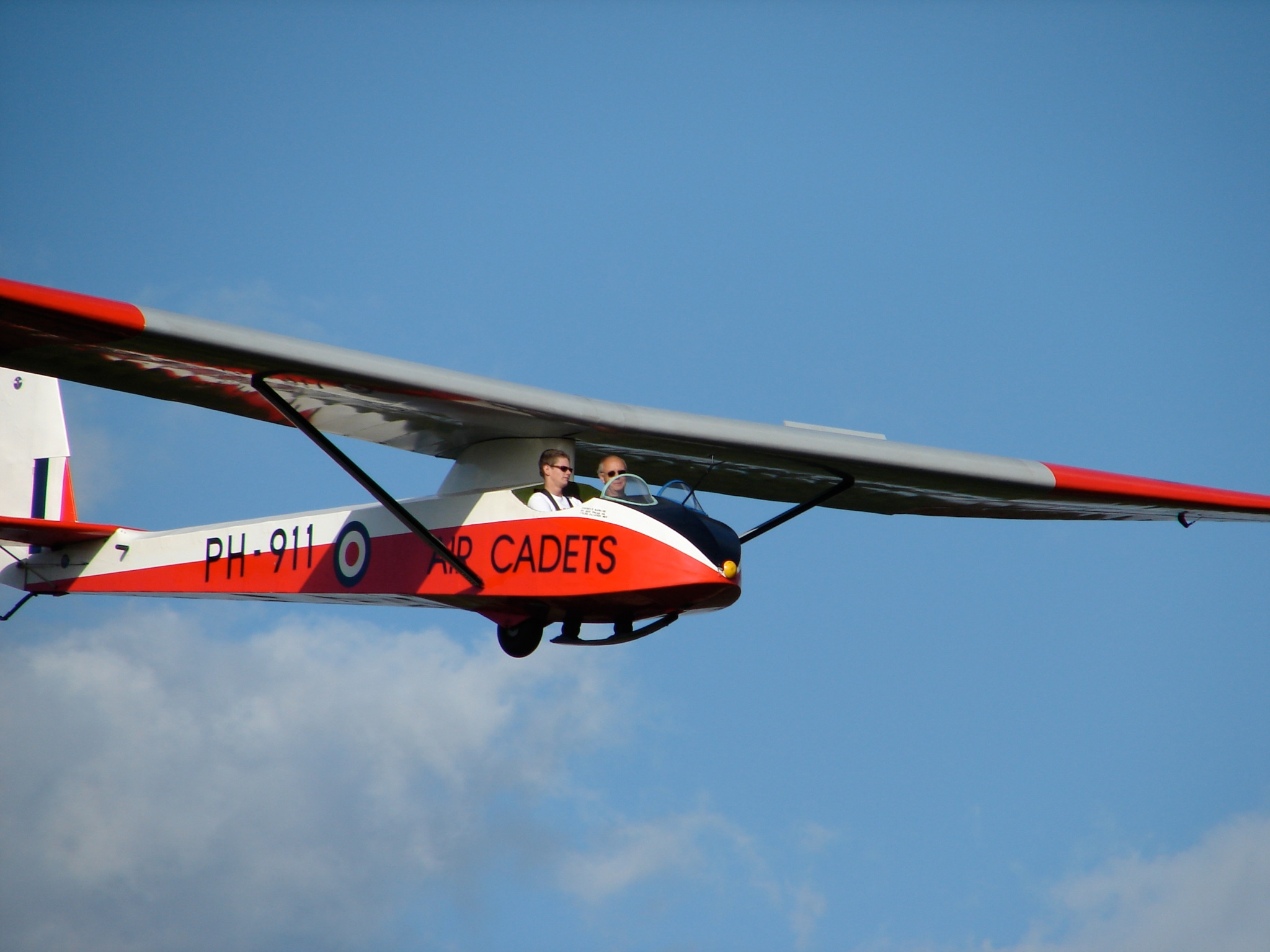
- Slingsby T.21B

General information
- Type: Training glider
- National origin: United Kingdom
- Manufacturer: Slingsby Sailplanes Ltd
- Designer: Fred Slingsby
- Primary user: Royal Air Force (as Sedbergh TX.1)
- Number built: ca. 226

History
- First flight: 1944

The Slingsby T.21 is an open-cockpit, side-by-side two-seat glider, built by Slingsby Sailplanes Ltd and first flown in 1944. It was widely used by the Royal Air Force, Sri Lanka Air Force and by civilian gliding clubs.

== Design and development ==
The Type 21 prototype, the T.21P, first flew in 1944. It was of wooden construction covered with fabric, and was in most respects a scaled-up development of the single-seat German Grunau Baby, which Slingsby had built under licence before the war. The strut-braced wings had a span of 50 feet (15 m), and the upper decking section of the nose was removable, in order to expose the crew to the airflow in the same way as a primary glider. It was designed for use by the Air Training Corps, but was rejected by them and put into storage.

After the end of the war it was bought by the London Gliding Club, who found it very useful. Improvements were suggested, and the result was the T.21A, first flown in 1947, which had its wingspan increased to 54 feet (16 m), and dispensed with the removable nose section. Only one was built, but a slightly modified version, initially known as the T.28, was ordered by the Royal Air Force for Air Cadet training. This was the T.21B, which first flew in December 1947 and went into quantity production both for the RAF (named the Sedbergh TX.1 after the public school of that name) and for civilian clubs. Large numbers were exported to India, as well as to Egypt, Jordan, Kenya, Malaya, the Netherlands, Pakistan, Portugal, South Africa and Sweden.

Up to this time most training had been solo, on single-seat primary gliders, but the introduction of the T.21, together with its cousin, the tandem two-seat T.31, meant that virtually all initial training was being carried out in two-seaters by the early 1950s. The T.21 was popularly named "The Barge", after its boat-like hull and sedate flying qualities, while the T.31 was often referred to as "The Brick", again after its flying qualities.

Another one-off version was the T.21C, also known as the T.46, which flew in October 1957. The wings were lowered so they were placed either side of the upper fuselage, rather than on a pylon above the fuselage. This had the effect of increasing the span to 56 feet 6 inches (17.22 m). It also had an enclosed cockpit and redesigned tail surfaces.

Approximately 226 T.21Bs were built, with production ending in 1966. This total included 19 built for the RAF by Martin Hearn Ltd. at Hooton Park in 1950, and about five built by clubs and individuals from kits or spares.

== Operational history ==
- The RAF received 95 Sedberghs, and the type remained in service until the mid-1980s, when all their wooden gliders were replaced by Grob Vikings. By this time most of the civilian clubs no longer flew T.21s, but the RAF fleet was auctioned off, and the type gained a new popularity with groups seeking recreational flying, in Germany and the Netherlands as well as the UK.
- The Royal Ceylon Air force (present Sri Lanka Air Force), received 2 gliders in 1957, Sedbergh and a Slingsby Kirby Cadet. Both were used as basic training aircraft. Both were retired in 1959.

== Variants ==
T.21P
The initial prototype, built with an open cockpit, offered to the ATC in lieu of the T.20, with a 50ft span wing; first flown in 1944.
T.21A
Civil version introducing the 54ft span wing.

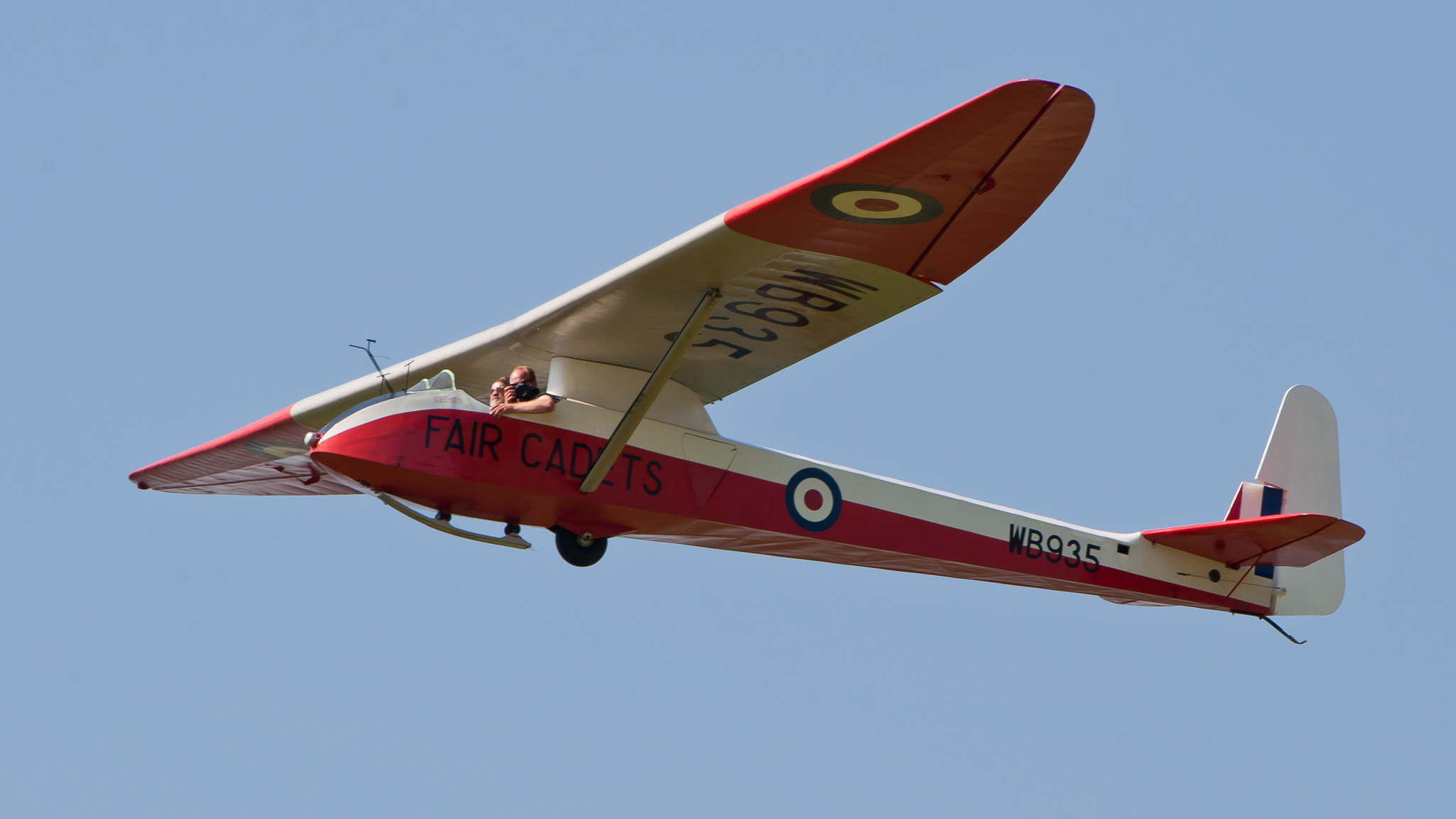
Slingsby T.21B in the downwind leg approaching Hahnweide airfield, Germany (2013)

T.21B
The production version for the ATC known as the Slingsby Sedbergh TX Mk.1
Slingsby Sedbergh TX Mk.1
RAF designation for the T.21B in ATC and RAF service
T.21C
A much improved T.21 with a new fuselage, enclosed cockpit and shoulder-level wings, which was re-designated T.46. Only one T.21C was built and has seen service up to the late 1990s.
T.46
The T.21C re-designated.

== Operators ==
UK Civilian Gliding Clubs

- Derbyshire and Lancashire Gliding Club
- Yorkshire Gliding Club
- Cambridge Gliding Centre
- Oxford Gliding Club

== Former operators ==
Sri Lanka

- Royal Ceylon Air Force
- Ratmalana Civil Flying Training School
The gliders were in service from 1957 to 1959.

United Kingdom

- Air Training Corps (Royal Air Force)

== Aircraft on display ==
- US Southwest Soaring Museum

== Specifications (T.21B) ==
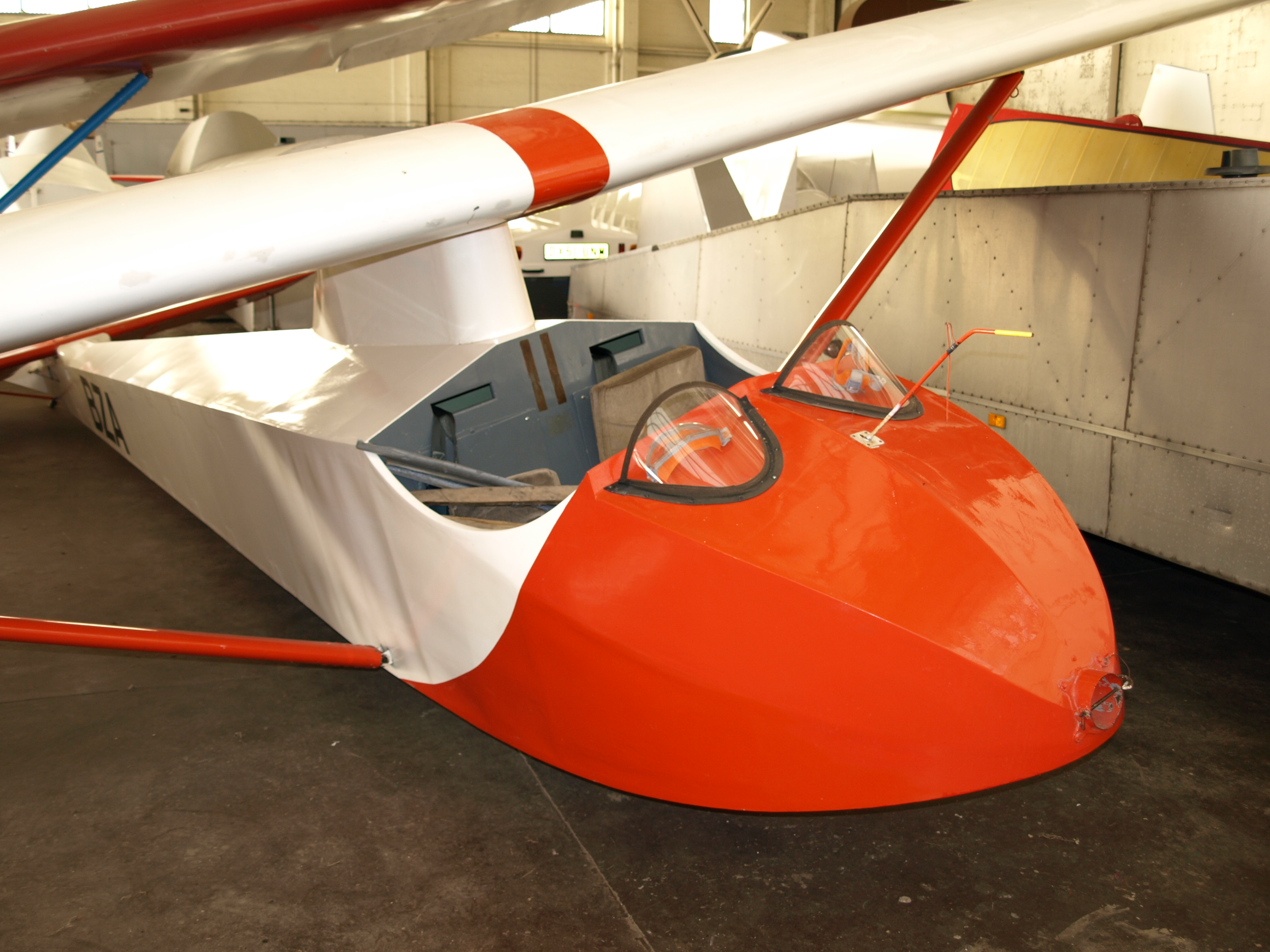
Slingsby T.21 at Windrushers Gliding Club

Data from British Gliders and Sailplanes 1922-1970 and The World's Sailplanes:Die Segelflugzeuge der Welt:Les Planeurs du Monde

General characteristics

- Crew: 2
- Length: 26 ft 9 in (8.16 m)
- Wingspan: 54 ft 2 in (16.5 m)
- Wing area: 260 sq ft (24.2 m^{2})
- Aspect ratio: 11.2
- Airfoil: Göttingen 535 (root), symmetrical (tip)
- Empty weight: 589 lb (267 kg)
- Max takeoff weight: 1,047 lb (475 kg)

Performance

- Stall speed: 32 mph (52 km/h, 28 kn)
- Never exceed speed: 110 mph (170 km/h, 92 kn)
- Aerotow speed: 75 mph (121 km/h; 65 kn)
- Winch launch speed: 63 mph (101 km/h; 55 kn)
- Maximum glide ratio: 21:1 at 43 mph (69 km/h; 37 kn)
- Rate of sink: 167 ft/min (0.85 m/s) at 39 mph (63 km/h; 34 kn)
- Wing loading: 4.0 lb/sq ft (19.6 kg/m^{2})

== See also ==
Related lists

- List of gliders
