= Slingsby Vega =

British single-seat glider, 1977

T65 Vega and Sport Vega
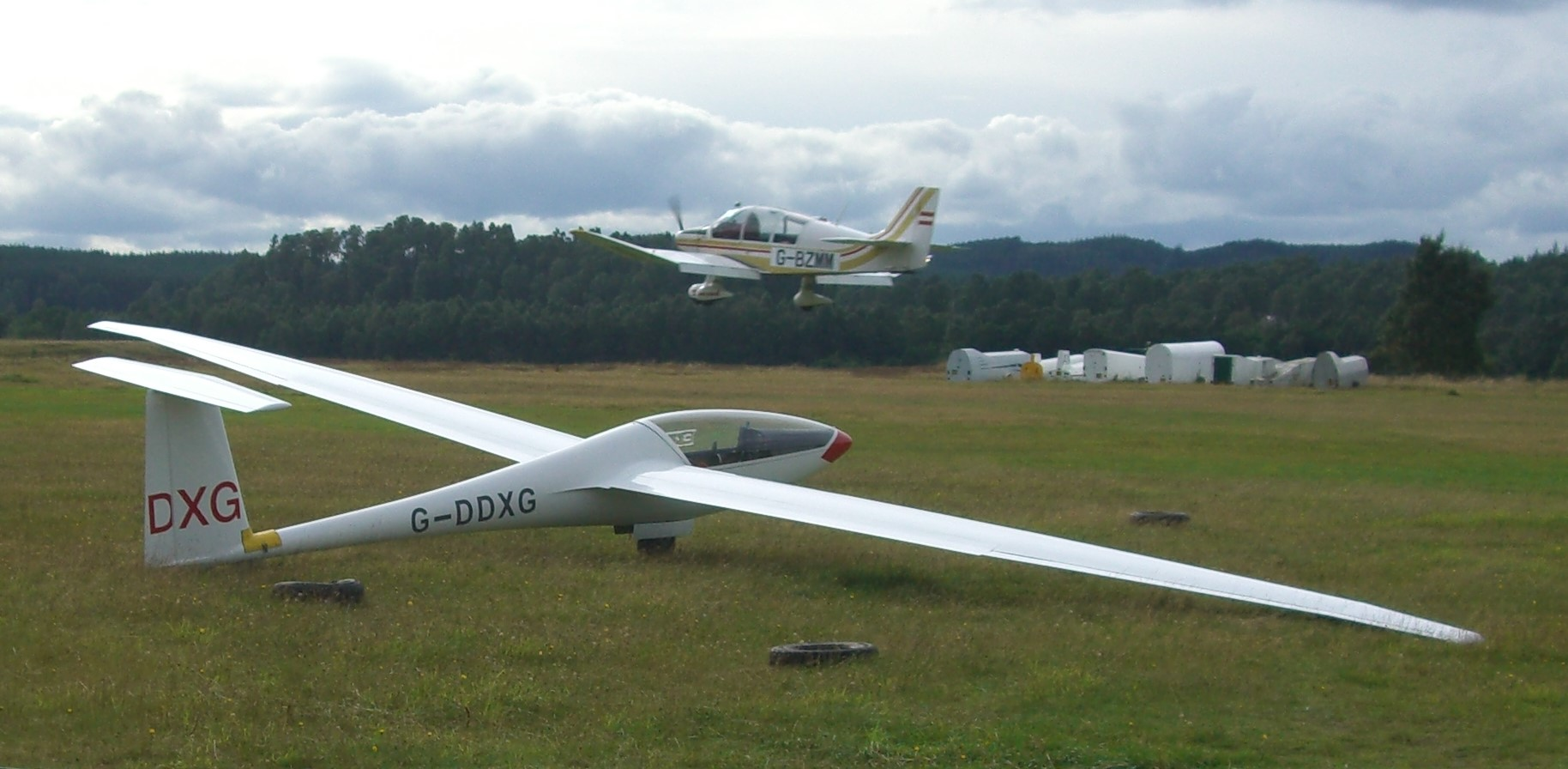

General information
- Type: 15 Metre class sailplane
- National origin: United Kingdom
- Manufacturer: Slingsby Aviation

History
- First flight: 3 June 1977

The Vickers-Slingsby T-65 Vega is a 15-metre class glider which first flew on 3 June 1977. Of fibreglass construction, it features linked camber-changing flaps and airbrakes, and a retractable main and tailwheel.

A simplified version called the T-65C Sport Vega has a non-retractable mainwheel and hinged trailing edge airbrakes instead of flaps. This version of the Vega first flew on 18 December 1979 and has no provision for water ballast.

== Variants ==
Data from:

T65A
Initial production version first flown in 1977.
T65B
One production glider was designated T65B.
T65C Sport Vega
Fixed-wheel with no flaps or water ballast, first flown in 1980.
T65D Vega
Increased water ballast to 350 lb (160 kg) and increased all up weight to 1,120 lb (510 kg).
Vega 17L
Gliders fitted with optional wingtips to increase span to 17 metres.

== Specifications (T65D) ==
Data from Slingsby Sailplanes.

General characteristics

- Crew: One
- Length: 22 ft 0 in (6.72 m)
- Wingspan: 49 ft 3 in (15.00 m)
- Wing area: 109 sq ft (10.1 m^{2})
- Aspect ratio: 22.4
- Empty weight: 519 lb (236 kg)
- Gross weight: 1,120 lb (510 kg)

Performance

- Maximum speed: 160 mph (250 km/h, 140 kn)
- Maximum glide ratio: 42
- Rate of sink: 132 ft/min (0.67 m/s)
