= Slingsby Skylark 2 =

British single-seat glider, 1953

Slingsby T.41 Skylark 2
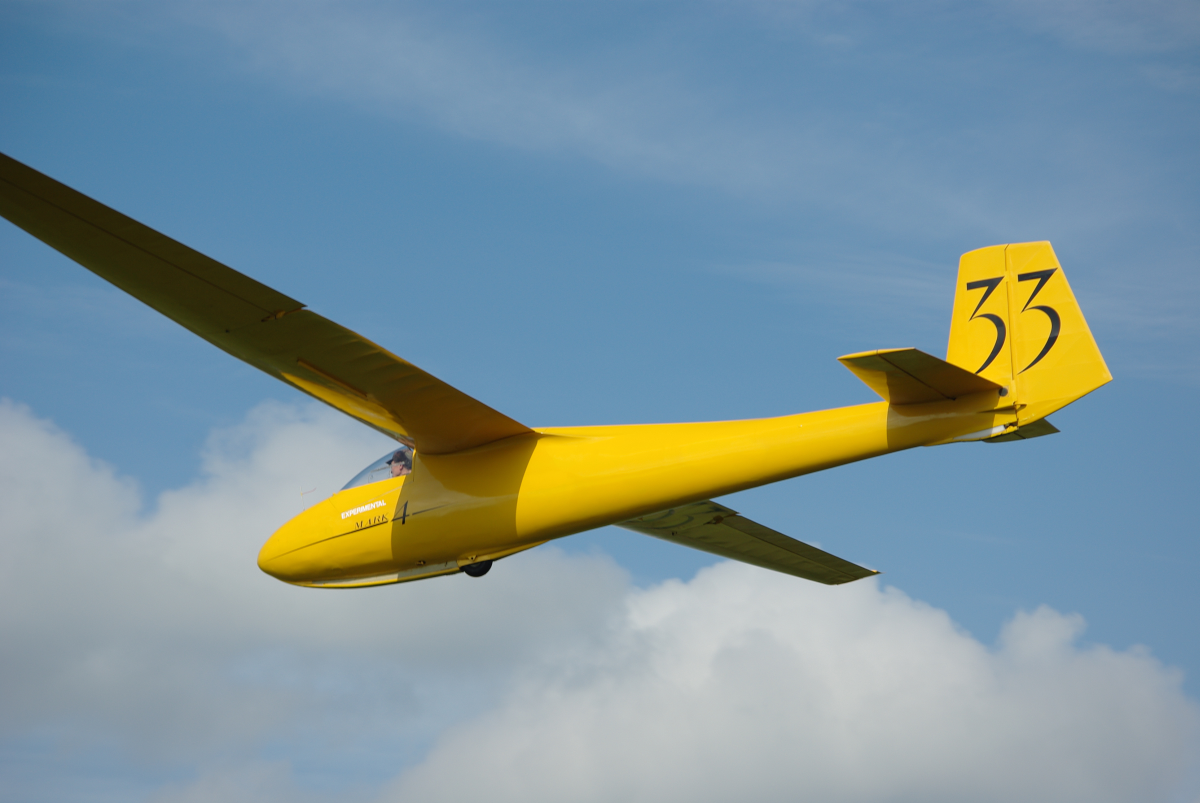
- Skylark 2C (BGA778)

General information
- Type: Sailplane
- National origin: United Kingdom
- Manufacturer: Slingsby Sailplanes
- Designer: John Reussner
- Number built: 63

History
- First flight: 1953
- Developed from: Slingsby Skylark 1
- Variants: Skylark 3, Skylark 4

The Slingsby T.41 Skylark 2 was a sailplane produced from 1953 by Slingsby Sailplanes at Kirkbymoorside, Yorkshire.

== Design and development ==
Following the technical success of the T.37 Skylark, the concept was expanded with the introduction of the T.41 Skylark 2. The use of laminar-flow sections was continued but the section at the tips was changed to NACA4415 to reduce the tendency to tip-stall. The Skylark 2 was very similar in shape to its predecessor but had a smooth-skinned rounded fuselage and a wing of greater span and area. Composite materials were introduced in the Skylark 2, with the nose cone, wingtips and various small fairings made from polyester resin glassfibre. The thickness of the aerofoils was increased to ensure that drag was reduced over a wider speed range allowing the Skylark 2 to climb faster in thermals at low speed and race between thermals at high speed.

== History ==
The prototype was flown in November 1953 and tested by the British Gliding Association's Test Group No.1 based at Lasham Airfield. Results of the tests showed that the Skylark 2 was a safe aircraft with a reasonable performance. Orders were received from individuals, clubs and syndicates, but the Skylark 2 was soon outclassed in international competitions.

== Specifications (Skylark 2) ==
Data from British Gliders and Sailplanes 1922-1970 and The World's Sailplanes:Die Segelflugzeuge der Welt:Les Planeurs du Monde

General characteristics

- Crew: 1
- Length: 24 ft 0 in (7.31 m)
- Wingspan: 48 ft 0 in (14.63 m)
- Wing area: 144 sq ft (13.4 m^{2})
- Aspect ratio: 16
- Airfoil: centre section NACA 63_{3}-620, tip NACA 4415
- Empty weight: 420 lb (190.5 kg)
- Max takeoff weight: 679 lb (308 kg)

Performance

- Stall speed: 32 kn (37 mph, 59 km/h)
- Never exceed speed: 116 kn (134 mph, 215 km/h)
- Aerotow speed: 71 kn (131 km/h; 82 mph)
- Winch launch speed: 60 kn (110 km/h; 69 mph)
- g limits: +7.5 -3.8 at 66 kn (122 km/h; 76 mph)
- Lift-to-drag: 30 at 42 kn (78 km/h; 48 mph)
- Wing loading: 4.7 lb/sq ft (23 kg/m^{2})

== See also ==
Related lists

- List of gliders
