= Slingsby Dart =

British single-seat glider, 1963

Dart
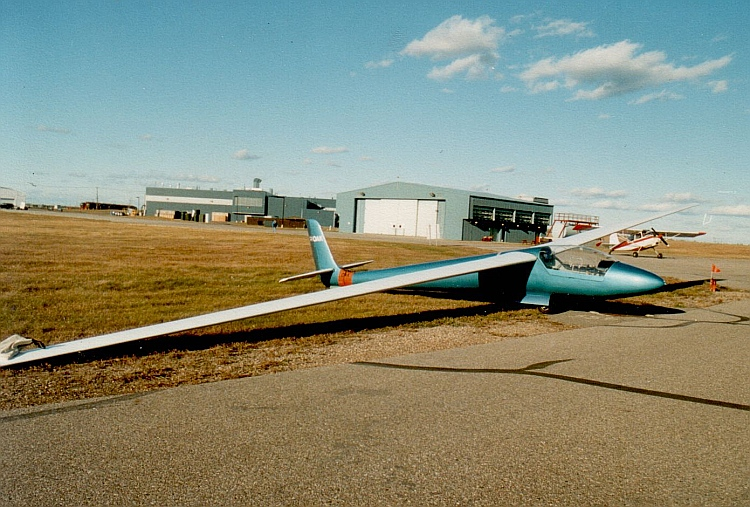
- Dart 17R

General information
- Type: Single seat competition sailplane
- National origin: United Kingdom
- Manufacturer: Slingsby Sailpalnes Ltd
- Number built: 82

History
- First flight: 26 November 1963

The Slingsby Type 51 Dart is a single seat competition glider designed in the early 1960s, initially as a 15 m span Standard Class aircraft but evolved into an Open Class, 17 m sailplane. It was the last Slingsby sailplane to be mostly constructed of wood.

== Development ==
The Slingsby Dart was the last of a long line of gliders and sailplanes built by Slingsby Sailplanes Ltd almost entirely from wood. From the Slingsby Skylark 2 of 1953 onwards, the company had used Gaboon ply, thicker but less dense than the traditional birch for surfacing wings and fuselage, as it gave a smoother surface capable of maintaining the more demanding profiles of the newer aerofoils. The Capstan flew ten years later with double curvature parts of the fuselage skin produced from glass-reinforced plastic (G.R.P). Combined, these were the construction methods initially used for the Dart.

The Dart was originally a 15 m sailplane, aimed immediately at the 1964 UK Gliding Championships and beyond at the 1965 World Championships. Its wings were shoulder mounted, with 2^{o} dihedral and about 0.75^{o} forward sweep at quarter chord. They were built around spruce spars with a plywood covered torsion box ahead to the leading edge, fabric covered behind and with plywood covered ailerons. The mid-chord airbrakes were arranged as pairs above and below the wings.

The fuselage seemed notably long and slender at the time, and the tail unit small. It was a semi-monocoque spruce structure, plywood covered apart from the G.R.P in the cockpit area, with the single piece canopy hinged on the starboard side. The original tail unit was again a spruce structure with G.R.P. leading edges, its all moving tailplane mounted low on the fin, though later aircraft used a metal framed tailplane. The rudder and the rear part of the tailplane were fabric covered, the latter carrying trim tabs. On early aircraft the undercarriage was a non-retractable single wheel placed under the leading edge of the wing, plus a short skid under the nose and a tail bumper.

The Dart first flew on 26 November 1963. Four were entered into the National Gliding Competition in May 1964, but failed to impress in the light conditions of the first few days. It became increasingly clear that the speed of the Dart could not compensate in typical English conditions for the high minimum sink rate resulting from its high wing loading of 5.6 lb/sq ft (27.3 kg/m^{2}). Since the 1965 World Championships were also scheduled for the UK, Slingsby decided to increase the wing area by stretching the span to 17 m, making the Dart an entrant for the Open Class. Initially this version also had a wooden wing spar, but some distortion noticed when the airbrakes were extended led to a redesigned spar of mixed metal and wood construction. The new wing was also fitted with a trailing edge root extension and a 1 ft (0.305 m) increase in aileron length and this version of the Dart became known as the Dart 17. The first Dart 17 used an undercarriage with a less extended wheel, fitted in a fairing but almost all later ones were fitted with a retracting undercarriage. The later Dart 15s used a similar metal and wood spar and had the root fillet, producing a net weight saving of 45 lb (21 kg) and a corresponding improvement in sink rate. Most Dart 15s retained the fixed wheel undercarriage to allow them to compete as Standard Class. Darts with retractable gear are known as the 17R.

== Operational history ==
The 1965 World Championships saw only modest success for the Darts: a Dart 15 finished 5th in the Standard Class event and the Dart 17 came 7th in the Open Class. 82 complete Darts of both spans are known to have been built. Overall, rather more of the large-span Darts were made. One had removable wing tips, so it could fly in either class. Two special Dart 15s, designated Dart 15W were produced for the Standard Class at the 1968 World Championships with wings using a new aerofoil section and a revised canopy. After the competition, in which they were not highly placed, their wings were extended to 17 m and they were redesignated Dart 17W; later fitted with the retractable undercarriage, they became 17WRs. Several Darts were built from kits in New Zealand and flew there. Others were exported to Burma, Canada, Rhodesia, Switzerland and the USA.

== Surviving aircraft ==
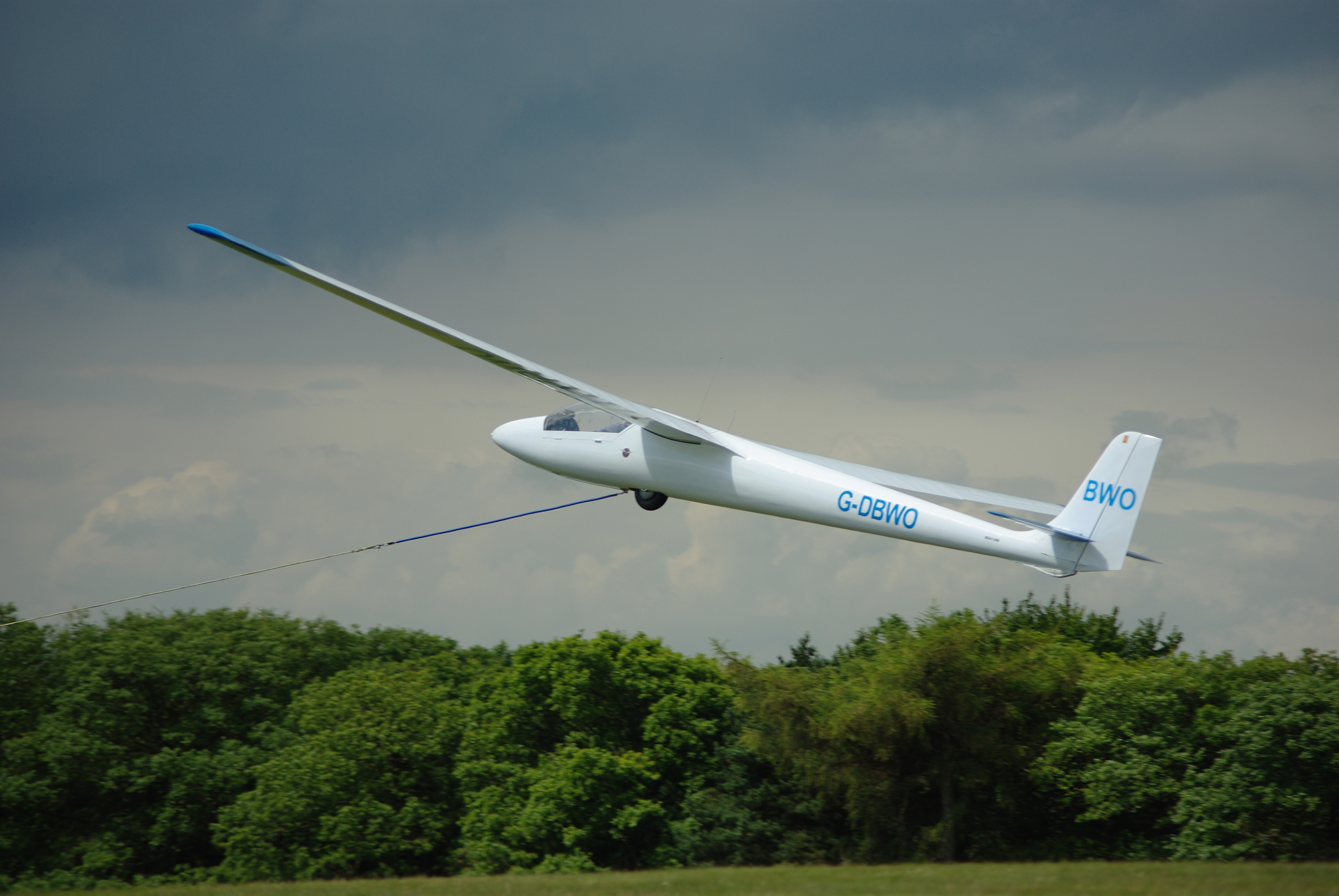
Slingsby Dart G-DBWO launch at Vintage Glider Rally, Camphill, Derbyshire June 2011

The first Dart, now G-DBSA is now in the historic gliding collection at Lasham. The two 17WRs, registered G-DCAZ and G-DCBA have restricted certificates of airworthiness valid into 2015. Many others are still flying, mostly in the UK but with a few in the rest of Europe and in the USA.

== Aircraft on display ==
=== Burma ===
On display

- UB0001 at the Defence Services Museum, Naypyitaw.

== Variants ==
From Ellison 1971, pp. 219–220

Dart
the first 15 aircraft initially carried no further description; 15 m span wings, wooden sparred
Dart 15
later 15 m span wings, all or most metal sparred and with root fillets
Dart 15R
Dart 15 with retractable undercarriage
Dart 15W
new wing, designed for 1968 World Championships, 2 only
Dart 17
17 m span wing, metal sparred and with root fillets first flew November 1964
Dart 17R
Dart 17 with retractable undercarriage
Dart 17W
the 15Ws converted to 17 m span
Dart 17WR
the 17Ws with retractable undercarriage
Chard Osprey
Experimental high-performance design, a Dart 15 fuselage and tail unit fitted with a wing designed by K. Chard.

== Specifications (Dart 17) ==
Data from Ellison 1971, pp. 219–220

General characteristics

- Crew: 1
- Length: 24 ft 7 in (7.5 m)
- Wingspan: 55 ft 9 in (17.0 m)
- Wing area: 149.3 sq ft (13.87 m^{2})
- Aspect ratio: 20.4
- Airfoil: NACA 64_{3}618 at root, NACA 64_{3}615 at tip
- Empty weight: 498 lb (226 kg)
- Gross weight: 750 lb (340 kg)

Performance

- Maximum glide ratio: 36:1 at 52 mph (83 km/h)
- Rate of sink: 120 ft/min (0.6 m/s) at 46 mph (74 km/h)
- Wing loading: 4.7 lb/sq ft (22.8 kg/m^{2})

== See also ==
Related lists

- List of gliders
