= SAH 2200 hovercraft =

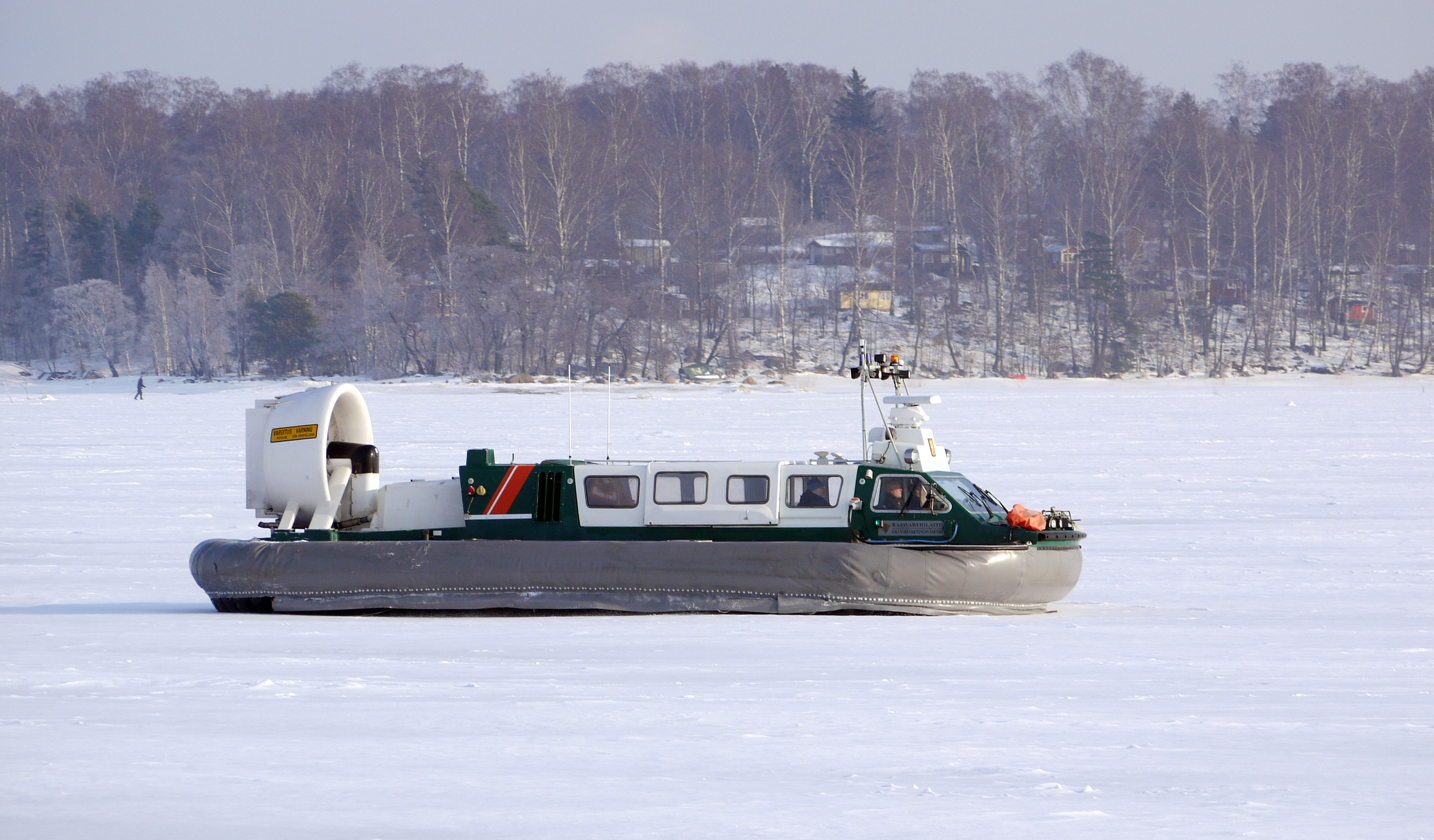
- A Finnish Border Guard SAH 2200 in action

Class overview
- Name: SAH 2200 hovercraft
- Builders: Slingsby Amphibious Hovercraft Company

General characteristics
- Type: hovercraft
- Tonnage: 4,600kg
- Length: 10.6 m (34 ft 9 in)
- Beam: 4.2 m (13 ft 9 in)
- Height: 2.6 m (8 ft 6 in) off cushion
- Propulsion: 1 Cummins 6CTA-8-3M-1 diesel engine 190 hp (140 kW) for lift and propulsion driving one variable-pitch propeller
- Speed: 40 kn (74 km/h)
- Range: 500km
- Capacity: 23 passengers
- Troops: 12 troops

The Slingsby SAH 2200 hovercraft is a small military hovercraft designed and originally produced by the Slingsby Amphibious Hovercraft Company at their facility in Kirkbymoorside, England.

Work on the vehicle commenced during the early 1980s, leading to full-scale testing during 1986. Quantity production of the SAH 2200 was achieved during the early 1990s, with several examples being sold to international military operators. An early prominent customer was the Finnish Border Guard. During September 2008, the rights to produce and market the SAH 2200 was sold by Slingsby to Engineering and Professional Services Inc. This company since produced its own model of the SAH 2200 hovercraft, designated the EPS SAH 2200, at their facilities in Titusville, Florida.

== Development ==
During the early 1980s, the British firm Slingsby Amphibious Hovercraft Company decided to embark on the design and production of its own hovercraft, designated SAH 2200. As the specification for the vehicle was defined, it was designed to produce a relatively compact hovercraft that would make extensive use of composite materials. By 1986, an initial prototype had been completed and a second vehicle was nearing completion as certification trials of the type were underway. During these trials, the prototype demonstrated its ability to successfully operate in 1.5m short seas and Force 8 wind gusting Force 9, even while carrying a payload of 2,200kg.

In the late 1980s, Slingsby commenced quantity production of the SAH 2200 at their Kirkbymoorside facility. From the onset of the project, the vehicle was optimised towards military operations and was marketed primarily to the global export market. During March 1989, it was announced that the American firm had secured a licensing agreement with Slingsby to market and sell the SAH 2200; the arrangement included technology transfer and training aspects.

During September 2008, it was announced that the American company Engineering and Professional Services Inc. (EPS) had acquired Slingsby Advanced Composites Limited, which included all activities pertaining to the SAH 2200 hovercraft. The company has endeavoured to become a prominent manufacturer of hovercraft.

Since the change in ownership, it has been renamed the EPS SAH 2200. The company has established its own production line for the type at Titusville, Florida, producing it alongside its larger EPS M-10 hovercraft series. EPS has also developed an enhanced model of the vehicle, which involved the use of new composites to increase flexibility and impact resistance, as well as to lower fuel consumption and minimise fatigue. As of 2016, the company has continued to market the SAH 2200 to military customers around the world.

== Configuration ==
The SAH 2200 is a compact military hovercraft. It has the capacity to transport a maximum of 12 fully-equipped troops, 23 passengers, or alternatively a payload of up to 2.2 tons. The vehicle is typically armed with a single 12.7mm machine gun. Both propulsion and auxiliary power is supplied by a single Cummins 6CTA-8-3M-1 diesel engine, rated at 190bhp at 2,500rpm. Power from the engine is delivered via a toothed belt to the vehicle's single 1.5m diameter propeller, which is positioned within a duct above the after part of the deck. Dependent upon customer preference, the deck area can be left completely open, covered by a half-canopy, or placed entirely within a cabin.

Considerable attention was paid to the SAH 2200's controllability, its designers aimed for it to have a high degree of manoeuvrability for operating in confined spaces and as well as to handle well over rough ground or uncalm seas. The variable-pitch propeller enabled a reverse thrust capability, while trimming was primarily performed by transferring fuel between its tanks. Other control surfaces include four elevators and three rudders, the latter providing directional control along with a transverse skirt shift system.

As originally designed, the SAH 2200 incorporated a very high degree of composite materials into its design; its body generally consists of a 75mm thick epoxy-resin coated GRP sandwich, the underside of which features sacrificial Kevlar protection. The principle materials used include glass and carbon fibers. All of the onboard systems and structural components alike have been designed to withstand inhospitable climates, such as the high prevailing ambient temperatures of the Middle East.

== Operational history ==
One early customer was the Maryland State Police Department, who was operating one example in Chesapeake Bay as early as 1989.

The Finland Frontier Guard acquired its first SAH 2200 in March 1993. A further three were ordered in February 1998 and delivered during late 1999.

A single SAH 2200 was used in the filming of the opening action sequence to the James Bond movie Die Another Day; it has since been preserved at the Hovercraft Museum.

== Operators ==
- Finnish Navy

== Specifications ==
- Designer / Manufacturer: Slingsby Amphibious Hovercraft Company
- Crew 2
- Dimensions
  - Length 10.6 metres
  - Width 4.2 metres
  - full load displacement 5.5 tons
- Propulsion
  - Motor: diesel engine
  - Power: 1 Cummins 6CTA-8-3M-1 diesel engine 300 horsepower for lift and propulsion
  - Propellers: 1 three-bladed variable-pitch propeller
- Performance
  - Speed: 40 knots
  - Range: 400 miles at 30 knots
  - Military Lift: 12 troops or 2.2 tons of cargo
- Weapons
  - 1 X 12.7mm machine gun
- Radar
  - Navigation: Raytheon R41; I-band
