= Slingsby CAMCO V-Liner =

V-Liner

General information
- Type: Advertising display aircraft
- National origin: United Kingdom
- Manufacturer: Slingsby Aircraft
- Status: Prototype destroyed before completion
- Number built: 0

The Slingsby CAMCO V-Liner was a proposed advertising aircraft of unusual design of the 1960s. It was intended to display advertising using electric lights to be viewed at a long distance, and as such consisted of a long triangular frame carried between two sets of wings and fuselages. The prototype V-Liner was destroyed in a factory fire before completion and the type was abandoned.

== Design and development ==
In the late 1960s, the American company Central Aircraft Manufacturing Company Inc. (CAMCO) was interested in means of aerial advertising. A requirement was identified for an 18-letter message to be displayed by means of electric lights, which would be easily readable at a range of 2–3 miles (3–5 km). The use of blimps (non-rigid airships) was not considered economical, while a fixed wing aircraft carrying such a message would be much longer than any ever built.

CAMCO decided that a long rigid triangular framework of aluminium tubing would be used to carry the display lighting, and that it would be carried between separate sets of wings and fuselages at the front and rear of the framework. The aircraft's crew would consist of two; one in each of the fuselages, with the aircraft normally flown from the forward fuselage and the display electronics controlled from the rear. Each fuselage would have a set of monoplane wings, which were all-moving so that they could be used as control surfaces, while the aircraft was to be powered by two engines carried on pylons above the front fuselage and its wings. Production aircraft were planned to be amphibious, although the prototype would not be.

CAMCO chose Slingsby Aircraft of Kirbymoorside, England to build the new aircraft, called the V-Liner, in 1968. A prototype was expected to fly in late 1969, while it was hoped to build 42 in four years, with several hundred built over a longer period. V-Liners would be available only for lease from CAMCO, not for sale. Variants would be the "CV2 Video Liner", "CV3 Vector" and "CV4 Victory Liner".

Work began on construction of the first prototype, but the Slingsby factory was wrecked by a fire on 18 November 1968, and the partly built prototype was badly damaged. The fire forced Slingsby into receivership, and although the company was rescued by Vickers Limited and resumed glider production, work on the V-Liner was abandoned.

== Specifications ==
Data from Jane's All The World's Aircraft 1969–70

General characteristics

- Crew: two
- Length: 378 ft 0 in (115.21 m)
- Wingspan: 69 ft 6 in (21.18 m)
- Aspect ratio: 6.95:1
- Airfoil: NACA 0018
- Max takeoff weight: 12,000 lb (5,443 kg)
- Powerplant: 2 × Pratt & Whitney Canada PT6A-20 turboprops, 579 hp (432 kW) each

Performance

- Maximum speed: 69 mph (111 km/h, 60 kn) (ferrying speed)
- Cruise speed: 53 mph (85 km/h, 46 kn) (operating speed)
- Stall speed: 40 mph (64 km/h, 35 kn)
