= Yorkshire Gliding Club =

Yorkshire Gliding Club Thirsk Sutton Bank
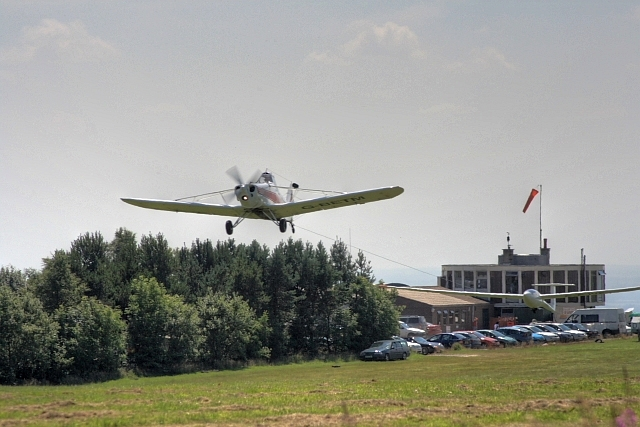
- Yorkshire Gliding Club glider under tow. The circular clubhouse is in the background
- IATA: none; ICAO: none

Summary
- Airport type: Private
- Owner/Operator: Yorkshire Gliding Club
- Location: Sutton Bank, Cold Kirby, North Yorkshire
- Opened: 1934
- Time zone: GMT (BST)
- Elevation AMSL: 920 ft (280 m)
- Coordinates: 54.2307°N 1.2093°W
- Website: Official website

Map
- Location within North Yorkshire

Runways
Direction	Length		Surface
Direction	ft	m	Surface
02-20		1,000	grass
06-24		500	grass

The Yorkshire Gliding Club (YGC) operate from an airfield (Note: Sutton Bank was mentioned in the House of Lords in the year 2000 as being an aerodrome as this would restrict open access to the site on the grounds that the flying activity on the site presented a health and safety risk.) on Sutton Bank in the North York Moors National Park, England. The airfield site is 7 miles (11 km) east of Thirsk along the A170 road and just south of the National Park visitors centre at Sutton Bank. The club formed in 1934 from an amalgamation of gliding concerns from the West Riding of Yorkshire and has been in existence for over 80 years and has had many famous fliers such as Nicholas Goodhart, Amy Johnson and Fred Slingsby.

The club's location, on top of Roulston Scar and Sutton Bank over the White Horse of Kilburn, and the sheer drop away of the cliff, has made it a notable aircraft launching point. It is the most popular gliding club in the north of England.

== History ==
Sutton Bank had been in use as a glider launching site for 25 years before the YGC was formed and had also been used by Slingsby Sailplanes to test their aircraft. (Note: The Slingsby factory is still in Kirkbymoorside, some 12 miles (20 km) east of the Sutton Bank site) The first official recorded use of the site was in 1911 when Erik Addyman launched his self-built glider off the edge of Sutton Bank. The Yorkshire Gliding Club was formed in April 1934 as an amalgamation of the Bradford Gliding Club with the Ilkley and District Gliding Club by Phil Wills, Fred Slingsby and Norman Sharpe. (Note: The Bradford club had absorbed the Leeds Gliding Club and had its premises at Apperley Bridge. They often trialled their gliders on Baildon Moor, but this proved to be too small for them when they amalgamated with the Ilkley Club, and so a new site was needed.) The club moved to Sutton Bank in the second half of 1934 when they negotiated a lease on the site from the land owners (it was owned by the Church of England) with the site being perceived as second only to one at Dunstable in the development of British gliding. However, in the early days of gliding the airspace at Sutton Bank was deemed of far greater value as its launch site was 600 feet (180 m) above the ground level at the bottom of the cliff compared to Dunstable's 200 feet (61 m) clearance.

The YGC airfield sits atop an escarpment on the southern edge of Sutton Bank, 920 feet (280 m) above sea level, (Note: The main part of the airfield is at 920 feet (280 m) but the highest part of the Roulston Scar Promontory rises to 938 feet (286 m)) that used to be an Iron Age hill fort, and as such, the site is registered as a scheduled monument (excluding for the YGC buildings). Due to the topography of the site, which has a steep west facing escarpment, air is forced upwards against the cliff face providing natural lift with an aerial tow or winch assisting the gliders in getting airborne. A third form of lift exists in what is known as a Mountain Wave which allows for flying at advanced heights, with the club record standing at 33,000 feet (10,000 m).

In August 1935, despite being only just over one year old, the Yorkshire Gliding Club and their airfield at Sutton Bank were deemed to be the premier location for the August to September National Gliding Competition. The editorial of the August edition of the Sailplane and Gliding Journal stated

...it is safe to say that there is no other site in the country at present nearly as well suited to the efficient running of the Competitions [sic].

The launch site at Sutton Bank was recognised nationally as the best place in the United Kingdom for high-efficiency soaring and gliding. Hangars and ancillary buildings were erected in 1934 for the National Gliding Championships. In 1936, a brick hangar was built which is still extant today.

During the early days of gliding, men would haul ropes and "run like hell" to catapult the glider into the air, which used the natural up-draughts from the edge of the cliffs to keep the gliders aloft. A mechanical system was installed when the YGC bought a Rolls-Royce Silver Ghost and converted the engine to work a winch to get the gliders airborne. This involved removing the wheels, installing 2,625 feet (800 m) of steel cable and engaging the drive function to get the aircraft off the ground. When the glider was safely airborne, the gear on the car would be changed to neutral and the aircraft released. Due to the relative simple design of the gliders that YGC used at that time, the grassed areas were sufficient as they were and needed relatively low maintenance. Rabbits were introduced to keep the grass trim but they also supplied rabbit meat to local butchers, a lucrative sideline for the club.

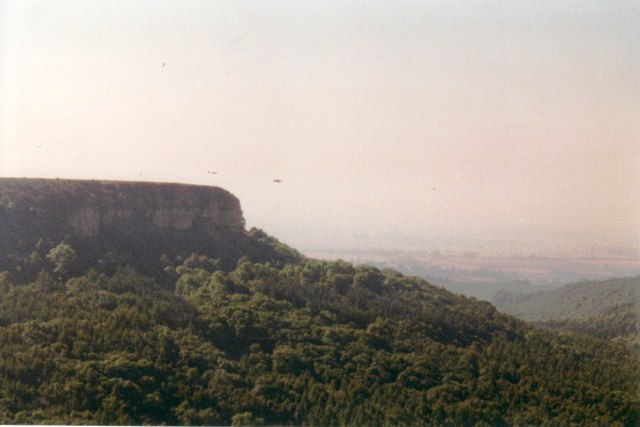
Gliding off Roulston Crag; here the towing plane has cleared the crag and has already dipped below its level. The attached glider is just getting airborne

Glider training for Royal Air Force cadets was undertaken at the site during 1939, with No. 28 Glider School using the site sporadically up until their disbandment in 1950. The airstrip was not used for any flying purposes during the Second World War, but may have been left as a decoy airfield to attract enemy bombers (though certain groups such as English Heritage state there is no evidence of this). Another decoy airfield was sited on the racecourse on the opposite side of the A170, 1.2 miles (2 km) north of the airfield. This was furnished with replica Whitley bombers and became a relief landing ground for RAF Dishforth. At least one Royal Air Force aircraft is recorded to have landed at Sutton Bank when all other airstrips in the Vale of York were fogbound. As the site was familiar to many German glider pilots, defensive ditches were dug out of the airfield by the British Army during the 1940s, as it was perceived as a Nazi invasion site. The Germans were world leaders in the sport of gliding and many had travelled to Britain to train British pilots during the 1930s. One had even spent two years at Sutton Bank in the late 1930s training other glider pilots. As the German use of parachutists and gliders was seen to good effect when they invaded the Low Countries, Sutton Bank was perceived as a risk and so plans were made to fortify the area and cover over the White Horse to prevent identifying the location from the air. The digging damaged the Iron Age fortifications.

In 1959, the circular clubhouse was built; this is still used today as the YGCs cafe and main meeting point; due to its circular nature, it offers panoramic views across the surrounding countryside. A new hangar was built in 2014 to accommodate the increase in members and storage of aircraft.

The grassed strip is also available for powered aircraft such as small propeller driven planes which tow the gliders into the air, and other types such as gyrocopters. The YGC is open seven days a week and deploys aircraft each day weather permitting, but they also have an on-site simulator, which can be used in the event of a non-flying day. The simulator cost £17,000 and was installed in 2008. Since 2011, the YGC and the training element from RAF Linton-on-Ouse have had cross-training days to make the two entities aware of each other in the sky. As both the YGC and the RAF pilots under training use the crowded airspace of the Vale of York, a programme was developed where all pilots going through Basic Flying Training (BFT) with the RAF are given hands-on experience with gliders.

In September 2021, the YGC had 13 aircraft registered on the UK Register of Civil Aircraft and in 2013 had a complement of just under 200 members; it is often described as being the most popular gliding club in the north of England. The site has two grassed runways which are 3,300 feet (1,000 m) and 1,600 feet (500 m) in length, with the footprint of the site covering over 100 acres (40 ha). The longer airstrip was created in 1955 with the cooperation of the Forestry Commission, and was extended further in mid-1960s with a second aircraft hangar being constructed in late 1969.

The Cleveland Way walk traverses the extreme western end of the site where it drops away to the cliffs below. The Yorkshire Gliding Club cafe is open to non-flying personnel and walkers are welcome to sample what is on offer. Gliding courses are also available to non-members.

== Incidents ==
The safety record at YGC (and of the wider UK gliding fraternity) is good. Across all of the gliding clubs in the United Kingdom between 1972 and 1995, they were 76 fatalities in comparison to over 8 million glider launches across the UK. All of these fatalities were glider pilots (or passengers) and no deaths occurred to people on the ground. The British Gliding Association points out that

Gliding is an adventurous air sport and as such is not as safe as travelling on a commercial airliner. If you are looking for a totally risk free sport, gliding may not be right for you. The BGA gives priority to continuing to reduce the fatal accident rate and to not harming any third parties. In the latest 10 year period [2007–2016], the trainee glider pilot serious injury rate was 0.4 per 100,000 flights with zero fatalities. For all glider pilots in the same period, the serious injury rate was 1.9 per 100,000 flights with a fatal injury rate of 0.7 per 100,000 flights.

Due to the location of the YGC airfield over Sutton Bank and the A170 road, coupled with the crowded airspace in the Vale of York, there have been some notable incidents at Sutton Bank or in the vicinity. It is worth noting that the airspace around the airfield is designated as Class-G, which means that the principal method of preventing accidents (moreover mid-air collisions) is a "see and avoid" system. Also, microlights, gyrocopters and gliders have different airworthiness codes and different licensing standards for their pilots in comparison to those of heavier commercial, military and passenger carrying aircraft.

Date	Incident	YGC club member	Ref
16 August 1937	A 25-year old pilot was killed when his glider plunged to the ground immediately after take-off.	Unknown	
15 December 2004	A gyrocopter crashed into woodland near to the airfield site, at the bottom of the cliff. The pilot was pronounced dead at the scene.	Yes	
30 August 2006	A glider crashed when it came in to land at Sutton Bank. The pilot was taken to hospital but died later. The coroner ruled that his death was down to pilot error.	No	
2 October 2006	A mid-air collision between two gliders killed one pilot, who it is thought was trapped in his glider by G-forces. Debris was dropped over the A170, which had to be closed as a result. The other pilot suffered minimal injuries and parachuted to safety.	No	

== Notable members ==
- Nicholas Goodhart - joined in 1938 before his wartime Royal Naval service
- Amy Johnson - celebrated aviator, was a member in 1937
- Fred Slingsby - founder of Slingsby Aviation
- Philip Wills - competitive glider pilot
