= Slingsby Skylark 4 =

British competition glider, 1961

Skylark 4
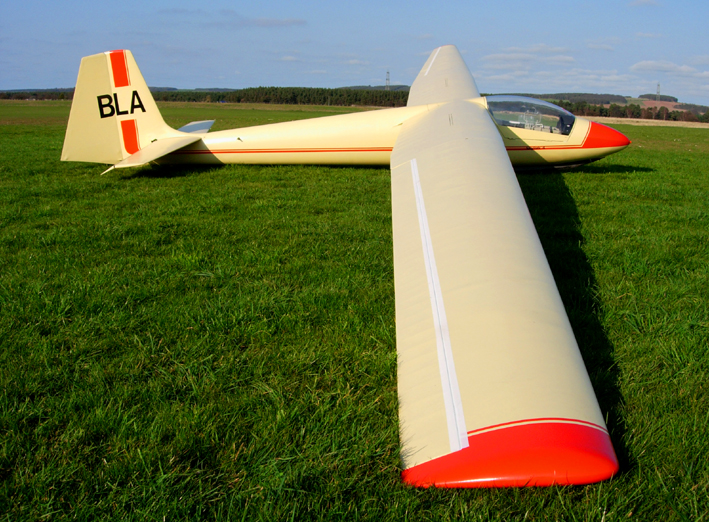
- Skylark IV BLA at Borders Gliding Club, Milfield, Northumberland

General information
- Type: Competition sailplane
- National origin: United Kingdom
- Manufacturer: Slingsby Sailplanes Ltd
- Number built: 65

History
- First flight: February 1961
- Developed from: Slingsby Skylark 3

The Slingsby T.50 Skylark 4 was a British single seat competition glider built by Slingsby Sailplanes in the early 1960s. It sold in numbers and had success at national, though not world level competition.

== Development ==
The Slingsby Skylark 4 is the final development of the Skylark series of gliders and was first manufactured in 1961 using an 18.2m span wing similar to that of the Skylark 3. About 30 Skylark 4s are still flying today (2010). Slingsby had introduced double curvature fuselage panels made of glass reinforced plastic (GRP) into their previous design, the T.49 Capstan and they remodelled the front of the wooden fuselage of the Skylark 3 in this material for the Skylark 4, introducing a reclining pilot's position and smoother canopy line. Though the previous wing planform, span and area was retained, its ailerons were extended to increase the rate of roll and the outer panels used a different airfoil section, the more cambered NACA 6415, to give a better lift distribution.

The Skylark 4 has a high wing with a single inner section of parallel chord extending out almost to mid span, followed by outer sections with taper on the trailing edges. Ailerons filled almost all of the outer sections and airbrakes, operating in pairs above and below the wings, are mounted on the main spar in the inboard section. The wing is wooden, built around a main spar of Spruce and a lighter rear spar and Gaboon ply covered from this rear spar forward. Behind this spar the wing was fabric covered, though the ailerons were ply skinned. The Gaboon ply was applied diagonally across the ribs, which produced a very smooth wing-surface that is claimed to generate a laminar airflow. This in turn gives a best-glide ratio of 1:36 which is comparable with early fibreglass gliders.

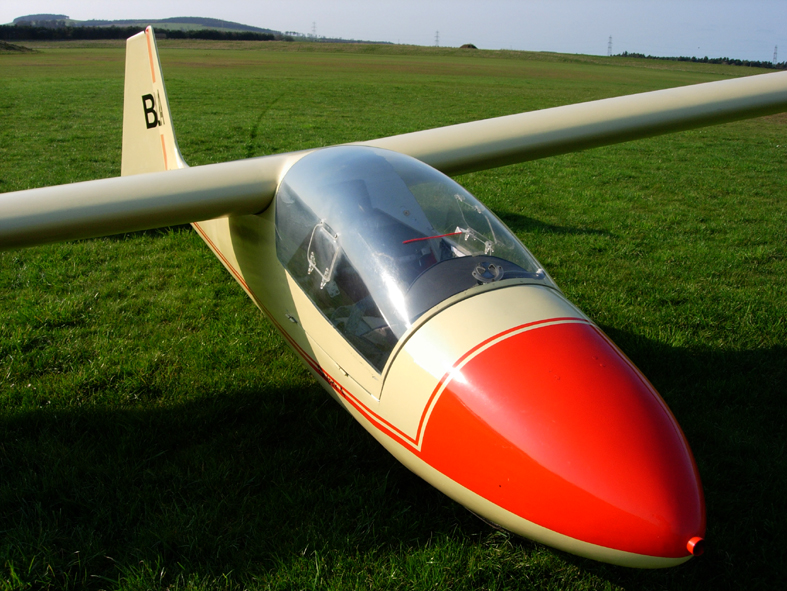
Skylark 4 BLA at Borders Gliding Club, Milfield, Northumberland

Behind the cockpit the fuselage is a semi-monocoque, elliptical in cross section and built around spruce frames with a plywood skin. The fuselage line no longer fell away rapidly behind the trailing edge, but continued straight to the tail, where tapered and clipped tailplane and elevators were mounted on top, far enough forward that the rudder hinge was behind the elevators. These surfaces were plywood covered. Fin and rudder together are tapered and flat topped; the fin is also ply-skinned, but the unbalanced rudder is fabric covered.

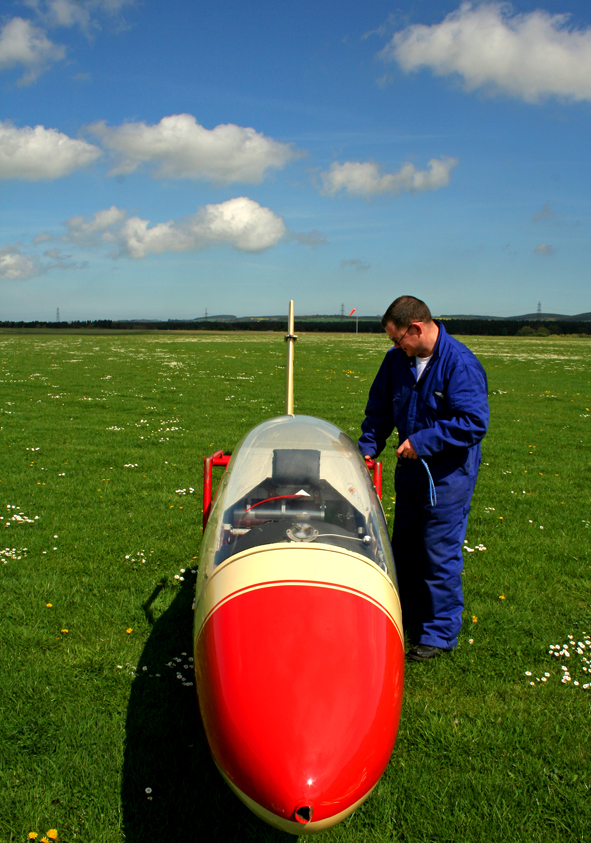
Skylark 4 fuselage prepared for rigging at Borders Gliding Club

The undercarriage was conventional, with a nose skid, fixed monowheel and tail bumper. A simple-friction wheelbrake is applied to the mainwheel by pulling on the airbrake lever at the end of its furthest travel.

The cockpit is immediately ahead of the wing leading-edge, enclosed with a lengthened perspex canopy, and the Skylark 4 was 80 mm (4 in) longer than its predecessor.

== Operational history ==
The Skylark 4 first flew in February 1961. 62 complete aircraft were built by Slingsby at Kirbymoorside and another 3 were assembled by Fred Dunn in New Zealand from kits that Slingsby supplied. 19 of Slingsby's 62 were exported.

The Skylark 4 failed to get into the top positions in the World Gliding Championships of 1963 and 1965. In 1963, at Junin, Argentina the four Skylark 4s of the British team were placed consecutively 8-11th, and a single entry came 9th in 1965 at South Cerney, UK. It performed better at the national level; Dick Johnson flew one into first place in the US National Gliding Championships in both 1963 and 1964. A Skylark 4 came second (to a Skylark 3) in the British Nationals at Lasham in 1964.

== Specifications ==
Data from Ellison 1971, p. 218The World's Sailplanes:Die Segelflugzeuge der Welt:Les Planeurs du Monde Volume II

General characteristics

- Crew: 1
- Length: 25 ft 0 in (7.62 m)
- Wingspan: 59 ft 9 in (18.2 m)
- Height: 3 ft 5 in (1.04 m) at cockpit
- Wing area: 173.0 sq ft (16.07 m^{2})
- Aspect ratio: 20.5
- Airfoil: NACA 63_{3}-620 inboard and NACA 6415 at tips
- Empty weight: 569 lb (258 kg)
- Gross weight: 829 lb (376 kg)

Performance

- Stall speed: 32 kn (37 mph, 60 km/h)
- Never exceed speed: 123 kn (142 mph, 228 km/h)
- Rough air speed max: 76 kn (87 mph; 141 km/h)
- Aerotow speed: 76 kn (87 mph; 141 km/h)
- Winch launch speed: 76 kn (87 mph; 141 km/h)
- g limits: +4, 0 at 120 kn (140 mph; 220 km/h)
- Rate of sink: 104 ft/min (0.53 m/s) at 37 kn (43 mph; 69 km/h)
- Lift-to-drag: 36 at 41 kn (47 mph; 76 km/h)
- Wing loading: 4.78 lb/sq ft (23.35 kg/m^{2})

== See also ==
Related development

- Slingsby Skylark 3
- Slingsby Dart

Related lists

- List of gliders
