= Fred Slingsby =

Fred Nicholas Slingsby
- Born: Frederick Nicholas Slingsby; 6 November 1894; Cambridge, Cambridgeshire, England
- Died: 21 May 1973 (aged 78); Ryedale, Yorkshire, England
- Occupation(s): Aviator, aircraft designer and manufacturer
- Known for: Slingsby Aviation

Frederick 'Fred' Nicholas Slingsby MM (6 November 1894 – 21 May 1973) was the founder of Slingsby Sailplanes Ltd (later Slingsby Aviation).

== Biography ==
Slingsby was born on 6 November 1894 in Cambridge, Cambridgeshire, the son of Reuben and Charlotte Slingsby, his father was a builder, carpenter and joiner.

Slingsby joined the Royal Flying Corps in 1914 as a gunner/observer. On one sortie the pilot was killed. Slingsby climbed out of his gun position and into the pilot's cockpit and regained control of the aircraft. He flew the aircraft back to the British lines. For this, he was awarded the Military Medal. After he left the service, now the RAF, in 1920, he bought a partnership in a woodworking and furniture factory in Queen Street, Scarborough.

Slingsby was a founder member of Scarborough Gliding Club, one of the first British gliding clubs in February 1930. By the end of that year, it had 40 active flying members. The first gliders were built in his factory on Queen Street, Scarborough. This was transferred to the town's abandoned tram sheds before a completely new factory was built in Kirbymoorside in 1934 and he abandoned furniture-making.

His first glider, in 1931, was a Falcon, which was a British version of the RRG Falke, built by Rhön-Rossitten Gesellschaft and designed by Alexander Lippisch. In 1933, Slingsby started producing RFD Daglings, as the Type 3. The initial wave of interest in gliding in Britain tailed off and by 1932 Scarborough Gliding Club was in financial trouble. It merged with another club, and further mergers produced the Yorkshire Gliding Club, based at Sutton Bank, near Thirsk. Philip Wills and Fred Slingsby negotiated the lease of the land at Sutton Bank.

With the outbreak of World War II in 1939 Slingsby changed production, initially building rudders for the Avro Anson although they sold a few gliders for radar experiments. Eventually an order was received for the design and production of the Hengist troop-carrying glider. In addition, Slingsby received orders for primary training gliders for the Royal Air Force's Air Training Corps (ATC). With the Hengist and training glider orders along with the repairs and manufacturing of spare parts, the Slingsby company was kept busy throughout the war. Anticipating the end of the war and the need for better training gliders for both the ATC and private clubs, Slingsby designed and built both a tandem and a side-by-side prototype glider to meet this need. This later design became the Slingsby T.21B Sedbergh. Other gliders followed (see Slingsby Aviation) until the company was merged into the Vickers Group in late 1969.

Fred Slingsby was awarded the Paul Tissander Diploma by the Fédération Aéronautique Internationale in 1957.

== Family life ==
Slingsby married Florrie Wade in Cambridge in 1918. He died aged 78 on 21 May 1973.

== Bibliography ==
- Unpublished biography by Walter Kahn 2008
- Slingsby Sailplanes, by Martin Simons, Airlife Publishing 1996 ISBN 1-85310-732-8
- Early gliding in the UK
- History of Slingsby gliders
