= Old Warden Aerodrome =

Old Warden Aerodrome Shuttleworth (Old Warden) Aerodrome
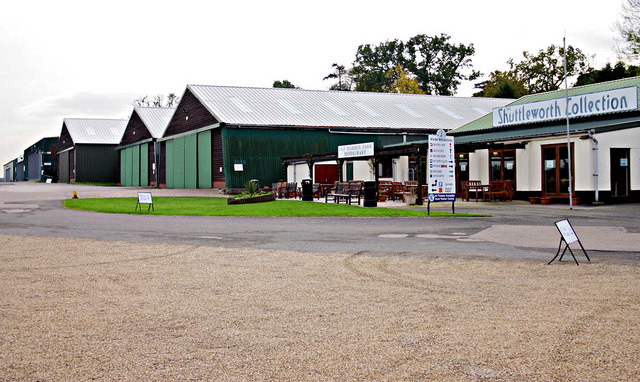
- Shuttleworth Collection hangars and other buildings holding collection exhibits
- IATA: none; ICAO: EGTH

Summary
- Airport type: Private
- Operator: The Shuttleworth Collection
- Serves: Shuttleworth Collection
- Location: Old Warden
- Elevation AMSL: 110 ft / 34 m
- Coordinates: 52°05′12″N 000°19′07″W
- Website: www.shuttleworth.org/

Map
- Location in Bedfordshire

Runways
Direction	Length		Surface
Direction	m	ft	Surface
03/21	508	1,667	Grass
- Sources: UK AIP at NATS

Old Warden Aerodrome (ICAO: EGTH) is located 7 miles (11 km) east-southeast of Bedford, in Bedfordshire, England. The privately owned aerodrome serves The Shuttleworth Collection, which contains a large working collection of vintage aircraft, cars, motor cycles and agricultural vehicles and equipment.

The airfield is home to the Cambridge Flying Group, who operate two de Havilland Tiger Moth aircraft, G-AHIZ and G-AOEI.
