= Slingsby King Kite =

British single-seat glider, 1937

Slingsby T.9 King Kite

General information
- Type: Glider
- National origin: England
- Manufacturer: Slingsby
- Designer: Mungo Buxton, John Sproule, Fred Slingsby and Peter Shaw
- Number built: 3 + 1 replica

History
- First flight: 17 April 1937

The Slingsby T.9 King Kite is a British glider designed and built by Slingsby that first flew in 1937.

== Design and development ==
ISTUS (international commission for the study of motorless flight) launched a campaign for gliding's inclusion in the Olympic games, organising an international competition, planned for 4–17 July 1937 for aspiring national teams. The British Gliding Association (BGA) were in a quandary as the only suitable aircraft was the Buxton Hjordis. To replace it Mungo Buxton had started the design of the Hjordis 2 but due to his commitments as a serving RAF officer Buxton handed over the design to Slingsby, Sproule and Shaw to complete the aircraft. Buxton had studied the latest soaring techniques and came to the conclusion that competitive aircraft would need to fly efficiently at higher speeds and not sacrifice glide performance for climb performance.

The result of their efforts, the Slingsby Type 9 King Kite, emerged as a cantilevered gull wing sailplane with wooden structure covered by plywood throughout, except for fabric covered ailerons, tailpane, elevators and rudder. A large comfortable cockpit housed the pilot under a canopy built up from single curved pieces of plexiglas. To ensure full aileron control at high speed it was necessary to build a stiff wing with ribs at half the normal spacing with a deep laminated timber main spar. The trailing edges of the wings were taken up by landing flaps inboard of the gull joint and ailerons outboard.

=== Flight tests ===
The first King Kite made its maiden flight on 17 April 1937, with Philip Wills at the controls. Flight tests of the King Kite revealed a tendency to enter spins easily, and more importantly, a reluctance to recover from spins. To alleviate the problem while a permanent solution was found the rudder was increased in size twice, initially in span and later in chord.

=== Wasserkuppe 1937 International Competition ===
The three King Kites, Hjordis and the Falcon III were all shipped to Wasserkuppe in time for the 1937 international competition. The first launch for the British team ended in disaster when Willy Watt, in a King Kite, on his first ever bungee launch attempted to turn immediately after the bungee slipped off the hook, the King Kite spun into the ground disintegrating around the dazed Watt. John Nielan also had an episode with spinning, recovering at very low altitude and then continuing on a cross-country competition task. The reason for the King Kites handling problems was attributed to the inner wing being jigged improperly in the factory, so rectification on the three already built King Kites was impossible.

=== After Wasserkuppe ===
After their return from Wasserkuppe the two remaining King Kites flew very little before the out break of the Second World War. Both aircraft were impressed by the RAF for use by ATC officers, one breaking up in flight during 1946 and the other transferred to the RAFGSA (Royal Air Force Gliding & Soaring Association) at Detling where it was scrapped in 1950, after glued joints were found to have failed.

=== Re-birth of the King Kite ===
In 1978 the blueprints were recovered from storage and a replica King Kite was built by David Jones using modern low drag wing profiles, with advice from Professor Wortmann at Akaflieg Stuttgart.

== Specifications (Slingsby T.9 King Kite) ==
Data from Jane's World Sailplanes & Motor Gliders

General characteristics

- Crew: 1
- Length: 20 ft 7.9 in (6.297 m)
- Wingspan: 50 ft 10 in (15.5 m)
- Wing area: 166.8 sq ft (15.50 m^{2})
- Aspect ratio: 18
- Airfoil: root: NACA 23021; tip: NACA 43121
- Empty weight: 429 lb (195 kg) 1
- Gross weight: 620 lb (281 kg) 1

Performance

- Maximum glide ratio: 25
- Wing loading: 4.24 lb/sq ft (20.7 kg/m^{2})
