= Slingsby Skylark 3 =

British single-seat glider, 1957

Skylark 3
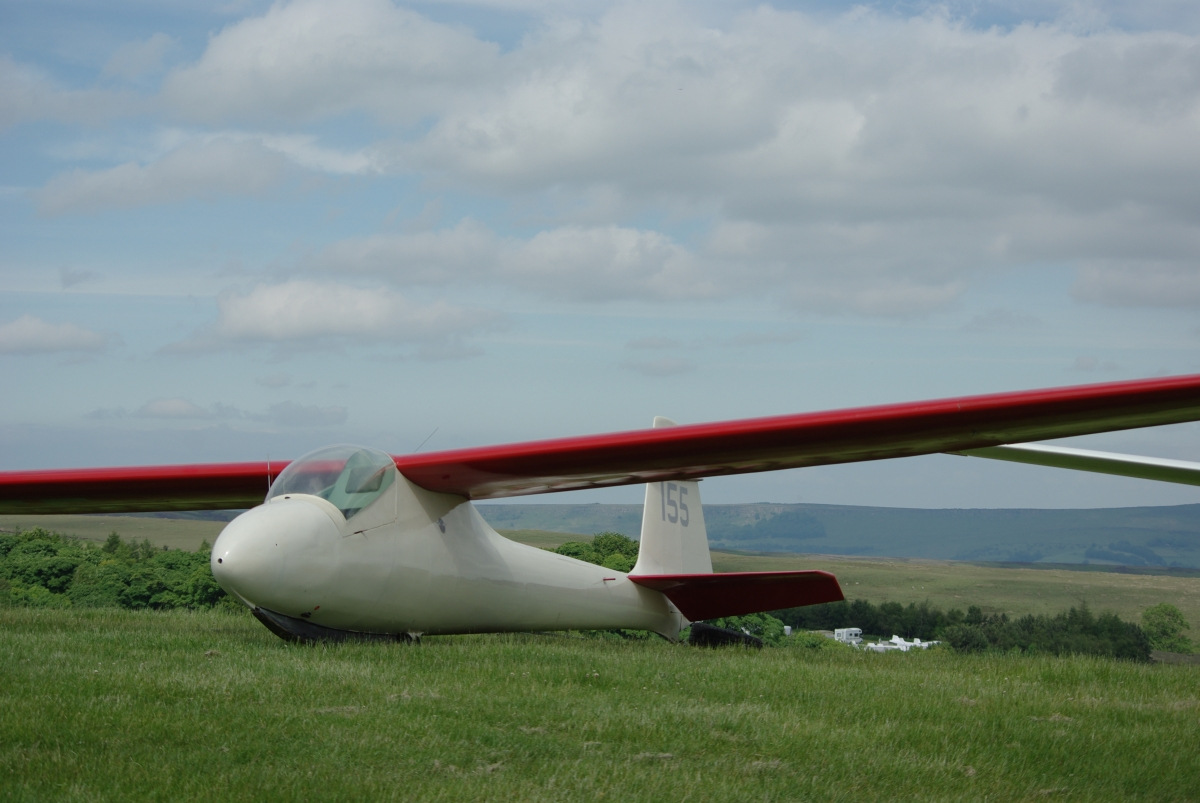

General information
- Type: Open class sailplane
- National origin: United Kingdom
- Manufacturer: Slingsby Sailplanes Ltd.
- Number built: 70

History
- First flight: July 1953
- Developed from: Slingsby Skylark 2

The Slingsby T.43 Skylark 3 was a single seat Open Class sailplane developed from the Skylark 2 with an extended wingspan. It won the 1960 World Gliding Championships.

== Development ==
The first of Slingsby's Skylark series to go into production was the Skylark 2, a single seat competition sailplane with a span of just under 15 m. Its successor, the Skylark 3 had much in common, but had a span increased to over 18 m and a consequent increase in aspect ratio. It, too went into production and sold in numbers.

The Skylark 3 had high, pylon mounted wings with an inner section of parallel chord extending out almost to mid span, followed by an outer section with taper on the trailing edge. Ailerons filled much of the outer sections and airbrakes, operating in pairs above and below the wings, were mounted on the main spar in the inboard section. The structure of the wing, like that of the rest of the aircraft was wooden, built around a main spar and a lighter rear spar and Gaboon ply covered from this rear spar forward. Behind this spar the wing was fabric covered, though the ailerons were ply skinned. The fuselage was a semi-monocoque, elliptical in cross section and built around spruce frames with a plywood skin. The cockpit was immediately ahead of the pylon and wing leading edge, enclosed with a perspex canopy. Tapered and clipped tailplane and elevators were mounted on top of the fuselage, far enough forward that the rudder hinge was behind the elevators. These surfaces were plywood covered. Fin and rudder together were tapered and flat topped; the fin was also ply skinned, but the unbalanced rudder was fabric covered. Compared with the Skylark 2, vertical tail areas were increased by 35% and horizontal areas by 23%. The undercarriage was conventional, with a nose skid, fixed monowheel and a small, faired tailskid.

The Skylark 3 flew for the first time in July 1953. 70 were built; of at least 7 subtypes, the 3A, 3B and 3F were the most numerous.

== Operational history ==
The high point of the Skylark 3's competitive career was at the 1960 World Gliding Championships, held at Cologne in Germany, where it was flown by the Swedish-Argentinian Rolf Hossinger into first place. It was the last British-designed sailplane to win the championships. Most went to UK gliding clubs and individuals, but a few were exported including a few to the Korean Air Force. Some, following standard Slingsby practice, were sold as kits, both within the UK and to New Zealand.

The Skylark 3 still holds the British gliding record for a 'declared 500 km goal' which was set by Nick Goodhart on 11 May 1959 when he flew 360 miles from Lasham in England to Portmoak in Scotland. Goodhart launched from Lasham at 13:03 and landed at Portmoak at 19:30 hours, after an epic flight in which he had successively used: hill-lift, thermal-lift and wave, cloud climbs to 18,000 ft inside a cumulonimbus cloud, and a further climb to 15,500 ft inside cumulus. This is still the UK goal-distance-record for gliders of wingspan not greater than 20 metres; and the speed record for a 500 km goal flight (2010) which is remarkable given the vastly improved performance of modern fibreglass gliders, as compared to the relatively low performance of the wood and fabric Skylark 3.

== Variants ==
Ellison 1971, pp. 212, 264–5

Skylark 3A
first production subtype. 7 built.
Skylark 3B
cockpit moved forward 76 mm, overall length increase by 80 mm. 24 built.
Skylark 3C
3A with strengthened spars to meet certification requirements. 2 built.
Skylark 3D
3B with strengthened spars to meet certification requirements. 2 built.
Skylark 3E
modified 3B with wing a tip section of NACA 64,_{2},615 and narrower ailerons. 1 built.
Skylark 3F
tab assisted ailerons and an increase in tailplane span from 2.88 m to 3.23 m. 30 built including kits.
Skylark 3G
modified F with increased span, narrower ailerons. 4 built.
Slingsby T.47
A proposed extended span version of the Skylark 3 with 20 metre wings

Note:A retrospective alteration increasing the all up weight of the 3A and 3B to 830 lb was incorporated into the 3F and 3G.

== Specifications (Skylark 3A) ==
Data from Ellison 1971, pp. 211–2

General characteristics

- Crew: 1
- Length: 24 ft 9 in (7.54 m)
- Wingspan: 59 ft 8.0 in (18.186 m)
- Wing area: 173 sq ft (16.1 m^{2})
- Aspect ratio: 20.5
- Airfoil: NACA 63_{3}-620 at root, NACA 4415 at tip
- Empty weight: 558 lb (253 kg)
- Max takeoff weight: 789 lb (358 kg)

Performance

- Stall speed: 31 kn (36 mph, 58 km/h)
- Never exceed speed: 117 kn (134 mph, 216 km/h)
- Maximum glide ratio: 32:1 at 40 kn (74 km/h; 46 mph)
- Rate of sink: 110 ft/min (0.56 m/s) minimum, at 35 kn (65 km/h; 40 mph)
- Wing loading: 4.5 lb/sq ft (22.2 kg/m^{2})

== See also ==
Related development

- Slingsby Skylark 2
- Slingsby Skylark 4

Related lists

- List of gliders
