= Slingsby Aviation =

Aircraft company in North Yorkshire, England

Slingsby Advanced Composites
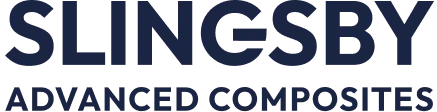
- Slingsby Advanced Composites logo
- Industry: Aerospace
- Founded: 1931
- Founder: Fred Slingsby
- Headquarters: Kirkbymoorside, North Yorkshire, United Kingdom
- Key people: Carl Morse, General Manager
- Products: gliders, light aircraft
- Owner: Axvik Group AB
- Website: slingsbyac.com

Slingsby Aviation was a British aircraft manufacturer based in Kirkbymoorside, North Yorkshire, England. The company was founded to design and build gliders. From the early 1930s to around 1970 it built over 50% of all British club gliders and had success at national and international level competitions. It then produced some powered aircraft, notably the composite built Firefly trainer, before becoming a producer of specialised composite materials and components.

The business now operates as Slingsby Advanced Composites, part of Axvik Group AB (publ), a Swedish aerospace and defence company. It produces composite structures for ships, submarines, and aircraft.

== History ==
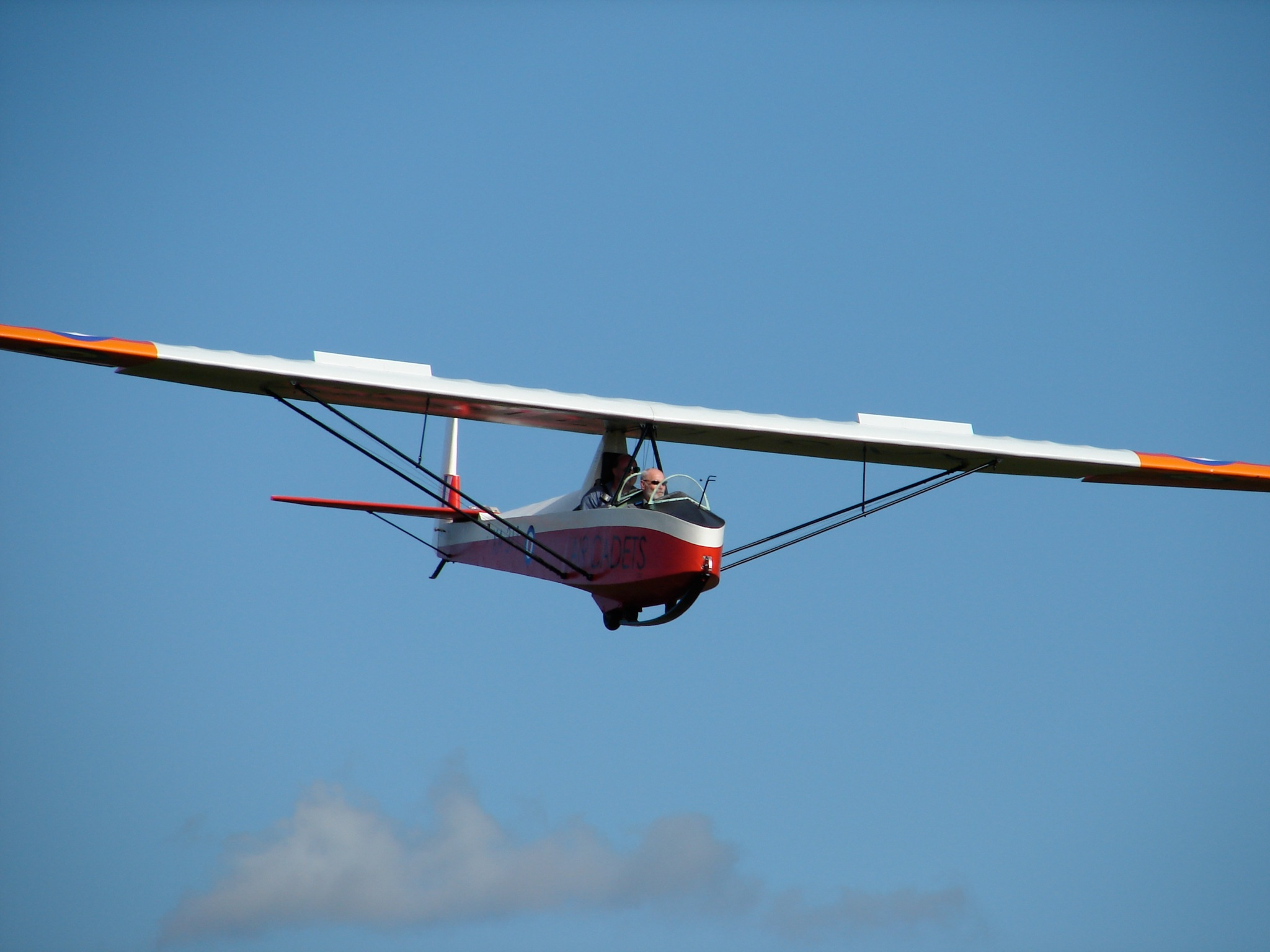
Slingsby T.31

The business was founded in Scarborough by Frederick Nicholas Slingsby, an RAF pilot in World War I. In 1920 he bought a partnership in a woodworking and furniture factory in Queen Street, Scarborough. In 1930 Slingsby was one of the founders of the Scarborough Gliding Club. After repairing some of the club's gliders, Slingsby's business built its first aircraft, a German designed RRG Falke which flew in 1931. By late 1933 Slingsby was advertising training gliders for sale. In 1934, encouraged by a local landowner, the business moved to Kirkbymoorside, some 30 miles from Scarborough, operating as Slingsby, Russell & Brown Ltd. As demand for gliders built up, a new factory was needed and built in Welburn, just outside Kirkbymoorside. This opened in July 1939, when Slingsby Sailplanes Ltd was founded. The best selling Slingsby glider in the pre-World War II period was the Primary.

During the war Slingsby built parts for other companies' aircraft as well as their own military glider, the Slingsby Hengist, though the latter did not see action. Towards the end of the war and afterwards the company produced large numbers of training gliders for the Air Training Corps (ATC). After the war Slingsby continued to make increasingly refined gliders for civilian use in clubs and competitions. Their greatest success was with the Sky at the 1952 World Gliding Championships, which finished in first, third and fourth place. The later Slingsby Skylark series was their post war best seller. Slingsby began to move toward glass reinforced plastic (GRP) and metal construction methods, but the company, trading as Slingsby Aircraft Ltd since 1967, went into liquidation in July 1969 following a disastrous fire in the previous November.

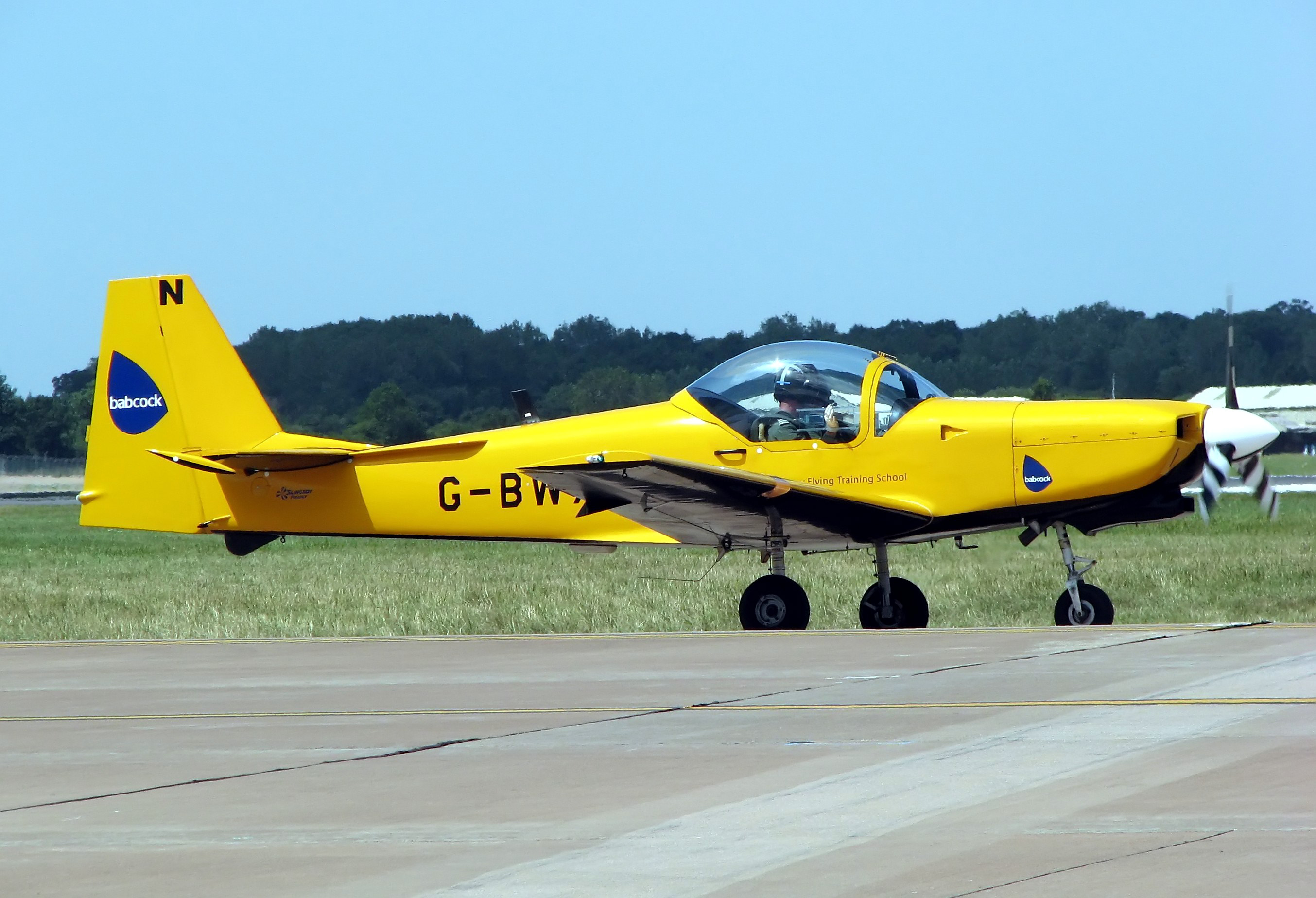
Slingsby Firefly T67M of the UK Defence Elementary Flying Training School, used for training Army and Navy student pilots.

After this Slingsby became part of the Vickers Group in November 1969, initially as Vickers-Slingsby Sailplanes Ltd, then reverting to the old name of Slingsby Sailplanes Ltd, and original design declined, though they built versions of other aircraft, both powered and unpowered. Slingsby’s last glider, which was also their last original design, was the GRP Slingsby T.65 Vega. This ceased production in 1982, by which time high performance sailplane design had moved away from the UK. During the upheavals in the British aerospace and marine sector the company became Slingsby Engineering, part of the public/private holding company British Underwater Engineering (UBE). In July 1982 Slingsby Aviation was set up by, and as part, of Slingsby Engineering. Slingsby Aviation passed from UBE to ML holdings in 1993, then to Cobham plc in December 1995.

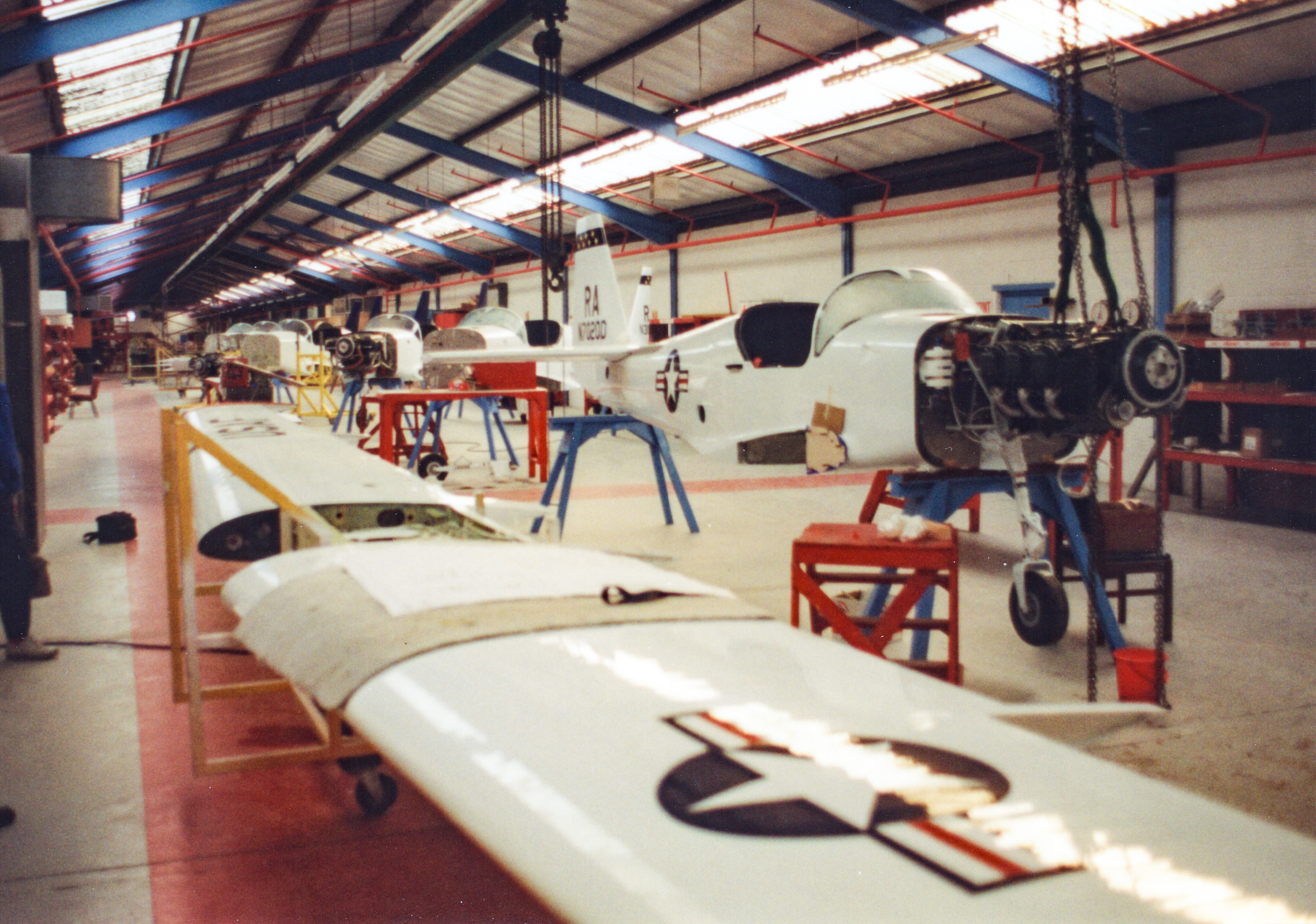
T-67/T-3A Firefly production line

Slingsby's last aircraft was the T-67 Firefly, a two-seater military training aircraft, originally a René Fournier design but structurally reworked by Slingsby into a wholly composite machine. At this time Slingsby Aviation employed around 130 people on its 12,220 square metre (131,000 square feet) site. The company had its own airfield at Kirkbymoorside with a 750-metre reinforced grass runway. Slingsby Aviation’s SAH 2200 hovercraft has operated in such varied regions as the Arctic Circle and Africa. Two are seen in the James Bond film, Die Another Day.

On 10 August 2006 the name of the company was changed to Slingsby Advanced Composites. Since then the company was owned by three individuals and was no longer a part of Cobham plc.

Logo used in 2013

On 8 January 2010, Marshall Aerospace of Cambridge acquired Slingsby Advanced Composites and rebranded the company as Marshall Slingsby Advanced Composites.

In June 2025, Marshall Group sold Slingsby Advanced Composites to Axvik Group AB (publ), a Swedish company building a portfolio of specialist European aerospace and defence manufacturers. The company reverted to trading as Slingsby Advanced Composites.

In 2020, the Company, then trading as Marshall Slingsby Advanced Composites, won the Aerospace Company of the Year in the Corporate Live Wire North England Prestige Awards.

== Aircraft ==
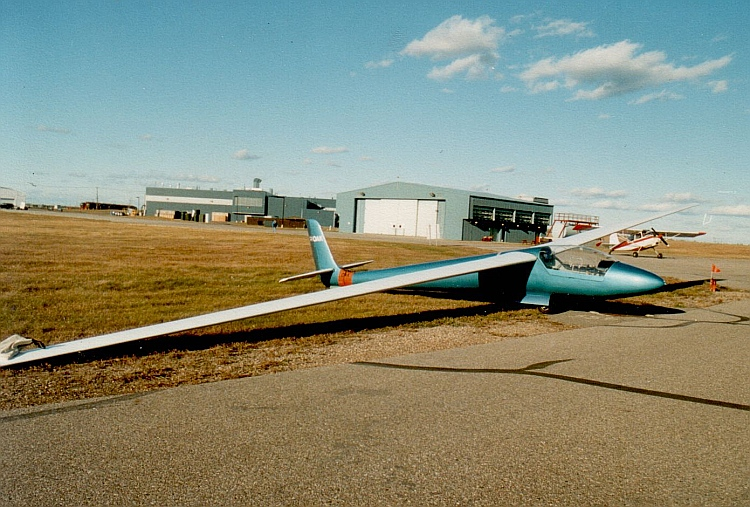
Slingsby Dart 17R glider

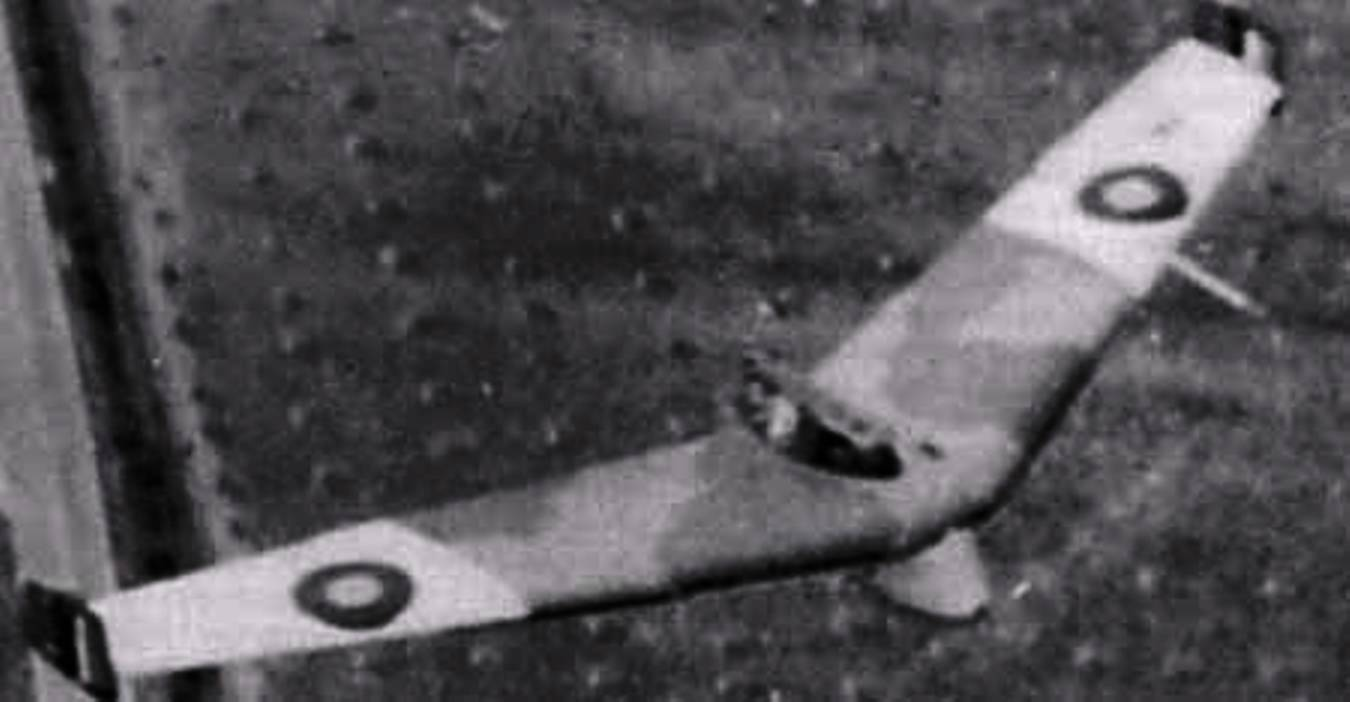
Baynes Bat third scale experimental tank carrier, not a Slingsby design but built by them

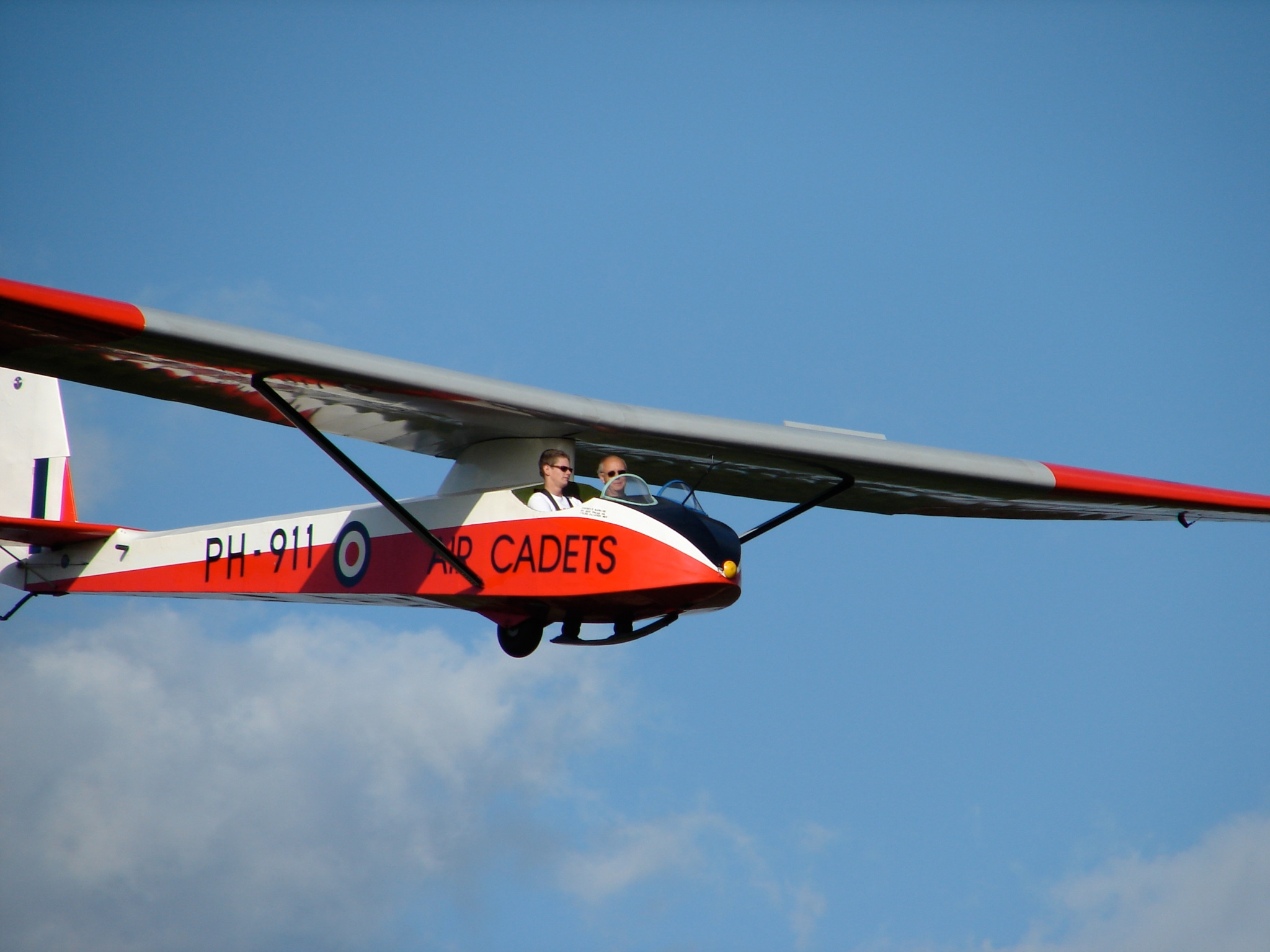
T.21B

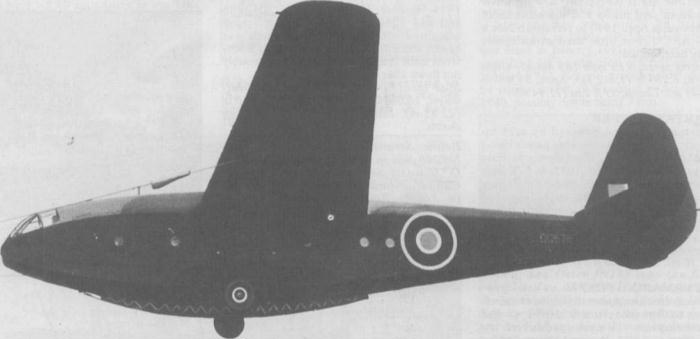
Hengist 15 seat military glider

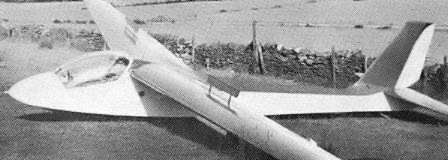
Slingsby Capstan glider

- Baynes Bat – experimental glider 1943
- Buxton Hjordis
- CAMCO IIA – not completed
- Slingsby T.1 Falcon 1 – single seat sport glider 1931
- Slingsby T.2 Falcon 2
- Slingsby T.3 Primary (Dagling)
- Slingsby T.4 Falcon 3
- Slingsby T.5 Grunau Baby
- Slingsby T.6 Kirby Kite
- Slingsby T.7 Kirby Cadet (Cadet TX.1)
- Slingsby T.8 Kirby Tutor (Cadet TX.2)
- Slingsby T.9 King Kite
- Slingsby T.12 Kirby Gull 1
- Slingsby T.13 Petrel
- Slingsby T.14 Gull 2
- Slingsby T.15 Gull 3
- Slingsby T.17 – military transport glider project to meet Air Ministry Specification 10/40, not built.
- Slingsby T.18 Hengist – military glider 1942
- Slingsby T.19 (target glider)
- Slingsby T.20
- Slingsby T.21 (Sedbergh TX.1)
- Slingsby T.23 Kite 1A
- Slingsby T.24 Falcon 4
- Slingsby T.25 Gull 4
- Slingsby T.26 Kite 2
- Slingsby T.29A/B Motor Tutor
- Slingsby T.30 Prefect
- Slingsby T.31 Tandem Tutor (Cadet TX.3)
- Slingsby T.34 Sky
- Slingsby T.35 Austral
- Slingsby T.37 Skylark 1
- Slingsby T.38 Grasshopper TX.1
- Slingsby T.41 Skylark 2
- Slingsby T.42 Eagle
- Slingsby T.43 Skylark 3
- Slingsby T.45 Swallow
- Slingsby T.46 (a.k.a. T.21C)
- Slingsby T.49 Capstan
- Slingsby T.50 Skylark 4
- Slingsby T.51 Dart
- Slingsby T.53
- Slingbsy T.56 S.E.5A replica Currie Wot based
- Slingsby T.57 Sopwith Camel replica
- Slingsby T.58 Rumpler C.IV replica
- Slingsby HP-14C – redesign of Schreder HP-14
- Slingsby T.59 Kestrel
- Slingsby T.61 Falke (Venture T.1/T.2)
- Slingsby T.65 Vega
- Slingsby T.66 Nipper Mk 3
- Slingsby T.67 Firefly
