= Slingsby Tandem Tutor =

British two-seat glider, 1949

T.31B Tandem Tutor
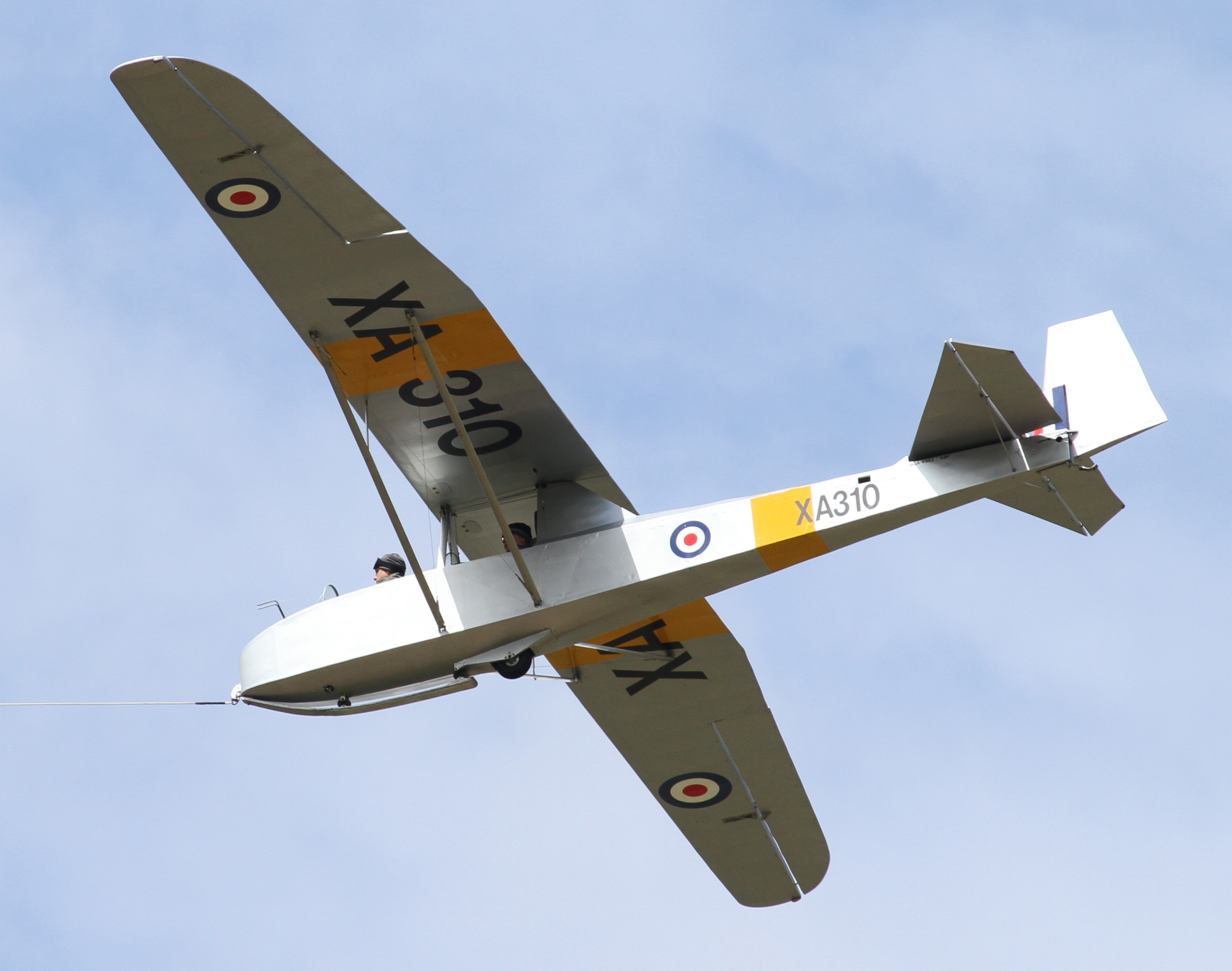

General information
- Type: Training glider
- National origin: United Kingdom
- Manufacturer: Slingsby Sailplanes Ltd
- Primary user: Royal Air Force
- Number built: ca. 230

History
- First flight: 1949
- Developed from: Slingsby Tutor

The T.31 Tandem Tutor is a British military training glider, designed and built by Slingsby and used in large numbers by the Air Training Corps between 1951 and 1986.

== Design and development ==
The T.31 was a tandem two-seat development of the T.8 Tutor (RAF Cadet TX.2). The fuselage was based on that of the T.29 Motor Tutor, increased in length and widened slightly; the wings and tail were unchanged. A single T.31A prototype was flown in 1949, followed by the production T.31B, with spoilers and a small additional wing bracing strut.

== Operational history ==
Chief customer for the T.31B was the Royal Air Force for Air Cadet training; its aircraft were designated as Cadet TX Mark 3. As it was so similar to their existing single-seaters, it allowed easy conversion to solo. The RAF took delivery of 126 TX.3s between 1951 and 1959.

It also found a market with civilian clubs in the UK, although most of these were built from kits and spares, using existing Tutor wings. T.31s were exported to Burma, Ceylon, Israel, Jordan, Lebanon, Pakistan and Rhodesia. In addition, small numbers were built in Argentina, Israel and New Zealand. The T.35 Austral was a one-off development with span increased to 15.64 m (51 ft 3¾ in), sold to the Waikerie Gliding Club in Australia in 1952

After the RAF Cadet TX.3s were replaced by GRP gliders in the mid-1980s, the fleet was sold off, but never gained the same popularity with civilian owners as the side-by-side T.21, being a cheaper glider designed for "circuits and bumps", and only marginally soarable. Some were instead converted to simple ultra-light aircraft as Motor Cadets, with the front cockpit replaced by a Volkswagen or similar engine, and a three-point undercarriage.

== Aircraft on display ==
- US Southwest Soaring Museum

Royal Air Force Museum, Hendon.

RAF Manston History Museum has Slingsby Cadet TX.3 VM791 on display marked up as XA312

== Operators ==
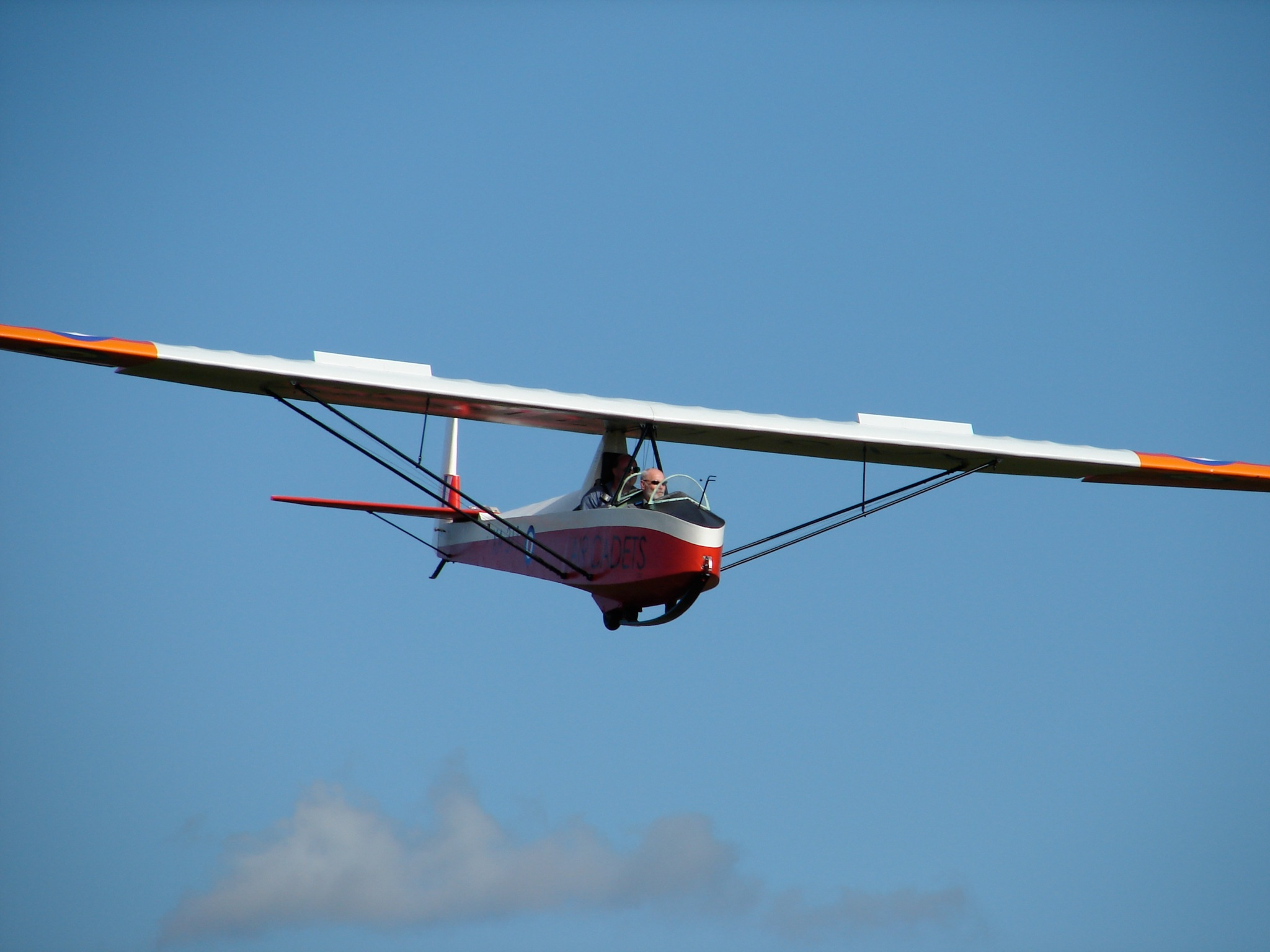
A 1961 Slingsby T-31 (Cadet TX3) sailplane, Belgian registry OO-ZMQ, serial number XA-311. This aircraft is stationed at an airfield in Weelde, Belgium.

United Kingdom

- Royal Air Force
  - Air Training Corps

== Specifications (Slingsby T.31 Tandem Tutor) ==
Data from Coates, Andrew. "Jane's World Sailplanes & Motor Gliders new edition". London, Jane's. 1980. ISBN 0-7106-0017-8

General characteristics

- Crew: 2
- Length: 23 ft 3.5 in (7.1 m)
- Wingspan: 43 ft 3.5 in (13.2 m)
- Wing area: 170.1 sq ft (15.8 m^{2})
- Aspect ratio: 11.1
- Airfoil: Göttingen 426
- Empty weight: 388 lb (176 kg)
- Gross weight: 829 lb (376 kg)

Performance

- Maximum speed: 81 mph (130 km/h, 70 kn)
- Stall speed: 38 mph (61 km/h, 33 kn)
- Maximum glide ratio: 18.5 at 45 mph (73 km/h; 39 kn)
- Rate of sink: 206 ft/min (1.05 m/s) at 41 mph (66 km/h; 36 kn)

== See also ==
Related development

- Slingsby Kirby Cadet
- Slingsby Tutor

Related lists

- List of aircraft of the Royal Air Force
- List of gliders
