= Samlesbury Aerodrome =

Defunct airfield near Preston, England

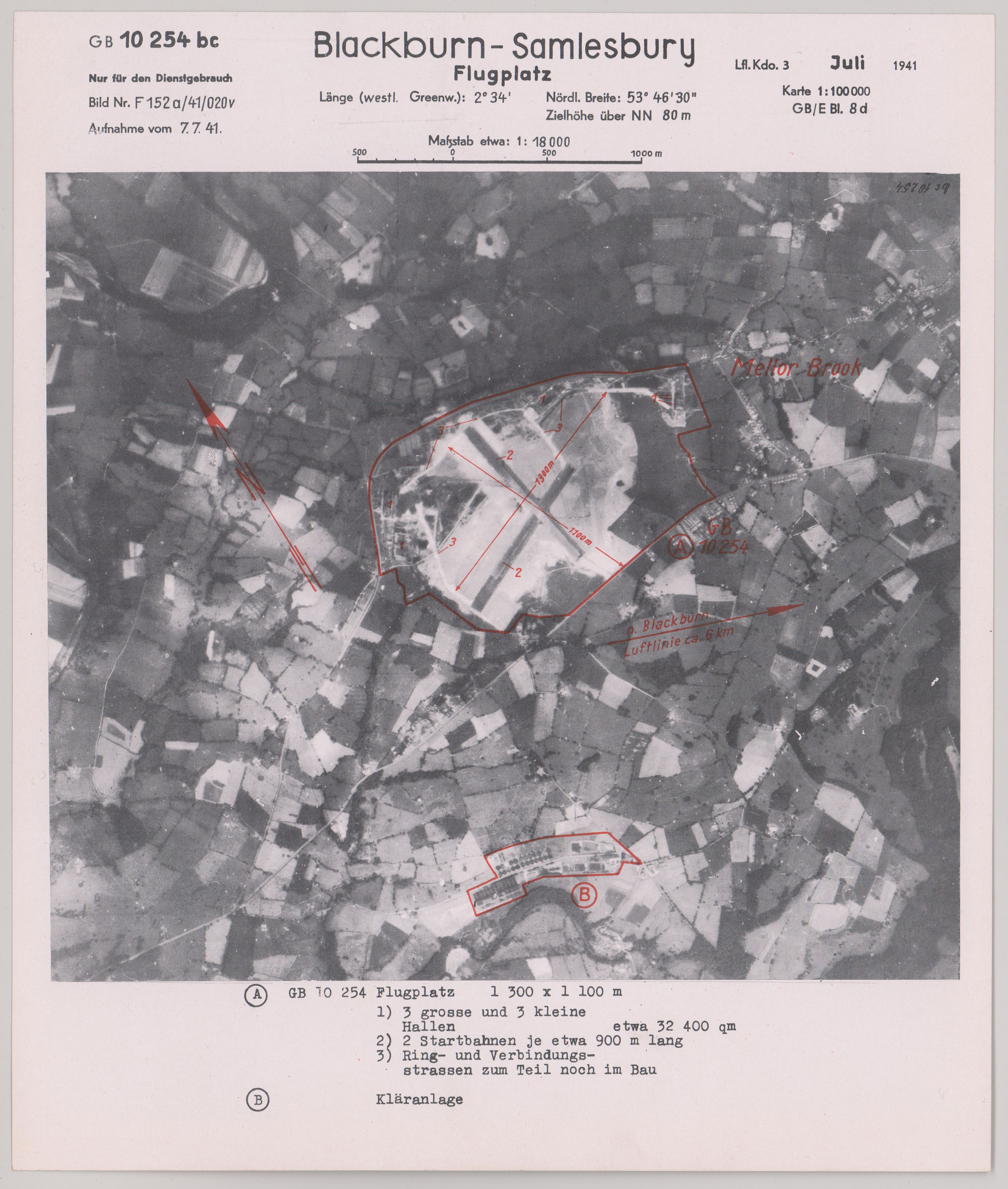
- Samlesbury Aerodrome on a target dossier of the German Luftwaffe, July 1941
- IATA: none; ICAO: ~~EGNG~~

Summary
- Airport type: Private
- Operator: BAE Systems
- Location: Balderstone, Lancashire
- Elevation AMSL: 250 ft / 75 m
- Coordinates: 53°46′24″N 002°34′10″W

Map
- Location in Lancashire

Runways
Direction	Length		Surface
Direction	ft	m	Surface
08/26	7,946	2,422	Bituminous
11/29	3,300	1,006	Bituminous
- As of 1980

Samlesbury Aerodrome is a disused airfield at Balderstone near Samlesbury and Blackburn in the Ribble Valley district of Lancashire. The aerodrome is owned by defence company BAE Systems, which uses the site for the manufacture of several different aircraft. Currently the company employs approximately 3,000 people at the site. The aerodrome is part of Lancashire Enterprise Zone.

== History ==
The site, once an active aerodrome, dates back to 1922 when it was proposed that a municipal airfield be constructed to serve the nearby towns of Blackburn and Preston.

Construction did not begin until April 1939, but was then accelerated by the Second World War, when the Air Ministry instructed English Electric (EE) to construct flight shed number 1. The first of the Handley Page Hampdens built by EE made its maiden flight on 22 February 1940. By 1942, 770 Hampdens had been delivered from Samlesbury.

In 1940, a second factory was built and the runway was extended so that construction of the Handley Page Halifax could begin. By 1945, all five main hangars and three runways had been completed, and by the end of the year a total of 2,145 Halifaxes had been produced at Samlesbury.

During the war, the site was also home to Hawker Hurricanes and Airspeed Oxfords operated by the Communications Flight of No. 9 Group RAF, whose headquarters were at the nearby Barton Hall. The airfield was only bombed once, when a few incendiaries were dropped, some hitting the village of Balderstone.

From the last years of the war, large-scale production of aircraft by EE at Samlesbury continued:

- de Havilland Vampire – Various versions built under sub-contract 1944–1952, total 1,369

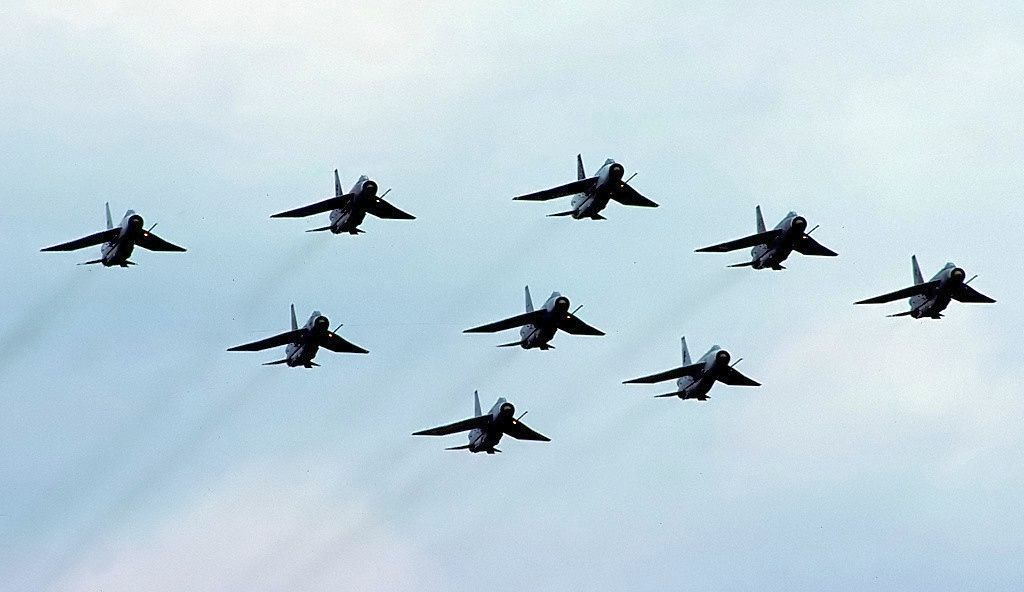
All Lightnings were built at Samlesbury

- English Electric Canberra – The first aircraft since the 1920s designed and built by English Electric. Built 1949–1959 and 1964, total 631
- English Electric Lightning – This was the only production site for the Lightning and its prototypes. Built 1953–1972, total 341 (including BAC production).

EE was involved in other work during this period. For example, they gained a contract to fit radar, radio and navigation equipment to 200 Avro Lincolns between 1945 and 1948. The site has also produced parts for aircraft including the Anglo-French Concorde and the ill-fated BAC TSR-2.

When English Electric merged in 1960 to become BAC and later British Aerospace (BAE), it worked closely with the nearby sister plant at BAE Warton, and the former BAE factory in Preston, on building the SEPECAT Jaguar and Panavia Tornado fighter aircraft.

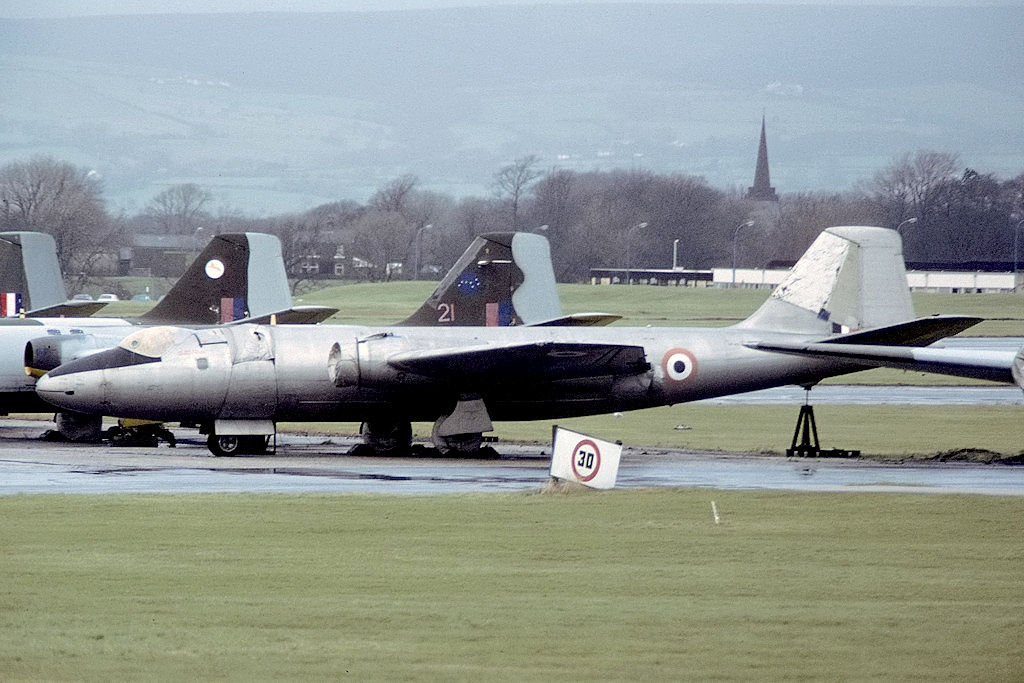
Indian Air Force Canberra T4 Q497 stored at Samlesbury in 1986

From the 1950s to the 1970s, as well as aircraft production, the airfield was heavily engaged in upgrading and refurbishing English Electric aircraft, especially Canberras. Many aircraft passed through before redelivery to the RAF, or for onward sale to the air forces of, for example, Argentina, Rhodesia, India, Venezuela, Peru and Ethiopia. Many airframes were also scrapped here.

In the post-war period the airfield was sometimes referred to as Preston/Blackburn Airfield

=== Samlesbury Engineering ===
Around 1943, Lancashire Aircraft Corporation (LAC) and its subsidiary Samlesbury Engineering were established at the airfield. As a Civilian Repair Organisation, they won contracts for repairing Bristol Beaufighters and Beauforts. After the war, Samlesbury Engineering took over some of English Electric's buildings and, as well as producing parts for the aviation industry, was supporting the LAC Halifaxes and Haltons involved in the Berlin Airlift in 1948–49. After this, Samlesbury Engineering diversified into building buses, coaches and trucks, but the business started to run down and they returned the hangars to English Electric and took over Burnley Aircraft Products, moving into their premises on the south side of the airfield. The latter company had assembled and tested Beauforts and Beaufighters at Samlesbury during the war and been involved in highly classified aircraft interception radar testing with the Beaufighters.

With Samlesbury Engineering's specialist aviation and vehicle experience, in 1954 they built the turbojet-powered Bluebird K7 hydroplane for Donald Campbell's water speed record runs.

=== Light aircraft ===
Immediately after WW2, RAF No.1 Gliding School moved into Samlesbury, flying Slingsby Cadet TX.1 and TX.3, Grunau Baby and Sedburgh TX.1 gliders. This was disbanded in December 1949.

In 1958, Samlesbury Engineering set up a new subsidiary, confusingly named Lancashire Aircraft Company, to produce an updated version of the Edgar Percival E.P.9 utility aircraft, for which it had bought the rights. It named the updated aircraft the Lancashire Aircraft Prospector, and production, at first based at Blackpool (Squires Gate) Airport, was moved to Samlesbury in 1960. Only six were built and in 1963 the operation moved to Lympne Airport where it closed down in the following year. Samlesbury Engineering sold off its vehicle business and the remains were absorbed into BAC.

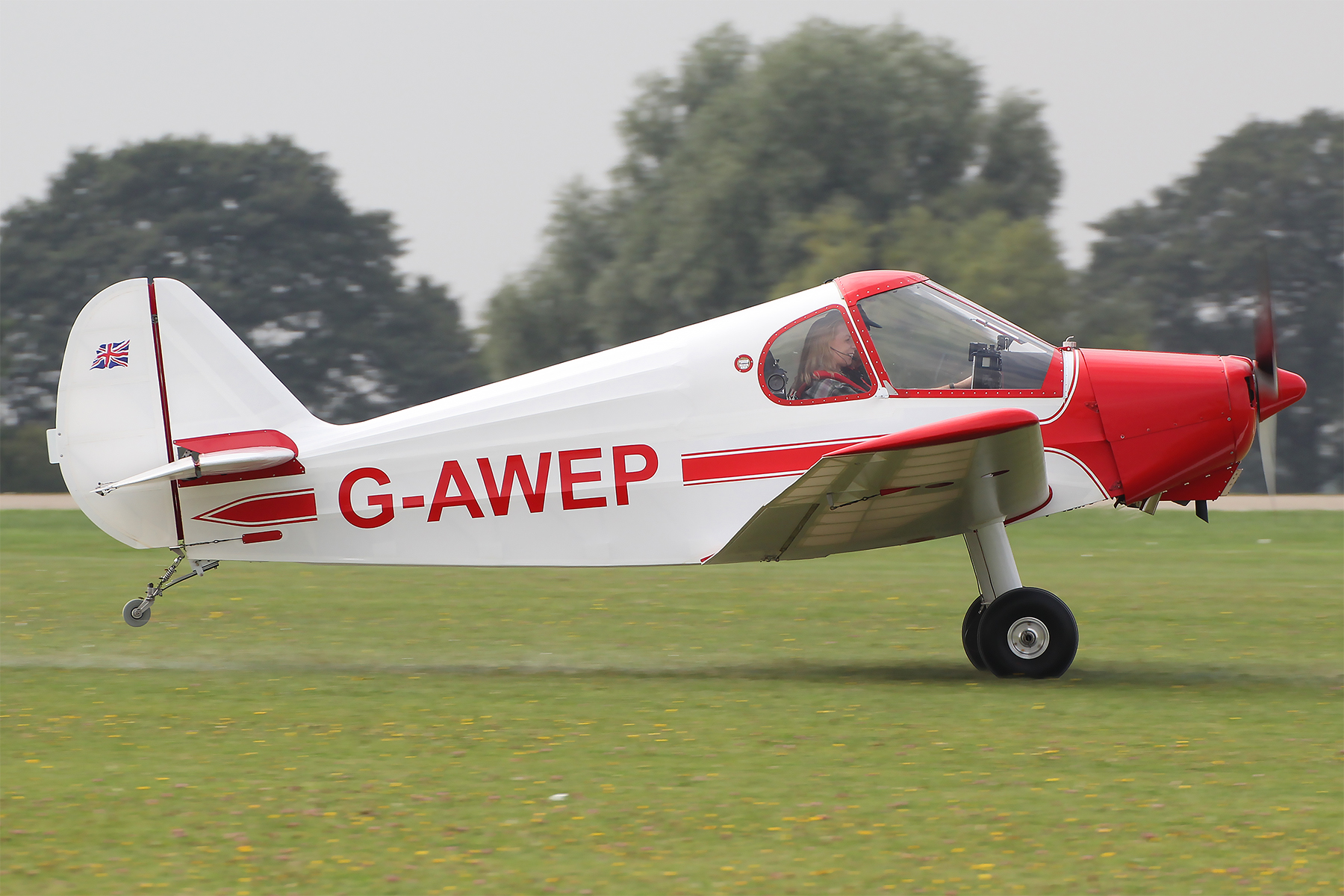
Minicab G-AWEP in 2021

Roland Beamont was the chief test pilot and manager of flight operations for EE. He lived near Samlesbury Hall on the southern edge of the airfield, and gave himself permission to commute regularly between Samlesbury and Warton in his Gardan GY20 Minicab registered G-AWEP.. This aircraft had been built at Samlesbury by Stan Jackson, a BAC works superintendent.

In 1961, Beamont allowed the Blackpool and Fylde Gliding Club to relocate from Blackpool to Samlesbury. All of the club's activities had moved there by 1966. EE never charged them, and allowed use of hangars on Friday and Saturday nights to store gliders for their weekend flying. BAC even designed a new hangar for them, but it was not built because the club moved to its newly acquired airfield at Chipping in April 1973. The club later changed its name to the Bowland Forest Gliding Club.

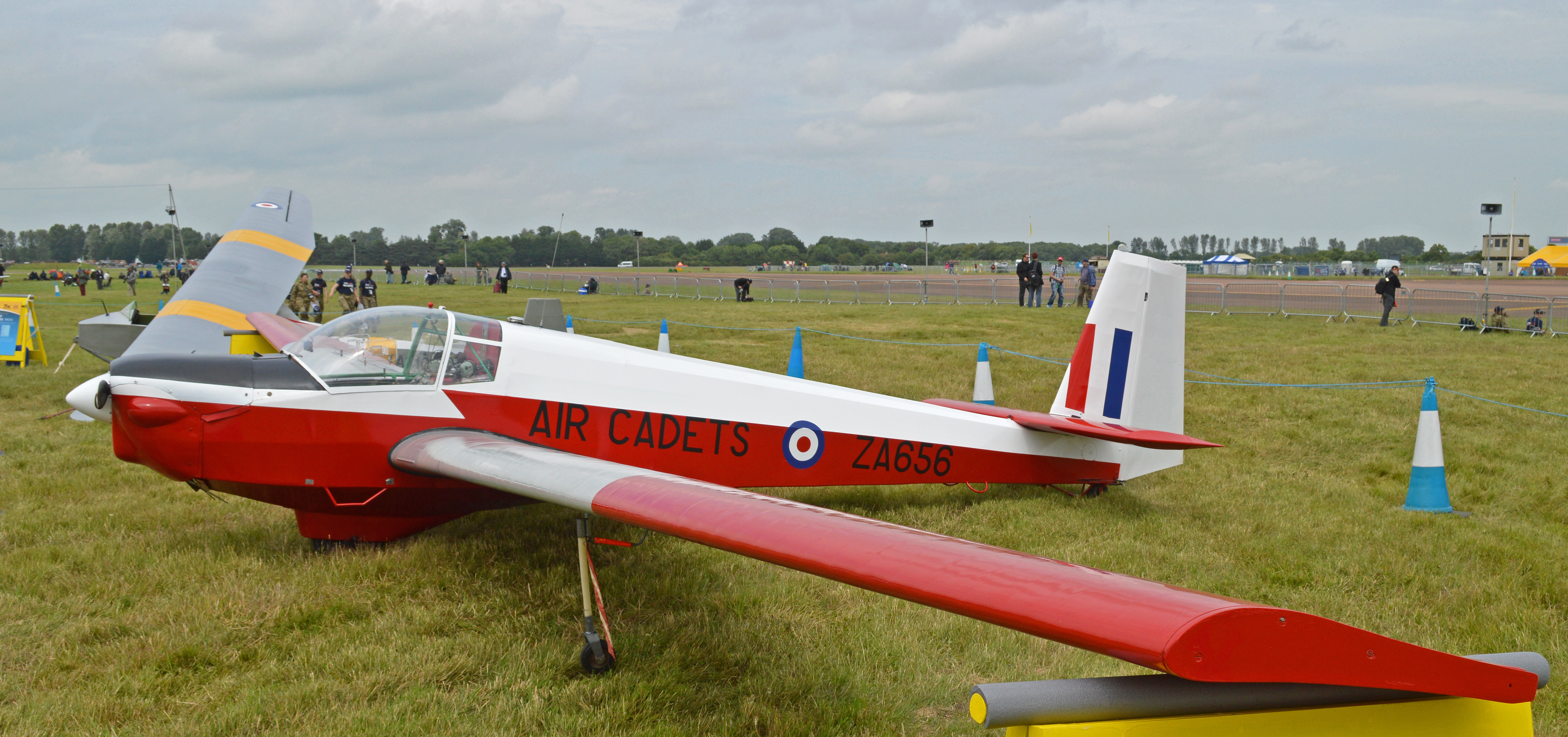
RAF Slingsby T.61 Venture T2 ZA656 (G-BTWC)

The gliding club was replaced in June 1984 when RAF 635 Volunteer Gliding Squadron (VGS) moved in from RAF Burtonwood. They operated Slingsby Venture T2 and Grob Vigilant T1 motor gliders.

By 2009, all BAE flying activity had moved to the longer runway at Warton, and 635 VGS decamped to RAF Topcliffe, marking the end of flying at the site. The aerodrome's ICAO code of EGNG was reassigned to Bagby airfield in Yorkshire.

== BAE Systems use ==
Today the Samlesbury facility is a high-technology BAE Systems manufacturing and aerospace facility. Spirit AeroSystems also occupies a small area of Samlesbury after the BAE Systems Aerostructures business was sold to Spirit AeroSystems in 2006. Spirit manufactures parts for the Airbus and other civil platforms at the site.

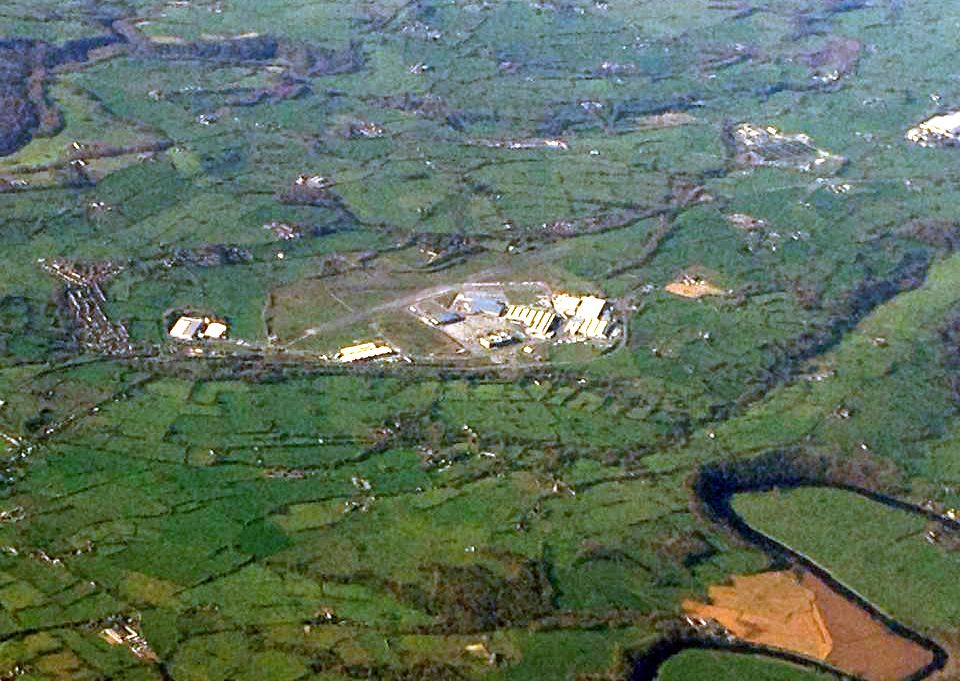
Aerial picture, April 2014

During 2006, BAE Systems transferred ownership of the site to its Pension Fund Scheme. There are now ongoing plans to develop a high-tech aerospace business park on the airfield. Phase One of the building works began in November 2007, projected to take a year to complete. In 2008, work began on the construction of a new main entrance and visitor's centre at the western boundary of the site; this is now in operation.

The current site, which employs over 3,000 people, builds the fuselage and other parts for the Eurofighter Typhoon and other aircraft including the Lockheed Martin F-35 Lightning II and the McDonnell Douglas T-45 Goshawk. The site has also seen the construction of a large block to house BAE office staff. BAE's Academy for Skills & Knowledge (ASK) training building now occupies the eastern end of the main runway.

In April 2015, after closure of the remaining airfield runway, a solar farm consisting of 9,000 solar panels was installed at its western end. By 2016, it had prevented over a million kilogrammes (2,200,000 lb) of carbon being released into the atmosphere, and had saved £300,000 in energy costs.

=== Gate guards ===
The site used to have two real aircraft as gate guards adjacent to the old site entrance. One was a Lightning F.53 (ZF580), removed in February 2013. The Lightning was painted in generic RAF aircraft markings as worn after return from the Royal Saudi Air Force (RSAF) where it bore serial 53-672. This was returned to the United Kingdom around 1986 (with 2,305 flying hours) when British Aerospace sold Tornado aircraft to the RSAF as part of the Al Yamamah deal. The removal of the Lightning was met with "local anger".

Until November 2009 there was also a Canberra PR.7 (WT537) as a gate guard but this was removed for restoration at the (now closed) RAF Millom Aviation and Military Museum at Haverigg, Cumbria. A full-size plastic F-35 Lightning II and a plastic English Electric Lightning (created using a mould from the original plane) were installed as the site's gate guard in the summer of 2015.

== Enterprise zone ==
Since February 2012, the aerodrome has provided one of the two sites of Lancashire Enterprise Zone, the other being BAE Systems' Warton Aerodrome. The zone's site at Samlesbury covers 74 hectares (180 acres). BAE Systems, Lancashire County Council and Lancashire Enterprise Partnership coordinate the site's development.

Several new roads on the site have been named after significant people in British aviation, including Roy Chadwick Way, Sir Frederick Page Way and Petter Court.

== National Cyber Force ==
In 2021 it was announced that the headquarters of the UK's National Cyber Force would be based at the Aerodrome. It was expected that by 2023 a force of 3,000 people would be working at the site.

== Accidents and incidents ==
- On 3 November 1947 Vampire F.3 VP732 suffered engine failure on takeoff and crashed during the forced landing onto farmland, hitting a dried-up pond and narrowly avoiding trees. The EE test pilot, Johnny W. C. Squier, was unhurt, ending up very close to his house on the edge of the airfield. The aircraft, due to be delivered to the Royal Canadian Air Force as 17043, was written off.
- On 7 May 1950 Slingsby T.7 Kirby Cadet TX.2 VM645 crashed on launch. The aircraft, of RAF 635 Glider School, Air Training Corps, was written off. The pilot, the sole occupant, survived.

== Bibliography ==
- Beamont, Roland (1980). Testing Years. Ian Allan Ltd. ISBN 0711010722.
- Emslie, Keith; Clarke, Keith (2019). "Blackpool & Fiddlers" (PDF). Bowland Forest Gliding Club. Archived from the original (PDF) on 31 January 2023.
- Ferguson, Aldon P. (2004). Lancashire Airfields in the Second World War. Newbury, UK: Countryside Books. ISBN 1-85306-873-X.
- Longworth, James H. (2012). Test Flying in Lancashire from Samlesbury and Warton Aerodromes Volume 1: WW1 to the 1960s. Preston, Lancashire: BAE Systems. ISBN 978-0-9573755-0-5.
- Longworth, James H. (2013). Test Flying in Lancashire from Samlesbury and Warton Aerodromes Volume 2: From the 1960s into the 1980s. Preston, Lancashire: BAE Systems. ISBN 978-0-9573755-1-2.
