= Bowland Forest Gliding Club =

Gliding club in England

Bowland Forest Gliding Club Ltd
- Abbreviation: BFGC
- Established: 1930
- Founder: William T. Aked
- Headquarters: Chipping Airfield
- Key people: John Scholes 'Jack' Aked
- Website: www.bfgc.co.uk
- Formerly called: Blackpool & Fylde Gliding Club

Chipping Airfield
- IATA: none; ICAO: GB-0339

Summary
- Owner/Operator: Bowland Forest Gliding Club Ltd
- Serves: Lancashire
- Opened: 1972
- Elevation AMSL: 587 ft / 179 m
- Coordinates: 53°53′6″N 2°37′15″W
- Website: www.bfgc.co.uk

Map
- Interactive map of Chipping Airfield

Runways
Direction	Length		Surface
Direction	ft	m	Surface
12/30	2,820	860	Grass
07	1,070	325	Grass
- Lengths from Google Earth

Bowland Forest Gliding Club (BFGC) is a British gliding club near the village of Chipping, Lancashire. It was formed as the Blackpool and Fylde Gliding Club in 1930, and is a members-only club, with no paid employees. It owns its airfield, generally called Chipping Airfield, but also known as Bowland Forest, Fiddlers Lane or Lower Cock Hill Farm.

== History ==
=== Blackpool ===
==== Phase 1 ====
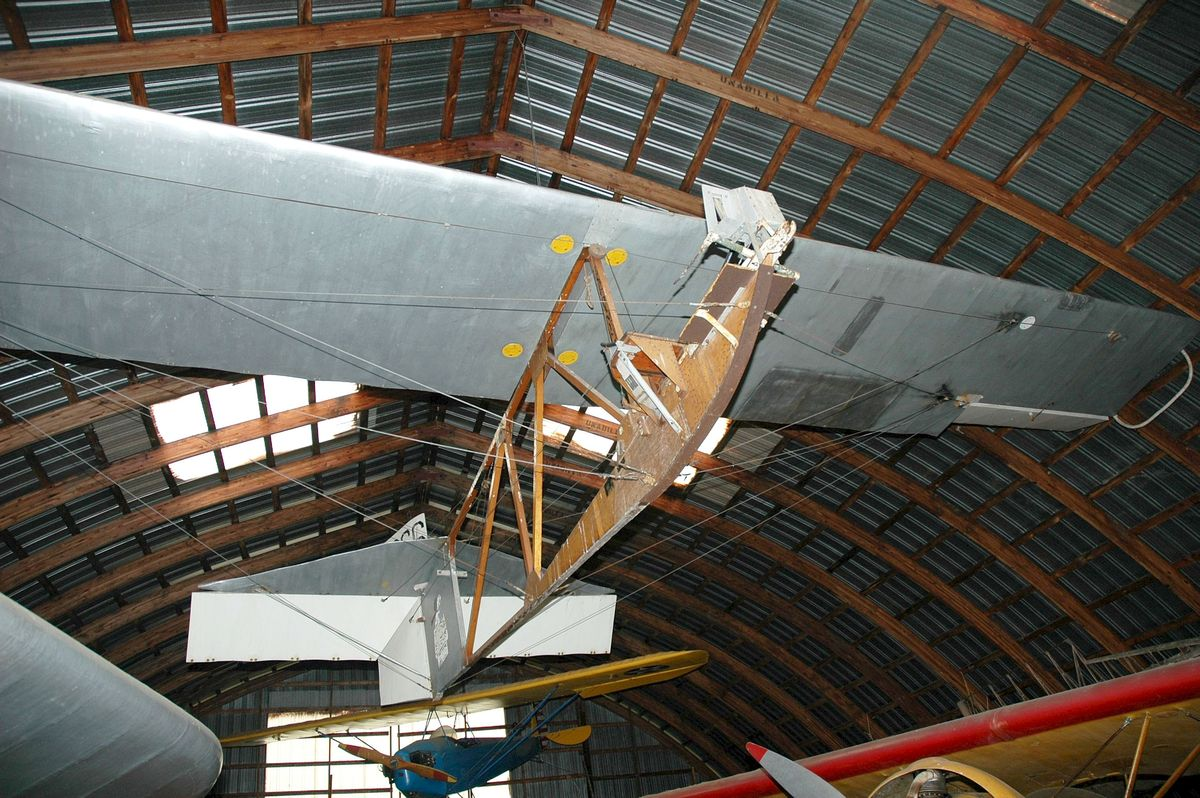
Cloudcraft Dickson Primary replica N5666

The Blackpool and Fylde Gliding Club (BFGC) was instigated by a car dealer, William T. Aked, in 1930. At an initial meeting, 40 people paid the first subscription of one guinea (£1.05). Its first aircraft was a Cloudcraft Dickson Primary, bought from the manufacturer for £35. It was delivered in May 1931 and made its first flights in a field lent to them at Thornton-Cleveleys on 9 and 10 May.

Recorded activities were sparse. Many other gliding clubs were formed around that time, and locally there were clubs at Preston, Barrow in Furness, Manchester, Bolton, Accrington, Rochdale, Kendal and Windermere. With the onset of the Great Depression, gliding club fees were seen as an unnecessary cost, and most of these clubs were soon wound up, including the BFGC in 1932.

==== Phase 2 ====
During the Second World War William Aked's son, Jack, commanded Air Training Corps (ATC) glider training courses at No.181 Gliding School, first at Blackpool's Stanley Park Aerodrome, and later at Warton Aerodrome, from 1942 to 48.

After the war gliding clubs were being formed again, and with the support of local ATC staff, Jack registered the Blackpool and Fylde Gliding Club with himself as proprietor, licensee and chief flying instructor. He leased a building at Blackpool (Squires Gate) Airport and turned it into a social club named The Kite. This was very popular with the social members who wanted to avoid the hordes of holiday-makers, and produced a profit with which to pay for the gliding activities.

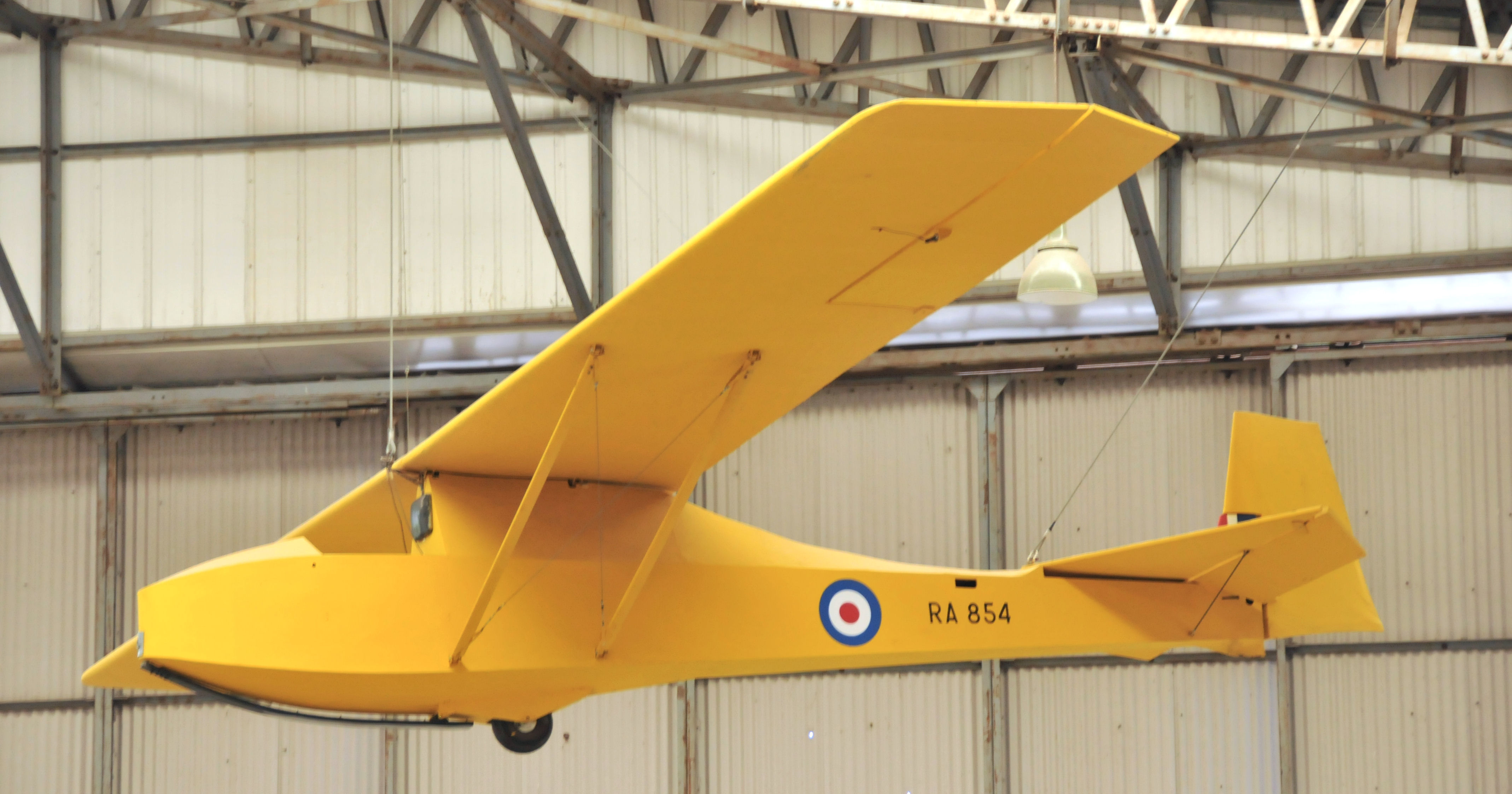
A Slingsby T.7 Cadet

An old Hawkridge Dagling glider was acquired in 1951, registered BGA 493, suitable only for being dragged along the ground by a car while the student pilot practised keeping the wings level. In 1952 a Martin Hearn-built Slingsby T.7 Cadet, BGA 496, was purchased, and limited hops along the runway could be made. A Wild barrage balloon launching winch, along with a Standard Beaverette as its tow truck, were bought in 1953 so that tow cables could be released in flight and circuits flown, lasting from 2½ to 7 minutes.

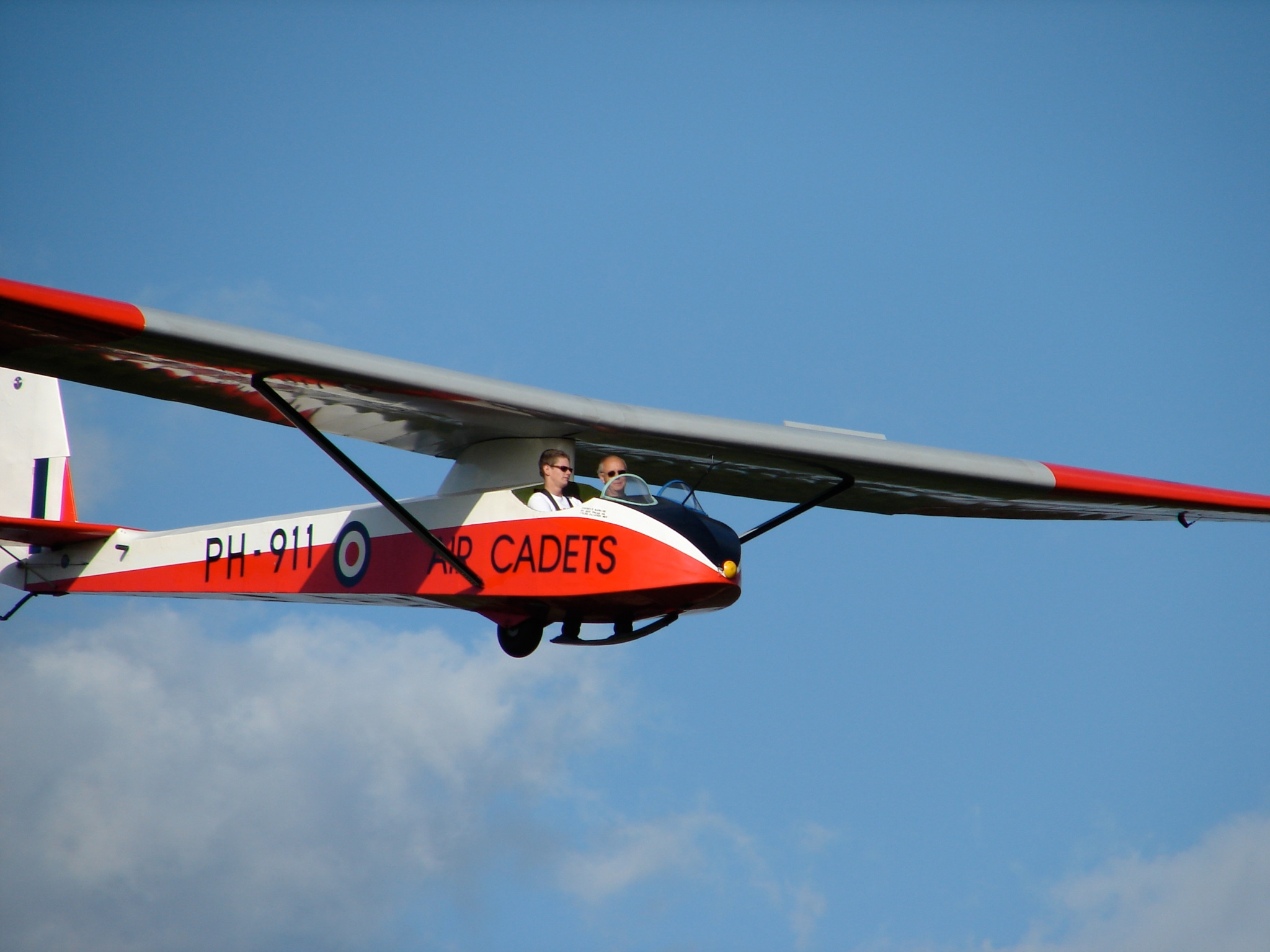
A Slingsby T.21B

By now a two-seat trainer was needed so that proper training could be undertaken, and in 1954 Slingsby T.21B BGA 711 was bought. Soaring (climbing in rising air after cable release) was a rare possibility at Blackpool, but occasional thermals did occur. particularly over the town, in summer. In the mid to late 1950s the airport became busier and falling launch wires were a serious hazard. Increasing numbers of lights, signs and equipment on poles appeared, and it was time to look for a new airfield.

=== Samlesbury ===
Looking for a new location, Jack Aked's dealership for Land Rover brought him into contact with many local farmers, and he heard of land on a hillside at Nicky Nook, 1 mile (1.6 km) east of the village of Scorton on the edge of the Trough of Bowland. 84 flights were made there between August 1958 and May 1960, some of them in the EoN Baby BGA 629 which had been operated by the club since 1956, but the location was too gusty, steep, and obstructed by trees and boulders, so the site was abandoned.

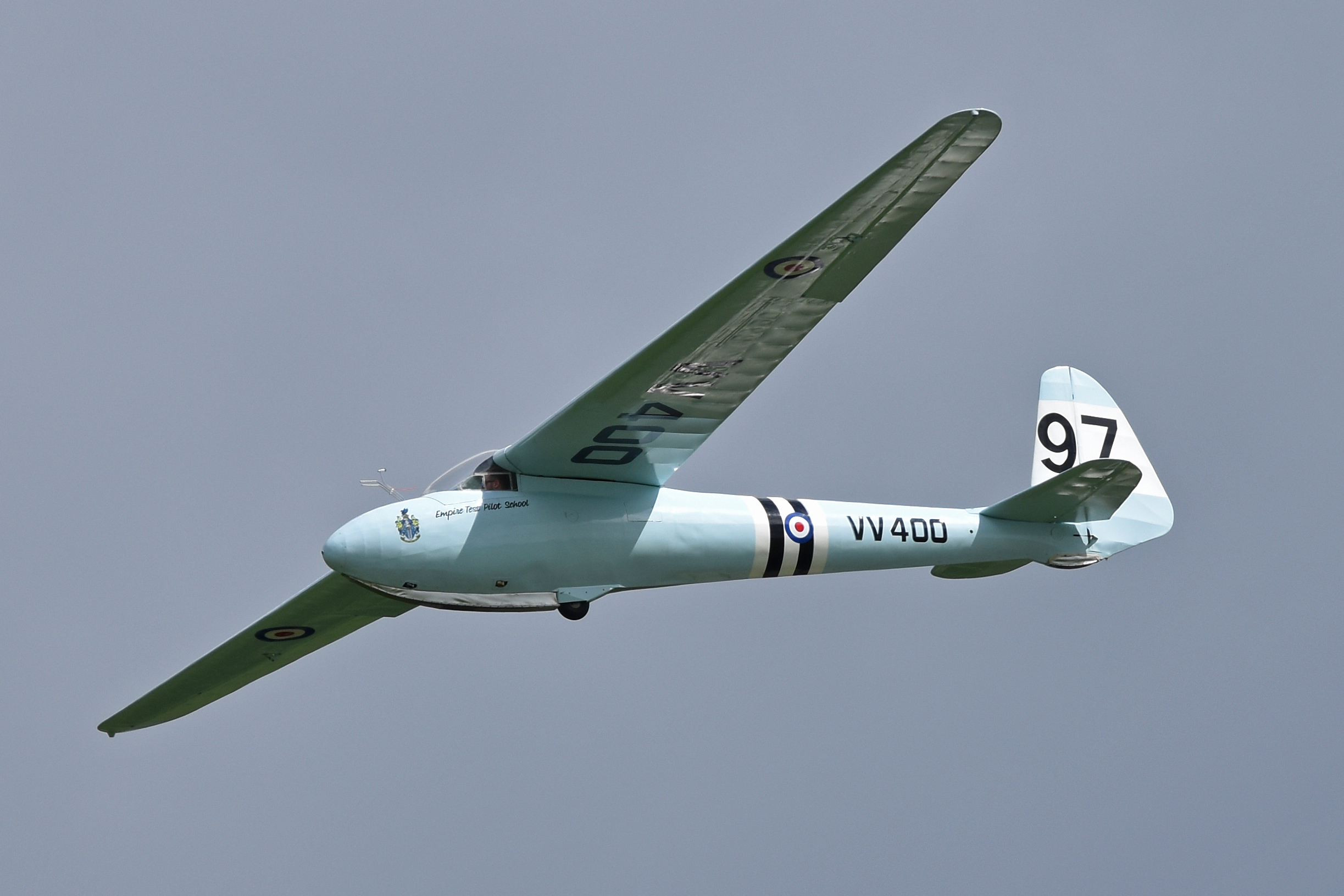
An Elliott EoN Olympia 2b

In 1961 EoN Olympia 2B BGA 1056 was bought with financial assistance from Herbert J. Liver, their then president, providing a step-up in performance, and the Cadet was sold. The club's chairman worked at BAC Warton, and knew Roland Beamont, their chief test pilot and manager of flight operations at their two airfields, Warton and Samlesbury. Being enthusiastic about all forms of flying, Beamont readily gave permission to use Samlesbury Aerodrome as their base, completely without charge. They had to use the runways, which were composed of tarmac with granite chips to give maximum braking for any Canberras and Lightnings aborting take-off, and which caused severe wear to glider tow cables, especially the preferred stranded type, so piano wire had to be used. Operations at Samlesbury started in May 1961 and the move from Squires Gate was completed by January 1966.

Relations with BAC staff were cordial, and the club was regularly permitted to use their hangars, thus reducing the chore of rigging and de-rigging the gliders every day for trailer storage. The site gave the opportunity for much more soaring, both thermal and ridge, than Blackpool, and average flight times grew significantly. During this period a Bréguet Fauvette single seater, a Blanik tandem two-seater, and a Slingsby T45 Swallow single-seater were acquired – some of the finance still coming from The Kite club at Squires Gate.

The club bought an old fuel bowser as scrap from BAC and its Bedford chassis was used as the basis for a new winch which was built by the members. It lasted until it was replaced in 1995.

The idea of building a hangar for the BFGC at Samlesbury was discussed, and BAC even drew up a plan, but the members wanted a flying field of their own, preferably nearer the hills of Bowland Forest.

=== Chipping ===
In 1967 the club discovered that the owner of Lower Cock Hill Farm, Fiddlers Lane, Chipping, was retiring and considering selling his 57 acres, including the farmhouse and barn. The site was at the edge of Bowland Forest, immediately below Parlick Fell and within easy gliding reach of further fells, making good ridge soaring possible with winds from nearly all directions, including the prevailing south westerlies. By exchanging land with a neighbouring farm, several fields could be combined to create a good sized airfield. Trial flights were made from the existing fields, extending into 1968, and proved a great success.

In preparation for acquiring their own site, in July 1969 the club members formed a limited company without shares: the Blackpool & Fylde Gliding Club Ltd, and this removed the influence of Jack Aked, who was less than enthusiastic about the acquisition plan. The process of receiving planning permission and grant applications took some time (the UK government granted them £7,075) but the sale was completed in 1971.

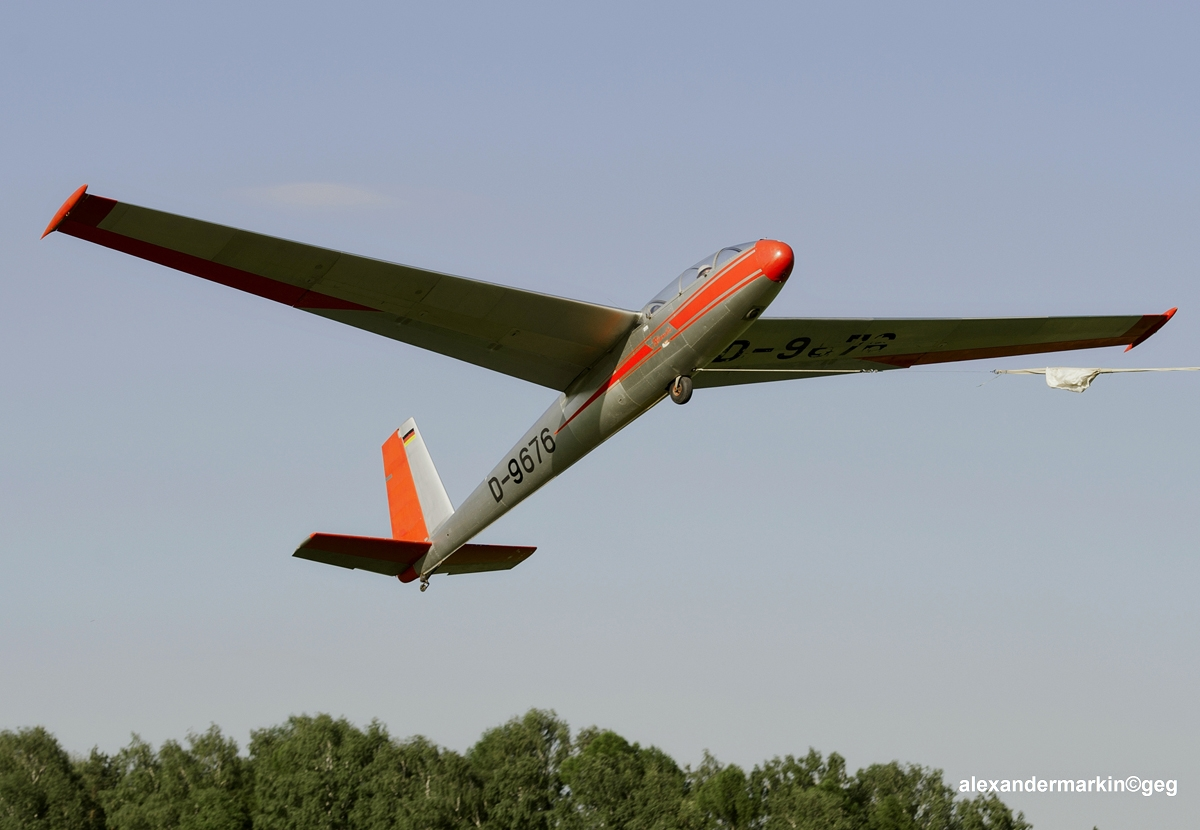
A Blanik L-13 during a winch launch

While flying continued at Samlesbury, the club members started a phase of hard work at Chipping, using outside contractors as little as possible. The main task was installing land drainage, but other work included demolishing walls and hedges, building and installing a cattle grid, fencing the site, erecting a hangar, converting the barn into a clubhouse and creating a sheltered parking area for glider trailers. Members' efforts were rewarded, with a day's work earning a day's free flying. Flying from the new airfield started in August 1972 with the Fauvette and Blanik. The rest of the fleet followed in August 1973, and the work was largely completed by the end of the year so that a full flying and social programme could begin. They were the sixth British gliding club to own their site.

The long-serving T.21, BGA 711, was crashed at Chipping by a visiting instructor who flew it into a nearby fell in 1974. It was replaced by another T.21, BGA 948. The wreck of 711 was bought by a club syndicate who painstakingly rebuilt it. It flew again in November 1984 and won the Vintage Gliding Club rebuild of the year award. It had a landing accident in 2000 and was repaired, and has since been sold to Canada. The EoN Baby BGA 629 was registered with the Vintage Glider Club in 1975.

Jack Aked died in February 1979. In the 1970s he had been made an honorary life member of the club and was invited to become its president. He also received a British Gliding Association diploma "in honour of his long services to club gliding".

Fleet in 1987

- Schleicher ASK 13 (two-seater) x2
- Slingsby Type 45 Swallow (single-seater)
- EoN Olympia 2b (single-seater)
- Pilatus B-4 (single-seater)

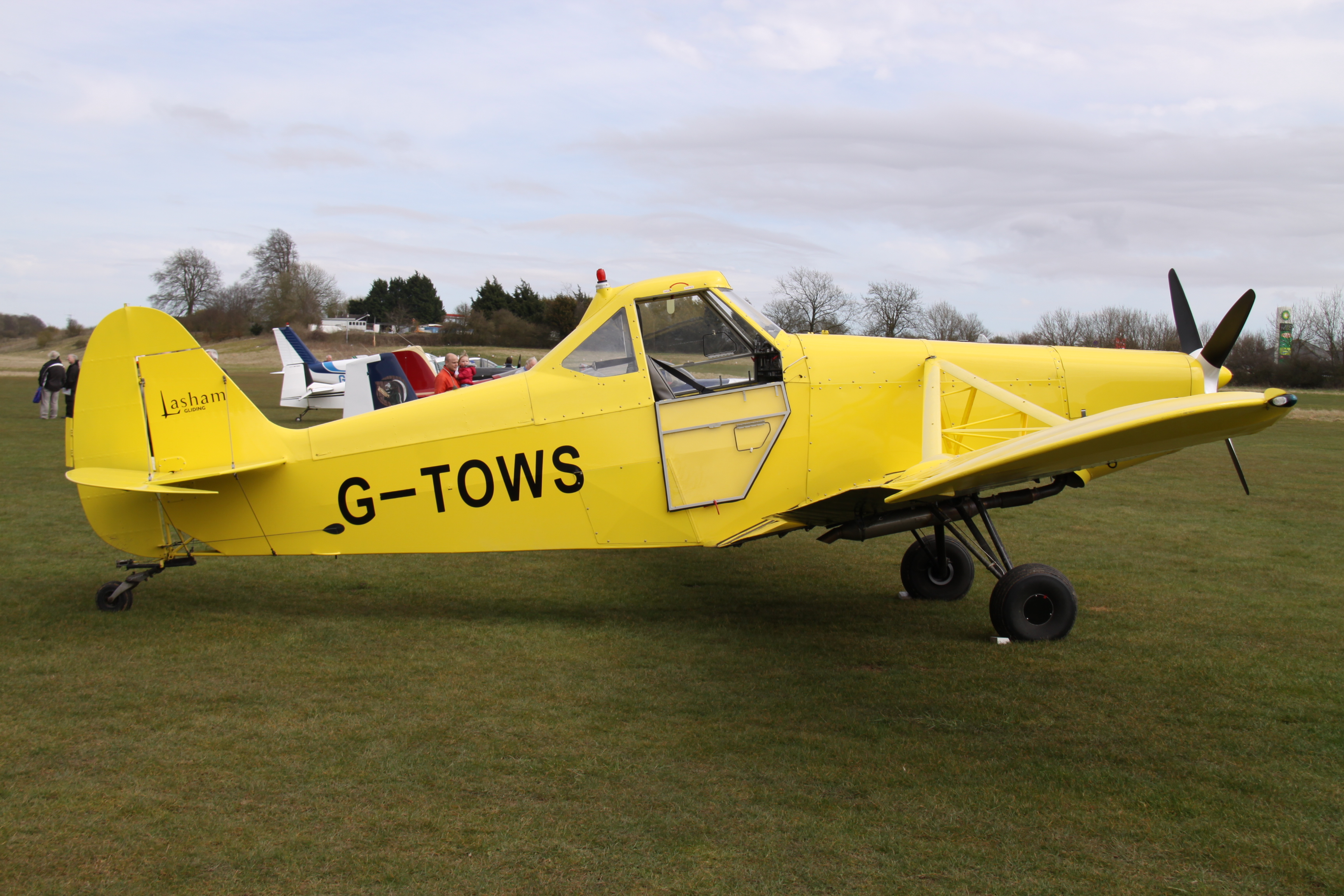
G-TOWS after it had been sold by BFGC

While the club's planning permission restricted activity to winch launches, the club hoped to be able to do aerotows, allowing much higher releases and thus the possibility of longer range flights and better chances of wave soaring. Worried about neighbours' reaction to motorised aircraft, the club first applied for permission for motor gliders which would allow visiting aircraft access. This was granted and some operations did take place, with acceptance from the neighbours. The club then applied to operate a single tug aircraft and, after a couple of demonstration flights, this was approved. In 1991 the aircraft, a Piper Pawnee with a special silencer, was acquired with a Sports Council grant covering half the cost, and the members clubbed together to raise the necessary £200 to give it the special registration G-TOWS. In six months in 1992 the aircraft performed 312 aerotow launches. Unfortunately local opposition was aroused and after a long wrangle, including a court case, powered aircraft were banned again and the Pawnee was sold in June 1994.

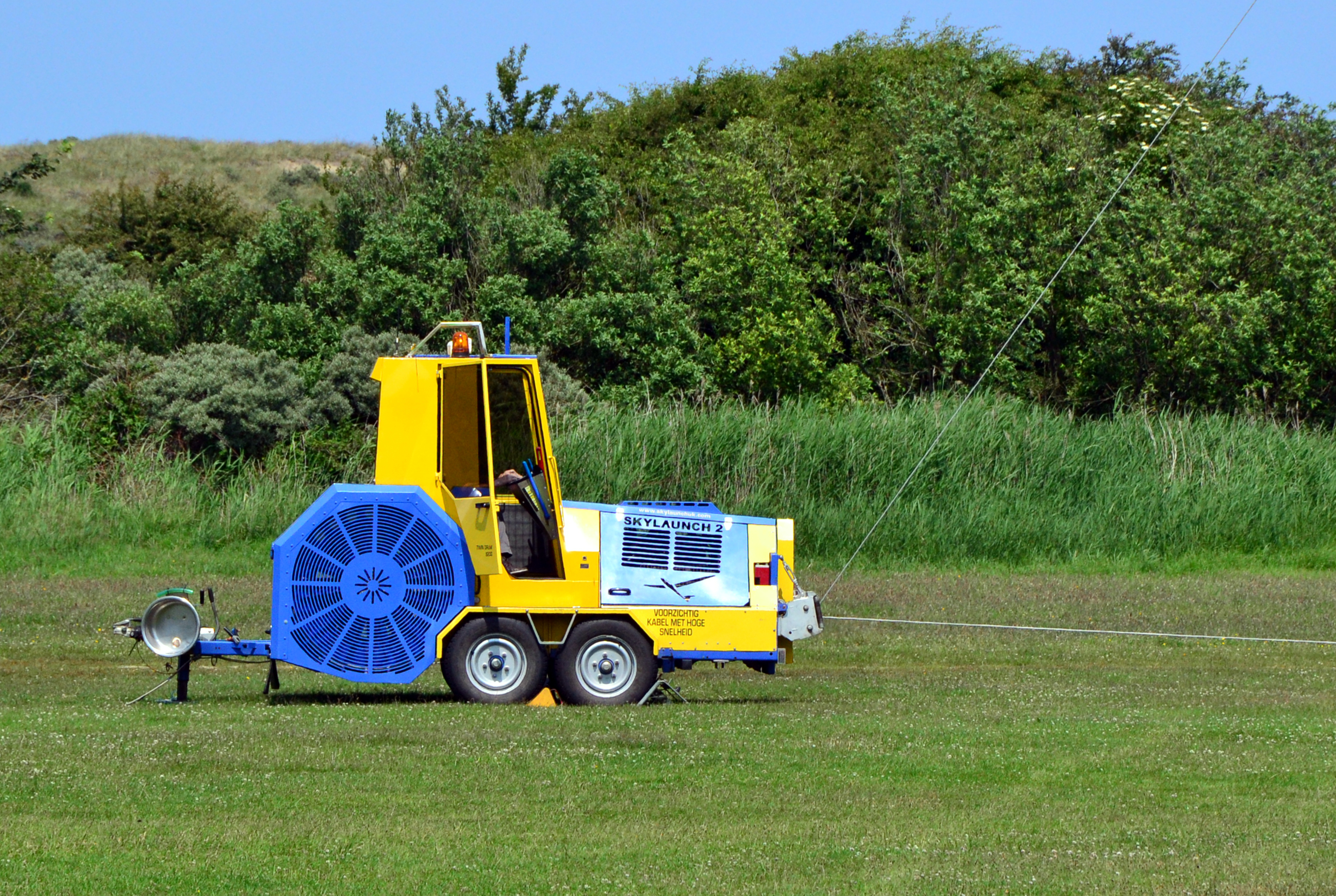
A Skylaunch 2 glider winch

The club used the money raised from the sale of the Pawnee to buy an LPG-powered Skylaunch 2 winch with twin drums. It arrived in January 1995, enabling a faster launch rate and greater launch heights.

In 1993 the club changed its name to Bowland Forest Gliding Club, but didn't need to change its initialism. This was done partly to help re-establish good relations with the club's neighbours.

== Current operations ==
As of 2024 the club is very active. Flying takes place on Wednesdays, Fridays, Saturdays and Sundays. During non-flying times, cattle often graze the land. The club has seven gliders, including five two-seaters, but many more gliders are based here, owned by individuals or syndicates, mainly stored in trailers. All flights are winch launched. In 2017 there were around 120 flying members and 40 social members.

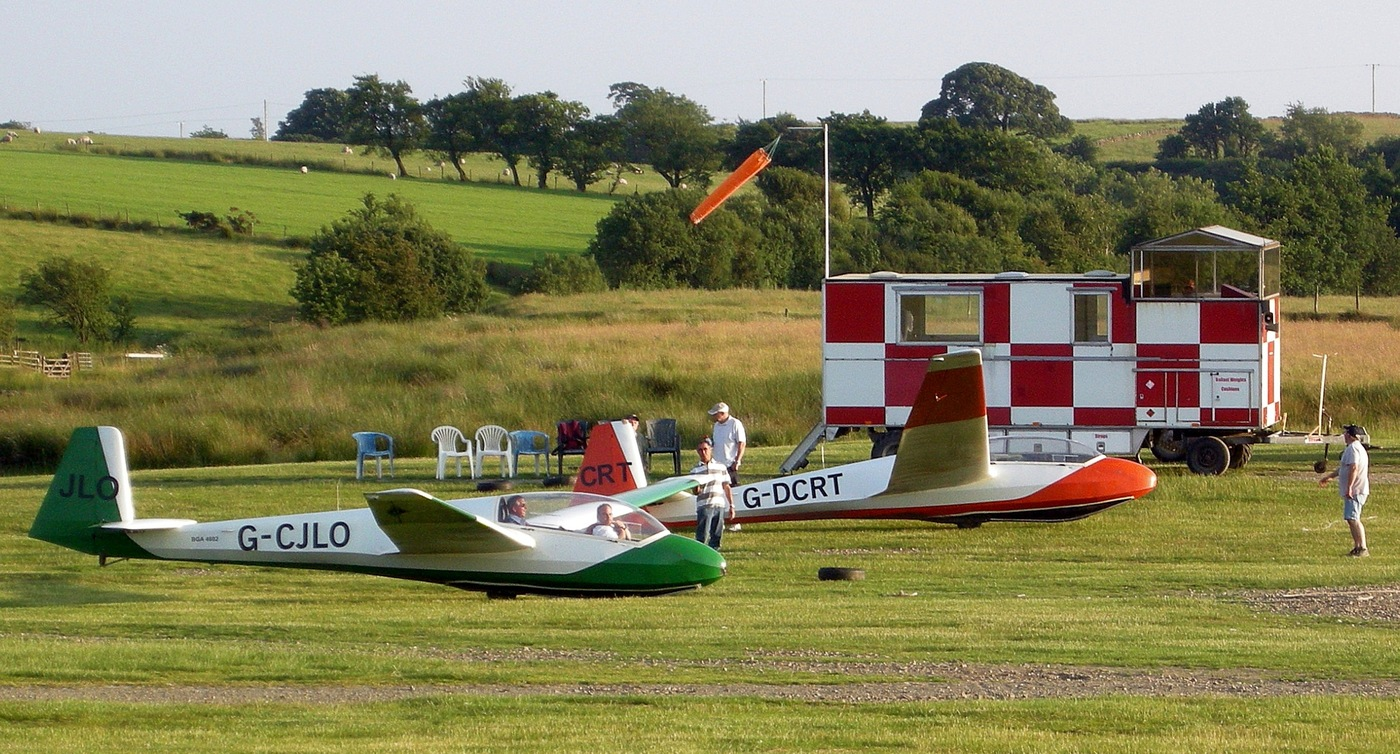
Two club ASK 13 trainers in front of the DP Van at Chipping

The red-and-white check control van, officially the Despatch Point or DP Van, is built on the chassis of the old Wild winch that was bought at Blackpool in the 1950s.

Gliding tuition is free. The club earns fees for launches, a flying rate per minute, and simulated cable breaks (the club handbook notes that "real cable breaks are free"). There are joining and membership fees, and fees for glider trailer parking. Income is also earned from trial lessons for individuals and groups, usually by appointment on Tuesday or Thursday evenings. The farmhouse is rented to residents.

Several awards are presented, including the Aked Height Trophy for the highest altitude achieved on a flight from Chipping, the Barbara Aked Trophy for Progress in Early Solo, and the Cross-Country Trophy. There are also several competitions held throughout the year.

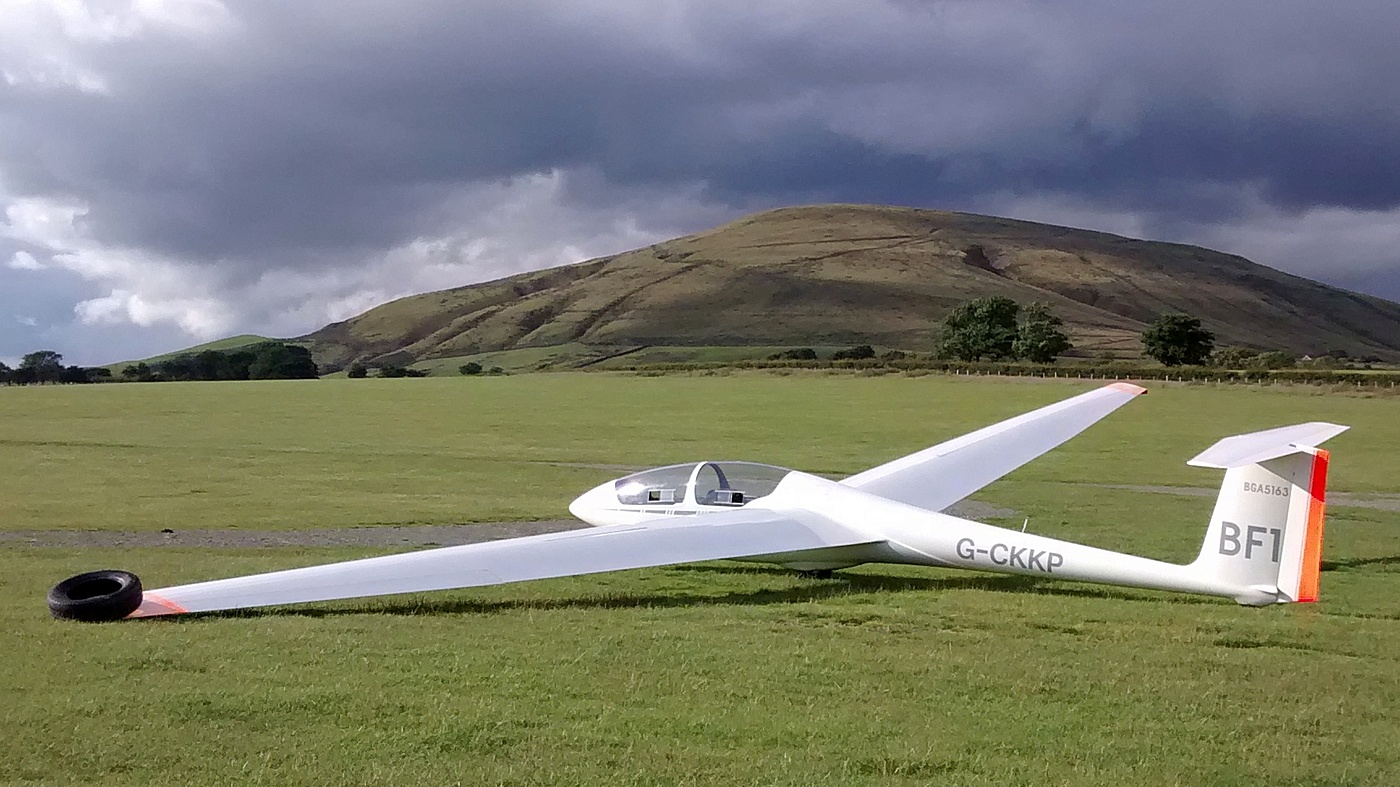
The club's Schleicher ASK 21 G-CKKP with Parlick Fell behind

Since the club moved to Chipping, hang gliding and paragliding have become common activities, and Parlick Fell has become a popular location for them, as well as for radio-controlled model aircraft. They usually keep lower than the gliders, and to stay closer to the hill. There has only been one collision, with a radio controlled aircraft, and their presence is of no great concern. The airfield was used as a base and campsite for paragliding contests held at Parlick in 2017, 2018, 2019 and 2022. Birds of prey are also common, as are seagulls, and they help to identify good thermals. Gliders try not to fly over the local grouse moor to avoid the birds fleeing their nests.

=== Fleet ===
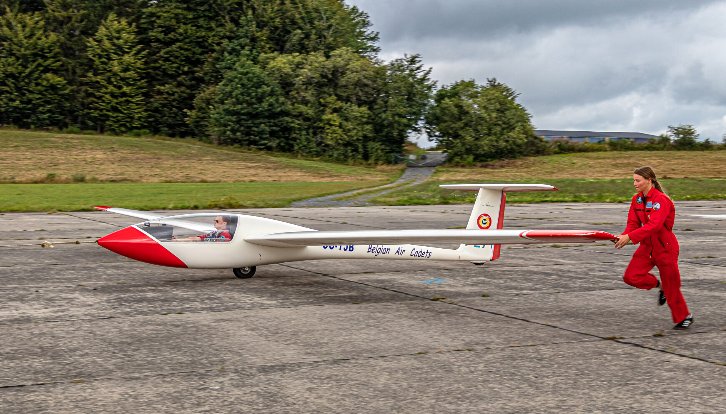
A Grob G102 Astir CS Jeans

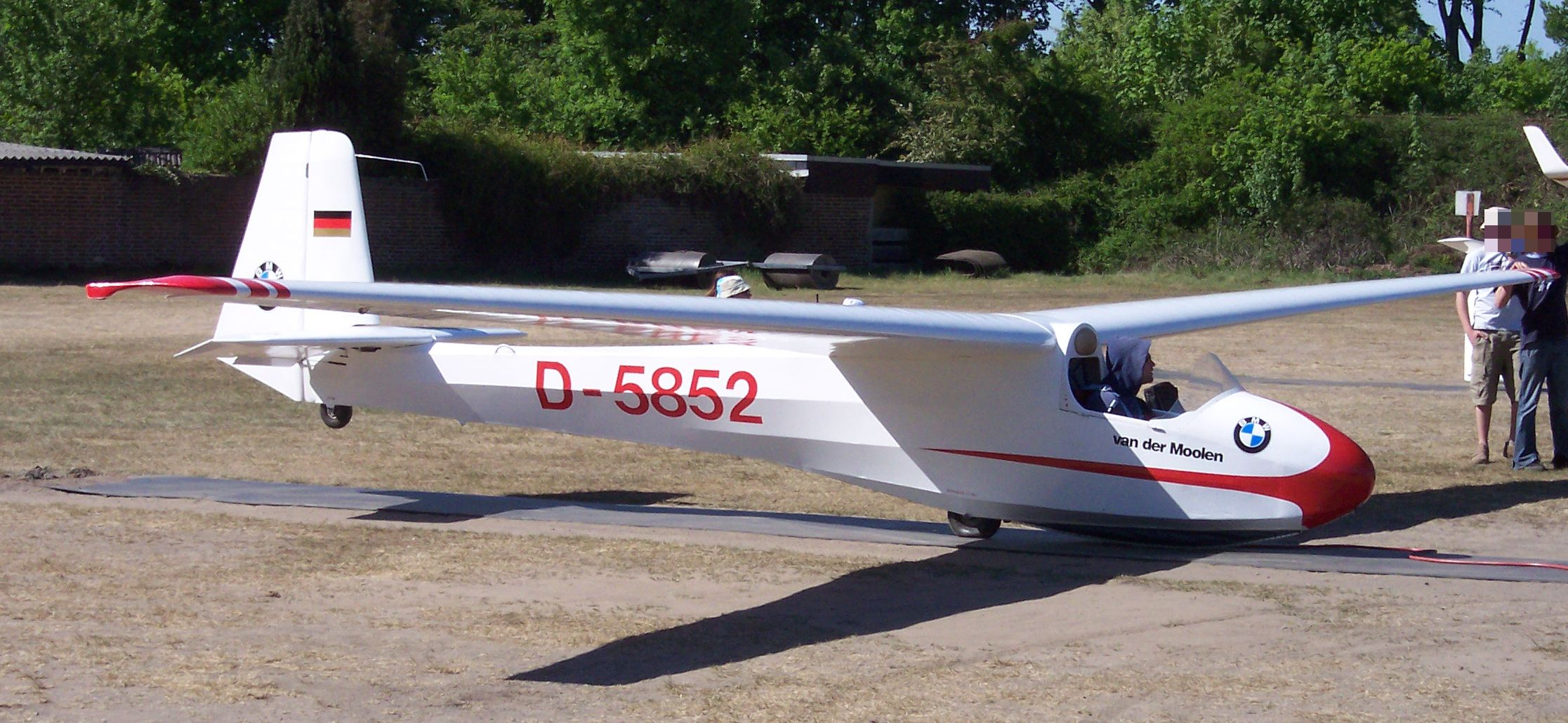
A Schleicher K 8B

Aircraft registered to BFGC as of June 2026

Type	Seats	CAA reg	BGA reg	Acquired
Grob G102 Astir CS Jeans	1	G-DELN	2772	27 October 2008
Schleicher ASK 13	2	G-CHXP	4289	11 November 2022
Schleicher ASK 13	2	G-CJLO	4602	20 September 2007
Schleicher ASK 13	2	G-CJZE	4906	11 November 2015
Schleicher ASK 21	2	G-CKKP	5163	30 June 2006
Schleicher ASK 21	2	G-DHRR	4146	23 June 2023
Schleicher K 8B	1	G-DEPT	2849	8 October 2024
Schleicher K 8B	1	G-EETH	2935	18 April 2012

== Accidents and incidents ==
=== Accidents and incidents involving BFGC aircraft ===
- In 1974 Slingsby T.21B BGA 711 crashed into Fairsnape, a fell near Chipping airfield, while being flown by a visiting instructor. He survived, but the aircraft was badly damaged. It was stored in the club barn, and later restored to flying condition. See text above and further incident below.
- Around 1992 Piper PA-25 Pawnee G-TOWS, returning to the airfield after a glider tow, hit a descending winch cable. The aircraft was damaged and the pilot received whiplash injuries, but both survived and returned to service.
- On 4 September 1999 Schempp-Hirth Cirrus BGA 1835 was written off when it undershot into a fence during landing at Chipping. The pilot survived.
- On 12 August 2000 Slingsby T.21B BGA 711 crashed during landing at Chipping. The two occupants survived, but the aircraft suffered damage. It was repaired and sold to Canada as C-GAWK.
- On 15 February 2003 Scheibe SF25E Super Falke G-KDFF crashed on take-off at Chipping when the tailwheel of the motor glider snagged a laid-out winch cable. Both occupants, club members Martin Moss and David Rukin, were killed, and the aircraft was destroyed.
- On 21 May 2008 PZL Bielsko SZD-51-1 Junior G-CHHE (ex BGA 3951) was destroyed but the pilot was unhurt. During a normal take-off the aircraft bounced and the cable back-released. The pilot could not locate the airspeed indicator and continued in climb attitude. The aircraft stalled at approximately 40 ft (12 m) above ground level.
- On 20 September 2015 Schleicher ASK 13 G-DCRT BGA 1753 crashed at the airfield during a failed-launch exercise, diving in from a height of 30 ft (9.1 m). The two occupants suffered leg injuries and the glider was written off.

=== Other accidents and incidents at Chipping Airfield ===
- On 6 June 1992 Slingsby T.59D Kestrel 19 BGA 2048 was written off in a crash during take-off from the airfield. The sole occupant survived.

== Bibliography ==
- Emslie, Keith; Clarke, Keith (2019). Blackpool & Fiddlers (PDF).
- Longworth, James H. (2013). Test Flying in Lancashire from Samlesbury and Warton Aerodromes Volume 2: From the 1960s into the 1980s. Preston, Lancashire: BAE Systems. ISBN 978-0-9573755-1-2.
- Myers, Paul (2019). 44 Years and Counting (PDF).
