= Martin Hearn Ltd =

Defunct British aviation engineering company

Martin Hearn Ltd.
- Type: Private
- Industry: Aviation: engineering
- Founded: December 1937; 88 years ago in Cheshire, UK
- Founder: Martin Hearn
- Defunct: 1955
- Fate: Dissolved
- Successor: Aero-Engineering and Marine (Merseyside) Ltd
- Headquarters: England
- Key people: Martin Hearn
- Owner: North Eastern Airways

Martin Hearn Ltd. was a British aviation company which during World War II played a major role in the assembly of thousands of American and Canadian aircraft imported to Liverpool by shipping convoys.

== History ==
=== Formation ===
Martin Nieto Hearn (1st June 1906–June 1992) was a pilot and engineer. He gained his Royal Aero Club Aviator's Certificate (no. 8488) on 20 December 1928 and started his flying career in Avro 504Ks with Berkshire Aviation Tours. He then worked for Northern Air Transport, flying displays with Alan Cobham on his National Aviation Day tours starting in April 1932. Having once stood in for the resident wing-walker, he developed an expertise in aerial trapeze performance, soon becoming in Cobham's words “that most intrepid of wing-walkers”. (Note: The respect was not mutual: Hearn assured Cecil Bebb, his regular wing-walking aircraft pilot, "My real ambition is to have my own engineering company and have Cobham dirty his hands working for me".)

Hearn then decided to adopt a less dangerous occupation, and became involved with Utility Airways at Hooton Aerodrome on the Wirral Peninsula, which had been known as Liverpool’s airport until Speke Airport opened in 1933. Utility Airways had been formed in December 1936 by the owner of Hooton Park (through a company called Merseyside Air Park), William Fettis "Frank" Davison, and his wife Joy Davison, and ran an air taxi service and a 5-minute shuttle between Hooton Park and Speke Airport.

In December 1937 Hearn established his own aviation engineering business, Martin Hearn Ltd. at Hooton Park (as it was generally known), employing up to ten staff maintaining and repairing light aircraft. (Note: One of the employees was E. J. Riding, a noted aviation enthusiast and father of Richard T. Riding, founder of Aeroplane Monthly magazine. E. J. Riding's experiences at Martin Hearn Ltd. are described in Richard's book.)

=== World War II ===
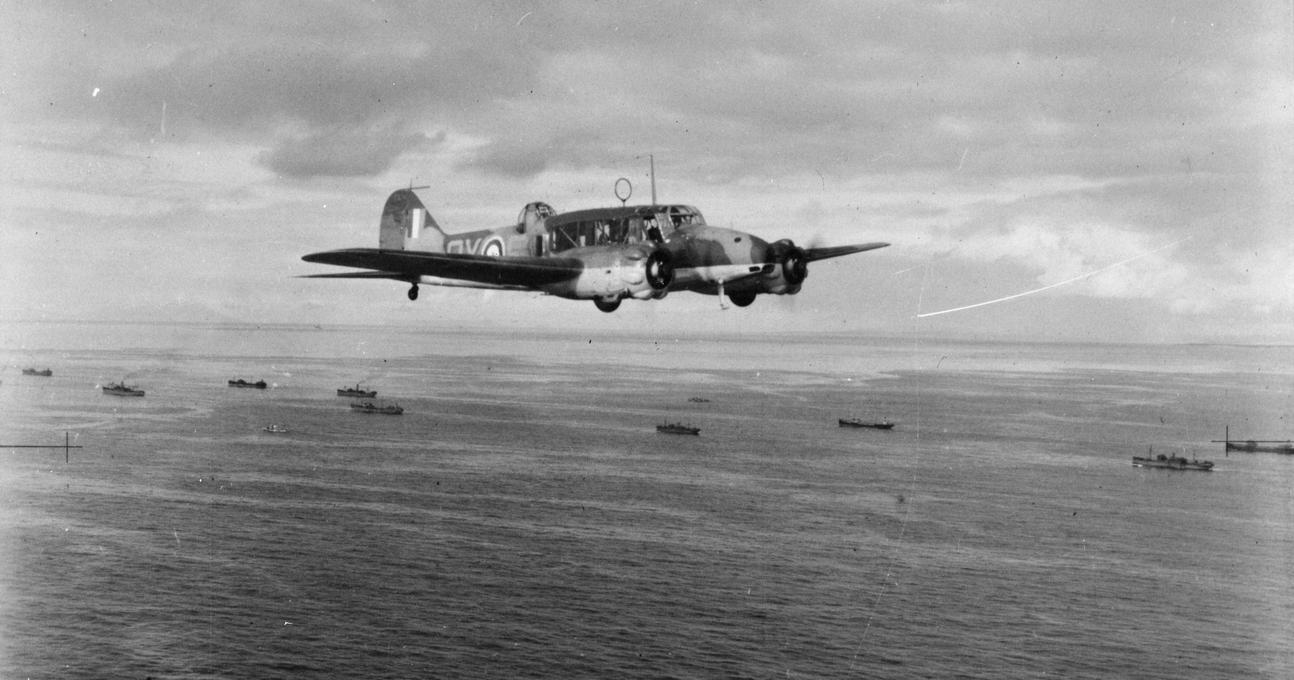
An RAF Coastal Command Avro Anson escorting a convoy.

At the start of World War II in 1939, Hooton Park was taken over by the RAF. At first Avro Ansons were stationed there for anti-submarine patrols, and Blackburn Bothas for radio training, but soon Handley Page Halifaxes and de Havilland Mosquitos were being stored there. Martin Hearn Ltd joined the Civilian Repair Organisation and gained contracts from the Ministry of Aircraft Production for the maintenance, repair and overhaul of all damaged RAF Ansons north of Birmingham, along with Supermarine Spitfires and Mosquitos.

The company also gained the contract to assemble 80 Handley Page Hampden bombers that had been built in Canada by the specially formed Canadian Associated Aircraft consortium and shipped to Liverpool. At this point, Hooton Park airfield was designated No.7 Aircraft Assembly Unit (AAU), and in 1941 Hearn put Major James Cordes in charge of the project. He was an expert on the Hampden, having been Handley Page's chief test pilot during its development.

It was probably around this time that Martin Hearn Ltd became a subsidiary of North Eastern Airways, whose resources may have been useful.

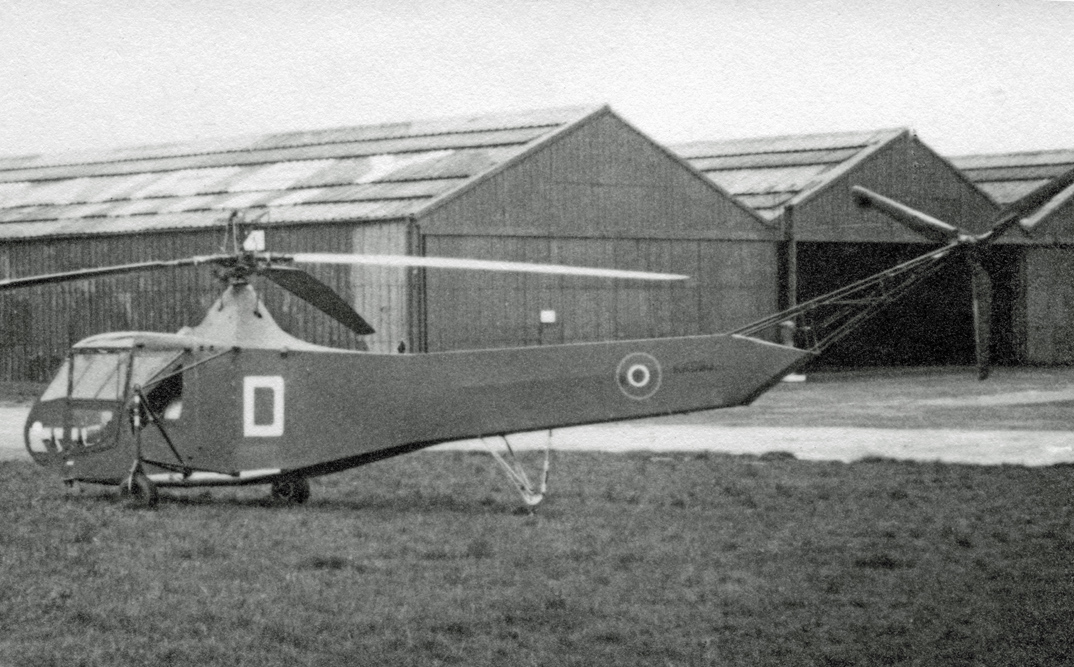
An RAF Sikorsky R-4B Hoverfly, KK990

The AAU went on to assemble around 10,000 American aircraft that were being shipped into Liverpool Docks, including Douglas Bostons, Republic P-47 Thunderbolts, North American Harvards and, in 1944, and some Sikorsky R-4B Hoverfly helicopters. Cordes gained British Helicopter Certificate No 2 in order to test fly them, and made what was probably the first flight in Britain of a production helicopter. Other aircraft assembled included North American P-51 Mustangs, Lockheed P-38 Lightnings, and Douglas Havocs.

While this was going on at Hooton Park, Hearn had also expanded to Hesketh Park Aerodrome, on the coast to the north of Southport where a large new hangar was built alongside two existing WWI hangars previously used by Giro Aviation. Named the No.1 Packed Aircraft Transit Pool, a team of over 200 people assembled Ansons, Spitfires, Mosquitos, Fairey Albacores, Miles Martinets and Waco CG4 Hadrian gliders from their packing crates. These were held in storage at Birkdale and RAF Woodvale until they were assembled at Hesketh Park, flight tested, and then flown to their units from its beach runway. Nearly a thousand aircraft were flight tested here. The unit also received complete aircraft flown in or transported by road for disassembly and packing before being taken to Liverpool Docks for transporting overseas.

=== Demise ===
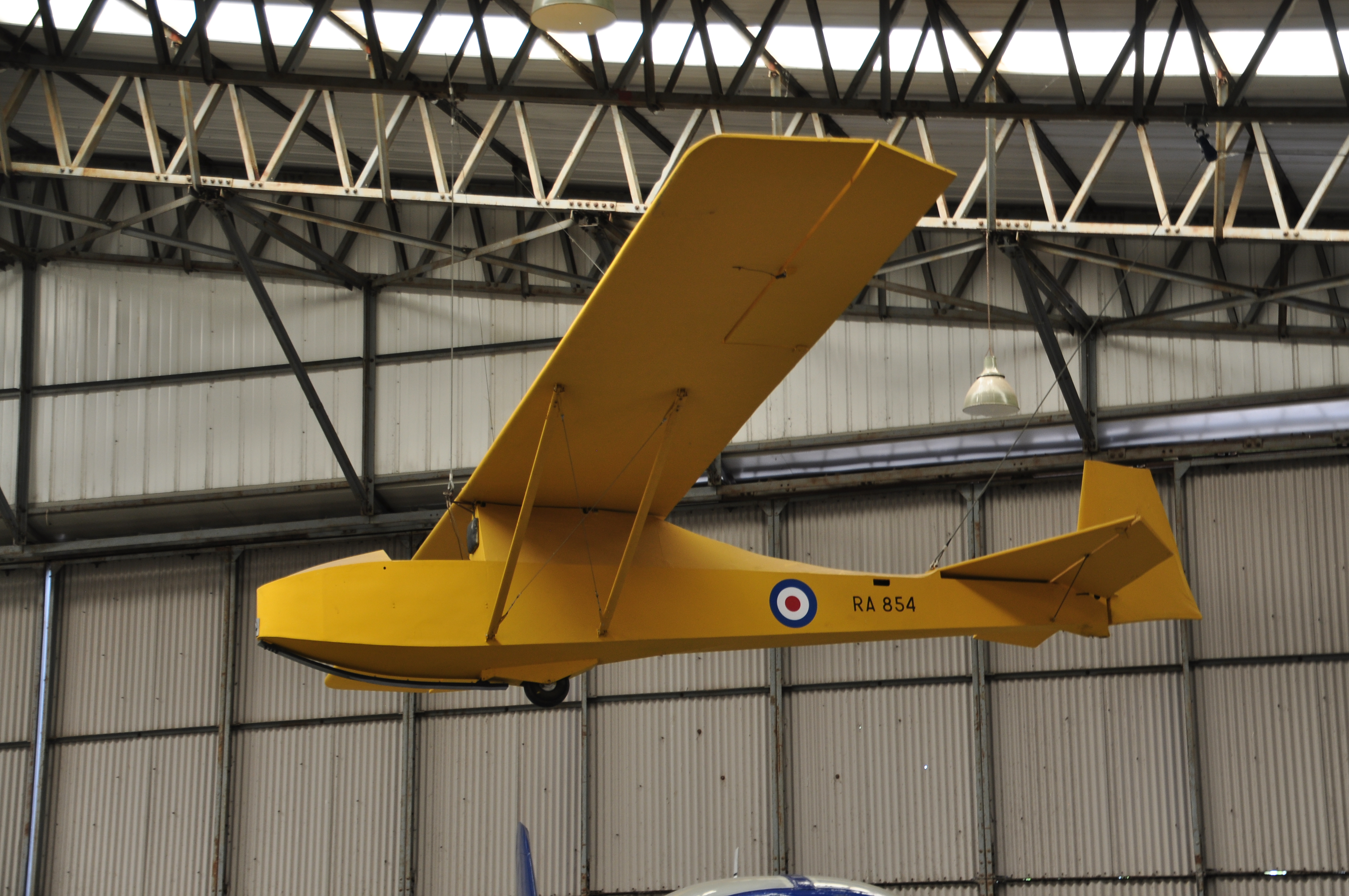
A Slingsby Cadet at Yorkshire Air Museum

After WWII operations ran down, with Hearn's Hesketh Park operation closing in 1946. At Hooton Park, Hearn turned to manufacturing over 70 gliders for Slingsby Sailplanes, including the Kirby Kite 2 (at least 7 built), Cadet (24), Tutor (20), and Sedburgh,(19) as well as some Motor Tutors. They also took on non-aviation activities, such as maintaining and repairing buses and armoured cars.

The company owned Avro Anson G-AIRN from 1947 to 1950, which was leased to local airline Starways from May 1949.

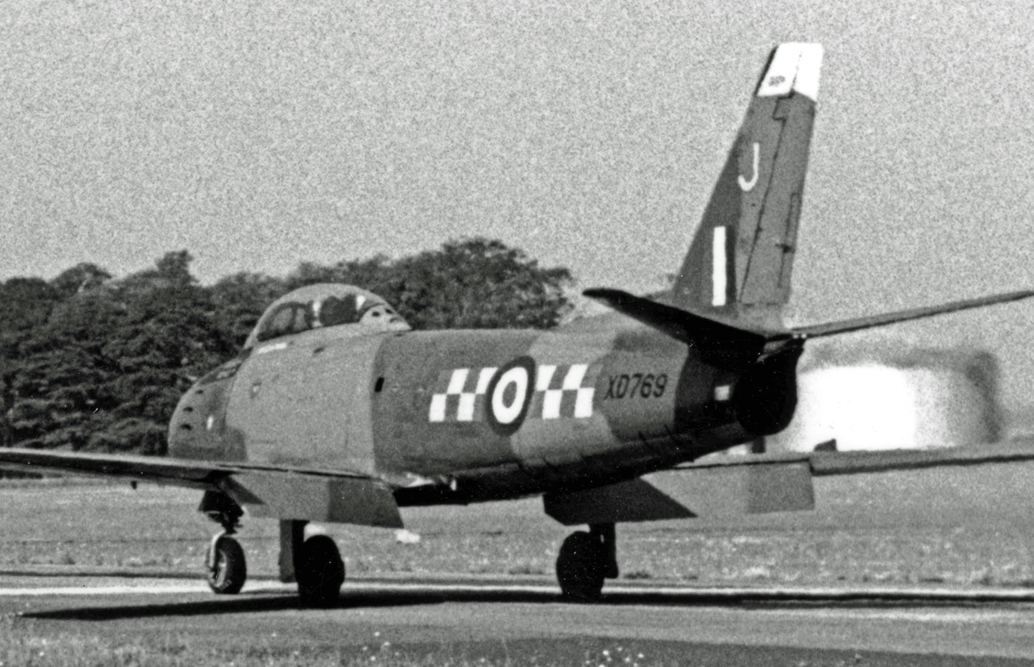
RAF Canadair Sabre F.4 XD769 at Hooton Park in July 1955

Around this time North Eastern Airways disposed of the company. Martin Hearn was voted off the board in 1947, and the company was renamed Aero-Engineering and Marine (Merseyside) Ltd, which supplied de Havilland with some parts for Chipmunks and Comets, and won a large order for the maintenance of RAF and Royal Canadian Air Force Canadair Sabres.

Martin Hearn departed to run a hotel adjacent to the airfield, called the Glider Club, which he did for 25 years. Aero-Engineering and Marine (Merseyside) closed in 1955.

== Accidents and incidents ==
- Avro 504N G-AFRK, registered to Martin Hearn Ltd, was stored under the old Hooton Park racecourse grandstand because private flying was banned during the war. On 7 August 1940 it was one of 19 aircraft destroyed in "The Great Fire".

== Bibliography ==
- Longworth, James H. (2005). Triplane to Typhoon. Preston, Lancashire: Lancashire County Developments Ltd. ISBN 1-8-999-07-971.
- Riding, Richard (2013). A Flying Life (eBook). Fonthill Media Ltd. ISBN 9781781554142.
