= Slingsby Kite =

British single-seat glider, 1935

T.6/T.23 Kirby Kite
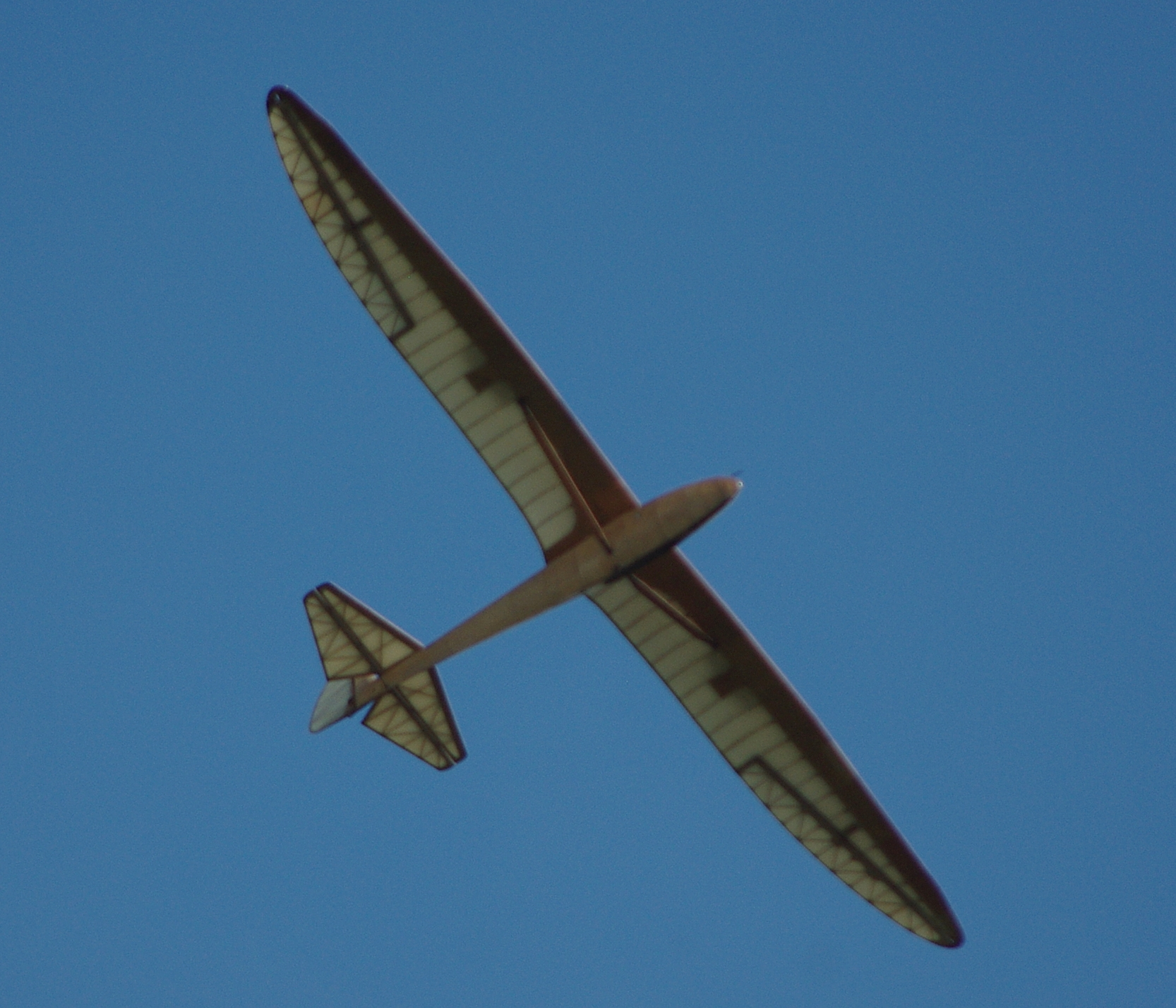
- Shuttleworth Collection's T.6 Kirby Kite

General information
- Type: Sport Glider
- National origin: United Kingdom
- Manufacturer: Slingsby Sailplanes
- Designer: Fred Slingsby
- Number built: 25 (+1 from plans in the United States)

History
- First flight: August 1935
- Developed from: Slingsby T.5 Grunau Baby II

The Slingsby T.6/T.23 Kirby Kite was a single-seat sport glider produced from 1935, by Fred Slingsby in Kirbymoorside, Yorkshire.

== Design and development ==
During the early 1930s there was a dearth of high-performance gliders that could be flown by relatively inexperienced pilots. To remedy this shortcoming Fred Slingsby modified the Grunau Baby design with longer gulled wings and rounded fuselage formers skinned with plywood, resulting in the T.6 Kirby Kite. Later developments included spoilers to improve landing performance and an enlarged rudder which improved the harmony of the controls.

Further re-design was carried out at the end of World War II, with a raised wing pylon, landing wheel and spoilers fitted as standard. The T.23 Kite 1A flew in December 1945 but did not enter production due to the limited improvement in performance, but further development was planned, as the Type 23A, with a new 1° dihedral straight wings, the production of which is uncertain. The final iteration of the Slingsby Grunau Baby derivatives was the T.26 Kite 2, which introduced an entirely new wing, an enclosed cockpit, straight tapered wings and other detailed improvements.

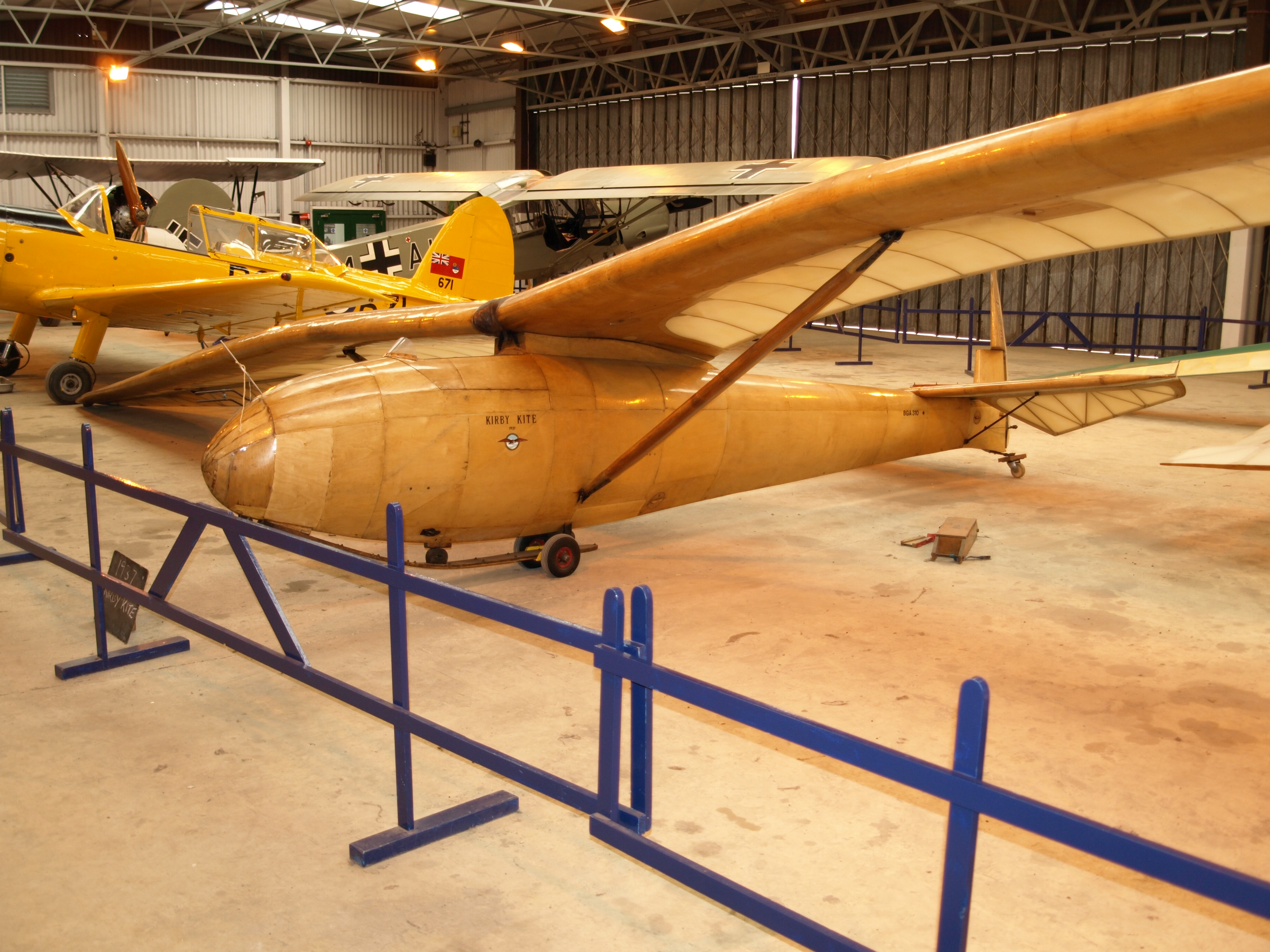
Slingsby T.6 Kirby Kite BGA310 at Old Warden, 2013

== History ==
The T.6 Kirby Kite was immediately in demand for competition and club flying, but their performance was soon overtaken by newer gliders. Production continued until 1939 totalling 25, of which one was exported to South Africa, one to Canada and one to Rhodesia. One more was built from plans by Herman Kursawe in the USA. Almost all the Kirby Kites still flying at the outbreak of World War II were impressed into the Royal Air Force for use as training aircraft for assault glider pilots.

Kirby Kites were also used, along with other types of glider, to assess the ability of the Chain Home radar system to detect aircraft largely constructed of wood. These tests carried out over the English Channel were successful in showing that even gliders with very little metallic content could be detected, though the strength of return depended on how much metal was on board. After use by the Glider Training Schools the surviving Kirby Kites were passed to the Air Training Corps. Eight Kirby Kites survive, one has new wings. Another is being built using some original parts.

== Operators ==
United Kingdom

Royal Air Force
No 1 Glider Training School
Air Training Corps

== Variants ==
T.6 Kite
the initial re-design of the Grunau Baby. Twenty-five built.
T.23 Kite 1A
Improved T.6 developed after World War II. One built.
Type 23A
A planned development of the T.23, with a new straight wing with 1° dihedral.
T.26 Kite 2
The final extrapolation, in 1946-7, of the Kite series with a completely different wing, enclosed cockpit and other detailed refinements.
T.26 Kite 2A
Modified wash-out at the wing-tips.
T.26 Kite 2B
As for the 2A, with air-brakes instead of spoilers.

== Specifications (T.6 Kite 1) ==
Data from The World's Sailplanes:Die Segelflugzeuge der Welt:Les Planeurs du Monde

General characteristics

- Crew: 1
- Length: 20 ft 4 in (6.2 m)
- Wingspan: 46 ft 7 in (14.2 m)
- Wing area: 156.0 sq ft (14.49 m^{2})
- Aspect ratio: 13
- Airfoil: Göttingen 535
- Empty weight: 310 lb (140.5 kg) equipped
- Max takeoff weight: 495 lb (224.5 kg)

Performance

- Stall speed: 31 mph (50 km/h, 27 kn)
- Never exceed speed: 70 mph (113 km/h, 61 kn)
- Aerotow speed: 97 mph (156 km/h; 84 kn)
- Winch launch speed: 80 mph (130 km/h; 70 kn)
- g limits: +6
- Rate of sink: 154 ft/min (0.78 m/s) at 34 mph (55 km/h; 30 kn)
- Lift-to-drag: 21 at 40 mph (64 km/h; 35 kn)
- Wing loading: 3.2 lb/sq ft (15.5 kg/m^{2})

== See also ==
Related lists

- List of gliders
