= Slingsby Kirby Tutor =

British single-seat glider, 1937

T.8 Kirby Tutor (Cadet TX.2)
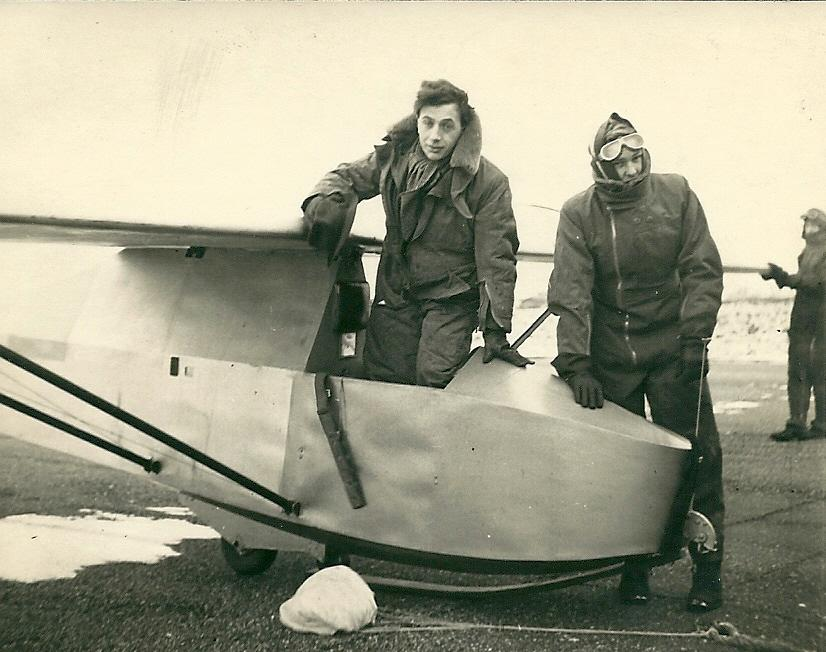

General information
- Type: Sport Glider
- National origin: United Kingdom
- Manufacturer: Slingsby Sailplanes
- Designer: John Sproule
- Number built: T.8 Kirby Tutor - ca 44 (+kits and wing sets) T.8 Cadet TX Mk.2 - 62

History
- First flight: 1937
- Developed from: Slingsby T.7 Kirby Kadet and BAC VII
- Variant: Slingsby T.29 Motor Tutor

The Slingsby T.8 Kirby Tutor was a single-seat sport glider produced from 1937, by Fred Slingsby in Kirbymoorside, Yorkshire.

== Design and development ==
The T.8 Kirby Tutor (a.k.a. Taper-wing Kadet) came about at the request of the Midland Gliding Club which wanted a higher performance aircraft to progress to after the T.7 Kirby Kadet. John Sproule adapted the wings from a BAC VII to fit onto the T.7 Kirby Kadet fuselage. The higher-aspect ratio wings gave a measurable increase in performance for minimum cost. Gliding clubs could also elect to buy the wings alone and fit them to Kirby Kadet fuselages as required. Post-war the absence of spoilers was rectified by a modification which was applied to most surviving aircraft.

== History ==
The T.8 Kirby Tutor was immediately popular but only seven complete aircraft were sold before the outbreak of World War II, as well as kits of parts, spares and sets of wings (for retrofit to T.7 Kirby Kadets). The T.8 Tutor was also produced for use by the Air Training Corps, being renamed Slingsby T.8 Cadet TX Mk.2. Sixty-two Cadet TX Mk.2s were ordered from 1944 with simple windscreens and landing wheels.

Postwar Slingsby sub-contracted Martin Hearn Ltd to build 25 new T.7 Kirby Kadets and 25 new T.8 Kirby Tutors and these were followed by about a dozen more built by Slingsby at Kirbymoorside. The interchangeability of the components led to many hybrid aircraft having wings and fuselages of all types mixed together. During the 1960s the numbers dwindled, especially when an urgent inspection of the main-spars was called for. The cost of the inspection and resultant rectification work often exceeded the value of the aircraft, with many being withdrawn from use. An example is on display at the Gliding Heritage Centre.

== Operators ==
United Kingdom

Air Training Corps

== Specifications ==
Data from British Gliders and Sailplanes 1922-1970, and The World's Sailplanes:Die Segelflugzeuge der Welt:Les Planeurs du Monde

General characteristics

- Crew: 1
- Length: 20 ft 11 in (6.37 m)
- Wingspan: 43 ft 5 in (13.24 m)
- Wing area: 170.0 sq ft (15.79 m^{2})
- Aspect ratio: 11
- Airfoil: Göttingen 426
- Empty weight: 353 lb (160 kg) equipped
- Max takeoff weight: 570 lb (258.5 kg)

Performance

- Stall speed: 30 mph (49 km/h, 26 kn)
- Never exceed speed: 90 mph (145 km/h, 78 kn)
- Aerotow speed: 70 mph (110 km/h; 61 kn)
- Winch launch speed: 66 mph (106 km/h; 57 kn)
- g limits: +6
- Rate of sink: 175 ft/min (0.89 m/s) at 34 mph (55 km/h; 30 kn)
- Lift-to-drag: 18 at 39 mph (63 km/h; 34 kn)
- Wing loading: 3.4 lb/sq ft (16.4 kg/m^{2})

== See also ==
- Slingsby Kirby Cadet

Aircraft of comparable role, configuration, and era

- BAC VII

Related lists

- List of gliders
