= Cadet UT-1 =

American glider

UT-1

General information
- Type: Glider
- National origin: United States
- Manufacturer: Cadet Aeronautics
- Designer: Alex Dawydoff
- Status: Prototype only produced
- Number built: One

History
- Manufactured: 1943
- Introduction date: 1943
- First flight: 1943
- Developed from: Slingsby Kirby Cadet

The Cadet UT-1 is an American single-seat, high wing, strut-braced glider modified by Alex Dawydoff from the original Slingsby Kirby Cadet design and produced by Cadet Aeronautics.

== Design and development ==
In 1942 Dawydoff obtained the plans and the rights to produce the Slingsby Cadet under licence from Fred Slingsby. Dawydoff had the plans redrawn to US measurements, the structural strength increased, plus a new tow hook and wing rigging design. The wing is assembled using just one 4 ft (1.2 m) long pin per wing.

The UT-1 is built predominantly from wood, with the fuselage wooden framed and covered in plywood. The wing and tail are also wooden-framed and covered in doped aircraft fabric covering. The two-spar wing is supported by dual struts.

Dawydoff's plan was to gain government support to provide the UT-1 in kit form for assembly by schools and clubs. The government money was not forthcoming and the post-war period saw a large number of surplus military training gliders saturate the market. As a result, only one UT-1 was completed. It is now located in the National Soaring Museum.

== Aircraft on display ==
- National Soaring Museum - 1

== Specifications (UT-1) ==
Data from Soaring

General characteristics

- Crew: one
- Wingspan: 38 ft 5 in (11.71 m)
- Wing area: 172.5 sq ft (16.03 m^{2})
- Aspect ratio: 8.5:1
- Airfoil: Go 426
- Empty weight: 276 lb (125 kg)
- Gross weight: 450 lb (204 kg)

Performance

- Maximum glide ratio: 14.7:1 at 30 mph (48 km/h)
- Rate of sink: 210 ft/min (1.1 m/s) at 28 mph (45 km/h)
- Wing loading: 2.6 lb/sq ft (13 kg/m^{2})

== See also ==
- List of gliders
