= Slingsby Kite 2 =

British single-seat glider, 1948

Kite 2

General information
- Type: Medium performance sailplane
- National origin: United Kingdom
- Manufacturer: Slingsby Sailplanes Ltd.
- Number built: 15

History
- First flight: 1948
- Developed from: Slingsby Kite

The Slingsby Type 26 Kite 2 was a post World War II development of the Slingsby Kite, a single seat medium performance sailplane. It sold in small numbers.

== Development ==
At the end of World War II Slingsby Sailplanes built a revised and updated version of their earlier and quite successful Type 6 Kite, designated the Type 23 Kite 1A. This did not perform well and only one model was built. Following this, Slingsby developed the Type 26 Kite 2, a more thoroughly redesigned Kite. It had a new wing and a stretched fuselage.

The Kite 2 was a fabric covered wooden aircraft. The original Kite (and the Kite 1A) had gull wings of curved planform, but the Kite 2's wings had constant 2.5^{o} dihedral over the whole span and a straight tapered planform. The old Göttingen aerofoil was replaced with a newer NACA pair. There were no flaps, but spoilers were fitted to the upper wing surface. The wing was pylon mounted and, as on the earlier Kite, a single lift strut on each side linked wing and lower fuselage. The pilot sat immediately in front of the pylon under a canopy which blended into it. The canopy and surrounding fuselage fairing lifted off in one piece for access. The cockpit revision slightly increased the length of the nose, but most of the 1030 mm (40.6 in) fuselage extension was behind the wings. The tail unit of the Kite 2 was the same as that of its predecessors, with an aerodynamically balanced rudder with a deep and rounded trailing edge mounted on a fin that was little more than a rudder-post. The tailplane, braced from below and on the top of the fuselage was far enough forward that the elevator hinges were ahead of the rudder post. There was strong taper on the horizontal surfaces and a large cut out in the elevators to allow rudder movement. A monowheel was added aft of the nose skid.

The Kite 2 first flew in 1948. Including the prototype, three Kite 2s were built by Slingsby, the last two with altered washout at the wingtips and designated Kite 2A. One of these later had its spoilers replaced with airbrakes, becoming a Kite 2B. After that production was taken over by Martin Hearn Ltd., where eleven more Kite 2s were built. One Kite 2B was built with a Skylark 2 tail unit. The unmodified Kite 2A flew with the Royal Air Force Gliding and Soaring Association. Some Kites flew with open cockpits.

== Specifications (Kite 2) ==
Data from Ellison 1971, p. 196

General characteristics

- Crew: 1
- Length: 7.22 m (23 ft 8 in)
- Wingspan: 15.20 m (49 ft 10 in)
- Wing area: 14.49 m^{2} (156.0 sq ft)
- Aspect ratio: 15.56
- Airfoil: NACA 2412 at root, NACA2009 at tip
- Empty weight: 190.5 kg (420 lb)
- Gross weight: 281.2 kg (620 lb)

Performance

- Maximum speed: 161 km/h (100 mph, 87 kn)
- Stall speed: 54 km/h (34 mph, 29 kn)
- Maximum glide ratio: 23:1
- Wing loading: 19.53 kg/m^{2} (4.00 lb/sq ft)
