= Civilian Repair Organisation =

British co-ordinator of aircraft repair in World War II

The Civilian Repair Organisation (CRO) was a branch of the British Air Ministry (later, of the Ministry of Aircraft Production), formed in 1939 to co-ordinate maintenance and repairs of military aircraft by civilian firms.

It should not be confused with the Civil Repair Organisation, which carried out similar functions for the UK Air Ministry in India between 1943 and 1945.

== Background ==
Following the outbreak of World War II, on 11 September 1939 the No.1 Civilian Repair Unit (CRU) was established at the Cowley works of Morris Motors, to be staffed by civilians under the management of the Air Ministry. On 6 October 1939, Sir Kingsley Wood (the Secretary of State for Air) officially appointed William Morris (Lord Nuffield) as Director General (Maintenance), to organise and manage the Civilian Repair Organisation (CRO), to control the CRU and participating civilian firms. Nuffield, as the head of Morris Motors, had been in charge of the shadow factory for aircraft production at Castle Bromwich.

CRO administration was established at Magdalen College, Oxford. On 14 May 1940, supervision of the CRO was transferred from the Air Ministry to the newly formed Ministry of Aircraft Production, under Lord Beaverbrook. The No.1 CRU was supplemented by the No.1 Metal and Produce Recovery Depot (MPRD), established adjacent to the existing Cowley works. At Cowley, a support unit was established in the form of No.50 Maintenance Unit (MU), to transport damaged aircraft and parts to the CRU and to firms participating in the CRO, and also to collect non-repairable parts and scrap for materials reclamation at MPRD. Individual Maintenance Units came under the control of No.43 Group, RAF Maintenance Command.

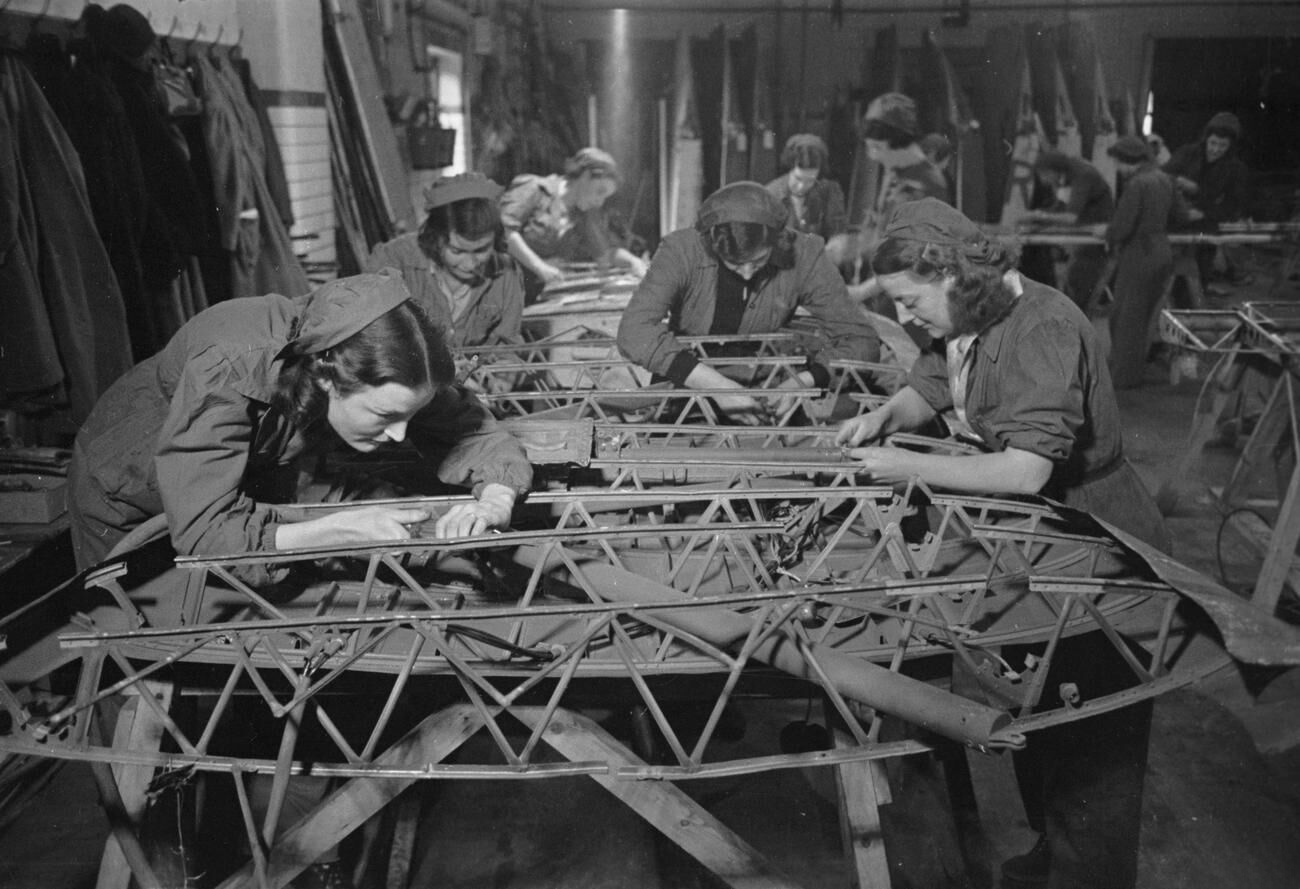
Civilian workers carrying out salvage and repair work on a wing of a Fairey Swordfish aircraft

The civilian firms under individual contracts from the CRO were mostly existing companies engaged in the production, maintenance, repair and operation of aircraft in the UK. Those were supplemented by additional companies in the engineering and woodworking industrial sectors. Repairs to whole aircraft or parts of aircraft were often carried out in dispersed industrial factories, then transported to airfields for re-assembly and test flying, before re-delivery to RAF units. For cases of minor repairs that could be achieved quickly, aircraft could be flown to a CRO firm based at an airfield, repaired, and flown out the following day by the same pilot; these were known as "Fly In" repairs.

== List of firms participating in the CRO ==
Principal ref: Sturtivant 2007

Company	Locations	Work
Air Dispatch Ltd.	Cardiff	Repair Audax, Hawker Hart, Hector, Henley, Hind, Westland Lysander, Potez, Wicko; parts of Wellington; Vengeance modifications
Air Service Training Ltd	Exeter, Hamble	Repair Airacobra, Handley Page Hampden, Mustang, Seafire, Spitfire; parts of Spitfire; Mosquito modifications
Airspares Ltd	Hyde	Remove parts from crashed aircraft, for reuse.
Airspeed (1934) Ltd.	Christchurch, Portsmouth	Repair Airspeed Oxford
Air Taxis Ltd	Altrincham, Barton, Middleton	Repair Anson, Dominie
Airtraining (Fair Oaks) Ltd.	Fair Oaks	Repair Bristol Beaufighter, Beaufort, Blenheim
Airtraining (Oxford) Ltd.	Kidlington	Repair Hawker Hurricane
Airwork General Trading Co. Ltd.	Gatwick, Loughborough, Renfrew, Staverton	Repair Avro Anson (S), Battle, Blenheim, Douglas Boston (L), Havoc, Lancaster parts, Lysander, Oxford, Spitfire, Tomahawk, Wellington, Whitley (G); Wellington conversions
Albany Sheet Metal & Engineering Co. Ltd.	Oldham	Repair Beaufighter, Blenheim; parts of Mosquito
Anchor Motors Co. Ltd.	Chester	Parts of Wellington
A.P. Aircraft Ltd.	Coventry	Parts of Blenheim
Sir W.G. Armstrong Whitworth Aircraft Ltd.	Coventry	Repair Armstrong Whitworth Whitley
Atlantic Coast Airlines Ltd.	Barnstaple	Repair Anson, Falcon, Fox Moth, de Havilland Hornet Moth, Hawker Hotspur, Lysander, Magister, Martinet, Mentor, Proctor, Tiger Moth, Tutor, Whitney Straight
Austin Motor Co. Ltd.	Cofton Hackett, Elmdon, Marston Green	Repair Battle; parts of Short Stirling
A. V. Roe & Co. Ltd.	Bracebridge Heath, Chadderton, Langar, Ringway, Waddington, Woodford, Yeadon	Repair Anson, Avro Lancaster, Avro Manchester; parts of Lancaster; Anson modifications, Manchester modifications
J.Berry & Sons Ltd.	Sywell	Parts of Blenheim, Hotspur, Oxford; Master modifications
Blackburn Aircraft Ltd.	Abbotsinch, Sherburn	Repair Blackburn Shark, Blackburn Skua, Fairey Swordfish; parts of Firebrand, Short Sunderland; Skua mods
Boulton & Paul Aircraft Ltd.	Wolverhampton	Repair Wellington; parts of Blackburn Roc; Wellington modifications
Bristol Aeroplane Co. Ltd.	Weston-super-Mare, Whitchurch	Repair Beaufort, Blenheim, Bombay; parts of Supermarine Sea Otter, Sunderland, Wellington
Brooklands Aviation Ltd.	Doncaster, Northampton, Sywell	Repair Wellington; parts of Lancaster
Brush Coachworks Ltd.	Loughborough	Repair Hampden; parts of Hereford
Burtonwood Repair Depot	Great Sankey	Repair Buffalo; mods, repair & overhaul various USAAC aircraft
Campbell Engineering Ltd.	Bromley	Salvage
Cunliffe-Owen Aircraft Ltd.	Eastleigh, Macmerry, Marwell, Silloth, Southampton	Repair Fairey Albacore, Blenheim, Boston, Cleveland, Henley, Lockheed Hudson, Tomahawk, Hawker Typhoon, Vultee Vengeance, Lockheed Ventura
John Curran Ltd.	Cardiff	Repair Beaufighter, Blenheim, Martinet
de Havilland Aircraft Co. Ltd.	Hatfield, Leavesden, Witney	DH.82 Queen Bee, DH.86B; parts of Miles Magister
Dobson & Barlow Ltd.	Samlesbury	Repair Halifax, de Havilland Vampire
Entwistle & Kenyon Ltd.	Accrington	Parts of Albemarle, Beaufighter, Beaufort, Blenheim, Stirling, Tiger Moth, Wellington
Fairey Aviation Ltd.	Hamble, Hayes, Heaton Chapel, Ringway	Repair Albacore, Anson, Fairey Battle, Seafox, Swordfish; parts of Albacore, Fairey Firefly, Fairey Fulmar, Gordon, Halifax, Spearfish, Swordfish; Fulmar mods
Fairfield Aviation Ltd.	Odham's Press (Watford), Elstree	Repair Audax, Hart, Hector, Hind, Lysander, Master, Wellington
Field Consolidated Aircraft Services Ltd. / Rollason Aircraft Services Ltd.	Croydon, Hanworth, Tollerton	Repair Beaufighter, Beechcraft, Eagle, Hampden, Harrow, Hereford, Hudson, Hurricane, Oxford, Wellington; modifications to Horsa, Oxford, Wellington; parts of Albemarle, Audax, Battle, Demon, Hampden, Hereford, Hurricane, Oxford, Proctor, Wellington
Folland Aircraft Ltd.	Hamble	Parts for Beaufighter, Beaufort, Spitfire
General Aircraft Ltd.	Hanworth	Repair Argus, Beaufighter, Beaufort, Blenheim, Blenheim, Hotspur, Hoverfly, Hurricane, Mustang, Spitfire
Gloster Aircraft Co. Ltd.	Hucclecote, Staverton, Stoke Orchard	Repair Henley, Gloster Meteor; parts of Gloster Gladiator
Green Bros		Maintenance & repair of target aircraft
Handley Page Ltd.	Cricklewood, Radlett	Repair Hampden, Harrow, Heyford; parts of Halifax
Handley Page Ltd.	York Aircraft Repair Depot [YARD]	Repair Halifax; Halifax modifications
Hawker Aircraft Ltd.	Brooklands, Kingston upon Thames, Langley	Repair Hart, Hind, Hurricane, Tempest, Typhoon
Helliwells Ltd.	Walsall	Repair Harvard, Hurricane; Harvard modifications
Herts and Essex Aviation Ltd.	Broxbourne	Repair ATC gliders, Avro Commodore, Desoutter, Magister, Proctor, Puss Moth, Q-6, Taylorcraft, Vega Gull, Whitney Straight
Heston Aircraft Co. Ltd.	Harmondsworth (Penguin factory), Heston	Repair Spitfires
Lancashire Aircraft Corp Ltd.	Burnley, Samlesbury	Repair Beaufighter, Beaufort
William Lawrence & Co. Ltd.	Colwick	Parts of Anson, Hotspur, Tiger Moth
London, Midland and Scottish Railway	Barassie, Derby, Wolverton	Repair Hampden, Hereford, Lancaster, Spitfire, Whitley
London Passenger Transport Board	Chiswick	Parts of Halifax
Marshalls Flying School Ltd.	Teversham	Repair Albemarle, Anson, Fortress, Gladiator, Harvard, Master, Mosquito, Oxford, Typhoon, Whitley; parts of Anson, Fortress, Gladiator, Hart, Magister, Master, Oxford, Whitley; overhaul Dakota, Mosquito
Martin Hearn Ltd.	Hooton Park, Little Sutton	Repair Anson, ATC gliders, Mosquito
T. McDonald & Sons	Balado Bridge, Kirkcaldy	Repair Blenheim, Boston, Fulmar, Hudson, Lodestar, Mustang, Tomahawk; parts of Dakota, Stirling, Sunderland, Ventura
Morris Motors Ltd.	Cowley	Repair Hurricane, Magister, Master, Spitfire; parts of Tiger Moth
Morrisons Engineering Co. Ltd.	Horsey Toll	Repair Hurricane; parts of Wellington
Wm. Mumford Ltd.	Billacombe	Parts of Blenheim
Newbarn Engineering Co. Ltd.	Rochdale	Parts of Beaufort
Norbury Joinery & Cabinet Works Ltd.	Norbury	Repair Horsa, Hotspur
North Eastern Aircraft Components Ltd.	Gateshead	Parts of Boulton Paul Defiant, Oxford
Papworth Industries Ltd.	Papworth Everard	Repair ATC gliders
Park Ward Co. Ltd.	Willesden	Parts of Magister, Master
Parker Knoll Ltd.	High Wycombe	Repair Hotspur
Parnall Aircraft Ltd.	Yate	Repair Hendy Heck
George Parnall & Co. Ltd.	Fishponds	Parts of Beaufighter, Beaufort
Percival Aircraft Ltd.	Luton	Repair Vega Gull, Q-6
Phillips & Powis Aircraft Ltd. / Miles Aircraft Ltd.	Woodley	Repair Magister, Mentor
Pilkington Bros. Ltd.	Kirk Sandall	Parts of Halifax
Portsmouth Aviation Ltd.	Farlington, Portsmouth	Repair Envoy, Kirby Cadet, Oxford, Puss Moth; parts of Courier, Horsa, Master; Barracuda mods
Pressed Steel Co. Ltd.	Cowley	Parts of Typhoon
Redwing Aircraft Ltd.	Croydon, Thornton Heath, Wolverhampton	Repair Blenheim, Lysander, Wallace; parts of Battle, Beaufighter, Beaufort, Blenheim, Defiant, Halifax, Hurricane, Tempest, Typhoon, Wellington
Reid & Sigrist Ltd.	Desford	Airacobra, Defiant; parts of Harvard, Mitchell
Rollason Aircraft Services Ltd.	Croydon	Repair Audax, Battle, Demon, Gladiator, Hampden, Harrow, Hart, Hereford, Hurricane, Oxford
Rolls-Royce Ltd.	Hucknall	Repair Beaufighter, Hurricane; Hurricane conversions
Rootes Securities Ltd.	Blythe Bridge, Meir, Shawbury, Speke	Repair Blenheim; parts of Halifax
David Rosenfield Ltd.	Barton	Repair Battle, Fulmar, Hurricane
Saunders-Roe Ltd.	Cowes	Repair Lerwick, London, Stranraer, Walrus
Scottish Aviation Ltd.	Doncaster, Edzell, Greenock, Hendon, Macmerry, Melton Mowbray, Merryfield, Prestwick, Silloth	Repair ATC gliders, Battle, Catalina, Lerwick, Liberator, London, Oxford, Proctor, Roc, Skua, Spitfire, Stranraer, Sunderland; parts of Queen Bee
Scottish Motor Traction Co. Ltd.	Edzell, Merryfield	Repair Corsair, Hellcat, Hudson; parts of Dakota
SEBRO Ltd.	Bourn, Cambridge	Repair ATC gliders, Bv.222, R3O, Sunderland; parts of Singapore; mods of Short C-class, Hereford, Seafire, Stirling;
Short Bros (Rochester & Bedford) Ltd.	Rochester, South Marston, Swindon	Repair Singapore, Sunderland; parts of Queen Bee, Seaford; Sunderland mods
Short & Harland Ltd.	Belfast	Parts of Stirling, Sunderland
Shrager Bros Ltd.	Edmonton, Old Warden	Repair Desoutter, Heston Phoenix, Leopard Moth, Magister, Proctor, Q-6, Vega Gull, Whitney Straight; mods for Harvard, Mustang
Slingsby Sailplanes Ltd.	Kirbymoorside	Repair Hadrian, Hengist
Southern Aircraft (Gatwick) Ltd.	Gatwick, Tinsley	Repair ATC gliders, Battle, Blenheim, Expeditor, Fairchild, Harvard, Hornet Moth, Moth Minor, Puss Moth, Reliant, Tiger Moth, Vega Gull; parts of Argus, Corsair, Spitfire, Vigilant, Wellington
SS Cars Ltd.	Bishop's Tachbrook, Coventry	Repair Whitley; parts of Wellington, Whitley
Supermarine (Vickers-Armstrongs) Ltd.	Woolston	Repair Spitfire, Walrus; parts of Stranraer
Surrey Flying Services Ltd.	Hamsey Green, Sanderstead	Repair Audax, Battle, Hart, Hornet Moth, Magister, Monospar, Phoenix, Puss Moth
James H. Sutcliffe & Son Ltd.	Todmorden	Parts of Halifax, Hotspur, Oxford, Tiger Moth
Taylorcraft Aeroplanes (England) Ltd.	Mountsorrel, Rearsby, Syston, Thurmaston	Repair Auster, Harrow, Hurricane, Taylorcraft, Tiger Moth; parts of Wellington
Tollerton Aircraft Services Ltd.	Tollerton	Repair Hampden, Harrow, Hereford, Lancaster, Liberator, Manchester
Vickers-Armstrongs (Aircraft) Ltd.	Brooklands	Repair Wellesley, Wellington; parts of Blenheim
Vickers-Armstrongs Ltd.	Chester	Repair Wellington
Vickers-Armstrongs Ltd.	Blackpool	Repair Wellington
Vickers-Armstrongs Ltd.	Castle Bromwich	Parts of Spitfire
J.W. Walker & Sons Ltd.	Ruislip	Unknown
Wallows (Walsall) Ltd.	Walsall	Parts of Blenheim, Halifax, Hurricane, Mustang, Wellington
Western Airways Ltd.	Weston-super-Mare	Repair Anson, ATC gliders, Cub, Mohawk, Swallow, Tomahawk
Westland Aircraft Ltd.	Ilchester, Yeovil	Repair Lysander, Welkin
Wrightways Air Services Ltd.	Eccles	Repair Q-6, Scion

== Summary of operations ==
In the period May 1940 to July 1945, CRO had returned a total of 79,000 aircraft to the flight line. At that point, of all the heavy aircraft then flying in the RAF, 36.5% (3,285) had been processed through CRO. Activities continued for several years after the end of World War II.

== Bibliography ==
- Postan, M.M. 1952. History of the Second World War - British War Production. HMSO
- Sturtivant, Ray and Hamlin, John. 2007. RAF Flying Training and Support Units. Air-Britain ISBN 0-85130-365-X
- Wright, Peter. "From Scraps to Scrap", Aeromilitaria, December 2010
