= Air Service Training =

Flight engineering training school in Scotland

- Industry: Aeronautical engineering and flying training
- Founded: 1931
- Founder: John Davenport Siddeley
- Defunct: April 10, 2025
- Fate: In Administration
- Headquarters: Perth, Scotland
- Number of employees: 28
- Parent: UHI Perth

Air Service Training (AST) was an organisation in Perth, Scotland, that has been training engineers and pilots for airlines, maintenance organisations and the military since 1931. It was owned by Perth College UHI, with training taking place on the college campus and at Perth Airport, near Scone. In addition to holding a UKCAA Part 147 Approved Basic Training Approval AST Also held Direct Foreign EASA Part 147 Basic Training Approval and Nepalese NCAR 147 Approval.

== Engineering training ==
Working with the college, AST delivers aeronautical engineering courses for professionals so they can meet European Aviation Safety Agency (EASA) standards. These range from introductions to aircraft systems and maintenance processes to approved courses needed for Licensed Aircraft Engineer (LAE) status. They include: approved Part 66 Category A; approved Part 66 Category B; Category B sandwich course, non-certifying courses and modular courses.

AST also runs academic courses up to BEng (hons) degree in aircraft maintenance. European Aviation Safety Agency licences are generally regarded as suitable qualifications for beginning a career in aviation.

== Approved courses ==
AST had approval to run courses from ARB, CAA, JAA and European Aviation Safety Agency and met the JAR-147 requirements to deliver and assess the JAR-66 Ab-Initio course. It also gained approval under EASA Part 147 regulations and was previously the preferred training provider of national and international companies, such as Cathay Pacific, British Airways, BMI, EasyJet, Ryanair and Bristow Helicopters.

AST had also been the preferred training provider for aircraft engineer licensing for several military and governmental organisations, including the Royal Flight of Oman, Kuwait Air Force and the British Army Air Corps.

As well as approved courses for engineer licensing, AST also provided customised training for individuals and organisations, including aircraft mechanics, aeronautical fundamentals and helicopter maintenance fundamentals.

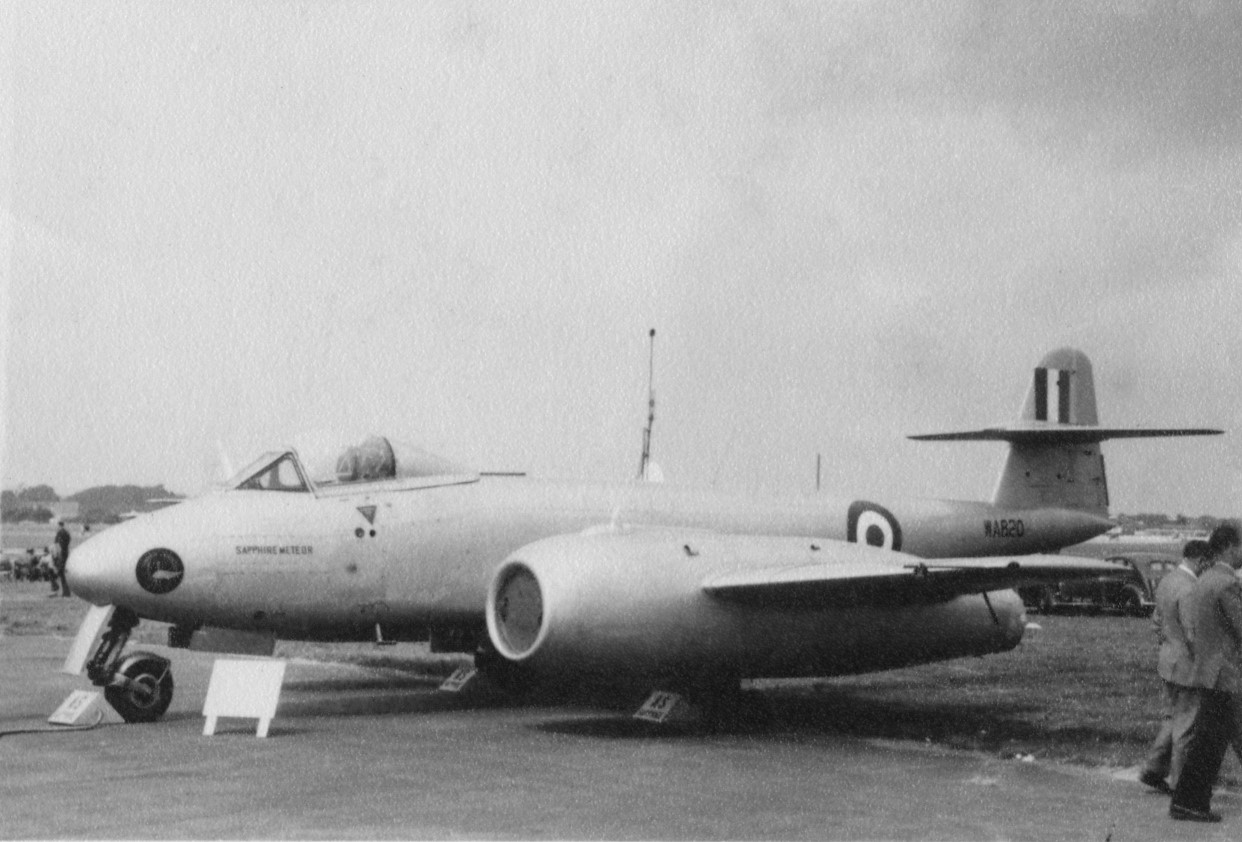
The sapphire Meteor was converted by Air Service Training

== History ==
The Aeronautical Engineering College, founded by John Davenport Siddeley, opened in 1931 at Hamble aerodrome in Hampshire and operated there until 1960, when it moved to Perth Airport. More than 160,000 engineers and pilots from 150 countries have been trained as a result.

Air Service Training was originally Airwork Services Training, and at various times was part of the British & Commonwealth group and Bristow Helicopters. After its flying college closed, the aeronautical engineering college became a wholly owned subsidiary of Perth College UHI in September 1996.

On 10 April 2025, Air Service Training Limited was placed into administration by its owner Perth College UHI.

== Famous former students ==
Former AST aviation students include: Mrs Victor Bruce, the first female pilot to circumnavigate the globe; Amy Johnson, holder of records for flying to Australia and Japan, and Sir Alan Cobham, founder of the flying circus and the Cobham Company.
