= Slingsby Motor Tutor =

British motor glider, 1948

T.29 Motor Tutor
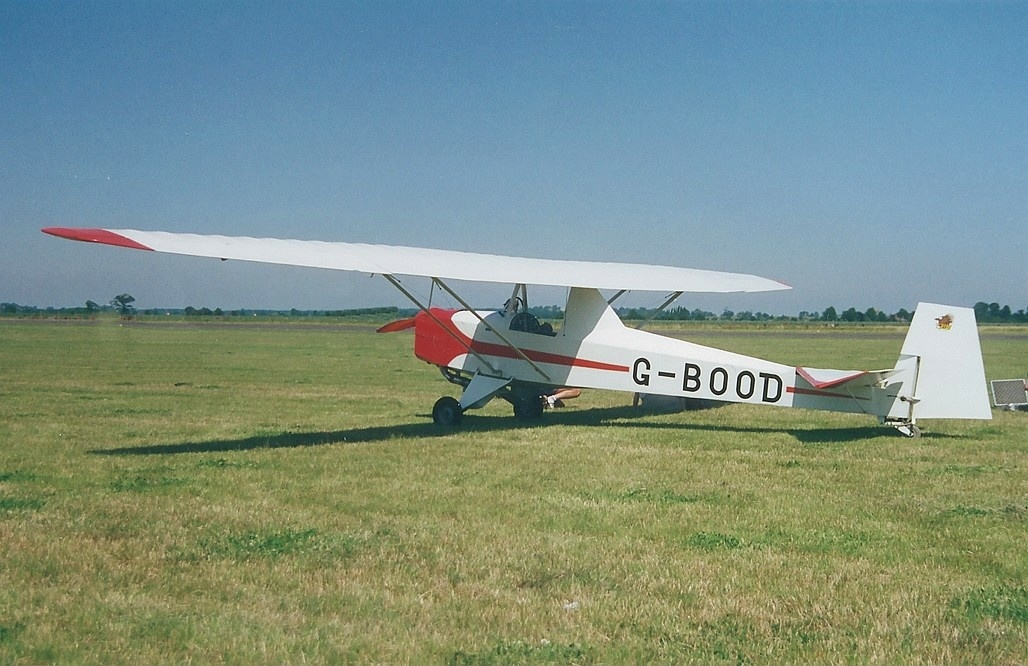

General information
- Type: Motorglider
- National origin: United Kingdom
- Manufacturer: Slingsby Sailplanes
- Designer: John Sproule
- Number built: 3

History
- First flight: 1948
- Developed from: Slingsby T.8 Kirby Tutor

The Slingsby T.29 Motor Tutor was a single-seat motor glider produced from 1948, by Slingsby Sailplanes in Kirbymoorside, Yorkshire.

== Design and development ==
Utilising the wings, struts and tail unit of the T.8 Kirby Tutor, the T.29 Motor Tutor had a new fuselage incorporating a wheeled undercarriage and the cockpit under the wing centre section. Early trials revealed resonance of the front wing struts, which was rectified by adding a vertical bracing strut up to the main spar. This modification was introduced for all Kirby Tutors to allow aero-tow launching.

== Development ==
Two versions of the T.29 Motor Tutor were produced, T.29A with a 25h.p. Scott Flying Squirrel engine and the T.29B with a 40 h.p. Aeronca JAP J.99. Both of these versions flew successfully but considerable difficulty was had certificating the aircraft with the Air Registration Board, which precluded production. The T.29A was exported and the T.29B crashed at Dunstable in 1964. In 1966 an additional T.29 was discovered by R.G. Boyton at Epsom in Surrey, and is stored pending restoration.

== Specifications (T.29B) ==
Data from Jane's All the World's Aircraft 1952–53

General characteristics

- Crew: 1
- Length: 20 ft 0 in (6.10 m)
- Wingspan: 43 ft 4 3/4 in (13.227 m)
- Height: 6 ft 2 in (1.88 m)
- Wing area: 170 sq ft (16 m^{2})
- Aspect ratio: 11:1
- Airfoil: Gottingen 426
- Empty weight: 570 lb (259 kg)
- Gross weight: 807 lb (366 kg)
- Fuel capacity: 9.5 imp gal (11.4 US gal; 43 L)
- Powerplant: 1 × J.A.P. 2-cylinder air-cooled horizontally-opposed, 37 hp (28 kW)

Performance

- Maximum speed: 71 mph (114 km/h, 62 kn)
- Cruise speed: 67 mph (108 km/h, 58 kn) at sea level
- Stall speed: 34 mph (55 km/h, 30 kn)
- Range: 275 mi (443 km, 239 nmi)
- Service ceiling: 11,400 ft (3,500 m) (Absolute ceiling: 16,000 ft (4,900 m))
- Rate of climb: 410 ft/min (2.1 m/s)

== See also ==
- Slingsby T.8 Kirby Kadet

Aircraft of comparable role, configuration, and era

- BAC Drone

Related lists

- List of gliders
