= Slingsby Kirby Cadet =

British single-seat glider, 1935

T.7 Kirby Cadet
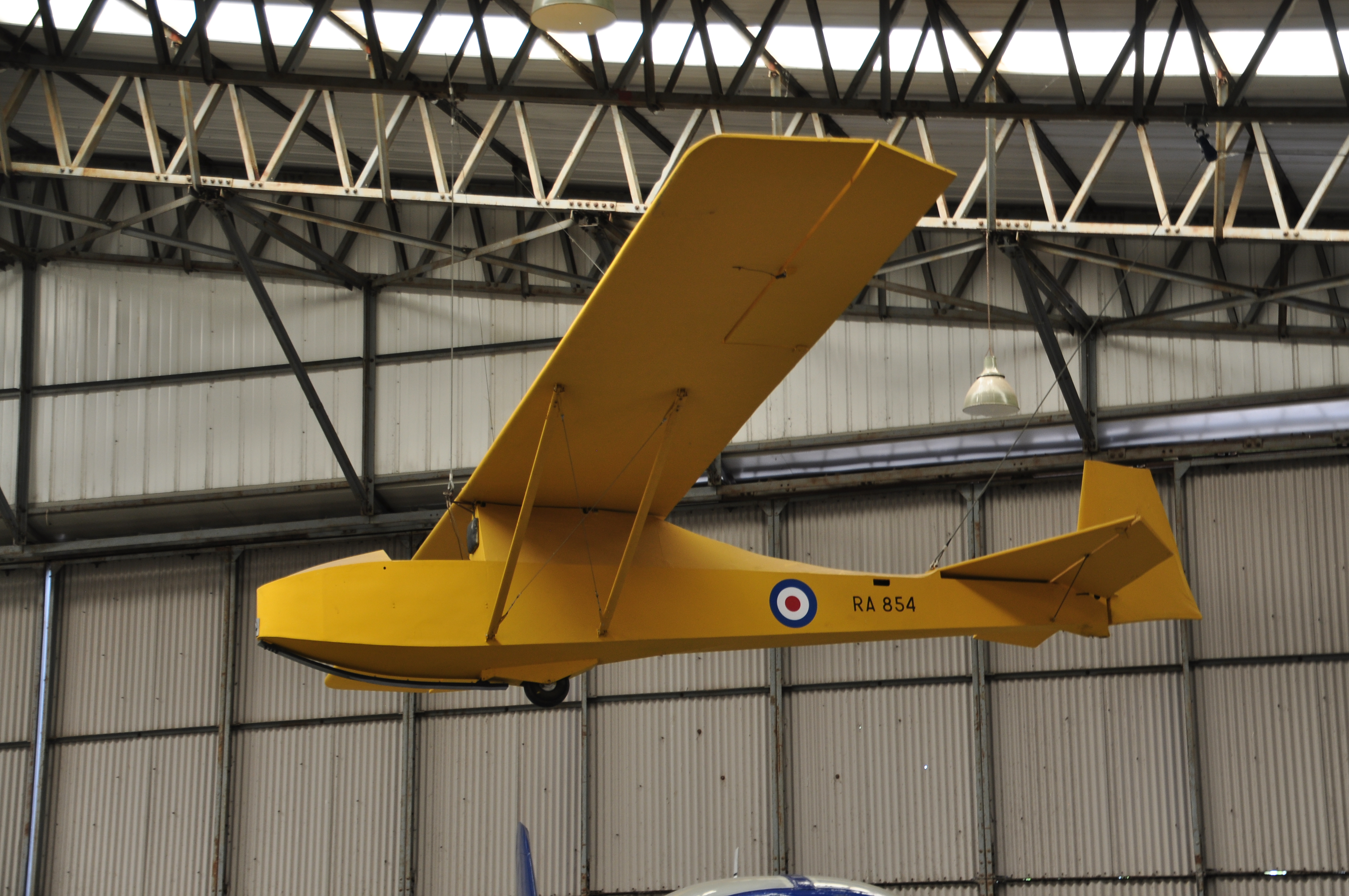

General information
- Type: Training glider
- National origin: United Kingdom
- Manufacturer: Slingsby
- Number built: 376

History
- First flight: 1935
- Variant: Cadet UT-1

The Slingsby T.7 Kirby Cadet is a British training glider designed and built by Slingsby that first flew in 1935 and saw service with the Royal Air Force for use by the Air Training Corps as the Cadet TX.1 throughout the 1950, 1960s and 1970s.

== Design and development ==
The T.7 was developed to specification 20/43 from the civilian Kirby Kadet to meet an Air Ministry requirement for a training glider as part of the air cadet programme, and it entered service as the Cadet TX.1 with the Royal Air Force. It was further developed with a change of wing into the T.8 Kirby Tutor (service name Cadet TX.2) which in turn was developed into a two-seat version the T.31B Tandem Tutor (service name Cadet TX.3). One saw service in SLAF from 1957-1959.

== Former operators ==
United Kingdom

- Royal Air Force

Sri Lanka

- Royal Ceylon Air Force

== Specifications ==
Data from

General characteristics

- Crew: 1
- Length: 20 ft 10.6 in (6.364 m) (later production)
- Wingspan: 41.7 ft (12.7 m)
- Wing area: 170 sq ft (15.8 m^{2})
- Aspect ratio: 8.67
- Airfoil: Göttingen 426
- Empty weight: 297 lb (134.5 kg)
- Gross weight: 513 lb (232.7 kg)

Performance

- Wing loading: 3.0 lb/sq ft (14.7 kg/m^{2})

== See also ==
Related development

- Slingsby Kirby Tutor
- Slingsby Tandem Tutor

Related lists

- List of aircraft of the Royal Air Force
- List of gliders
