= Manuel VI Primary =

British single-seat glider, 1930

General information
- Type: Primary glider
- National origin: UK
- Designer: W. L. Manuel
- Number built: 1

History
- First flight: 30 August 1930

The Manuel VI Primary was a wire-braced monoplane primary glider designed and built by W L. (Bill) Manuel whilst serving in the RAF in 1930. It flew successfully but only one was built.

== Design and development ==
The Manuel Primary was a wooden aircraft built around an open, vertical, tapered girder with a horizontal upper member and a lower one shaped at the front into a shallow keel. The girder was strengthened with a series of vertical and diagonal cross-pieces. The keel projected forward of the foremost vertical member and carried the pilot's seat on its upper edge. The thick-profile wing was attached to the upper part of the girder and was straight edged with constant chord apart from the angled tips of the ailerons. Extensions of two of the forward girder cross-pieces formed a triangular structure over the wing which acted as a king post for a pair of landing wires. Flying wires from the keel and the upper member about halfway to the rear of the girder carried the lifting loads on the wing. There were also bracing wires from wing to the rear of the aircraft to restrain horizontal bending of the girder. The rectangular tailplane was likewise fixed to the top of the girder and carried elevators with a cut-out in which the all-moving rectangular rudder, which extended to the lower girder, could operate.

== Operational history ==
The glider flew for the first time on 30 August 1930 at RAF Hawkinge in Kent, where Corporal Manuel was based. He made many more flights in it and other Channel Gliding Club pilots also flew it. It was finally destroyed in a road accident in the way to a meeting near Brighton in October 1930.

== Specifications ==
Data from British Gliders and Sailplanes 1971 p.142

General characteristics

- Crew: 1
- Length: 18 ft 11 in (5.77 m)
- Wingspan: 39 ft 0 in (11.89 m)
- Wing area: 192.5 sq ft (17.88 m^{2})
- Aspect ratio: 7.8

== See also ==
Aircraft of comparable role, configuration, and era

- Stamer Lippisch Zögling
- B.A.C. I
- Slingsby Primary
- DFS SG 38 Schulgleiter
