= RRG Falke =

German single-seat glider, 1930

Falke
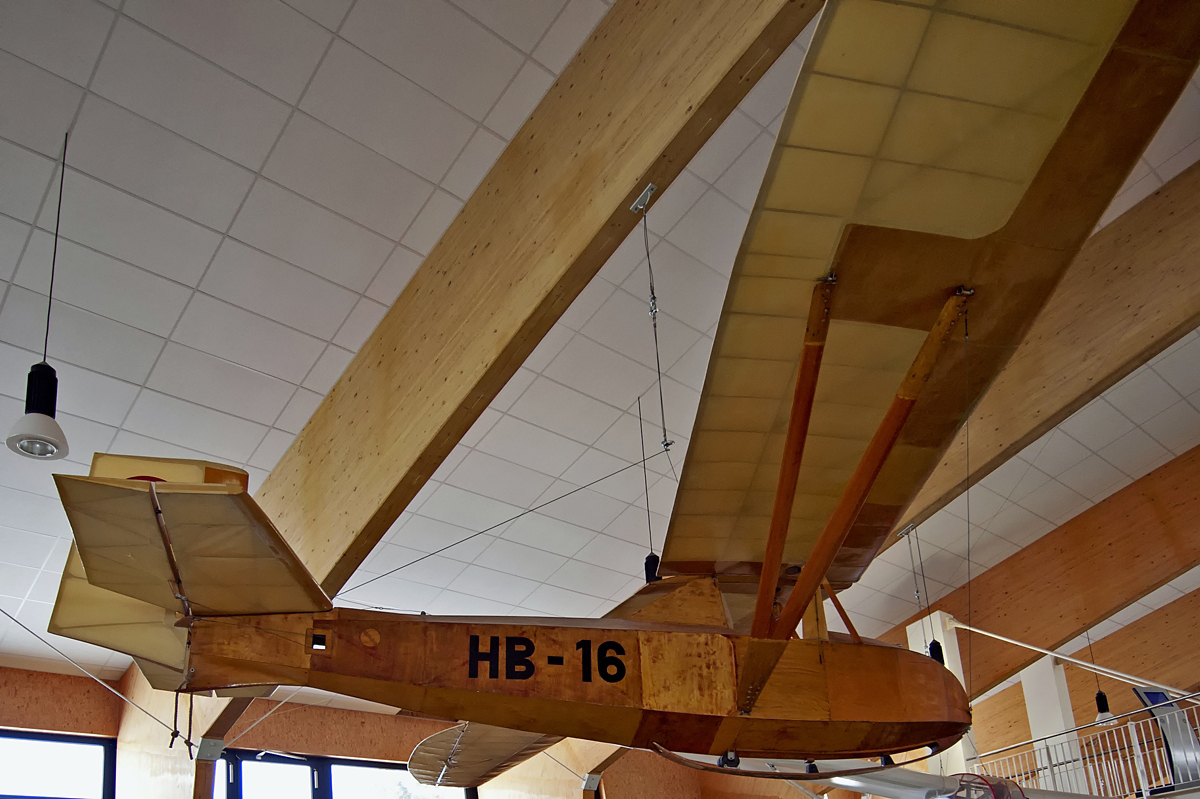

General information
- Type: Secondary training glider
- National origin: Germany
- Manufacturer: Rhön-Rossitten Gesellschaft (RRG)
- Designer: Alexander Lippisch

History
- First flight: 1930

The RRG Falke (English: Falcon) of 1930 was a secondary training glider designed by Alexander Lippisch in Germany and intended to provide better performance than his earlier RRG Prüfling whilst being easier to fly because of its inherent stability. It was sold as plans for both club and commercial production and was built in Germany and abroad.

== Design and development ==
Secondary gliders were meant to be used by student pilots after an introduction to flight in primary gliders like Lippisch's Zögling. His first secondary glider, the 1926 RRG Prüfling, was disappointing, with a performance not much better than some contemporary primaries; lacking inherent stability its handling was not good either. After that design Lippisch had been working on aircraft which relied on wing sweep to provide stability in pitch, having no horizontal tail. The wing of the Storch IV was swept at about 17° and carried lobate ailerons which extended behind the rest of the trailing edge and were hinged at right angles to the fuselage line. He decided that his ideal secondary glider should use a similar wing but also have a conventional tail which enabled him to dispense with the wing tip fins and rudders of the Storch and to reduce the wing sweep to about 12°.

The inner part of the Falke's wing had constant chord but it became a little narrower outboard where the trailing edge sweep decreased. The ailerons increased the chord again to about its inboard value. It was a two spar structure with plywood covering from the forward spar around the leading edge, forming a D-shaped torsion box. Aft the wing, including the ailerons, was fabric covered. It was mounted high over the fuselage on two vertical underwing cabane struts, one on each side of the open cockpit to the forward wing strut and by a ply covered, triangular support pylon centrally behind it. On each side a V-pair of lift struts braced the two wing spars, at about 40% of the span, to the lower fuselage longeron.

The Falke's fuselage had a hexagonal cross section with deep vertical sides and was ply covered from the nose to the rear of the cockpit. On the underside this covering extended aft to the tail where the fuselage sides were again ply covered. The similarly covered fin, with an almost vertical leading edge was topped by the rudder's ply covered aerodynamic balance forward of the hinge. The rest of the rudder was fabric covered apart from its tip. The broad tailplane, mounted on top of the fuselage ahead of the fin to which it was braced with single strut on each side, had straight swept leading edges and square tips and carried elevators that were rectangular apart for a cut-out for rudder movement. The horizontal tail was fabric covered except at its leading edge. The glider landed on a long, rubber sprung skid reaching from the nose to well behind the cockpit, assisted by a faired tailskid.

The Falke first flew in 1930 and was sold through plans for construction by clubs and commercial manufacturers. RRG sold twelve quite quickly to the Wasserkuppe club. Alexander Schleicher and Edmund Schneider produced them in Germany and Slingsby built nine in England as the Slingsby Falcon before designing, in 1935, a two-seat version, the Slingsby Falcon III. This had a span of 17.69 m (58 ft 0.5 in) One Slingsby Falcon I was converted into a flying boat glider in 1941. In 1933 one Falke was built in Lithuanian Aviation workshops by the drawings purchased by the Aeroclub of Lithuania. Following its crash in 1936 a slightly modified unlicensed version of Falke was built by A. Gysas.

In 1931 the Falke RVa appeared, with an increased span and revised cabane struts. The later Super Falke had a yet larger span but by then the design was seriously outdated.

== Variants ==
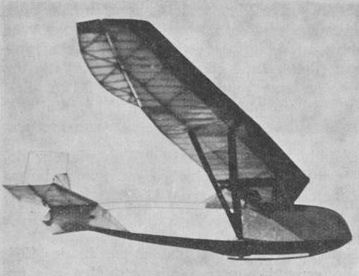
RRG Super Falke photo from L'Aerophile July 1932

Falke
original aircraft, built in 1930.
Falke RVa
increased span and revised cabane struts, built in 1931.
Super Falke
16.88 m (55 ft 4.6 in) span.
Slingsby Falcon
licence built in the UK from 1931. Remained on sale until 1939.
Slingsby Falcon II
rounded tips, simplified rigging and all-ply skin. One only, 1935.
Slingsby Falcon III
two seat version, flown 1935. Remained on sale until 1939.

== Specifications (Falke) ==
Data from Sailplanes 1920-1945 (2006)

General characteristics

- Capacity: One
- Length: 5.255 m (17 ft 3 in)
- Wingspan: 12.60 m (41 ft 4 in)
- Wing area: 18.12 m^{2} (195.0 sq ft)
- Aspect ratio: 8.76
- Empty weight: 165 kg (364 lb)
- Gross weight: 255 kg (562 lb)

Performance

- Wing loading: 14 kg/m^{2} (2.9 lb/sq ft)
