= DFS SG 38 Schulgleiter =

German single-seat glider, 1938

SG 38 Schulgleiter
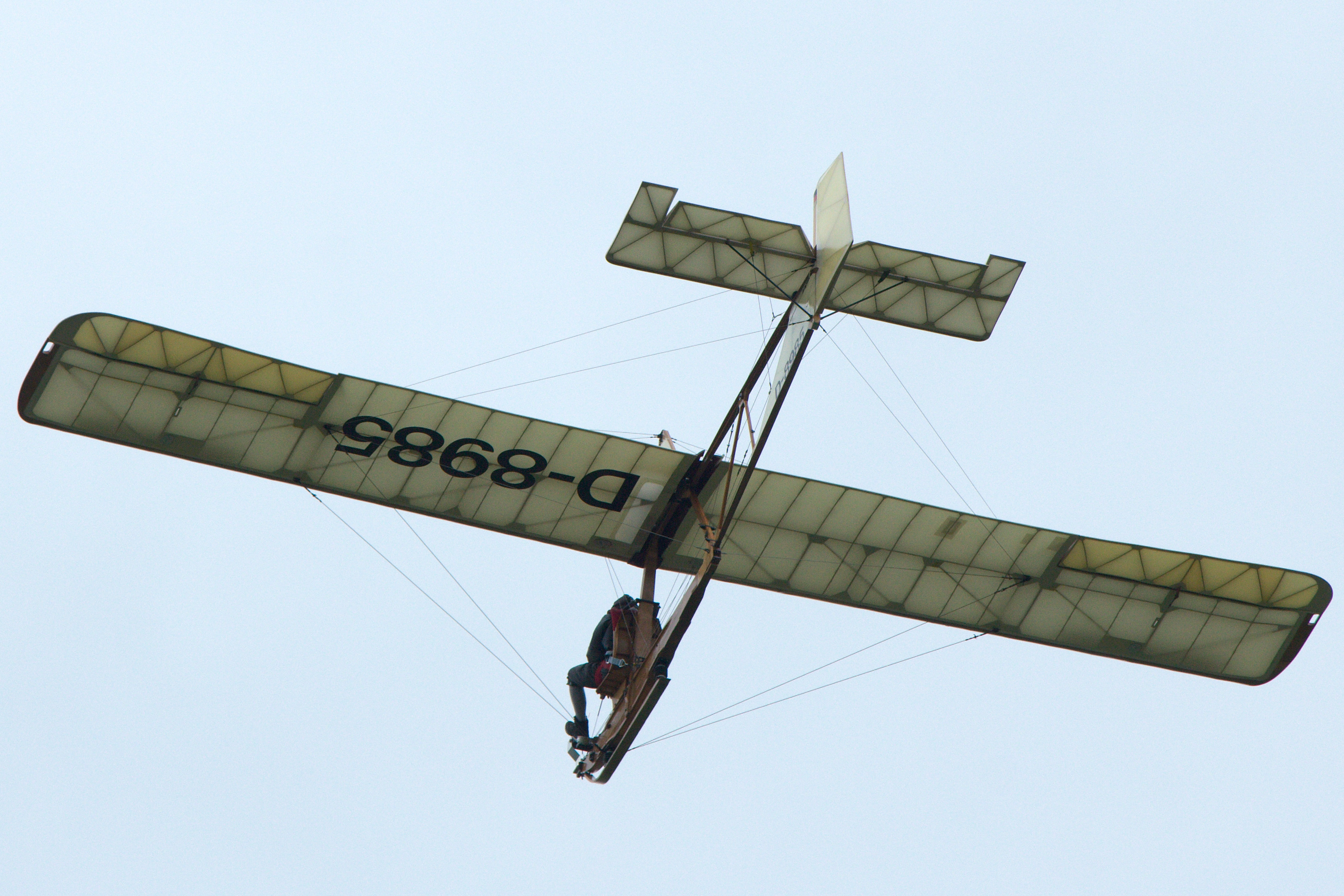
- SG.38 reproduction

General information
- Type: Primary glider
- National origin: Germany
- Designer: Schneider, Rehberg and Hofmann
- Status: No longer in production
- Number built: about 10,000

History
- Introduction date: 1938
- First flight: 1938
- Developed from: Stamer Lippisch Zögling

The Schneider DFS 108-14 SG-38 Schulgleiter (School glider) is a German high-wing, cable-braced, single-seat primary glider that was designed by Schneider, Rehberg and Hofmann at Edmund Schneider's factory at Grunau in 1938, hence the designation. It was produced by several builders, including Deutsche Forschungsanstalt für Segelflug (DFS).

== Design and development ==
The SG 38 was designed to be a training glider for basic flight training by the Nationalsozialistisches Fliegerkorps (NSFK). The usual launch method was by bungee cord from a sloped hill. Because training was conducted solely by solo flight the aircraft had to be very easy to fly and also easy to repair.

The high-wing design uses a kingpost and cable bracing. The primary structure of the glider is of wood, with the wings, tail surfaces and inverted "V" kingpost all finished in doped aircraft fabric covering. The pilot sits on a simple seat in the open air, without a windshield.

The basic configuration was similar to earlier gliders such as the Stamer Lippisch Zögling and the Grunau IX, but the SG 38 was an entirely new design. Improvements included enlarged tail surfaces for better stability, a separate skid mounted on shock-absorbing springs, and an updated seat for the pilot.

== Operational history ==
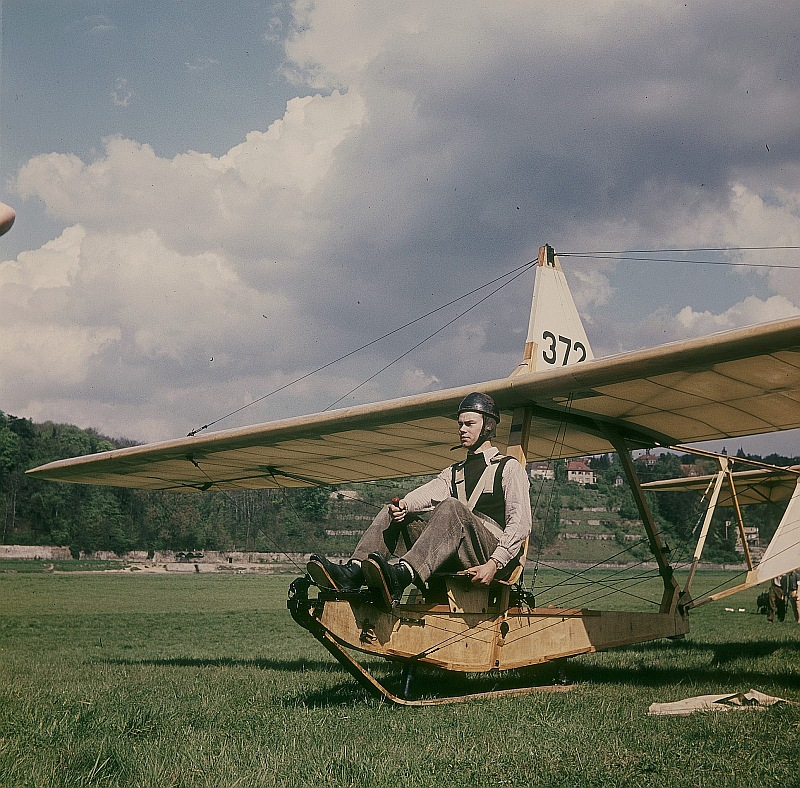
DFS SG.38 Schulgleiter

The SG-38 played a critical role in pilot training for the Luftwaffe in the Second World War, as a simple, but robust, trainer for the rapid increase in the number of pilots needed by Germany. It was commonly flown by bungee launch on the slopes of the Wasserkuppe and the hills of Saarmund.

From 1949 to 1951 Spain's AISA produced 50 licence-built aircraft.

In the UK, Elliotts of Newbury built a copy of the SG.38 called the Elliotts Primary EoN; its version first flown in 1948 and used by the RAF as the Eton TX.1.

During WW2, from 1940 to 1944, the Chinese Nationalist Air Force also used the copied SG-38 glider for basic pilot training in south-west China.

== Aircraft on display ==
- Danmarks Flymuseum, Stauning Vestjylland Airport, Denmark
- Deutsches Museum, Munich, Germany
- Flyhistorisk Museum, Sola, near Stavanger, Norway
- Museo del Aire, Madrid, Spain
- Musée de l'Air et de l'Espace, Paris – Le Bourget Airport, France
- Museu do Ar, Sintra, Portugal
- National Museum of the United States Air Force, Dayton, Ohio, USA
- Shuttleworth Collection, Old Warden, Bedfordshire, England

== Specifications (SG 38) ==
Launching the glider on the Wasserkuppe in Germany.

Data from

General characteristics

- Crew: One
- Length: 6.28 m (20 ft 7 in)
- Wingspan: 10.41 m (34 ft 2 in)
- Height: 2.43 m (8 ft 0 in)
- Wing area: 16 m^{2} (170 sq ft)
- Aspect ratio: 6.76
- Empty weight: 100 kg (220 lb)
- Gross weight: 210 kg (463 lb)

Performance

- Maximum speed: 115 km/h (71 mph, 62 kn)
- Never exceed speed: 115 km/h (71 mph, 62 kn)
- Maximum glide ratio: 10:1 at 52 km/h
- Wing loading: 13.75 kg/m^{2} (2.82 lb/sq ft)

== Bibliography ==
- Sinnhuber, Karl (2012). Salzburg To Stalingrad. UK: Milton Keynes. ISBN 9781471702228.

== See also ==
Related development

- Elliotts Primary EoN
- G 101
- Slingsby Grasshopper

Aircraft of comparable role, configuration, and era

- Detroit G1 Gull
- Harakka
- Jongblood Primary
- Schweizer SGP 1-1

Related lists

- List of gliders
- List of Interwar military aircraft

== Images ==
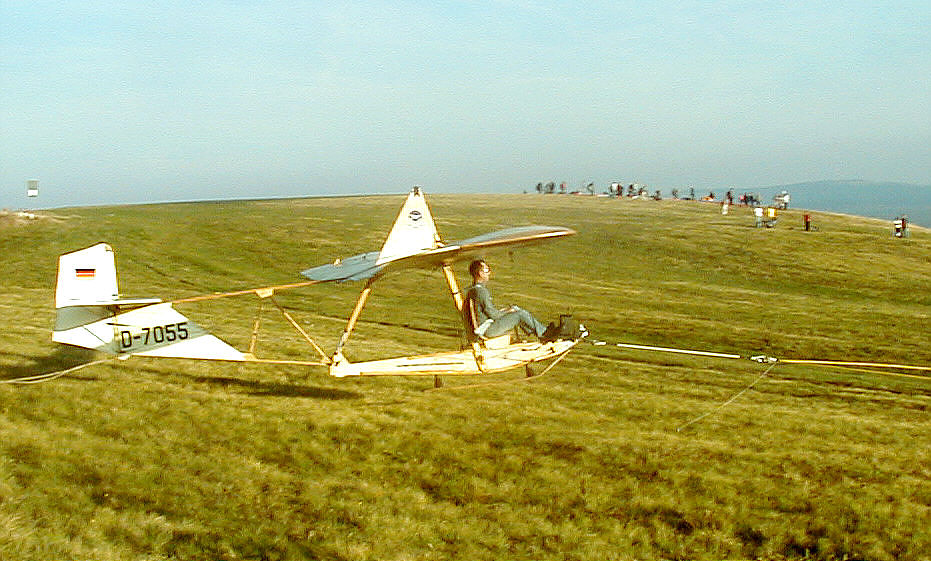
SG-38 bungee launch

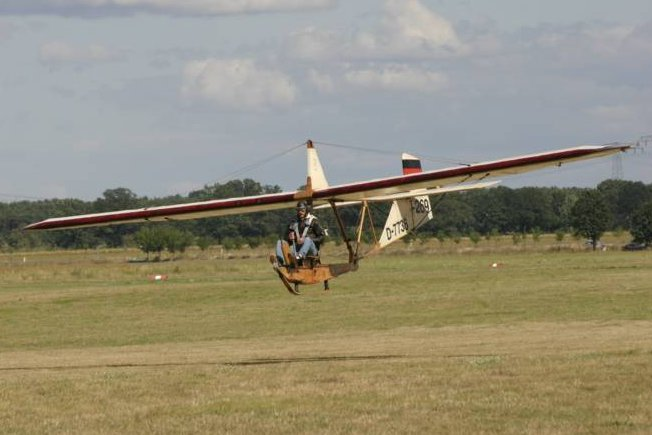
SG-38 landing

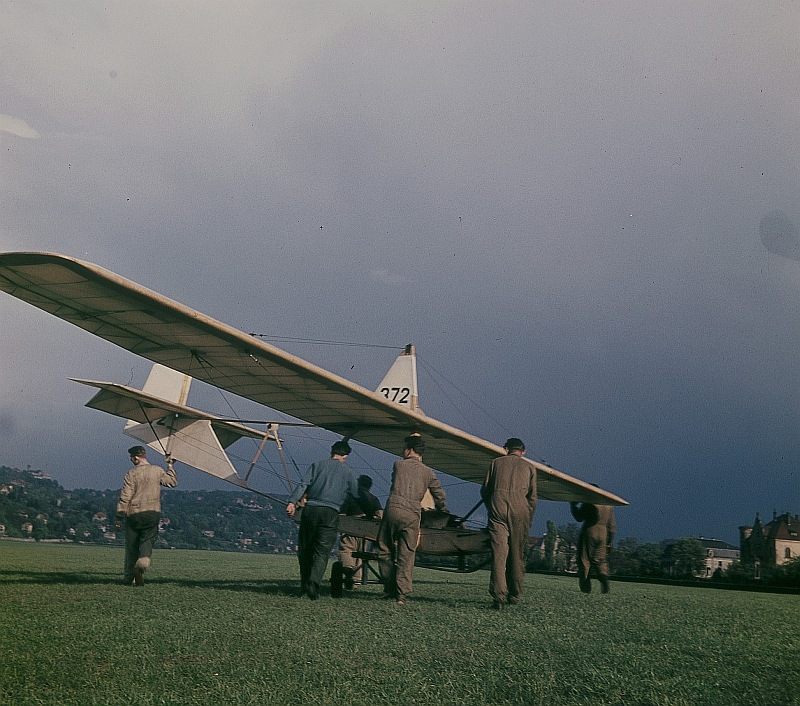
SG-38 being carried to the launch point

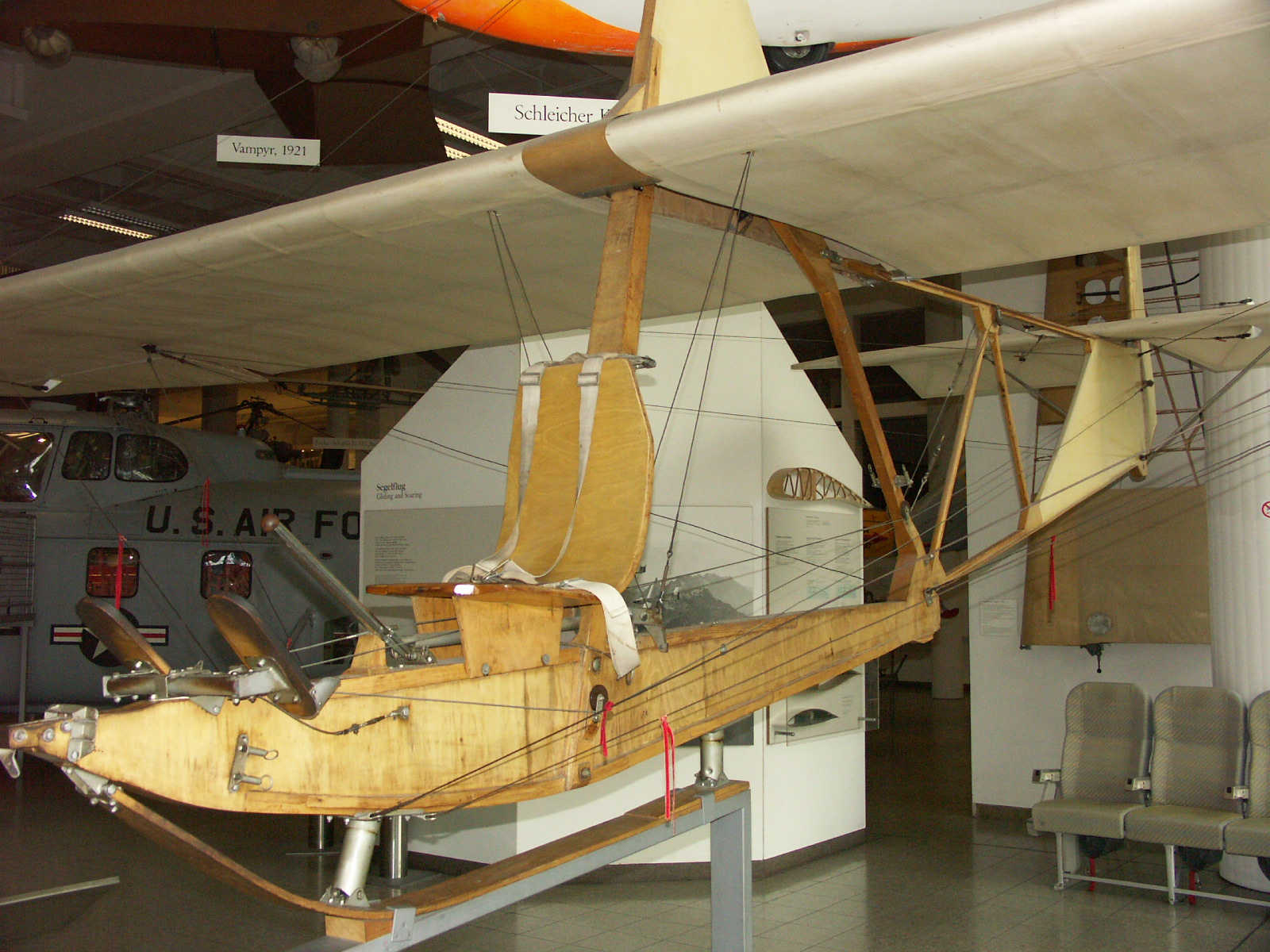
SG-38 in the Deutsches Museum Munich, Germany
