= Cloudcraft Dickson Primary =

British single-seat glider, 1930

Dickson Primary
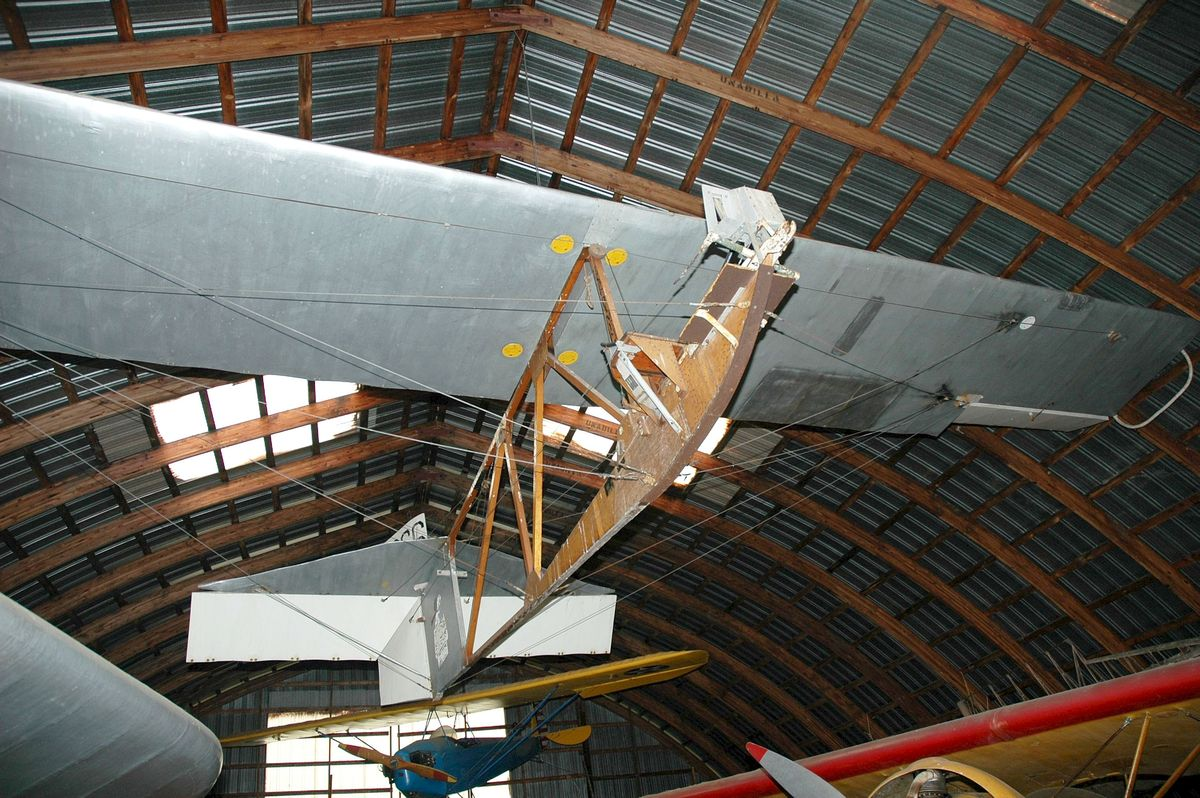
- A replica, built in 1969, displayed at Old Rhinebeck

General information
- Type: Single seat primary glider
- National origin: United Kingdom
- Manufacturer: Cloudcraft Glider Co., Southampton
- Designer: Roger S. Dickson
- Number built: c.30?

History
- First flight: 1930

The Cloudcraft Dickson Primary was a single-seat primary glider designed in the United Kingdom in 1930 to be constructed from plans. Many glider clubs in the UK and the British Empire flew them in the 1930s.

== Design and development ==
Like other primary gliders of the 1930s, the Dickson Primary was aerodynamically unambitious, with its emphasis on low cost and simplicity. It was a wooden high wing aircraft, carrying the pilot on an open seat with a largely open, flat truss girder fuselage behind.

The wing had a two-spar fabric covered structure and was completely rectangular in plan. Ailerons occupied approximately one third of the outer trailing edge. The wing was mounted on the horizontal upper beam of the three-bay fuselage Warren girder. The lower beam, angled slightly upwards rearwards, carried the pilot's seat and controls at its forward end. Pairs of landing wires ran from a longitudinally-orientated inverted V-shaped pylon above the centre of the upper wing to the two spars near the inboard edge of the aileron. Similarly arranged flying wires ran from the same wing points to the keel. Bracing wires from the rear spar, at the same point as the flying wires, were anchored to the lower rear corner of the flat fuselage girder to limit sideways flexing.

The seat and exposed control column were located just ahead of the wing leading edge. A simple skid acted as undercarriage. At the rear, a fabric-covered tailplane, with swept leading edges and carrying rectangular elevators, was mounted on the upper fuselage beam over the whole of the aft fuselage bay. The rearmost vertical member of the girder carried a near-rectangular rudder, which projected above the fuselage led by a slender fin. Lateral stability was enhanced by the fabric covering of the rear bay of the fuselage.

The Dickson Primary flew for the first time in 1930.

== Operational history ==
Only nine Dickson Primarys have established individual identities. However, a Cloudcraft advertisement from July 1931 claimed that there were "over one hundred in use at the present time" in the UK, United States, Australia, New Zealand and South Africa. Some of these may have been built from kits, others from plans published in books and in or by magazines like Flight or bought from Cloudcraft. Certainly one example was built and flying in New Zealand by March 1931. UK gliding clubs (GC) flying Dickson Primarys included the London GC, operating at Dunstable, the Southampton GC and the Stockport GC. The last built their Dickson from plans. Seven years after the first flight, full working drawings were still on offer for 30/- (£1.50) from Flight itself, as they had been in 1931. A modified Dickson Primary was built by a Mr. Dunning at the Southdown Gliding Club, Lancing. After a first flight on 10 March 1934 the Dunning Sailplane was written off in a crash on 20 May 1934.

== Aircraft on display ==
In 2010 a reproduction Dickson Primary was on display at the Old Rhinebeck Aerodrome, New York. The remains of an original aircraft are in storage in the UK.

== Specifications (Dickson Primary) ==
Data from British Gliders and Sailplanes

General characteristics

- Crew: 1
- Length: 17 ft 4 in (5.28 m)
- Wingspan: 34 ft 3 in (10.45 m)
- Wing area: 170.0 sq ft (15.79 m^{2})
- Aspect ratio: 7.0
- Airfoil: Clark YH
- Empty weight: 180 lb (82 kg)

== See also ==
Aircraft of comparable role, configuration, and era Other primary gliders from the early 1930s were:

- B.A.C. II
- SG-38
- RRG Zögling

plus many Zögling clones.
