= London Gliding Club =

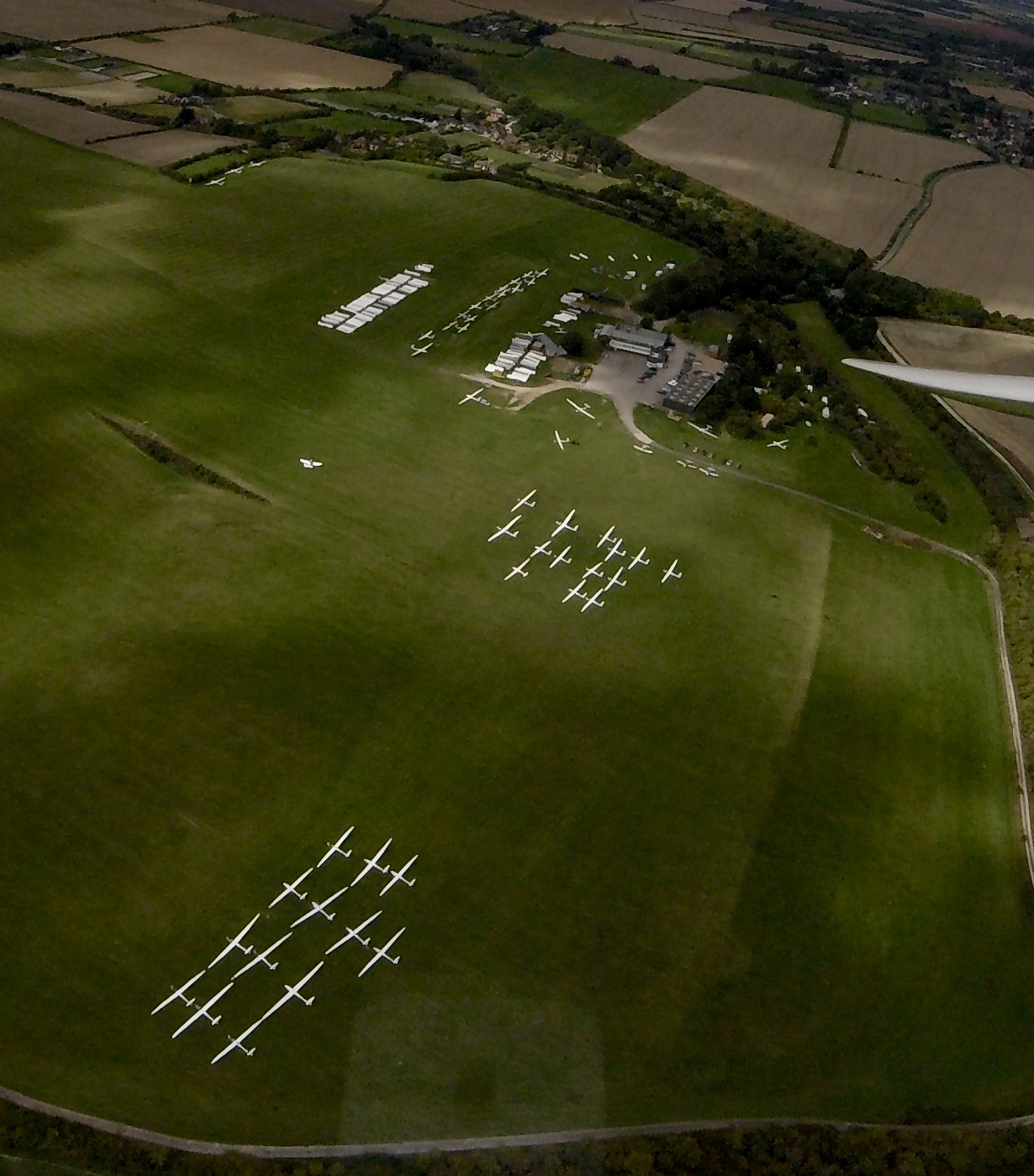
- IATA: none; ICAO: none

Summary
- Airport type: Private
- Location: Dunstable Downs, Bedfordshire
- Coordinates: 51.871733°N 0.546°W
- Website: http://www.londonglidingclub.co.uk

Map
- Location in Bedfordshire

Runways
Direction	Length		Surface
Direction	ft	m	Surface
	0	0	Grass
	0	0	Grass
	0	0	Grass
	0	0	Grass

The London Gliding Club (LGC) is a members' club whose airfield is located at the foot of the Dunstable Downs. Many privately owned gliders are based there. It has the facilities to train pilots in powerless flight, and in the skills necessary to fly cross country using nature's sources of energy. Aerobatics and instructor training are also available. The LGC is open 364 days a year and is the second largest and one of the oldest Gliding Clubs in the United Kingdom, smaller only than Lasham Gliding Society. The club provides gliding courses, one day courses and trial lessons for members of the public.

In 2024 the restaurant was taken over by For The Love of Food Catering Ltd, operating as the "Fly By Cafe". The caterers offer a large selection of quality food and beverages and are open daily to both the public and to members of the club.

== History ==
The gliding club was formed on 20 February 1930, about a month before the formation of the British Gliding Association. LGC's first flights were made on 16 March 1930 at Stoke Park Farm, near the Guildford works of R.F.Dagnall. They used a German "Zӧgling" primary glider on loan from the BGA and a modified Zӧgling donated by R.F.Dagnall that later become known as the "Dagling". The following weekend training began at the LGC's first permanent site a few miles north of Aldbury near Tring.

By the middle of May 1930, the club had secured the use of Ivinghoe Beacon as a launch site for its gliders, unfortunately the spectacle attracted so much public attention that the club was evicted for "spoiling its peaceful enjoyment by the public"

The club then moved to its current home at the foot of the Dunstable Downs, within the parish boundaries of Totternhoe. This site was chosen because of its favourable position relative to the prevailing westerly winds which allowed hill soaring.

Launching was initially by rubberised "bungee" rope. This was attached to the glider in a Vee shape and then people on each arm of the Vee move forward to stretch the rope, with the glider held back. When the stretch is sufficient, the glider is released and the energy is sufficient for it to get airborne. If this is done at the top of a ridge with the wind blowing up it, the glider then continues soaring rather than just having to land after the bungee launch

Launching was later by winch and aero tow, from the landing field at the bottom of the ridge.

In 1935, the club's wooden hangars were replaced by the present building designed by the renowned architect and club member Kit Nicholson. The LGC soon became one of the biggest gliding clubs in the country. It hosted many national gliding competitions, and many national and world records were set from it. On 22 April 1939 the first soaring flight across the English Channel was made by Geoffrey Stephenson in a Slingsby Gull 1 glider. The launch was by winch and the landing place was Le Wast in France.

During World War II the airfield was taken over by the military and for the duration was used as a prisoner of war camp. Most of the prisoners were Italian with a few Germans. Many of the pre-war LGC members such as Lawrence Wright were to play an important role in the formation of the Glider Pilot Regiment.

== Post war ==
After World War II the airfield was handed back to the LGC and gliding operations resumed. In the post-war years the airfield was expanded as neighbouring fields were purchased, and the gradual replacement of wood and fabric gliders by high performance glass fibre gliders, often constructed using advanced materials such as carbon fibre. These modern gliders required longer take-off and landing areas, and large areas of the airfield were levelled. Bungee launching from the crest of the Downs became less frequent as the aerotow became more viable, and as winch launches were able to achieve greater height. The club training fleet was modernised, and is constantly kept up to date.

As increased performance by modern gliders enabled flights of long distances (up to 1000 km), the London Gliding Club gradually grew in membership throughout these years, and continues to do so. Many UK speed and distance records are held by pilots flying from Dunstable, and the London Gliding Club regularly hosts regional and national competitions.

== Current club fleet ==
=== Gliders ===
- 7 x Schleicher ASK 21
- 3 x Schleicher ASK 23
- Schempp-Hirth Duo Discus
- Schempp-Hirth Discus b
- Schleicher ASW 19
- Rotax Falke SF 25c Motor Glider

=== Tow planes ===
- 4 DR400 Robins
- 1 Piper Pawnee

There is also a Munster Van Gelder Winch with six drums
