= Šoštarić Vrabac =

Serbian glider

Vrabac
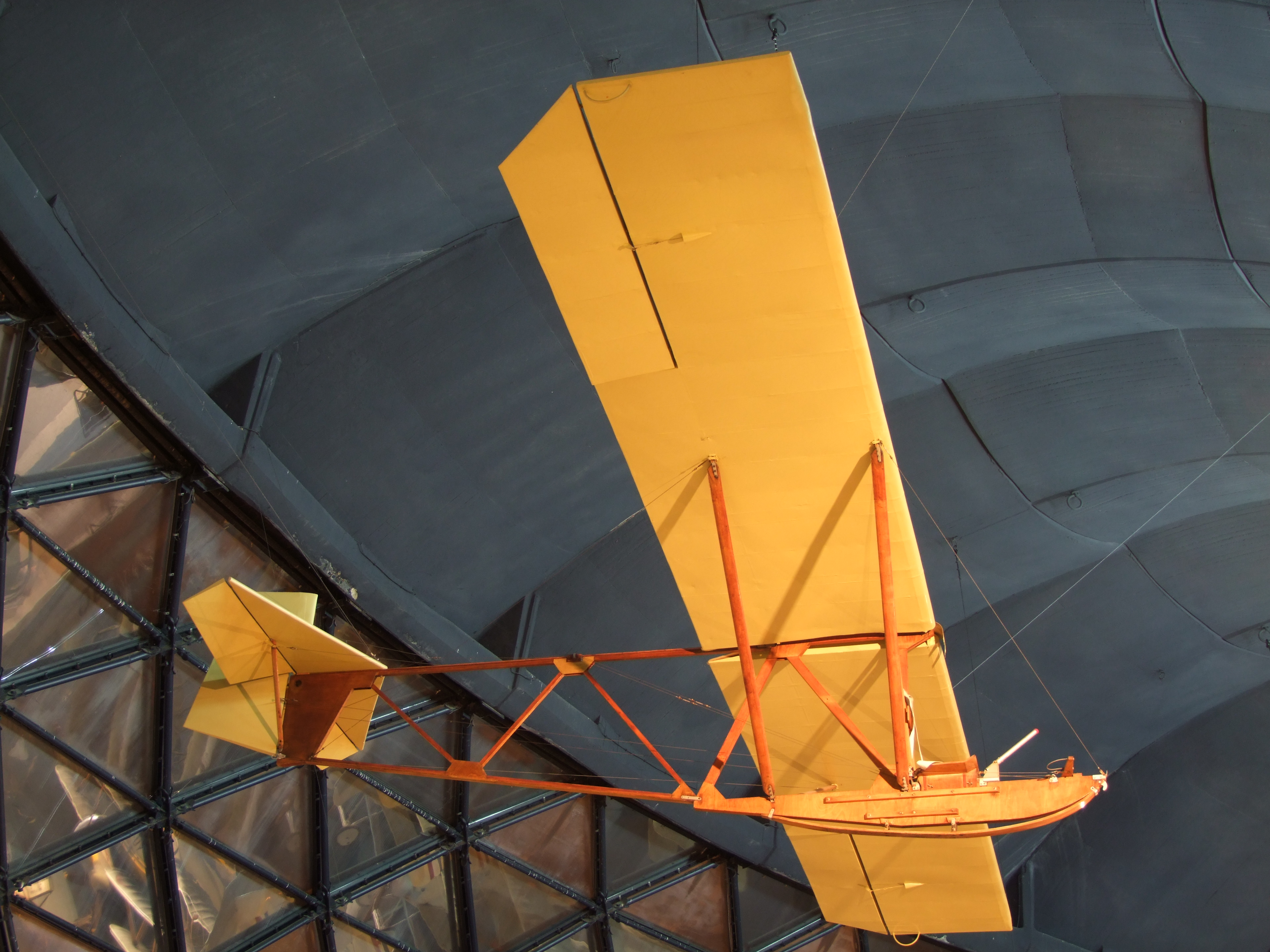
- A Vrabac A, on display at the Aviation Museum - Belgrade.

General information
- Type: Primary glider
- National origin: Kingdom of Yugoslavia
- Manufacturer: Utva
- Designer: Ivo Šoštarić
- Number built: >150

The Šoštarić Vrabac (Serbian: Врабац / Vrabac - sparrow), was a primary glider for basic pilot training designed and built in the Kingdom of Yugoslavia in 1939.

== Design and development ==
Of mixed composition, mostly wood and canvas, with undercarriage skis for landing, the Vrabac was designed by engineer Ivo Šoštarić in 1939, inspired by the success of the Zögling, a German primary glider. Unlike the Zögling, the Vrabac was not wire-braced, lacking a kingpost and using struts to brace the wings to the lower fuselage.

During tests at Vršac the Vrabac showed far better flight characteristics than not only its German exemplar, but also from the Polish Kocjan Wrona.

Production of 15 aircraft in two versions - A and B began in 1939, as the first serially built glider in Serbia. Production continued after World War II and more than 150 were made. Due to the simple design of this glider, it was also made in local aeroclubs' workshops during the winter, so that they could be used for training during the summer.

== Variants ==
Vrabac A
Initial version
Vrabac B
second version

== Aircraft on display ==
- Aviation Museum - Belgrade - a Vrabac A, manufactured in the Utva factory at Pančevo

== Specifications (Vrabac A) ==
Data from

General characteristics

- Length: 6.03 m (19 ft 9 in)
- Wingspan: 10 m (32 ft 10 in)
- Height: 2.15 m (7 ft 1 in)
- Wing area: 15 m^{2} (160 sq ft)
- Aspect ratio: 11.7
- Empty weight: 90 kg (198 lb)
- Gross weight: 170 kg (375 lb)

Performance

- Stall speed: 42.5 km/h (26.4 mph, 22.9 kn)
- Never exceed speed: 70 km/h (43 mph, 38 kn)
- Rate of sink: 1.17 m/s (230 ft/min) at a speed of 47.1 km/h (25 kn)

== See also ==
Related lists

- List of gliders
