= Slingsby Grasshopper =

T.38 Grasshopper
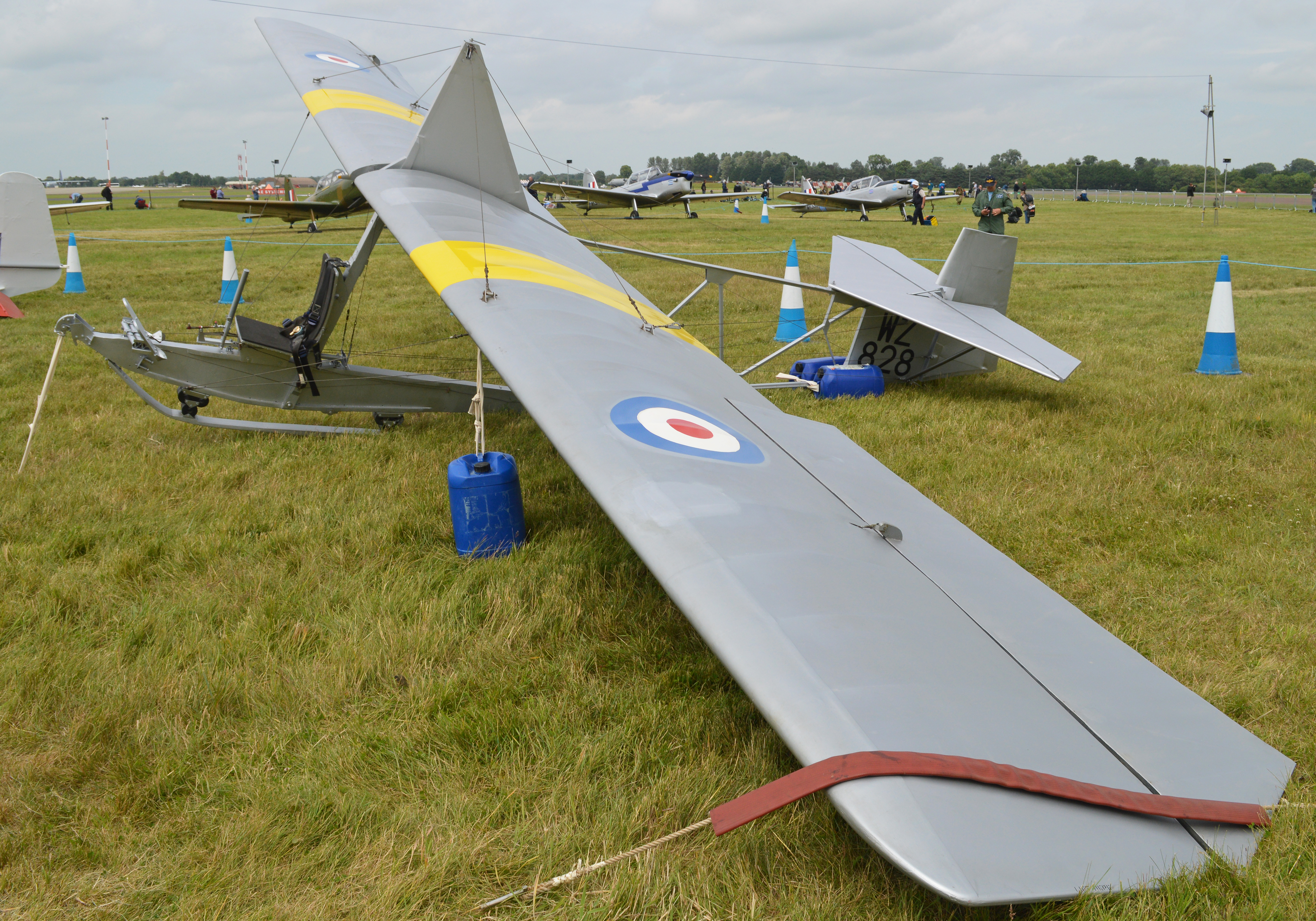

General information
- Type: Primary glider
- Manufacturer: Slingsby Sailplanes Limited
- Primary user: Royal Air Force
- Number built: 115

History
- Introduction date: 1952
- First flight: 1952

The Slingsby T.38 Grasshopper is a British primary training glider built by Slingsby Sailplanes for the Royal Air Force.

== Development ==
The design is based on the pre-World War II German SG 38 Schulgleiter, modified to use the wing design of the Slingsby T.7 Kirby Cadet glider. The design was cheap to manufacture and was designed to be stored dismantled. The type was used by Air Training Corps Squadrons between 1952 and the late 1980s.

The RAF designated the glider the Grasshopper TX.1, and the first order was for 65 aircraft, which were delivered in 1952 and 1953. It was later followed by two further orders for an additional 50 aircraft; the final delivery was made in 1963.

Launch is achieved through the use of a V-shaped bungee or elastic rope pulled by a team of helpers. The glider can also be mounted on a pivoting tripod pointed into wind for the demonstration of controls.

The Grasshopper is virtually identical to the EoN Eton.

== Operators ==
United Kingdom

- Royal Air Force

== Specifications (Grasshopper TX.1) ==
Data from British Gliders and Sailplanes 1922-1970

General characteristics

- Crew: 1
- Length: 20 ft 8 in (6.3 m)
- Wingspan: 39 ft 0 in (11.88 m)
- Height: 8 ft 0 in (2.43 m)
- Wing area: 173.9 sq ft (16.16 m^{2})
- Aspect ratio: 8.73
- Airfoil: Göttingen 426
- Empty weight: 293 lb (132.9 kg)
- Gross weight: 550 lb (249.5 kg)

Performance

- Stall speed: 30 mph (48 km/h, 26 kn)
- Never exceed speed: 80 mph (129 km/h, 70 kn)
- Wing loading: 3.10 lb/sq ft (15.13 kg/m^{2})

== See also ==
- Air Training Corps

Aircraft of comparable role, configuration, and era

- Detroit G1 Gull
- Elliotts Primary EoN
- Jongblood Primary
- Schweizer SGP 1-1

Related lists

- List of aircraft of the Royal Air Force
