= Schweizer SGU 1-2 =

SGU 1-2

General information
- Type: Primary glider
- National origin: United States
- Manufacturer: Mercury Glider Club
- Designer: Ernest Schweizer
- Number built: 1

History
- First flight: 1931

The Schweizer SGU 1-2 was a United States, amateur-built, single-seat, glider that was designed by Ernest Schweizer and constructed by the Mercury Glider Club between 1930 and 1931.

The 1-2 was the second a line of 38 glider designs that the Schweizers created and the first of over 5700 aircraft built by them.

== Design and development ==
The success of the Schweizer SGP 1-1 as a club glider in the summer of 1930 convinced the Schweizers and the Mercury Glider Club to build an improved glider with better performance for the following year.

The 1-2 was flown by the Mercury Glider Club in the summer of 1931. That club later became the Hudson Valley Soaring Club and continued to operate the glider. The HVSC used the 1-2 as a training glider while they used the prototype Schweizer SGU 1-7 for soaring

== Operational history ==
The club named the 1-2 "The Brick", a reference to its low performance. The sole 1-2 built did not survive and there are no examples available today.

The success of the 1-1 and the 1-2 led the Schweizer brothers to continue on to design and build improved gliders, including a single SGU 1-3 the following year and to form the Schweizer Metal Aircraft Company.

== Specifications ==
Data from Schweizer: A History

General characteristics

- Crew: 1
- Length: 22 ft 1 in (6.73 m)
- Wingspan: 40 ft (12 m)
- Wing area: 197 sq ft (18.3 m^{2})
- Aspect ratio: 8.12
- Airfoil: U.S.A. 35A
- Empty weight: 275 lb (125 kg)
- Gross weight: 455 lb (206 kg)

Performance

- Lift-to-drag: 10 (estimated)
- Wing loading: 2.31 lb/sq ft (11.3 kg/m^{2})

== See also ==
Related lists

- List of gliders
