= Slingsby Falcon =

British single-seat glider, 1931

T.1/T.2 Falcon

General information
- Type: Sport Glider
- National origin: United Kingdom
- Manufacturer: Slingsby Sailplanes
- Designer: Alexander Lippisch
- Number built: 11 (1 x T.1 Falcon, 1 x T.2 Falcon 2, 8 x T.1 Falcon, 1 x reproduction)

History
- First flight: 1931
- Developed from: Lippisch Falke
- Variant: Slingsby T.4 Falcon 3

The Slingsby T.1/T.2 Falcon or British Falcon) was a single-seat sport glider produced, in 1931–37, by Fred Slingsby in Scarborough, Yorkshire.

== Design and development ==
The Falcon was constructed from plans supplied by the Rhön-Rossitten Gesellschaft (the controlling body for gliding in Germany). Originally designed by Alexander Lippisch, the T.1 was a single-seat sport glider of moderate performance for its day. The fuselage was primarily of wooden construction with six longerons, built-up frames, plywood skinning forward of the central pylon and fabric covering aft. The parasol wings were conventional in design and construction with built-up ribs and spars, plywood covering forward of the main spars and fabric aft. They were swept at 12.5^{o} but carried ailerons with unswept hinges and rounded trailing edges. The wings were built in two parts joined at the centre, supported by a pylon and a total of eight struts, four vertical from the top longerons and four in vee pairs from the bottom longerons to approx 1/3-span. The tail surfaces were constructed in a similar fashion also braced with struts.

== History ==
Fred Slingsby had noticed the lack of 'Intermediate' gliders available in England. At the recommendation of Guenther Groenhoff he acquired the plans for Lippisch's Falke and built ten aircraft: the Falcon, Falcon 2 and eight further Falcons (a.k.a. British Falcon). These aircraft were flown successfully for many years, but gradually succumbed until none were left airworthy. One was exported to Canada, and one was converted to a flying-boat glider for use by the Air Training Corps on Windermere, surviving to this day in the Windermere Steamboat Museum. During 1984-5 Ken Fripp of Southdown Aero Services at Lasham built a reproduction Falcon from original plans for Mike Russell, bringing the total built to eleven.

== Operators ==
United Kingdom

- Air Training Corps

== Specifications ==
Data from

General characteristics

- Crew: One
- Length: 17 ft 3 in (5.255 m)
- Wingspan: 41 ft 4 in (12.6 m)
- Wing area: 108.9 sq ft (18.48 m^{2})
- Aspect ratio: 11.1
- Airfoil: Göttingen 535
- Empty weight: 308 lb (140 kg)
- Gross weight: 506 lb (230 kg)

Performance

== See also ==
Related lists

- List of gliders
