= Elliotts Primary EoN =

British single-seat glider, 1948

Primary EoN
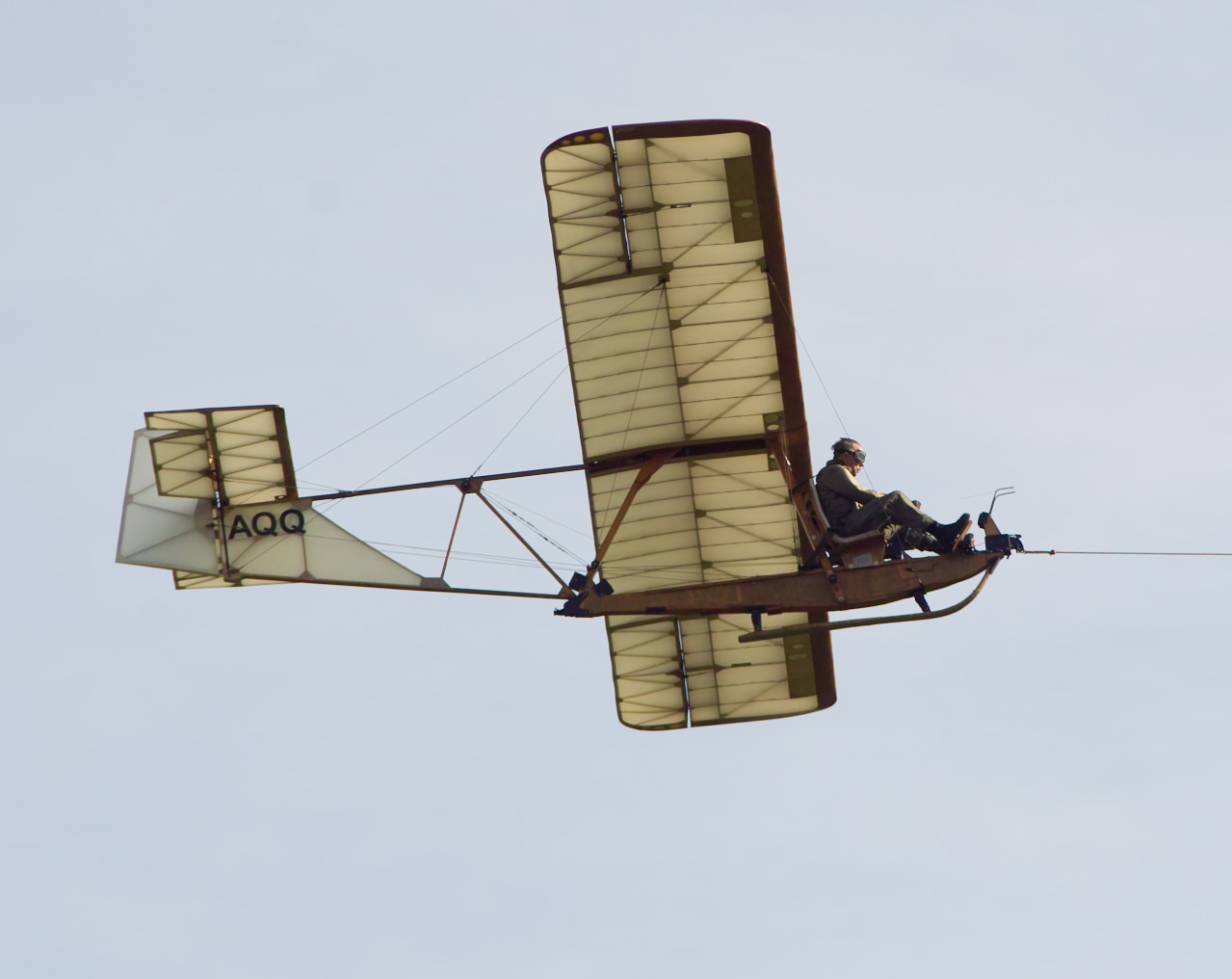

General information
- Type: Training glider
- Manufacturer: Elliotts of Newbury
- Number built: 80

History
- First flight: February 1948

The Elliots Primary EoN or EoN Type 7 S.G.38 Primary was a training glider built in the UK shortly after World War II. It was an absolutely minimalist aircraft, consisting of a high, cable-braced wing connected to a conventional empennage by an open-truss framework, and was a copy of the German SG 38 Schulgleiter. Marketed to aeroclubs, the Primary EoN was also adopted in 1948 by the Air Training Corps and by the Combined Cadet Force under the name Eton TX.1. An example is at the Gliding Heritage Centre.

== Operators ==
United Kingdom

- Royal Air Force
  - Air Training Corps
- Combined Cadet Force

== Specifications ==
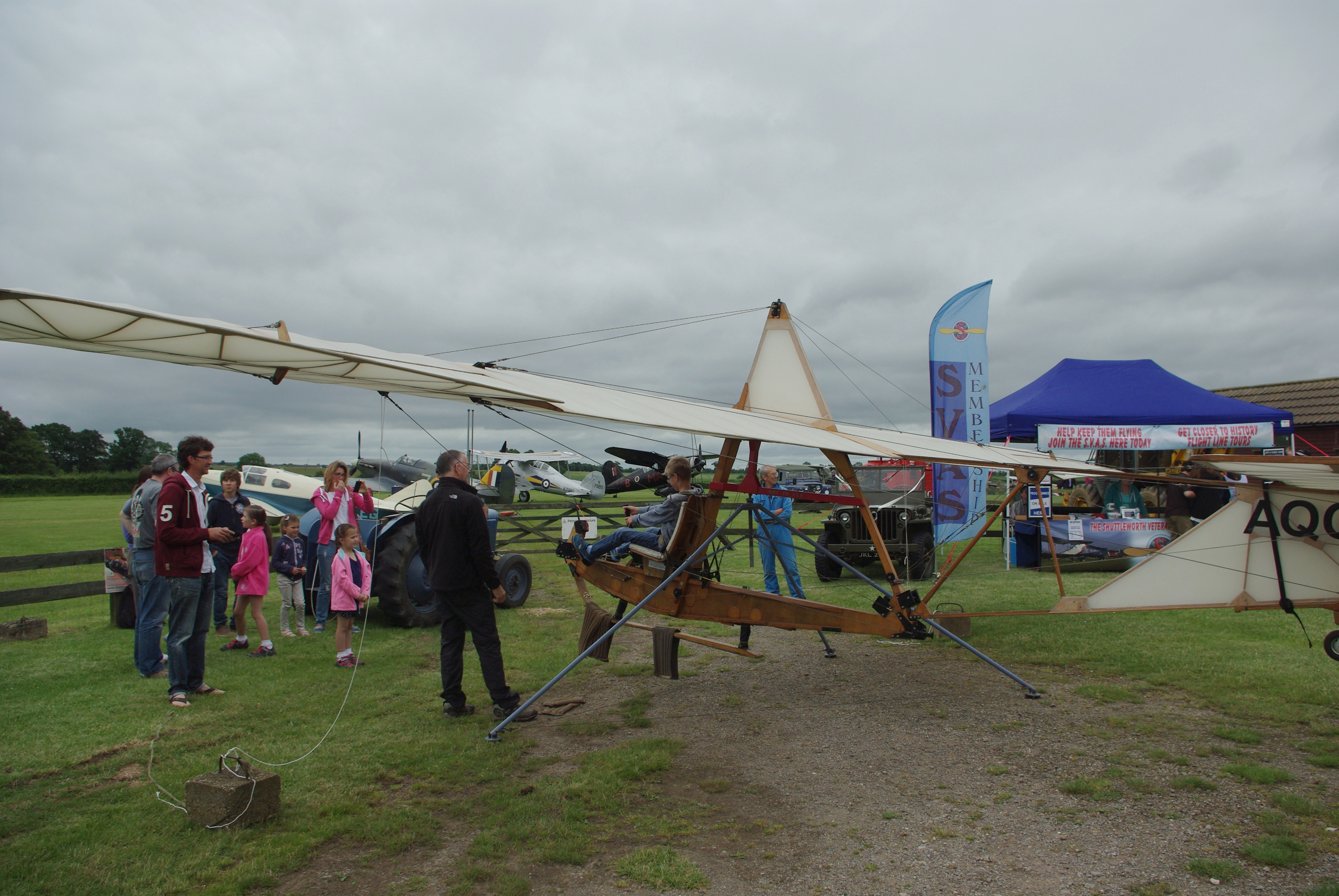
Shuttleworth's Primary, originally an EoN Primary but restored as an S.G.38

Data from Janes's All The World's Aircraft 1965-66

General characteristics

- Crew: 1
- Length: 20 ft 6 in (6.25 m)
- Wingspan: 34 ft 0 in (10.36 m)
- Height: 8 ft 0 in (2.44 m)
- Wing area: 180 sq ft (17 m^{2})
- Aspect ratio: 6:1
- Empty weight: 250 lb (113 kg)
- Max takeoff weight: 490 lb (222 kg)

Performance

- Maximum speed: 73 mph (117 km/h, 63 kn)
- Stall speed: 27 mph (43 km/h, 23 kn)
- Maximum glide ratio: 8

== See also ==
Aircraft of comparable role, configuration, and era

- Detroit G1 Gull
- Jongblood Primary
- Schweizer SGP 1-1
- Slingsby Grasshopper
- Stamer Lippisch SG-38 Zögling

Related lists

- List of gliders
