= Reginald Foster Dagnall =

British engineer and aircraft designer

- Born: Reginald Foster Dagnall; 11 April 1888; Fulham, London, England
- Died: 16 November 1942 (aged 54); Surrey, England
- Education: Tiffin School Kingston upon Thames, Surrey, England
- Occupation: Aircraft engineer
- Known for: Aircraft liferaft

Reginald Foster Dagnall (11 April 1888 – 16 November 1942) was a British engineer and aircraft designer.

== Early life ==
Dagnall was born in Fulham, London in 1888 the son of Walter and Frances Dagnall, he was educated at Tiffin School, Kingston upon Thames. Dagnall started his career in the drawing office of the Thames Ironworks and Shipbuilding Company. He then joined Ernest Willows in developing Willows airships and during the 1914-18 war he was first works manager and then general manager of Airships Limited., a firm which made kite balloons and blimps.

Following the war Dagnall founded his own company, which has since become famous for pneumatic dinghies and barrage balloons. The RFD name is now synonymous with "Rapid Flotation Device" and the supply of marine and aviation safety equipment. He had researched flotation gear of various sorts, and in 1918 he built some of the earliest rubber dinghies. RFD moved to Guildford in 1926 and expanded to Catteshall Lane, Godalming, in 1936 the Godalming factory burnt down and was rebuilt in 1954. In 1959 RFD merged with Perseverance Mill. In 1963 it took over Elliot Equipment and acquired GQ Parachute Company Ltd. It purchased Mills Equipment Company in 1968. In 1970 the three companies merged to form RFD-GQ In 1975 RFD-GQ divided into: - RFD Inflatables Ltd - GQ Parachutes Ltd - RFD Systems Engineering Ltd - RFD Mills Equipment Ltd.

Dagnall was also a director of G.Q. Parachute Co., Ltd., (now part of IRVIN-GQ) which leased space in the RFD works in Guildford. The GQ company operated for many years as a separate organisation until it was absorbed into the RFD Group. In 1942 Dagnall died, aged 54, of heart failure.

== Sailplanes and gliding ==
After World War I, in a small factory at 17 Stoke Road, Guildford, Surrey Dagnall began the manufacture of equipment and gliders. In 1930 he improved on the German Zogling primary glider and marketed it under the name of Dagling. The Dagling was continued in production by the Slingsby glider company as the Slingsby Primary. Dagnall was a keen glider pilot and chairman of the Surrey Gliding Club and its later incarnation the Southern Counties Soaring Club

== Airships ==
The non-rigid airship AD1 (registration G-FAAX) was designed by RFD and built by the Airship Development Company at the Stoke Road works in Guildford. It was taken to the old Cramlington Airship Station near Newcastle and erected in the 1918 airship hangar, with its first flight on 18 September 1929. In May 1930 it performed a number of aerial advertising flights with banners laced to the envelope sides. The original ABC Hornet engine was replaced by a 75 hp Rolls-Royce Hawk in July 1930 for work in Belgium. By mid-1931 it was dismantled and parts sold off by auction on 18 June 1931.

== See also ==
- D-class lifeboat (RFD PB16)
