= Sands Replica 1929 Primary Glider =

American homebuilt glider

Replica 1929 Primary Glider

General information
- Type: Glider
- National origin: United States
- Designer: Ron Sands Sr
- Status: Plans available (2014)
- Number built: 55 (1998)

The Sands Replica 1929 Primary Glider is an American high-wing, wire-braced single-seat, primary glider that was designed by Ron Sands Sr for amateur construction, with kits supplied by Wicks Aircraft Supply. The plans are now sold by Sands' son, Ron Sands Jr.

== Design and development ==
Sands developed his replica 1929-style primary glider from the original designs of that era. He promotes it as "much safer than hang gliders or ultralights... [an] excellent project for school or clubs".

The aircraft is made from wood, tube and doped aircraft fabric. Its 32 ft (9.8 m) span wing is cable-braced from a king post and employs a Clark Y airfoil. Like all primary gliders the cockpit is just a seat mounted on the keel with no windshield fitted. The landing gear is a fixed skid, fitted to the underside of the keel. The aircraft is designed to be bungee launched from a slope or auto-towed. The aircraft can be disassembled for storage or ground transportation.

Sands estimates that construction takes 200 hours. In 2011 plans cost US$40 and included two 24" by 36" (60 X 90 cm) sheets, a materials list and "Safety Tips". In 2015 the available Wicks five part kit totaled US$7644.14.

== Variants ==
Plans for a steel tube fuselage version are also available.

== Specifications (1929 Primary Glider) ==
Data from Purdy, Sands and Wicks

General characteristics

- Crew: one
- Length: 17.67 ft (5.39 m)
- Wingspan: 32 ft (9.8 m)
- Height: 7 ft (2.1 m)
- Wing area: 157 sq ft (14.6 m^{2})
- Airfoil: Clark Y
- Empty weight: 175 lb (79 kg)
- Gross weight: 375 lb (170 kg)

Performance

- Maximum speed: 45 mph (72 km/h, 39 kn)
- Cruise speed: 38 mph (61 km/h, 33 kn)
- Stall speed: 30 mph (48 km/h, 26 kn) clean

== See also ==
Aircraft of comparable role, configuration, and era

- Jongblood Primary - another modern primary glider design

Related lists

- List of gliders
