= Jongblood Primary =

American homebuilt glider

General information
- Type: Glider
- National origin: United States
- Designer: Mike Jongblood
- Status: Sole example reported as "in storage" in 1983
- Number built: One

History
- Introduction date: 1967
- First flight: 1967

The Jongblood Primary is an American single-seat, high-wing, strut-braced primary glider designed by Mike Jongblood of southern California and first flown in 1967. The aircraft is unusual in that primary gliders went out of fashion in the 1930s and few have been built since.

== Design and development ==
Jongblood designed and built this primary glider in 1966, with assistance from Hugh Knoop. The design was original and includes an original airfoil design as well, designated as a Jongblood II section.

The aircraft is built from wood and covered in doped aircraft fabric covering. The glider has a detachable pod to cover the pilot or can be flown open cockpit. It has a constant chord wing with a 4 ft (1.2 m) chord and a 32.5 ft (9.9 m) span. The wing features dual parallel struts and jury struts, but has no spoilers or other glidepath control devices. The tailplane is also strut-braced. Unlike most earlier primary glider designs that land on a fixed skid, this aircraft has a fixed monowheel.

Only one was ever constructed.

== Operational history ==
The Primary had accumulated over 200 auto-tows and seven aerotows, along with nine hours of flying time, by the end of 1968 and by 1983 had flown 22 hours total. It had flown a single three-hour flight and had recorded a height gain of 8,000 ft (2,438 m).

By 1983 the aircraft was reported as being in storage. In May 2011 it was still on the Federal Aviation Administration registry listings, although its registration had expired on 31 March 2011.

== Specifications (Jongblood Primary) ==
Data from Soaring

General characteristics

- Crew: one
- Wingspan: 32 ft 6 in (9.91 m)
- Wing area: 125 sq ft (11.6 m^{2})
- Aspect ratio: 8:1
- Airfoil: Jongblood II
- Empty weight: 270 lb (122 kg)
- Gross weight: 450 lb (204 kg)

Performance

- Maximum glide ratio: 8:1 at 30 mph (48 km/h)

== See also ==
Aircraft of comparable role, configuration, and era

- Detroit G1 Gull
- Elliotts Primary EoN
- Sands Replica 1929 Primary Glider
- Schweizer SGP 1-1
- Slingsby Grasshopper
- Stamer Lippisch SG-38 Zögling

Related lists

- List of gliders
