= Slingsby Falcon III =

British two-seat training glider, 1935

T.4 Falcon 3
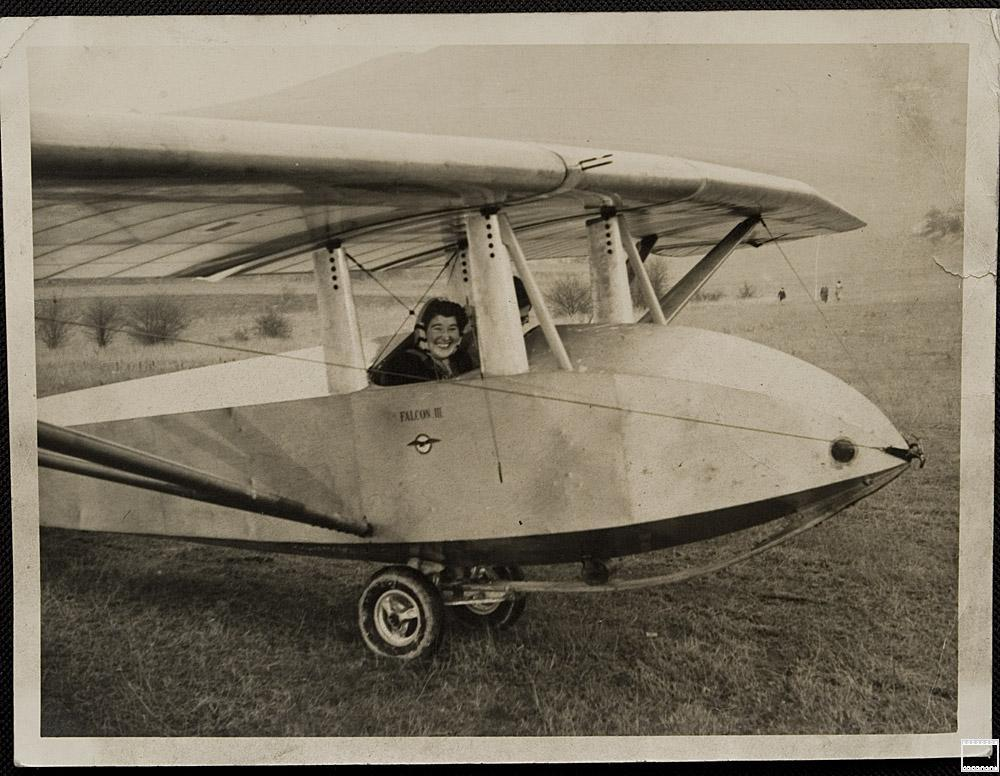

General information
- Type: Primary Training Glider
- National origin: United Kingdom
- Manufacturer: Slingsby Sailplanes
- Designer: Fred Slingsby
- Number built: 9

History
- First flight: 1935
- Developed from: Slingsby Falcon 2

The Slingsby T.4 Falcon 3 was a two-seat training glider produced from 1935, by Fred Slingsby in Kirbymoorside, Yorkshire.

== Design and development ==
Espin Hardwick persuaded Fred Slingsby to build a two-seat version of the Falcon. Slingsby enlarged the fuselage to accept side by side seating for pupil and instructor, and enlarged the aircraft to cope with the increased weight. The increased span wings were attached to a rectangular centre-section which was supported by six struts. To increase the field of vision the centre section had celluloid panels and the wing root fairing strips were made from a clear plastic, both of these vision aids tended to have short lives, and were usually replaced with doped fabric or plywood as appropriate.

== History ==
After successful flight tests with only minor modifications, the Falcon 3 was put into production. Eight more were built, but didn't see as much use as trainers as they should have, due to the short-sighted prevailing opinion that trainee pilots gained more from having to master gliders with poor flying characteristics. Production halted by 1938 and most of the Falcon 3's were impressed for use by the Air Training Corps

== Operators ==
UK

- Air Training Corps

== Specifications ==
General characteristics

- Crew: Two
- Length: 22 ft 1 in (6.74 m)
- Wingspan: 58 ft 0 in (17.69 m)
- Wing area: 294.8 sq ft (27.4 m^{2})
- Aspect ratio: 11.1
- Airfoil: Göttingen 535
- Empty weight: 500 lb (227 kg)
- Gross weight: 899 lb (408 kg)

Performance

== See also ==
- Slingsby Falcon 2

Aircraft of comparable role, configuration, and era

- Slingsby T.21 Sedbergh

Related lists

- List of gliders
