= Primary glider =

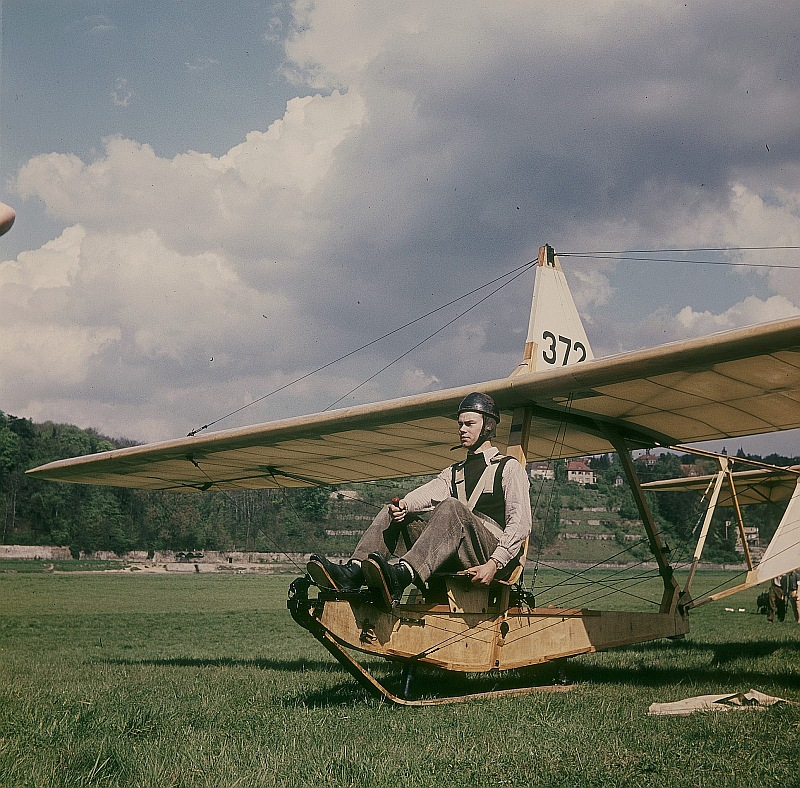
DFS SG 38 Schulgleiter primary glider

Primary gliders are a category of aircraft that enjoyed worldwide popularity during the 1920s and 1930s as people strove for simple and inexpensive ways to learn to fly.

Constructed of wood, metal cables and cloth, primary gliders were very light and easy to fly. They generally had no cockpit and no instruments.

== Operations ==
Primary gliders were generally launched by bungee cord, whereby a rubber rope was arranged in a "V" with the glider at the apex. The ends of the rope were pulled by hand to launch the glider from a slope. Primaries were also launched by auto-tow and auto-bungee tow. Ramp launching from cliffs was also attempted successfully.

== Modern primaries ==
Modern versions of primary gliders are still built, but, while they are much like the originals in appearance, they are usually constructed with composites and safety enhancements.

== Types ==
Examples include:

- Bonomi BS.16 Allievo Bonomi
- Cessna CG-2
- Cloudcraft Dickson Primary
- Detroit G1 Gull
- DFS SG 38 Schulgleiter
- Elliotts Primary EoN
- Jongblood Primary
- Manuel VI Primary
- Payne I.C.1
- Reynard R.4 Primary
- Sands Replica 1929 Primary Glider
- Schweizer SGP 1-1
- Slingsby Grasshopper
- Slingsby Primary
- Šoštarić Vrabac
- Stamer Lippisch Zögling
- Warsztaty Szybowcowe Wrona
