= Slingsby Primary =

T.3 Dagling
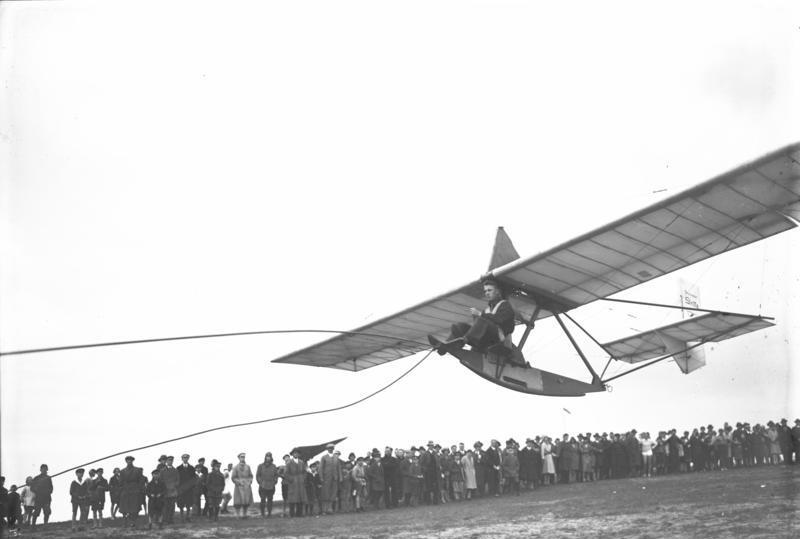
- Original RRG Zögling 1931.

General information
- Type: Primary training glider
- National origin: United Kingdom
- Manufacturer: Slingsby Sailplanes
- Designer: Reginald Foster Dagnall
- Number built: at least 67 (by Slingsby)

History
- Developed from: Lippisch Zögling

The Slingsby T.3 Primary (a.k.a. Dagling) was a single-seat training glider produced in the 1930s by Fred Slingsby in Kirbymoorside, Yorkshire.

== Design and development ==
During the 1920s Alexander Lippisch designed a training glider with very low performance to introduce pilots gradually to full-blown gliding. The result was a glider with a very simple structure of an open framework fuselage, with short wings attached by cables to a king post and the base of the fuselage. Lippisch's original design, the Zögling (Pupil in English) had an all-wood fuselage but Wolf Hirth instigated a redesign of the rear fuselage using steel tubes.

== History ==
The plans for the modified Zögling made their way via the United States to the London Gliding Club and Reginald Foster Dagnall, whose RFD company put it into production as the RFD Primary. They built 27 in 1930–31. The type became known as the Dagling, a name formed by combining Dagnall and Zögling, which later came to be used informally to cover all types of primary gliders in the UK. Fred Slingsby took over construction in 1934 and production continued up to the outbreak of World War II. The Primary should not be confused with the similar T.38 Grasshopper which was produced for the Air Training Corps in the 1950s.

== Variants ==
Slingsby T.3 Primary
Derived from the Wolf Hirth-modified Zögling
RFD Primary Type AT
Production of the Primary by the R.F.D. Co, named Dagling from a contraction of Dagnall and Zögling.
Hawkridge Dagling
A modified Dagnall built post-World War II by the Hawkridge Aircraft Co.

== Specifications ==
General characteristics

- Crew: One
- Length: 17 ft 10 in (5.447 m)
- Wingspan: 34 ft 4 in (10.35 m)
- Wing area: 162 sq ft (15.06 m^{2})
- Aspect ratio: 11.1
- Airfoil: Göttingen 326
- Empty weight: 180 lb (82 kg)
- Gross weight: 380 lb (173 kg)

Performance

== See also ==
Related development

- Zögling

Aircraft of comparable role, configuration, and era

- Slingsby T.38 Grasshopper

Related lists

- List of gliders
