= Schweizer SGP 1-1 =

SGP 1-1
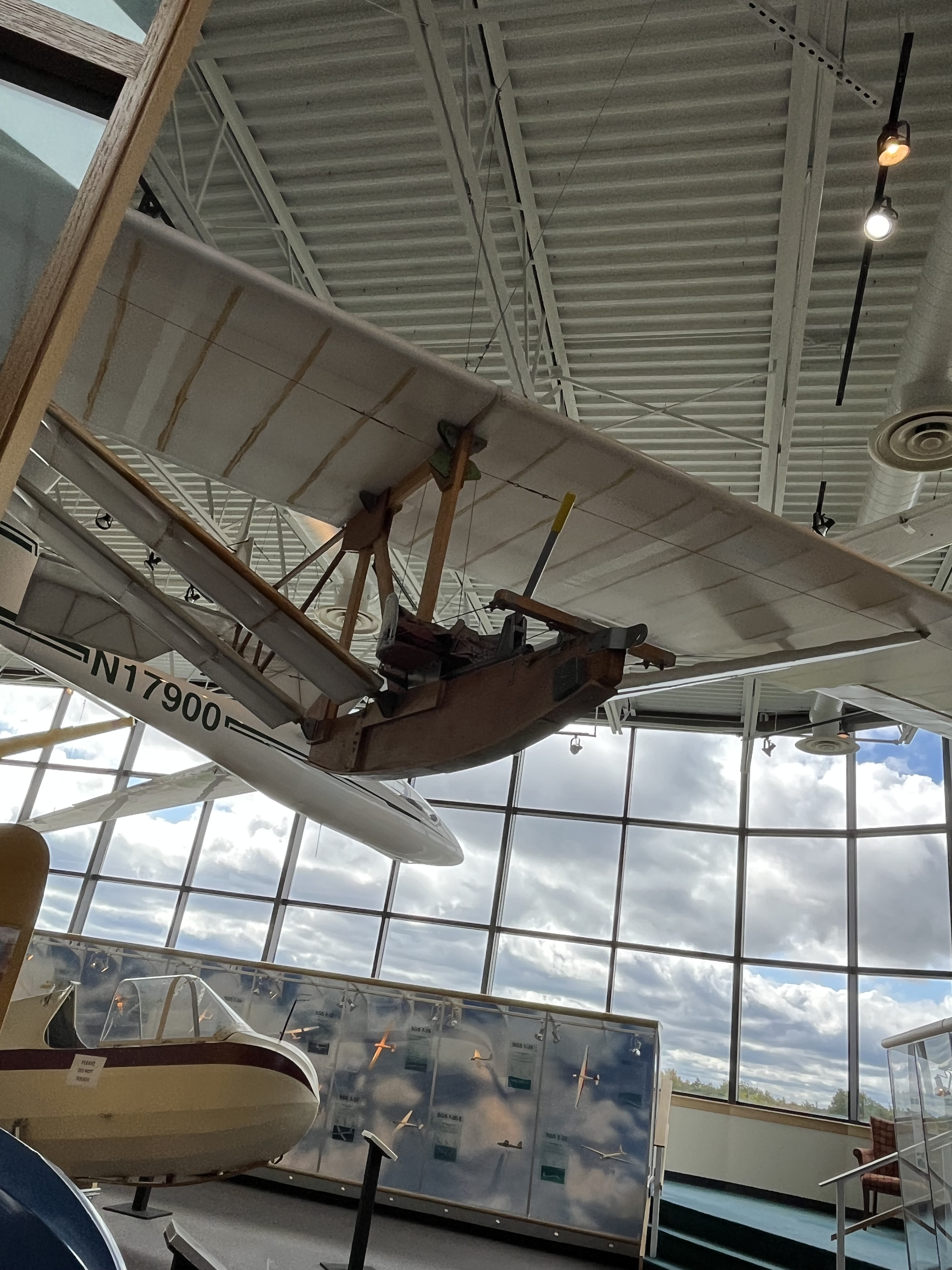
- Schweizer SGP 1-1 at the National Soaring Museum

General information
- Type: Primary glider
- National origin: United States
- Manufacturer: Mercury Glider Club
- Designer: Ernest Schweizer
- Number built: 2 (including 1989 replica)

History
- First flight: 19 June 1930

The Schweizer SGP 1-1 is an American, amateur-built, single-seat, high-wing primary glider that was designed by Ernest Schweizer and constructed by the Mercury Glider Club between 1929 and 1930.

The 1-1 became the first in a line of 38 glider designs that the Schweizers created and the first of over 5700 aircraft built by them.

A replica of the original 1-1 was constructed by a group of volunteers led by Ernst Schweizer in 1989 to celebrate 50 years of Schweizer sailplane construction.

The SGP 1-1 has also been referred to as the SGU 1-1.

== Design and development ==
In 1928 J.C. Penney III, son of founder of the J. C. Penney department store chain, provided financial backing for a glider pilot training school run by the American Motorless Aviation Corporation. In order to gain publicity AMAC sponsored some soaring flights at Corn Hill, Truro, Massachusetts, Highland Light, Massachusetts and South Wellfleet, Massachusetts on Cape Cod. AMAC's chief pilot, Peter Hesselbach made the first flight on 28 July 1928 in the Darmstadt I glider. This flight was of 57 minutes duration and bettered Orville Wright's record duration flight by a factor of five. Hesselbach flew again on 31 July 1928 from Corn Hill, Massachusetts and flew for more than four hours, soaring in the winds that flowed up over the dunes. This flight was given front-page coverage in the New York Times.

The New York Times story greatly impressed the members of the Mercury Model Airplane Club including Atlee Hauck, Ernie Whidden, Robert Yellow and brothers Paul, Ernest and Bill Schweizer. As a result, they decided to convert the model club to a gliding club and build a primary glider. The club charged a US$5 membership fee. This rather substantial amount caused only those serious about glider flying to remain to build the aircraft, led by the Schweizer brothers.

Ernst Schweizer designed the then-unnamed primary glider, drawing inspiration from photographs of German designs then in use. The teenagers estimated that the glider would cost US$100 to complete and saved their busfare money by walking to and from school. They were not permitted to own bicycles or to hitchhike, as their father considered those methods of transportation too dangerous. They hid the glider construction project from him, even though it was built in the Schweizer's barn.

The glider was built with a wooden structure and steel fittings. The wings and tail surfaces were covered in fabric. Typical of the primary gliders of its day, the fuselage was open and featured an open seat with stick and rudder three-axis controls. The aircraft was designed to be bungee launched with an elastic shock cord and had a single skid for landing gear.

Ernest Schweizer recognized the need to ensure that the glider was designed properly and so, even though he was still in high school, he conducted a stress analysis of the design.

The Schweizer brothers were concerned that their father might not let them fly the glider when it was completed and so they built it in secret. Their father worked in New York City during the week and would only enter his barn on weekends. The glider was constructed during weekdays and dismantled and hidden on the weekends. At the point in construction when the aircraft parts had become too large to hide, the brothers decided to assemble the aircraft as far as they could and show their father. He saw that they had done too much work to be stopped at that point and did not object to the completion of the glider.

The glider first flew on 19 June 1930, when Ernest Schweizer was 18 years old, Paul was 17 and Bill was 12. The final cost of the aircraft was US$135.

The success of the 1-1 led the Schweizer brothers to continue on to design the Schweizer SGU 1-2 and to form the Schweizer Metal Aircraft Company.

== Operational history ==
The club members taught themselves to fly using the glider launched by shock cord. They enlisted the aid of local children to pull the shock cord, but after the novelty appeal wore off, they had difficulties finding sufficient people for bungee launching. They switched to auto-tow using a Ford Model A to pull the shock cord. This method allowed higher flights.

The SGP 1-1 was flown extensively during the summer of 1930, although the total flying time for the year was less than one hour.

== Aircraft on display ==
A replica of the original 1-1 was constructed by a group of Schweizer Aircraft volunteers under the direction of Ernst Schweizer. The glider was completed, registered as N50SZ and flown in 1989 to celebrate 50 years of Schweizer sailplanes. The aircraft was flown by each of the Schweizer brothers and was donated to the National Soaring Museum where it remains on display.

== Specifications ==
General characteristics

- Crew: One
- Length: 15 ft 0 in (4.6 m)
- Wingspan: 32 ft 0 in (9.8 m)
- Aspect ratio: 8
- Airfoil: Clark Y

== See also ==
Aircraft of comparable role, configuration, and era

- Detroit G1 Gull
- Elliotts Primary EoN
- Jongblood Primary
- Stamer Lippisch SG-38 Zögling

Related lists

- List of gliders
