= Detroit G1 Gull =

American training glider

G1 Gull
- G1 Gull on tow

General information
- Type: Primary glider
- National origin: United States
- Manufacturer: Detroit Aircraft Corporation
- Status: No longer in production
- Number built: At least three

History
- Introduction date: circa 1930s
- First flight: 1925

The Detroit G1 Gull is an American high wing, cable-braced primary glider that was manufactured by the Detroit Aircraft Corporation during the Great Depression. It first flew in 1925.

The aircraft's correct designation is not clear. Soaring Magazine calls it the Detroit Gull G1 Primary, while the two Federal Aviation Administration registered aircraft are simply Detroit Gulls. Henley's ABC of Gliding and Sailflying also calls it the Detroit Gull.

== Design and development ==
The Gull G1 was developed by Detroit Aircraft as an inexpensive aircraft for the Depression. Detroit Aircraft later sold the rights to Stone Aircraft, who sold plans for the aircraft for amateur construction.

The Gull is built from wood, with the tail and wing surfaces covered in doped aircraft fabric. The wing is cable braced from a kingpost. The fuselage consists of a simple structure to which the seat is attached. The pilot sits on the completely open seat, with no windshield. Controls are conventional three-axis. The landing gear consists of the bottom of the fuselage shaped into a long wooden skid . Sometimes two small wheels were attached.

The Gull was reportedly type certified, but no record of the type certificate is on file with the Federal Aviation Administration.

== Operational history ==
One Gull was started before the Second World War by Peter Eyrud of Walla Walla, Washington, but not completed. This aircraft was purchased by Peter M. Bowers who completed and flew it. Bowers documented the aircraft project in an article in the March/April 1957 edition of Soaring Magazine entitled Don't Build a Primary.

In 1983 two other Gulls were reported to be in storage awaiting restoration.

In May 2011 there were two G1 Gulls registered with the Federal Aviation Administration in the USA. One was in the Kansas Aviation Museum and the other was still registered to Peter M. Bowers, even though he died in April 2003. Soaring Magazine reports that this aircraft too is actually in an unnamed aviation museum.

In August, 2013 one was put on display at the W.L Zimmerman's Hardware Store, Intercourse, Pennsylvania. This glider has been preserved in original condition from 1931.

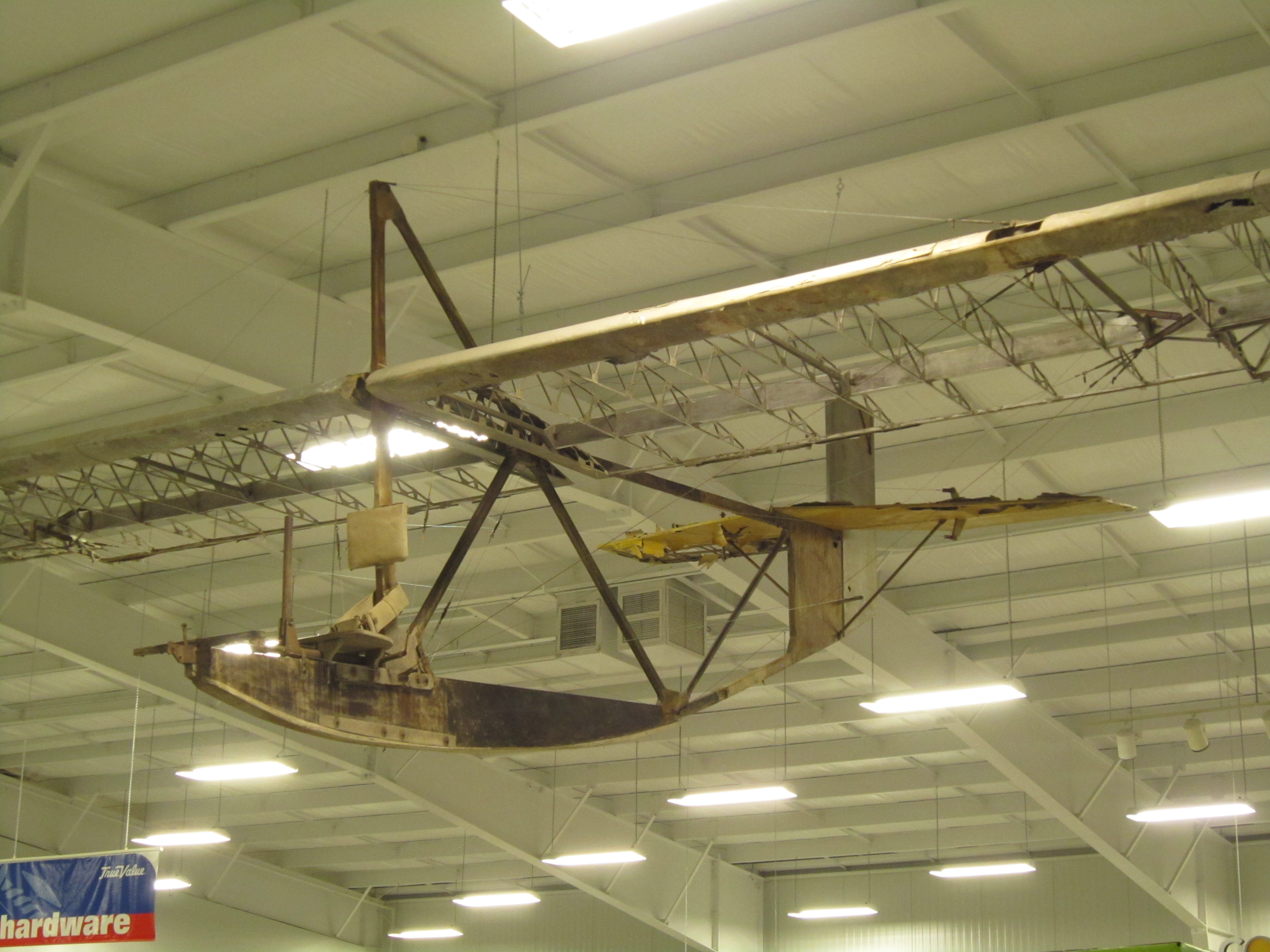
G1 Glider on display

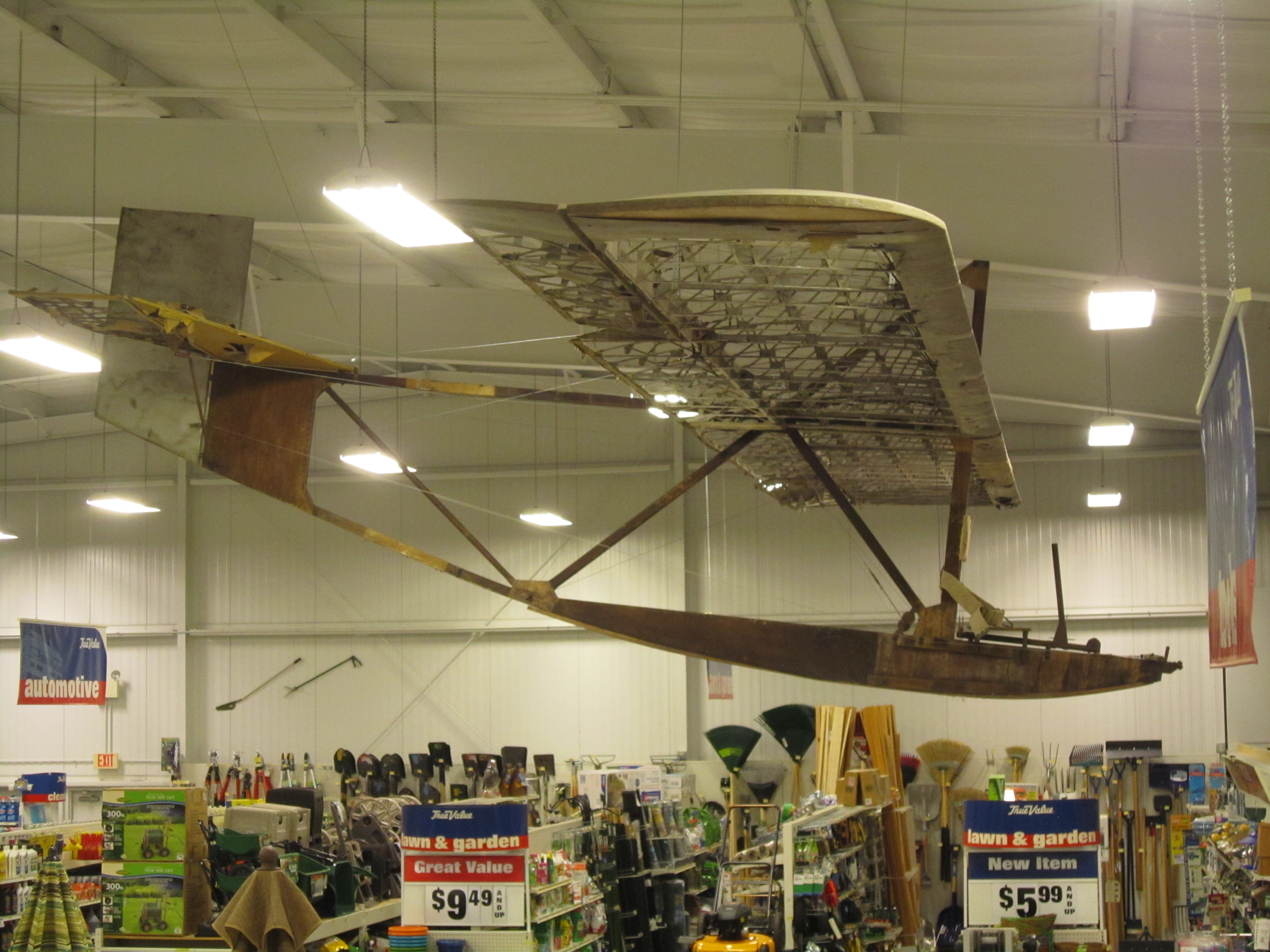
G1 Glider on display

== Aircraft on display ==
- Kansas Aviation Museum
- W.L Zimmerman and Sons Hardware Store, Intercourse, Pennsylvania

== Specifications (G1) ==
Data from Soaring and Henley

General characteristics

- Crew: one
- Length: 17.5 ft (5.3 m)
- Wingspan: 34.5 ft (10.5 m)
- Height: 7.0 ft (2.1 m)
- Wing area: 170 sq ft (16 m^{2})
- Aspect ratio: 7:1
- Airfoil: USA 35
- Empty weight: 200 lb (91 kg)
- Gross weight: 400 lb (181 kg)

Performance

- Never exceed speed: 103 mph (166 km/h, 90 kn)
- Maximum glide ratio: 8:1 at 30 mph (48 km/h)
- Wing loading: 2.36 lb/sq ft (11.5 kg/m^{2})

== See also ==
Aircraft of comparable role, configuration, and era

- Elliotts Primary EoN
- Jongblood Primary
- Schweizer SGP 1-1
- Stamer Lippisch SG-38 Zögling

Related lists

- List of gliders
