= DFS Zögling =

German single-seat glider, 1926

Zögling
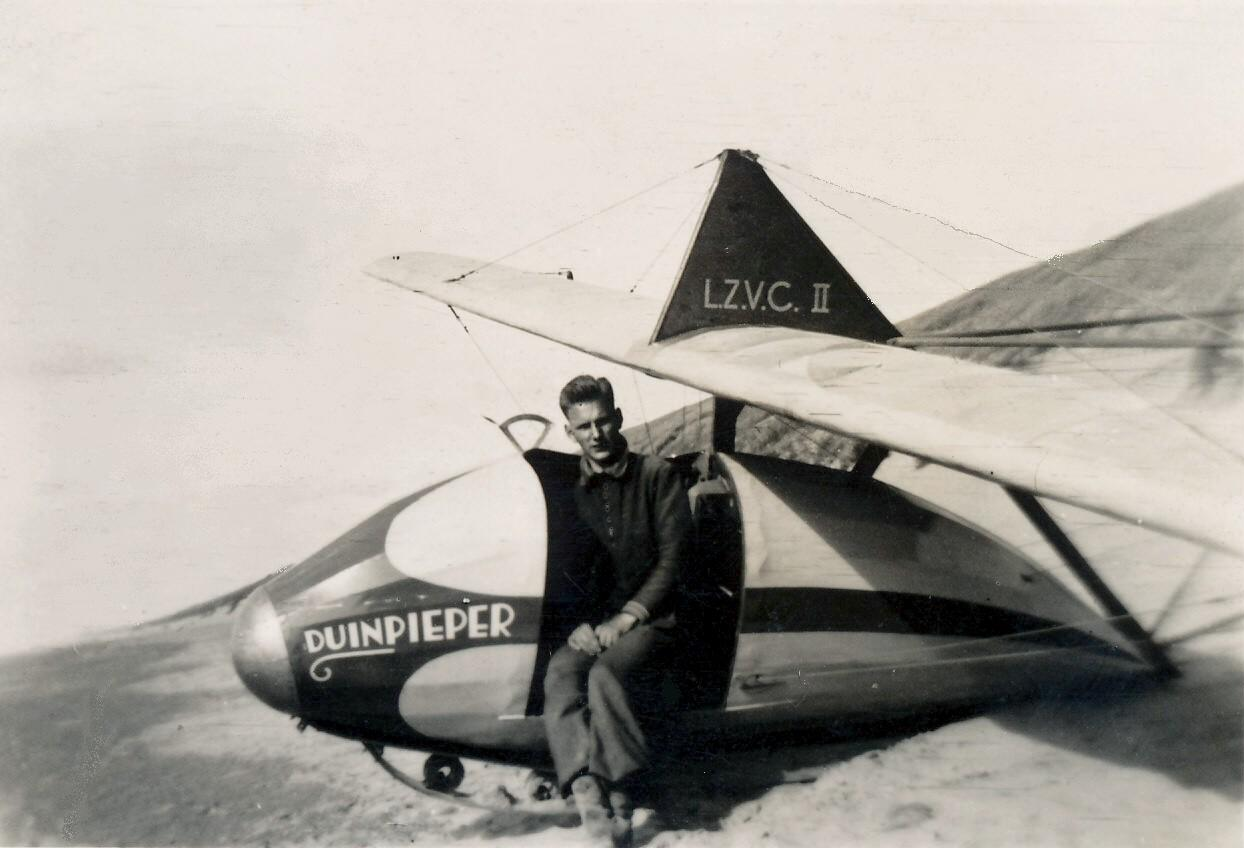
- R.R.G. Zögling (PH-77) with a cockpit fairing fitted

General information
- Type: Glider
- National origin: Germany
- Designer: Alexander Lippisch
- Status: No longer in production

History
- Introduction date: 1926
- First flight: 1926

The Zögling (English: pupil) is a German high-wing, cable-braced, single seat primary glider that was designed by Alexander Lippisch in 1926 and produced with many variations by a variety of manufacturers.

== Design and development ==
The Zögling was designed to be a training glider for basic flight training. The usual launch method was by bungee cord from a sloped hill. Because training was conducted solely by solo flight the aircraft had to be very easy to fly and also easy to repair.

The high-wing design uses a kingpost and cable bracing. The primary structure of the glider is of wood, with the wings, tail surfaces and inverted "V" kingpost all finished in doped aircraft fabric covering. The pilot sits on a simple seat in the open air, without a windshield.

== Variants ==
D.D. Zögling
RRG-1 Zögling
DFS Zögling 33
DFS Zögling 1
Lippisch Zögling
Teichfuss L.T.30
G 101
production in Sweden
Kegel Zögling
copies or licence production by Kegel-Flugzeugbau Kassel, using the 'AK' logo on the King-post.
EAY-101
license production by Empresa Aeronáutica Ypiranga; six built

== Aircraft on display ==
- National Soaring Museum, Elmira, New York, United States
- US Southwest Soaring Museum – replica fuselage only

== Specifications (Zögling) ==
Data from Planeurs - Zögling and The Virtual Aviation Museum

General characteristics

- Crew: one
- Length: 5.290 m (17 ft 4 in)
- Wingspan: 10.040 m (32 ft 11 in)
- Height: 2.010 m (6 ft 7 in)
- Wing area: 15.85 m^{2} (170.6 sq ft)
- Airfoil: Göttingen 358
- Empty weight: 85 kg (187 lb)
- Max takeoff weight: 155 kg (342 lb)
- Wing loading: 9.8 kg/m^{2} (2.0 lb/sq ft)

== See also ==
Related development

- DFS SG 38 Schulgleiter
- Slingsby Primary

Aircraft of comparable role, configuration, and era

- Detroit G1 Gull
- Jongblood Primary
- Schweizer SGP 1-1
- Cloudcraft Dickson Primary

Related lists

- List of gliders
