= Church of St Leonard the Less, Samlesbury =

Coordinates: 53.7680°N 2.6237°W

St Leonard the Less, Samlesbury
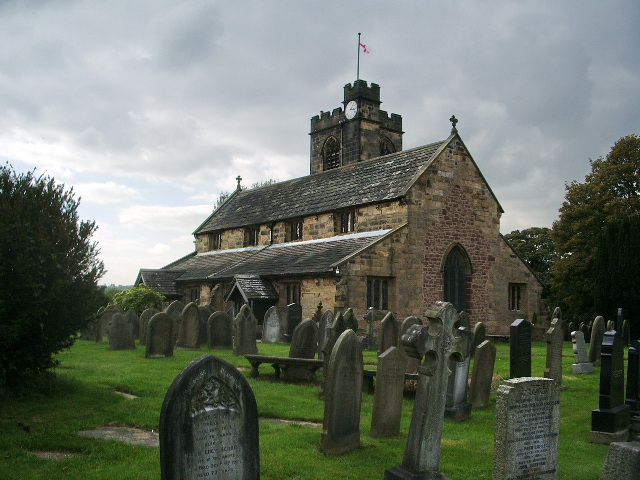

- Location in the Borough of South Ribble
- Location: Samlesbury, Lancashire
- Denomination: Anglican

Architecture
- Functional status: Active
- Heritage designation: Grade I
- Designated: 11 November 1966

Administration
- Province: York
- Diocese: Blackburn
- Archdeaconry: Blackburn
- Deanery: Leyland

The Church of St Leonard the Less is an Anglican church in the village of Samlesbury, Lancashire, England, situated close to the banks of the River Ribble. It is an active parish church in the Diocese of Blackburn. It dates predominantly from 1558, with a tower added 1899–1900, and is protected as a Grade I listed building.

== History ==
There has been a church (or chapel) on the site since the 12th century, traces of which can be seen in the present structure. The chapel may have been rebuilt in the 14th century. It was substantially rebuilt in 1558, by Edward Stanley, 3rd Earl of Derby and was restored in 1885. The tower was added in 1899–1900 by James Bertwistle of Blackburn. The church was designated a Grade I listed building on 11 November 1966.

== Architecture ==
=== Exterior ===
St Leonard's is constructed of yellow sandstone, with older parts in red sandstone, and stone slate roofs. Its plan consists of a clerestoried nave and chancel under one roof with aisles to the north and south, and a tower to the north-west. The 19th century east window is a three lights window with a pointed head. The west window (perhaps also 19th century) has a pointed arch with three pointed lights and crossed mullions. Most of the remaining windows are square-headed with three rounded lights.

The tower is ashlar. It has diagonal buttresses and a crenellated parapet. It has a turret with a spiral staircase. There is a clock on the west wall and belfry louvres on all walls.

=== Interior and fittings ===
Together, the nave and chancel measure 66 feet (20 m) by 18 feet 6 inches (5.64 m). The internal walls, rough coursed masonry, were plastered at one time, but this was removed in the 19th century. There is a piscina in the south wall of the sanctuary. The arcades have four bays with pointed arches. The piers are octagonal. At the west end of the south aisle is a baptistery, concealed by an oak screen.

There are elaborate box pews from the 16th and 17th centuries, the earliest from 1678. The double-decker pulpit is in the north end of the nave. There is funerary armour dating from 1546 of Thomas Southworth of Samlesbury Hall.

=== Churchyard ===
There is a sundial a few feet south-east of the church, with a plate that dates from 1742. It has been given a Grade II designation by English Heritage. A stone font was removed from the church and now sits in the churchyard. It is inscribed with "TW 1769". It has also received a Grade II designation. The churchyard contains war graves of three soldiers of World War I.

== See also ==
- Grade I listed buildings in Lancashire
- Listed buildings in Samlesbury
