= Edgar Percival Aircraft =

British aircraft manufacturer, 1954–1958

Edgar Percival Aircraft Limited
- Type: Aircraft manufacturer
- Industry: Aviation
- Predecessor: Percival Aircraft Company
- Founded: 1954 in Stapleford, England
- Founder: Edgar Percival
- Defunct: 1958
- Fate: Acquired by Samlesbury Engineering Ltd Limited
- Successor: Lancashire Aircraft Company Limited
- Headquarters: Stapleford, England
- Products: Edgar Percival E.P.9

Edgar Percival Aircraft Limited was a British aircraft manufacturer from 1954 to 1958. The company was based at Stapleford Aerodrome, England.

== History ==
In 1954, Edgar Percival formed Edgar Percival Aircraft Limited a few years after his original company the Percival Aircraft Company had become part of the Hunting Group. His first new design was Edgar Percival E.P.9 which was a utility aircraft designed for agricultural use.

In 1958 Samlesbury Engineering Ltd Limited acquired rights to the design and the company formed a subsidiary named the Lancashire Aircraft Company Limited.

== Aircraft ==
- Edgar Percival E.P.9
