= Samlesbury =

Village in Lancashire, England

Coordinates: 53.768°N 2.621°W

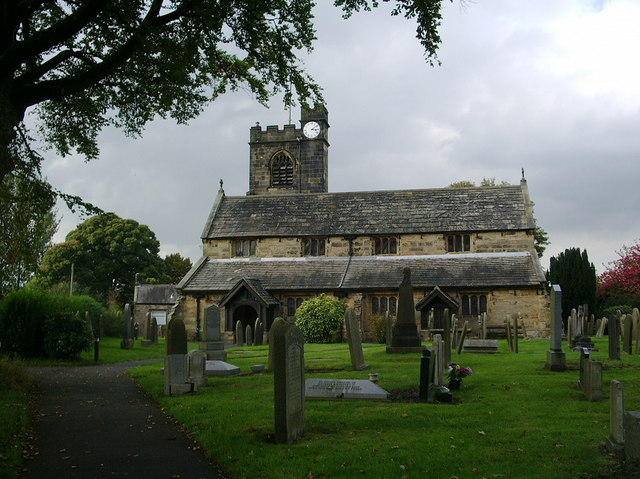
- Parish church of St Leonard the Less

- Shown within South Ribble Location within Lancashire
- Population: 1,206 (2011)
- OS grid reference: SD590303
- Civil parish: Samlesbury
- District: South Ribble
- Shire county: Lancashire
- Region: North West
- Country: England
- Sovereign state: United Kingdom
- Post town: PRESTON
- Postcode district: PR5
- Dialling code: 01772
- Police: Lancashire
- Fire: Lancashire
- Ambulance: North West
- UK Parliament: Ribble Valley

Samlesbury (/ˈsɑːmzbəri/ or locally /ˈsæmlzbri/) is a village and civil parish in South Ribble, Lancashire, England. Samlesbury Hall, a historic house, is in the village, as is Samlesbury Aerodrome and a large modern brewery owned by Anheuser-Busch InBev. The population at the 2011 census was 1,206.

== History ==
The village's name is derived from the Old English sceamol, meaning ledge and burh meaning fortification, hence literally "ledge fortification". It may also be that the name at least partly derives from the Roman name for the River Ribble and its eponymous Celtic deity, Belisama.

In the Late Middle Ages a fortified house stood near the river, the home of the Denyas family. It was destroyed by the Scots during The Great Raid of 1322. An heiress, Alicia Denyas, married Gilbert de Southworth, the builder of Samlesbury Hall.

The parish was part of Preston Rural District throughout its existence from 1894 to 1974. In 1974 the parish became part of South Ribble.

== Samlesbury Hall ==
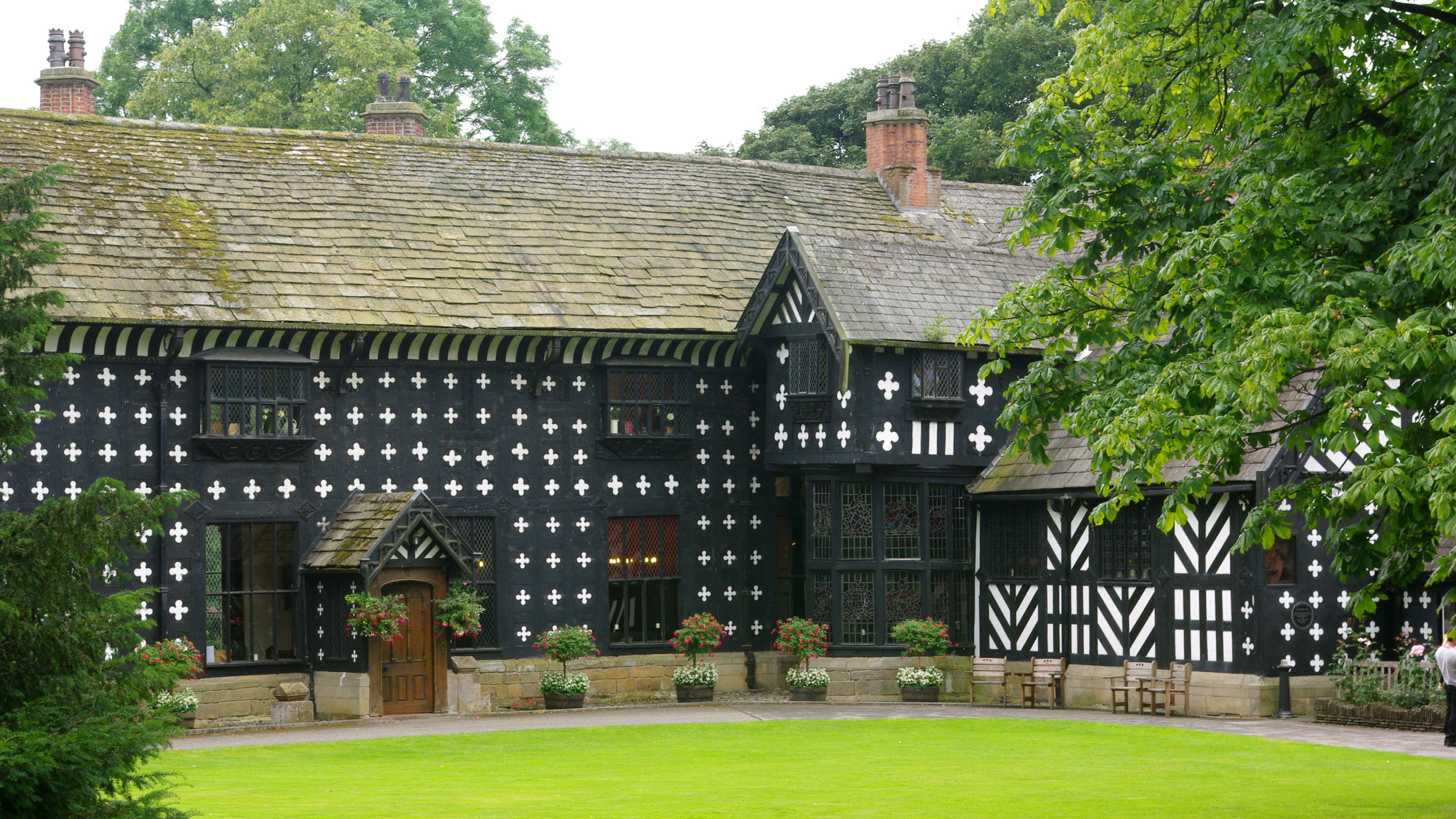
Samlesbury Hall

Samlesbury Hall is a manor house built in 1325 which has been many things since then including a public house and girls' boarding school, but since 1925, when it was saved from being demolished for its timber, it has been administered by a registered charitable trust, the Samlesbury Hall Trust. This Grade I listed medieval manor house attracts more than 50,000 visitors each year.

== Religious buildings ==
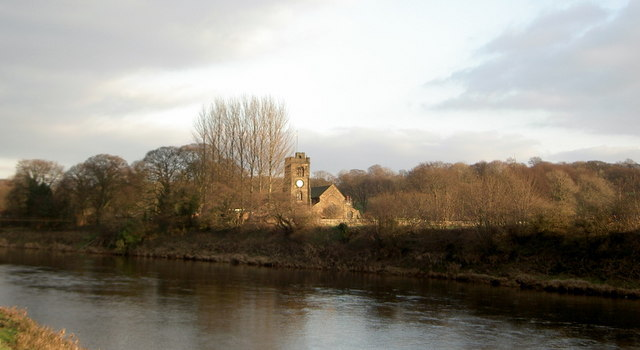
Samlesbury parish church

Samlesbury parish church, like the one at nearby Walton-le-Dale, is dedicated to St. Leonard the Less and was founded in 1096. The church contains a Norman font, a medieval bell and Sir Thomas Southworth's funerary armour dating from 1546. The Roman Catholic church is St Mary and St John Southworth. There was previously also a Wesleyan Methodist chapel.

== Education ==
Samlesbury benefits from having its own primary school called Samlesbury Church of England Primary School. The school is located beside the Church of St Leonard the Less, on the banks of the River Ribble.

== Samlesbury witches ==
The Samlesbury witches—Jane Southworth, Jennet Brierley and Ellen Brierley—were accused of child murder and cannibalism and tried at Lancaster Assizes on 19 August 1612, in the same series of trials as the Pendle witches. All three were found not guilty in a trial which one historian has described as "largely a piece of anti-Catholic propaganda".

== Samlesbury brewery ==
Samlesbury brewery is a large modern brewery belonging to InBev. It was completed in 1972 to brew Heineken lager for Whitbread. It produces Boddington's Bitter, and bottled and keg Bass Pale Ale for export.

== Samlesbury Engineering ==
Samlesbury Engineering was a subsidiary of the Lancashire Aircraft Corporation, both formed during the Second World War at Samlesbury Aerodrome, which was chaired by Sir Wavell Wakefield, later Lord Wakefield of Kendal. The company specialised in aircraft maintenance and parts production, and had depots at airfields around England. After the war it took over hangars vacated by the English Electric company, and played a significant role in supporting aircraft used on the Berlin Airlift. It later diversified into bus and truck body manufacturing. When work started to dry up, it moved to the south side of the airfield.

Their workshop, where the ill-fated Bluebird K7 was designed and built, was on the car park behind Samlesbury Hall. Bluebird K7 was the turbo jet-engined hydroplane in which Donald Campbell set seven world water speed records during the 1950s and in which he was killed on Coniston Water in 1967.

Samlesbury Engineering sold off the vehicle body business around 1961, and the remaining aviation activities soon became part of what is now BAE Systems, which today has a facility at BAE Samlesbury.

== See also ==
- Listed buildings in Samlesbury
