= Edgar Percival E.P.9 =

E.P.9
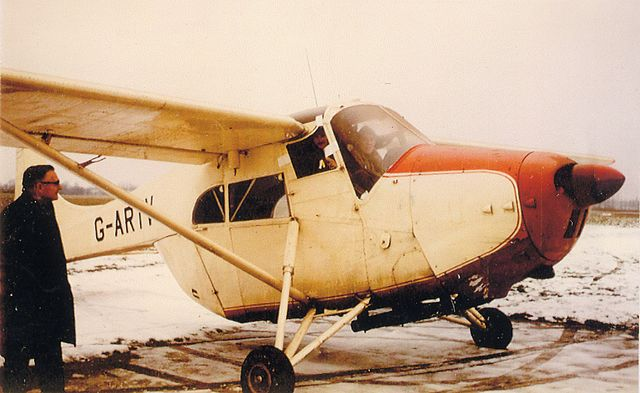
- Edgar Percival EP-9 at Ghent, Belgium c. 1972

General information
- Type: Light aircraft
- Manufacturer: Edgar Percival Aircraft Limited
- Designer: Edgar Percival
- Number built: 27

History
- First flight: 21 December 1955

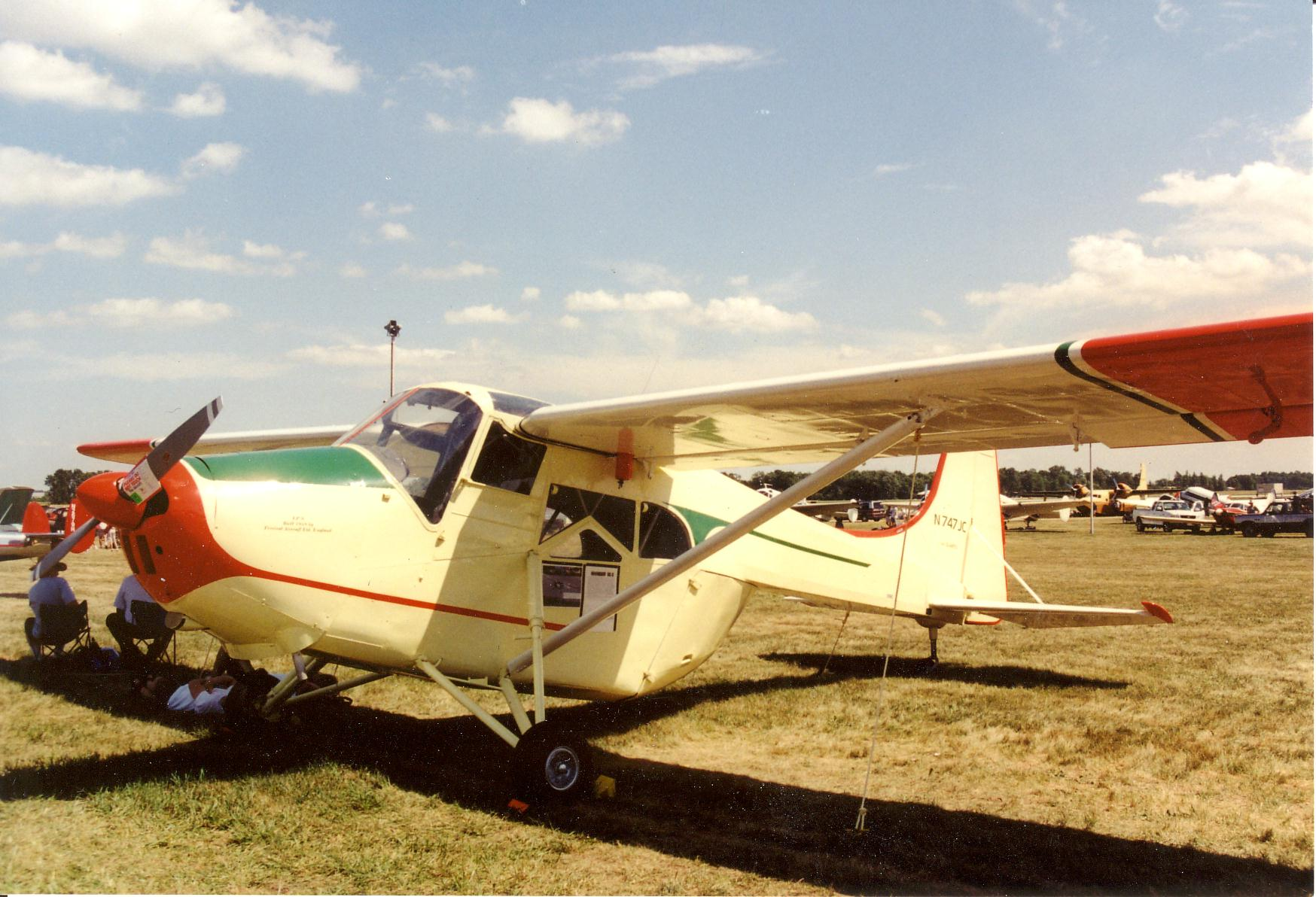
N747JC at Oshkosh, WI. 2001

The Edgar Percival E.P.9 was a 1950s British light utility aircraft designed by Edgar Percival and initially built by his company, Edgar Percival Aircraft Limited and later as the Lancashire Aircraft Prospector by the Lancashire Aircraft Company.

== Design and development ==
In 1954, Edgar Percival formed Edgar Percival Aircraft Limited at Stapleford Aerodrome, England, his original company had become part of the Hunting Group. His first new design, the Edgar Percival P.9 was a utility aircraft designed for agricultural use. The aircraft was a high-wing monoplane with an unusual pod and boom fuselage. The pod and boom design allowed the aircraft to be fitted with a hopper for crop spraying. The pilot and one passenger sat together with room for four more passengers. The clamshell side and rear doors also allowed the aircraft to carry standard size wool and straw bales or 45 imperial gallon (55 U.S. gallon) oil drums or even livestock. Even when the hopper was fitted, a ground crew of three could be carried when moving between sites.

== Operational history ==
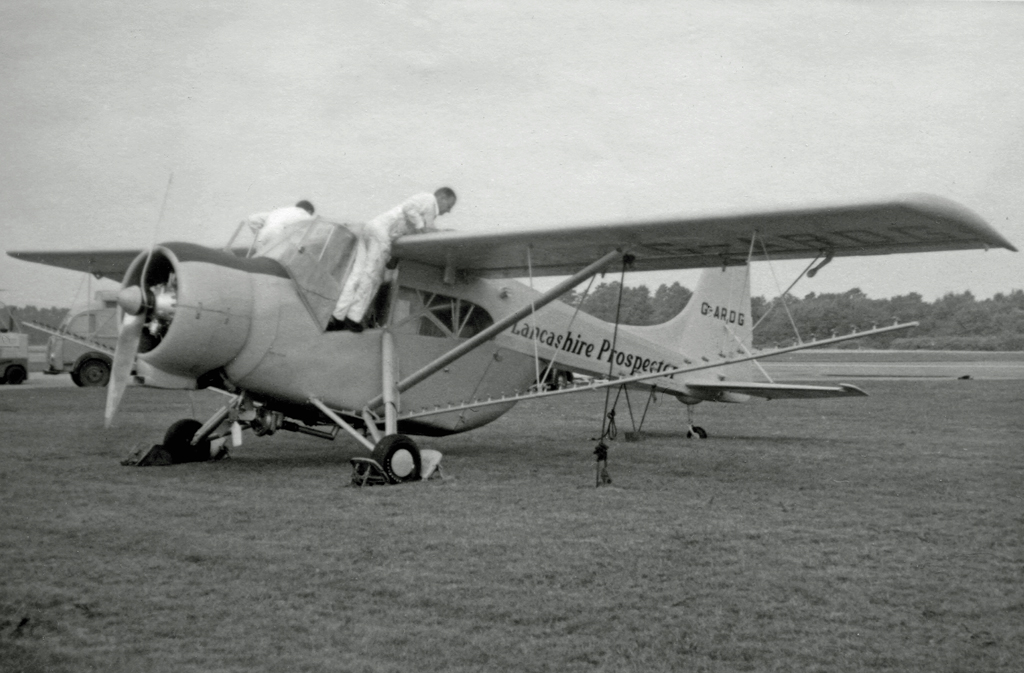
The sole new build Prospector Mark 2 fitted with a Cheetah radial engine. Exhibited at the 1960 Farnborough Airshow

The prototype (registered G-AOFU) first flew on 21 December 1955. After a demonstration tour of Australia four aircraft were ordered as crop-sprayers and an initial batch of 20 was built. Two aircraft were bought by the British Army in 1958. In the same year, Samlesbury Engineering Limited acquired the whole project which became a subsidiary named the Lancashire Aircraft Company. Lancashire Aircraft Company renamed the aircraft the Lancashire Prospector but only six more were built, the last of which was fitted with a Armstrong Siddeley Cheetah radial engine as the sole new build Mark Two.

In early 1958 World Wide Helicopters Ltd were operating three EP-9s out of Tripoli, Libya, on flights into and around the Libyan Sahara in support of oil exploration companies (mainly Esso-Libya). These aircraft were registered G-APCR, 'PCS and 'PCT, their construction numbers being 21, 24 and 25 respectively. In 1959 'PCR suffered a non-fatal accident in the far southwest of the country and may not have been subsequently recovered. The other two aircraft were sold in late 1959/early 1960.

In 1959 Kingsford Smith Aviation of Bankstown, Australia re-engined two aircraft with an Armstrong Siddeley Cheetah 10 radial engine as the EP-9C.

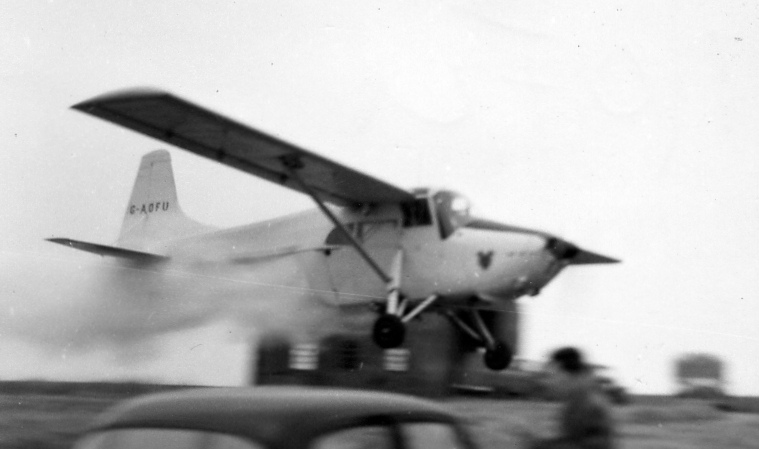
First prototype dusting in East Anglia, summer 1959

The E.P.9s in their various guises had a long and successful lifespan as private aircraft, utilized in multi-role STOL operations as an agricultural sprayer, light cargo aircraft, jump aircraft, air ambulance and glider tug. One EP-9 N747JC had a more chequered career and was one of two evaluated by the British Army Air Corps with serial XM819. It was once owned in the late 1960s by a gang of smugglers who found it the ideal way to smuggle stolen furs and counterfeit Swiss francs between England and Belgium. Although the criminals were apprehended in 1969, the EP-9 was finally offered for sale in Belgium in 1972. After three years of pleasure flying in England, the aircraft was shipped to the United States where it was stored in a Wisconsin barn until 1999. After extensive restoration, N747JC appeared at Oshkosh in 2001-03 and 2011, and as of October 2023, is registered to the Warbirds of The World Air Museum in New Mexico.

== Variants ==
Edgar Percival E.P.9
Production aircraft powered by a 270 hp Lycoming GO-480-B1B engine, 21 built.
Edgar Percival E.P.9C
Two aircraft re-engined with a 375 hp Armstrong Siddeley Cheetah 10 radial engine by Kingsford Smith Aviation at Bankstown Airport in Sydney, Australia.
Lancashire Aircraft Prospector
Continued production powered by a 295 hp Lycoming GO-480-G1A6 engine, six built.
Lancashire Aircraft Prospector II
Prototype (c/n 47 G-ARDG) officially re-engined with a 375 hp Armstrong Siddeley Cheetah 10 radial engine.

Total produced - 27 airframes (a further fuselage was not completed)

== Surviving aircraft ==
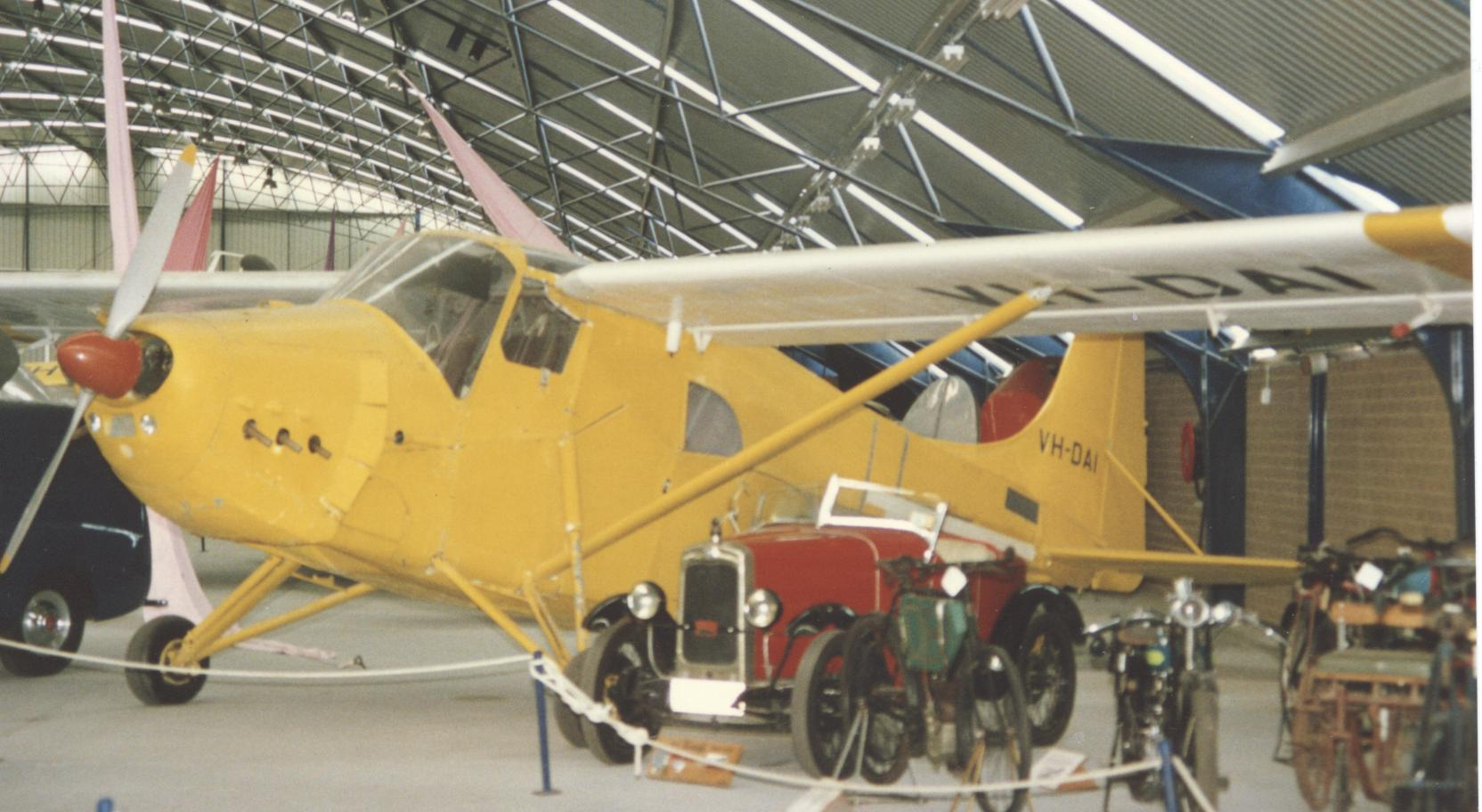
E.P.9 c/n 28 VH-DAI displayed in Drage Airworld Wangaratta Victoria in 1988

- c/n 28 VH-EPN, formerly VH-DAI, restored and registered 1998 Victoria, Australia
- c/n 30 CF-NWI stored Reynolds-Alberta Museum, Wetaskiwin, Alberta, Canada
- c/n 36 ZS-CHZ, displayed as 'XM797', airworthy, based SAAF Historic Flight, Zwartkop, South Africa
- c/n 39 N747JC, airworthy, based Los Lunas, New Mexico, United States
- c/n 41 N8395 airworthy (currently being restored), based Mississippi, United States
- c/n 42 ZK-PWZ airworthy, based Kairanga Aviation Ltd, New Zealand
- c/n 43 XM819 Museum of Army Flying, Middle Wallop, England

== Specifications (E.P.9) ==
Data from Jane's all the World's Aircraft 1959–60, British Civil Aircraft since 1919 - Volume 2

General characteristics

- Crew: 1
- Capacity: 5 pax / 2 stretchers + 2 attendants / 1pax + 185 cu ft (5.2 m^{3}) of cargo / hopper for 1,550 lb (700 kg) chemicals
- Length: 29 ft 6 in (8.99 m)
- Wingspan: 43 ft 6 in (13.26 m)
- Height: 8 ft 9 in (2.67 m)
- Wing area: 227.6 sq ft (21.14 m^{2})
- Aspect ratio: 8.31
- Empty weight: 2,072 lb (940 kg)
- Gross weight: 3,700 lb (1,678 kg) maximum non-agricultural
- Max takeoff weight: 4,320 lb (1,960 kg) agricultural missions
- Fuel capacity: 56 imp gal (67 US gal; 250 L) in two wing tanks

56 imp gal (67 US gal; 250 L) optional cabin ferry tank
17 imp gal (20 US gal; 77 L) fuselage mounted slipper tank
2.5 imp gal (3.0 US gal; 11 L) oil

- Powerplant: 1 × Lycoming GO-480-G1A6 6-cylinder air-cooled horizontally-opposed piston engine, 295 hp (220 kW)
- Propellers: 3-bladed Hartzell constant-speed propeller

Performance

- Maximum speed: 127 kn (146 mph, 235 km/h) at 3,700 lb (1,700 kg)
- Max continuous speed: 123.4 kn (142.0 mph; 228.5 km/h)
- Cruise speed: 104.3 kn (120.0 mph, 193.2 km/h) at 3,700 lb (1,700 kg)
- Stall speed: 30.4 kn (35.0 mph, 56.3 km/h) at 3,700 lb (1,700 kg)
- Range: 504 nmi (580 mi, 933 km) normal fuel
- Range with slipper tank: 660.4 nmi (760.0 mi; 1,223.1 km)
- Ferry range: 1,025.4 nmi (1,180.0 mi, 1,899.0 km) with cabin ferry tank
- Service ceiling: 17,500 ft (5,300 m)
- Rate of climb: 960 ft/min (4.9 m/s) at 3,700 lb (1,700 kg)

== See also ==
Aircraft of comparable role, configuration, and era

- Aero Ae 50
- Boeing YL-15
