= Listed buildings in Samlesbury =

Samlesbury is a civil parish in the South Ribble district of Lancashire, England. It contains 22 listed buildings that are recorded in the National Heritage List for England. Of these, two are listed at Grade I, the highest of the three grades, and the others are at Grade II, the lowest grade. The parish is mainly rural, and many of its listed buildings are houses, farmhouses and farm buildings. The most important buildings are Samlesbury Hall and the parish church, both of which are listed at Grade I. The other listed buildings include structures associated with the church, a school, a bridge, a church built in the 19th century, and a lodge to the hall.

== Key ==
Grade	Criteria
I	Buildings of exceptional interest, sometimes considered to be internationally important
II	Buildings of national importance and special interest

== Buildings ==
Name and location	Photograph	Date	Notes	Grade
Samlesbury Hall; 53.76934°N 2.57247°W		15th century (probable)	A large house, altered and extended in the 16th century, and restored in the 19th century. The original part, the Great Hall, is cruck-framed, and the later parts are partly timber-framed and partly in brick, all on a stone plinth. The house has two wings are right angles to each other. The Great Hall forms part of the west wing, and the south wing contains a chapel. Features include timber-framing with herring-bone and quatrefoil decoration, diapering in blue brick, oriel windows, bay windows, mullioned windows, and large external chimneys.	I
The Samuel Whitbread; 53.75872°N 2.61897°W	—	16th century (probable)	A house, later used as a restaurant, in sandstone and brick, partly rendered, with large quoins and a slate roof. It has two storeys, and an L-shaped plan consisting of a main range with a cross wing on the left. There are large rectangular lintels over the doorway and over a window to its left. Some windows are sashes, and other are casements. Inside the main range is a large bressumer, and inside the cross wing is timber-framing with wattle and daub infill.	II
Upper Barn, Stanley Coppice Farm; 53.74478°N 2.59133°W	—	16th century (probable)	The barn was altered and enlarged in the 19th century. It is cruck-framed, and contains three large full cruck trusses. The barn now has stone walls and a corrugated iron roof, and contains doors and windows.	II
Church of St Leonard the Less; 53.76800°N 2.62370°W		1588	The church contains some 12th-century masonry, and the tower and porches date from 1899–1900. It is in sandstone, and consists of a nave and chancel in one cell with a clerestory, aisles, two south porches, and a northwest tower. The windows along the sides of the church have three lights and are mullioned, and the east window contains Perpendicular tracery. The tower has diagonal buttresses, a west doorway, a stair turret, and an embattled parapet. Inside the church are decorated box pews, and two stages of a previous three-decker pulpit.	I
Maudsley Fold; 53.74505°N 2.59949°W	—	Early 17th century or earlier	Originally a farmhouse, it is cruck-framed with walls of sandstone and brick, and it has a slate roof. The house has a linear plan of four bays, and is in two storeys with attics. At the rear are two gabled dormers, and casement windows in the ground floor. Inside the house are two full cruck trusses.	II
Barn, Upland Farm; 53.76463°N 2.59797°W	—	17th century or earlier	The barn is cruck-framed and clad in stone and has a slate roof. It has four bays, an outshut at the front, and a brick lean-to extension at the left. The barn contains opposing wagon entrances, doors and windows. Inside there are three full cruck trusses.	II
Samlesbury Lower Hall; 53.77847°N 2.61431°W	—	c. 1625	The ruin of a former house, with only the front wall remaining. It is in sandstone, and it extends for nine bays. Originally with two storeys, 1 /2 storeys remain. There is a central three-storey gabled porch and a doorway with a chamfered surround. Most of the windows are cross windows.	II
Stanley House and Stanley Coppice Farm Cottage; 53.74408°N 2.59179°W	—	17th century	The house and attached cottage are in roughcast stone with a stone-slate roof and have two storeys. The house, originally in two bays, was extended by one bay to the left in the 18th century, and the two-bay cottage was added to the right in the 19th century. On the front of the house is a large two-storey gabled porch with finials on the kneelers and the apex. In the bottom storey is a doorway, and in the upper storey is a three-light stepped window with a hood mould with a blocked circular opening over it. In the ground floor of the first bay is a very small window, and at the rear is a mullioned window.	II
Hole Bottom Cottage; 53.76399°N 2.59745°W	—	Late 17th century (probable)	A house, later divided into two dwellings, in brick on a low stone plinth with a slate roof. It has three bays; the first two bays have two storeys, and the third bay, which is at a lower level, has one storey and an attic. The windows contain modern casements. Inside the house, in the second bay, is an inglenook and a bressumer.	II
Intack Cottage; 53.77063°N 2.54856°W	—	Late 17th century	A stone house with quoins and a stone-slate roof, in two storeys and with two bays. On the front is a gabled porch containing side benches. Flanking the porch on the ground floor are casement windows, the other windows on the front being mullioned. In the left gable wall is a modern window in the ground floor and a round window above.	II
Seed House Farmhouse; 53.77228°N 2.62036°W	—	Late 17th century (probable)	A sandstone farmhouse, partly pebbledashed, with a slate roof, in two storeys and with two bays. On the front is a two-storey gabled porch that has an open doorcase with large stone blocks. The windows were originally mullioned. Inside the house, in the upper floor, are timber-framed partitions.	II
Goose House Farmhouse; 53.77693°N 2.58579°W	—	Late 17th or early 18th century	The farmhouse is in rendered brick on a stone plinth with some quoins. The roof is in slate at the front and stone-slate at the rear. The house is in two storeys and three bays, and has a two-story porch containing stone seats. All the windows have been altered. Inside the farmhouse is an inglenook and a bressumer.	II
Barn, Higher Barn Farm; 53.74500°N 2.60212°W	—	c.1700	The barn is in sandstone with a slate roof. It has six bays with outshuts added later, and is in two storeys. It contains opposed wagon doorways (one is blocked), doors in both floors, and an owl hole.	II
Sorbrose House; 53.76420°N 2.57760°W	—	c.1700	A house in brick on a stone plinth, with a roof of slate at the front and stone-slate at the rear. There are two storeys with attics, and three bays. On the front is a two-storey gabled porch, and all the windows on the front are modern top-hung casements. In the left gable are two attic windows, and in the right gable is a 19th-century belfry opening. At the rear are windows of various types, and a single-storey extension.	II
Moulden's House; 53.75417°N 2.61596°W	—	1727	A sandstone house with quoins and a roof of red tiles. It has two storeys and two bays, with a single-storey extension to the right. The doorway has a large inscribed lintel. There are two windows on each floor. Inside there are timber-framed partitions with wattle and daub infill.	II
Sundial; 53.76795°N 2.62348°W	—	1742	The sundial is in the churchyard of the Church of St Leonard the Less. It consists of a shaped column about 1.5 metres (4 ft 11 in) that has a moulded capital with two copper bands. On the top is a copper plate and a gnomon.	II
Old font 53.76804°N 2.62350°W	—	1769	The tub font was removed from the Church of St Leonard the Less in about 1900, and was placed in the churchyard in 1975. It consists of a plain cylindrical inscribed stone tube.	II
Rowley Fold Farmhouse; 53.76311°N 2.61002°W	—	1780	The house is in sandstone with rusticated quoins and a slate roof. It has two storeys with an attic, and has a symmetrical two-bay front. In the centre is a doorcase with Tuscan columns, an open pediment, and a semicircular fanlight with radiating glazing bars. The windows on the front are sashes, and at the rear is a stairlight window and three mullioned windows.	II
Church of Saint John Southworth and presbytery 53.76762°N 2.61817°W		1818	The Roman Catholic church and presbytery are under one roof, and are in stone, with quoins and a slate roof. The church has a round-headed doorway, above which is an inscribed tablet, and the windows are lunettes. The presbytery has two storeys and a symmetrical three-bay stuccoed front. It has a moulded doorcase with a semicircular fanlight, and the windows are sashes. On the roof is a bellcote.	II
Church of England School; 53.76814°N 2.62415°W	—	1836	The school, in Tudor style, is in stone with a slate roof. It has a rectangular plan and is in one storey. There is a central gabled porch with finials, and a mullioned window with an inscribed stone above. On both sides of the porch is a doorway, each with an inscribed tablet above. Flanking the porch are two square windows on each side, all with hood moulds, and containing modern casements. The iron railings in front of the school are included in the listing.	II
Alum Scar Bridge; 53.75010°N 2.55379°W		19th century (probable)	The bridge is probably the replacement of an earlier bridge. It is in sandstone and consists of a single high segmental arch carrying a track across Alum House Brook. The side walls are buttressed between abutments, and there is rounded coping in the middle of the parapets.	II
Lodge, Samlesbury Hall; 53.76940°N 2.57013°W		Late 18th century	The lodge is in rendered brick on a stone plinth, and has been painted with quatrefoils to resemble the hall. It has one storey and a square plan, with the roof forming two gables on each front. There is a central doorway, and on each side are two six-light mullioned windows. On the north side of the plinth is an inscription.	II
