= Edgar Percival =

Aircraft designer and pilot

- Edgar Percival with his Mew Gull, UK, 15 March 1934
- Born: 23 February 1897; Albury, New South Wales
- Died: 21 January 1984 (aged 86); London, United Kingdom
- Occupations: Aviator; Designer

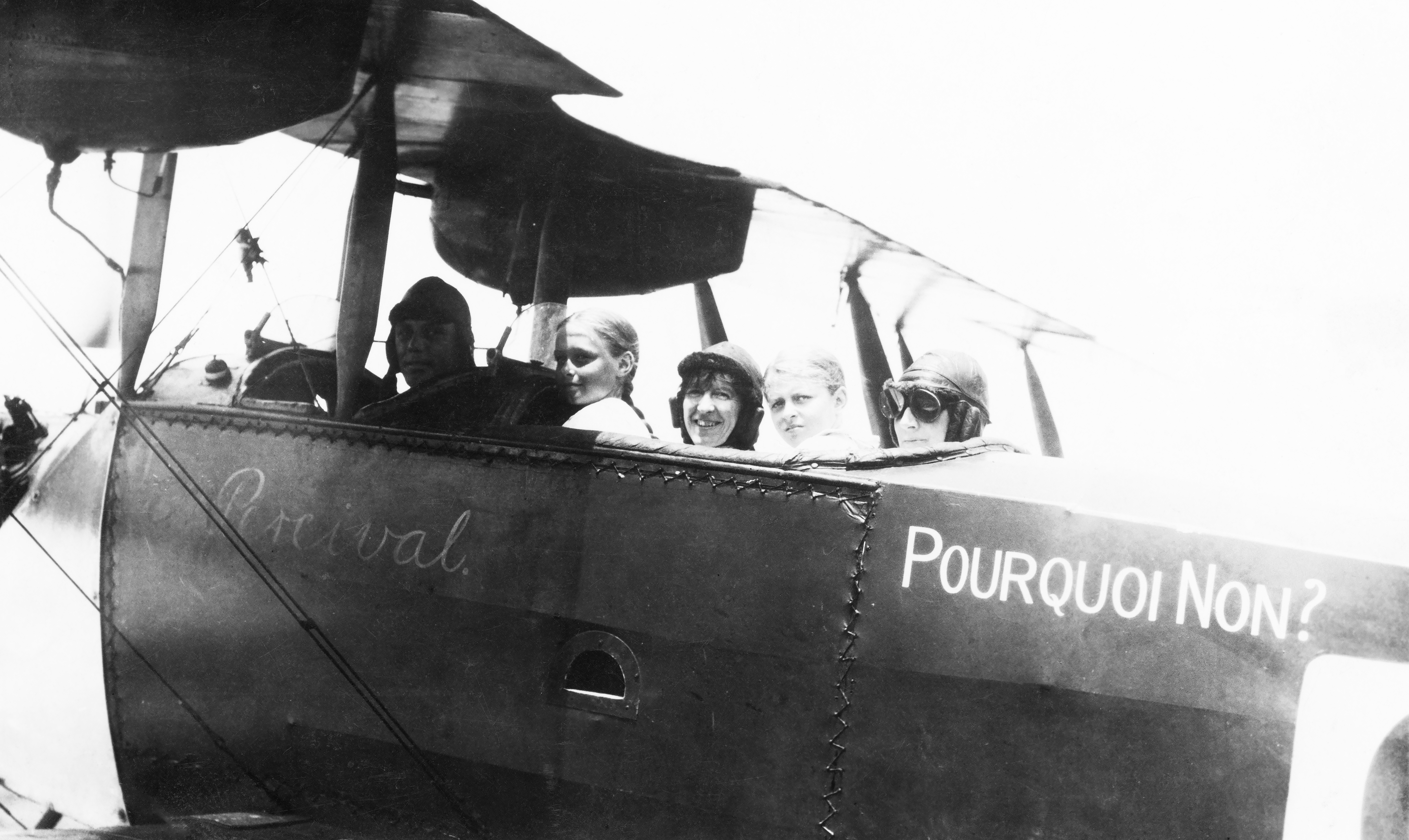
Captain Edgar Percival, January 1922 with joy flight passengers, Kirra Beach, Queensland

Edgar Wikner Percival (23 February 1897 – 21 January 1984) was an Australian aircraft designer and pilot whose aircraft were distinguished by speed and grace. Percival went on to set up the Percival Aircraft Company, a British aircraft company.

== Early years ==
Percival was born in 1898 at Albury, New South Wales, the son of Blanche Hilda Leontina Percival, née Wikner and William Percival, a butter manufacturer. Edgar Percival's maternal great uncle was the Swedish philosopher Pontus Wikner.

As a child Percival assisted at his family's farm, on the flats of the Hawkesbury River at Richmond, New South Wales. He also became fascinated by aviation, especially after seeing an aeroplane for the first time in 1911, when a local dental surgeon and pioneer aviator, William Ewart Hart, landed on the council field in Richmond, near the Percival property. After helping to maintain Hart's aircraft, Percival received, as a reward, his first flight. By 1912, when he was 14, Percival had designed, produced and flown his own gliders.

He attended Richmond Grammar school until he left at the age of 15, to become an apprentice engineer at a Sydney firm. He later enrolled at Sydney Technical College, before undertaking a short course in aeronautical engineering at Sydney University.

== First World War ==
In December 1915, Percival volunteered for overseas service with the Australian Imperial Force, as a private with the 7th Light Horse Regiment. After being promoted to temporary sergeant, he embarked in April 1916 for Palestine.

Percival requested a transfer from the AIF to pilot training with the British Royal Flying Corps (RFC), and was accepted in November 1916. After going solo in 20 minutes in 1917, Percival was assigned to No. 60 Squadron, a scout (fighter) unit in France, commanded by the Canadian ace Billy Bishop. Percival was noted for his flying skills and after he was promoted to captain, transferred to No. 111 Squadron as one of its founding members. With 111 Sqn he saw service in the Middle East and Greece. In 1918, while serving in Egypt, Percival designed his first powered aircraft, "a special-purpose aircraft based on the Bristol F.2B, with the Rolls-Royce Eagle engine". In August 1919 he was elected as a member of the Royal Aero Club.

== Inter-war period ==
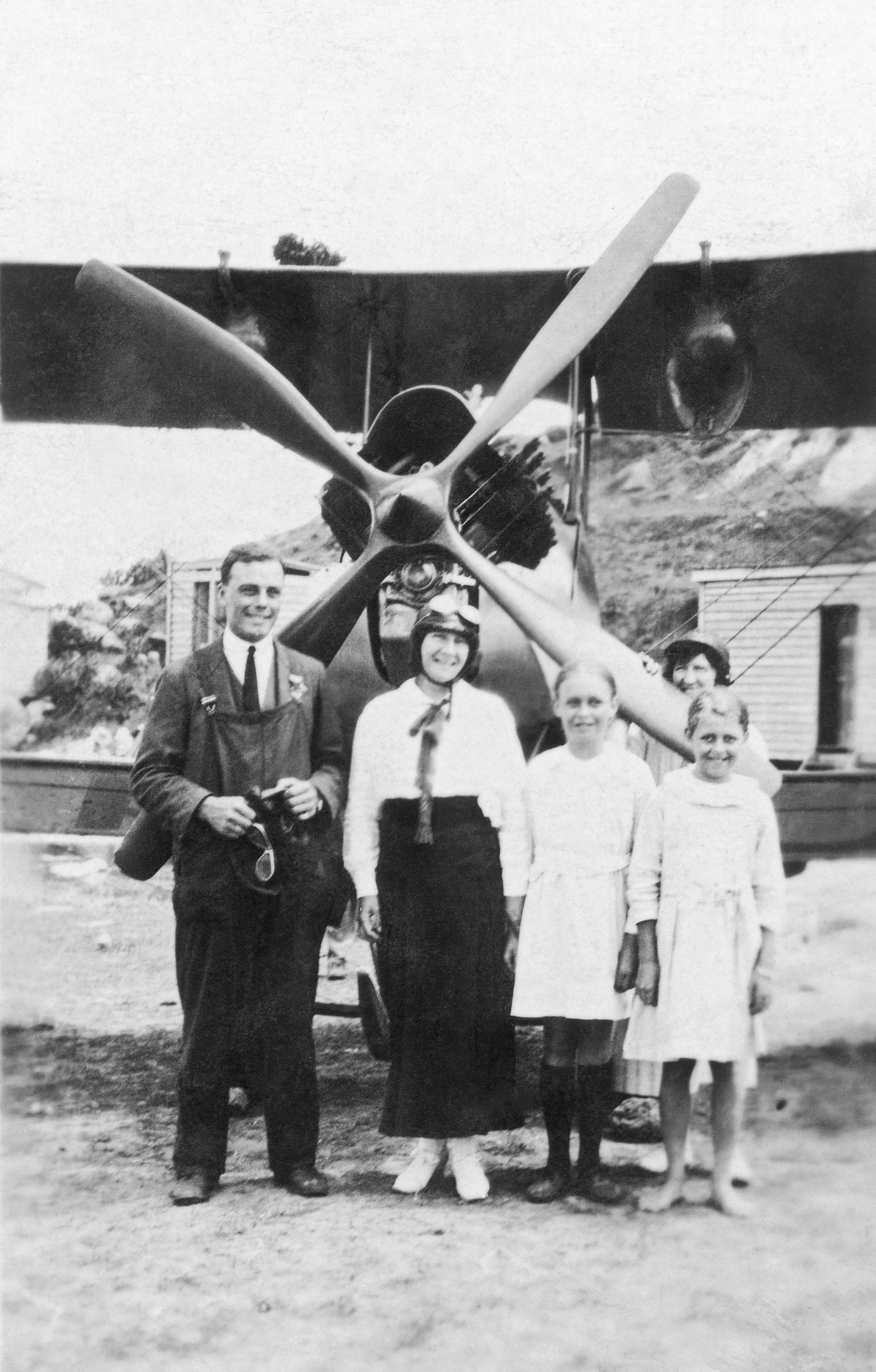
Captain Edgar Percival with his joy flight passengers and plane, Greenmount Beach, February 1922

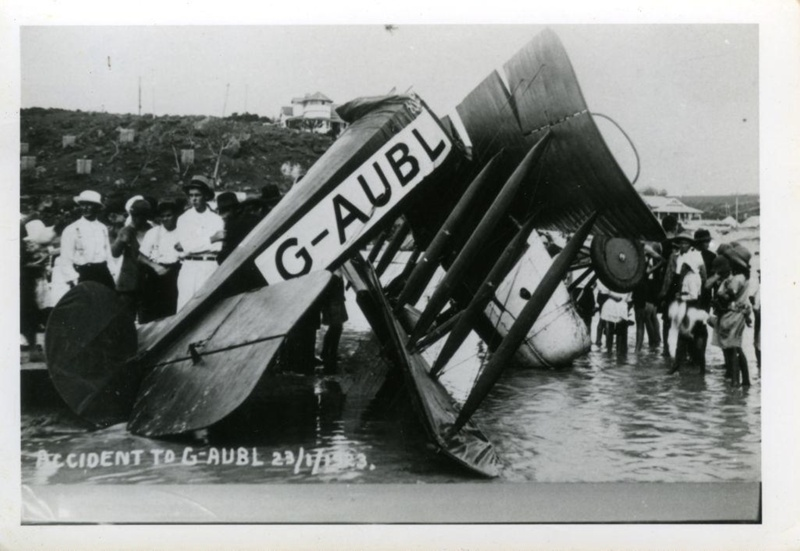
Wreck of aeroplane G - AUBL on Coolangatta beach, 23 January 1923

After the First World War Percival returned to Australia with three surplus aircraft, two Avro 504s and a de Havilland DH.6, to do film work, stunt flying, barnstorming and charter flights, operating his own charter company. A number of notable flights were made: in 1921 he surveyed the Melbourne-Brisbane route in an Avro 504, and in 1923, he won the Melbourne to Geelong Race.

Despite these successes there were a number of incidents with two notable ones occurring in 1921 and 1923. On 24 January 1921 a three year old child, Mary Williams, was killed while Percival was attempting to land in Liverpool, he had to swerve when a elderly man began to walk across the landing space and, in adjusting to this taxied further than expected and hit the child with the undergear. Following this incident there was an inquest and the coroner found Percival not responsible and found fault with the adults in the crowd. In 23 January 1923 he experienced another setback when he crashed in Coolangatta following a failed take off on a planned flight to Brisbane while carrying two passengers but, despite the plane being significantly damaged, the passengers and pilot were uninjured. The accident was caused when trying to avoid travelling close to two children who were playing on the beach.

In Australia Percival began to take a further interest in aircraft design; he built the winning entry in the 1924 Australian Aero Club competition to design a light aircraft. In 1926, flying an aircraft that he had helped design, he competed in a Federal Government challenge for both design and piloting skills, winning £940 in prize money.

Later in the same year, Percival was involved in a series of proving flights that helped establish the use of carrier-borne fighters, culminating in him taking off in a Sopwith Pup from the turret of the USS Idaho battleship, at Guantanamo Bay, Cuba.

Percival returned to England in 1929 where he was appointed as an Air Ministry test pilot, specializing in amphibians, seaplanes and Schneider Trophy racers and went on to set up his own firm, the Percival Aircraft Company, to produce his aircraft designs. Edgar Percival was also very active as a pilot during the interwar period; not only did he compete with regular success, but his designs were widely used by other racing and record-setting pilots who held his products in very high regard. Noted racing pilots of the time who also flew Percival's machines included C.W.A. Scott, Jim and Amy Mollison, Charles Gardner and Giles Guthrie. Many came to Percival to have their machines specially built and modified for the task in hand – usually to extend their already long range.

"The Hat" c. 1935

Percival was a noted character on the air racing scene at the time, and was often referred to in the aeronautical press of the day as "The Hat," the nickname resulting from his omnipresent hat, which he also wore while flying, along with a lounge-suit) He was respected as a highly competitive and able pilot, taking great pride in being awarded the prize for "fastest time" in handicap air racing, as well as being a rather fiery, impatient and irascible businessman and employer. During this period, Edgar Percival served in the Reserve of Air Force Officers, 1929–1939 and was a founding member of the Guild of Air Pilots and Air Navigators.

== Percival Aircraft Company ==
Percival's interest in aircraft technology led him to design the Saro Percival Mail Carrier (1930), one of a series of collaborative projects with Saunders Roe Ltd. Having had interests in the company which he sold in 1932, Percival began searching for an established manufacturer to produce a light aeroplane which he had designed called the Percival Gull. Finding no company that was willing to take on production, Percival therefore started his own company, the Percival Aircraft Company. In collaboration with Lt. Cdr E.B.W. Leake (who was to become co-founder of Percival Aircraft), he arranged for the prototype Gull (registered as G-ABUR) to be produced by the Lowe-Wylde British Aircraft Company of Maidstone, Kent.

Running the business from his private address in London (20, Grosvenor Square), Percival then arranged for series production to be contracted out to George Parnall & Sons, of Yate, Gloucestershire, an arrangement that lasted two years. Percival Aircraft was officially formed in 1933. In 1934, after 24 Gulls had been produced at Parnalls, Percival set up his own factory at London Gravesend Airport, Kent.

Edgar Percival's aircraft were renowned for their graceful lines and outstanding performance. As a noted test pilot, Percival continued to fly his own creations; in 1935, he flew a Gull from England to Morocco and back to England, winning the Oswald Watt Gold Medal. He was the first pilot to fly from Britain to Africa and back in one day. He left Gravesend at 1.30am and returned to Croydon at 6.20pm. "Day trips in the future will be as commonplace as trips to Margate" he said in a broadcast at nine o'clock. Other famous aviators were associated with Percival aircraft; in 1933 Charles Kingsford Smith flew a Gull Four named Miss Southern Cross from England to Australia in the record breaking time of 7 days, 4 hours and 44 minutes. The New Zealand aviator Jean Batten also used the Percival Gull to fly from England to Australia in October 1936. A pure racing member of the Gull series, the Percival Mew Gull, was flown by other illustrious pilots including Alex Henshaw and Tom Campbell Black to set many speed and distance records in the 1930s.

In late 1936 Percival transferred production to larger facilities at the newly built Luton Corporation Airport in Bedfordshire. A two-bay hangar was constructed to accommodate the workshops and the design offices were set up in the original Georgian farmhouse situated nearby. Production at Luton was then primarily focused on the Vega Gull. A small twin-engined machine, the Q6, was also produced in limited quantities, using a pair of de Havilland Gipsy Six Series II engines driving variable-pitch propellers. Again, the same basic method of construction was employed and the finished result was an aesthetically pleasing and aerodynamically clean feederliner which represented the final new design produced by the company prior to Edgar Percival selling his interests in the company.

In 1938, with war imminent, Percival developed a military communications and R/T operator training version of the Vega Gull named the Proctor. This was powered by a 205 hp Gipsy Queen II engine. During the Second World War, a great deal of Proctor production was sub-contracted out and the designs of other firms, including the Airspeed Oxford and de Havilland Mosquito were, in turn, produced by Percival Aircraft at Luton.

In March 1940, Percival resigned from the company, his dual roles being taken up by P.D. Acland (formerly Aviation Manager of Vickers Ltd.) who was appointed Managing Director and Arthur Bage who became the Chief Designer. During the war years, Percival served in the Royal Air Force Volunteer Reserve.

== Later years ==
Percival Aircraft was bought in September 1944 by Hunting & Son Ltd; Edgar Percival sold his interest in his company and moved to the United States to continue work on engine technology. From 1954, his old company began trading under the name Hunting Percival Aircraft Ltd; "Percival" was not dropped from the company name until 1957.

Percival became a naturalized US citizen in 1948.

He went to New Zealand in 1951, where he was involved with pioneering aerial application efforts.

In 1954, Percival formed a new company, Edgar Percival Aircraft Limited, at Stapleford Aerodrome, England. The company's first design, the Edgar Percival E.P.9 was a utility aircraft well suited to agricultural use. A total of 21 were constructed before Percival sold his company in 1960 to Samlesbury Engineering; the new company formed Lancashire Aircraft Company to continue aircraft construction of the E.P.9.

At the time of his death in 1984, Percival was working on aviation projects in the UK and New Zealand.
