= Samlesbury Hall =

Historic house in Lancashire, England

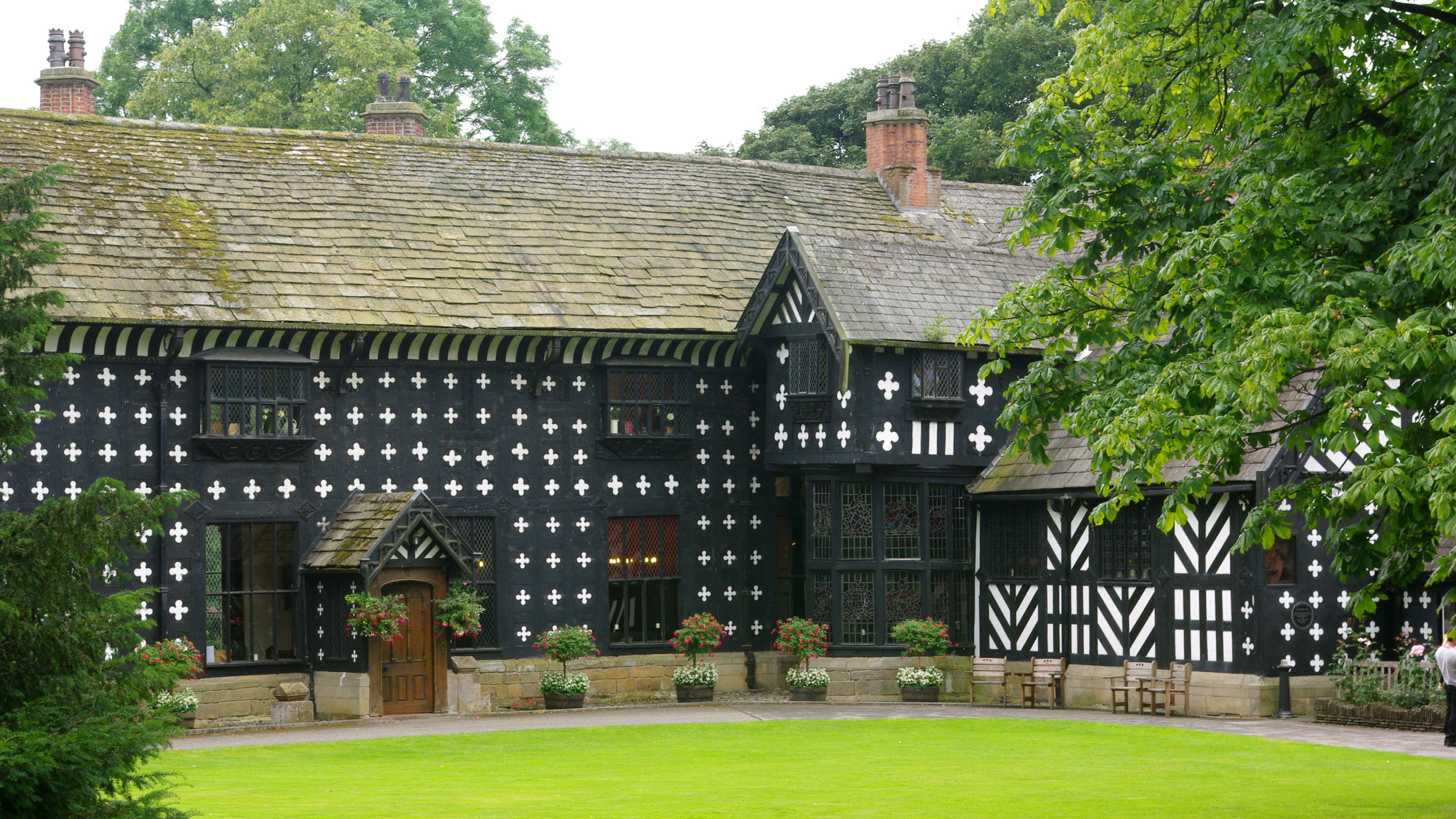

- Location within the Borough of South Ribble

General information
- Location: Samlesbury, Lancashire, England
- Coordinates: 53.7695°N 2.5727°W
- Completed: 1325

Design and construction
- Architect: Gilbert de Southworth

Website
- www.samlesburyhall.co.uk

Listed Building – Grade I
- Designated: 25 July 1952
- Reference no.: 1361389

Listed Building – Grade II
- Official name: Lodge to Samlesbury Hall
- Designated: 27 February 1984
- Reference no.: 1074096

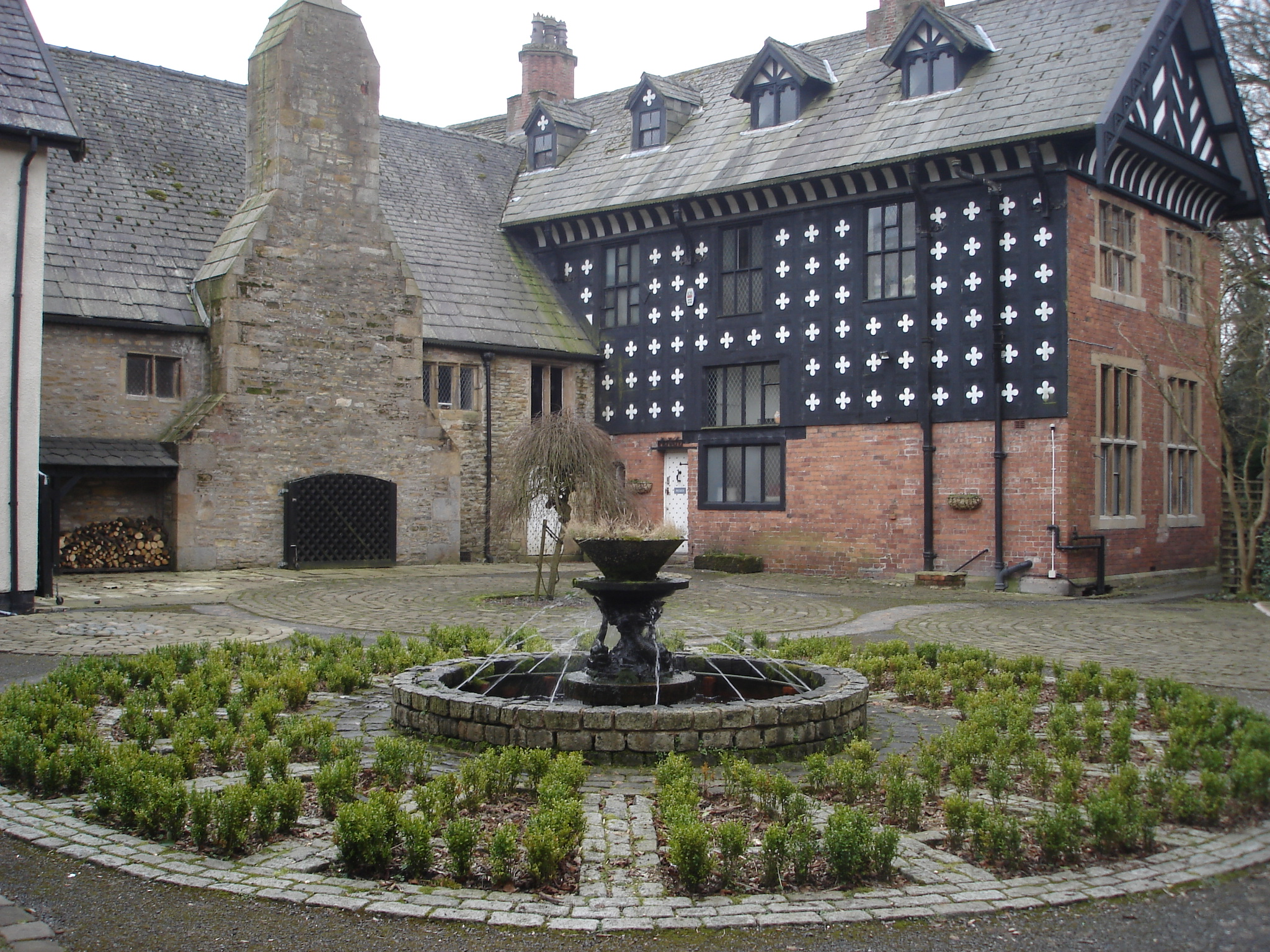
Courtyard

Samlesbury Hall is a historic house in Samlesbury, Lancashire, England, six miles (10 km) east of Preston. It was built in 1325 by Gilbert de Southworth (b. 1270), and was the primary home of the Southworth family until the early 17th century.

Samlesbury Hall may have been built to replace an earlier building destroyed during a raid by the Scots, during The Great Raid of 1322. The hall has been many things in its past including a public house and a girls' boarding school, but since 1925, when it was saved from being demolished for its timber, it has been administered by a registered charitable trust, the Samlesbury Hall Trust. This Grade I listed medieval manor house attracts more than 50,000 visitors each year.

Samlesbury Hall is open to the public daily except on Saturdays.

== History ==
Before being owned by the Southworths, Samlesbury manor belonged to the d'Ewyas family.

Gilbert de Southworth of Warrington acquired half of the manor by marriage to Alice d'Ewyas and is credited with building the Great Hall around 1325. His great-grandson Thomas built the south-west wing. Southworth descendants held their part of the manor until 1677–78, when it was sold by Edward Southworth to Thomas Bradyll. Bradyll never lived at the hall but stripped much of its interior features to use at his main house of Conishead Priory at Ulverston. He then rented the hall out to handloom weavers before it was converted into the Bradyll Arms inn in 1830. The next owner was John Cooper, who bought the building in 1850 and leased it to Mrs Mary Ann Harrison as a co-educational boarding school. She established a Pestolozzian Institution at the hall, based on the ideas of the 18th-century Swiss educational reformer Johann Heinrich Pestalozzi. The school was well ahead of its time and in some ways anticipated the better-known Montessori system by about fifty years.

Joseph Harrison, of Galligreaves Hall, a prominent Blackburn industrialist, substantially renovated the hall after he bought it in November 1862. William Harrison, Joseph's eldest son, lived at the hall until 1879, when he committed suicide. A fall on the ice in January of that year caused traumatic injuries to William's brain and a leg, resulting in extreme depression. His father, Joseph Harrison, died the next year at Galligreaves Hall, 18 February 1880, "after a prolonged illness". Ownership of the hall then passed to Joseph's youngest son, Henry, who resided in Blackburn. He was mayor of Blackburn in 1880–81 and became an Honorary Freeman of the Borough.

Although still owned by the Harrisons, the hall was tenanted for a number of years by Frederick Baynes and his family. Baynes was also a mayor of Blackburn, serving from 1896 to 1897. When Henry Harrison died in 1914, the estate of Samlesbury Hall was entailed to his nephew Mr. M. J. C. Johnston, son of Henry's sister Agnes.

However, the hall had been left empty since 1909 until it was bought in 1924 by a building firm who intended to demolish it and build a housing estate. After money was raised by public subscription, the hall was purchased in 1925 and put in the hands of the Samlesbury Hall Trust, who have managed it since then.

== Architecture ==
The hall was built with its solar end windows facing east, as was the practice. When the chapel was constructed 140 years later, it too was built to face east. However, when the chapel was connected to the main hall 60 years later, the angle of connection was less than 90° because of the solstice change in the Sun's position over the years. The chapel was originally built by the Southworth family to upgrade the house to a manor house, which had to have a large household, a chapel and priest, a store of fish for Fridays, usually a pond and a water mill and a grain store. Therefore, Samlesbury Hall reflects the building styles and religious beliefs from the 14th century to the present day.

== See also ==
- Grade I listed buildings in Lancashire
- Listed buildings in Samlesbury
- Samlesbury witches – trial of Jane Southworth for witchcraft
- John Southworth – member of Southworth family hanged, drawn and quartered as a Catholic martyr
- Bluebird K7 – World record holding speedboat built at Samlesbury
