= Lancashire Aircraft Corporation =

British airline and engineering company (1942 – 1957)

Lancashire Aircraft Corporation Ltd
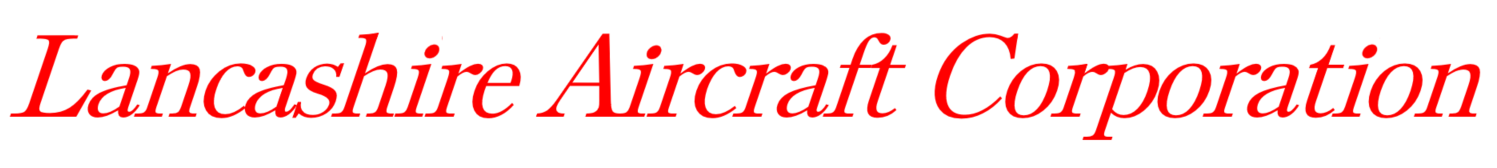

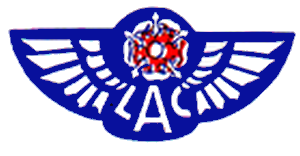
- Founded: 1942
- Commenced operations: 1946 (airline-type operations)
- Ceased operations: 1958 (merged network into Silver City Airways-Northern Division)
- Operating bases: Samlesbury Aerodrome
- Hubs: Blackpool Squires Gate
- Secondary hubs: Yeadon Aerodrome, Bovingdon
- Subsidiaries: Samlesbury Engineering Ltd
- Destinations: Isle of Man, Manchester, Birmingham, London (Northolt), Jersey
- Parent company: Eric Rylands Ltd.
- Headquarters: Berkeley Street, London W.1
- Key people: Eric Rylands

Lancashire Aircraft Corporation was a major British charter airline after World War II, founded by Eric Rylands. The company played an important role in the Berlin Airlift. It also flew scheduled routes and was instrumental in the development of "coach-air services", leading to the establishment of Skyways Coach-Air and the start of the Inclusive Tour (IT) industry. Its major subsidiary, Samlesbury Engineering, supported its operations and converted many military aircraft for commercial use, also founding Lancashire Aircraft Co.

== History ==
=== Foundation ===
Lancashire Aircraft Corporation Ltd. (LAC) was formed at Samlesbury Aerodrome between Preston and Blackburn in Lancashire, during World War II, along with a subsidiary aircraft maintenance company, Samlesbury Engineering Ltd. The headquarters were in Berkeley Street, London W1. One of the founders was John Eric Rylands, who was destined to become a major influencer in the British airline industry.

LAC was contracted to the Civilian Repair Organisation, and won business repairing Bristol Beaufighters and Bristol Beauforts, in 1944 expanding the Beaufighter work to Stanley Park Aerodrome near Blackpool on the coast west of Samlesbury. Towards the end of the war, activity there also included the parting-out and scrapping of many Hawker Hurricanes and Supermarine Seafires.

In July 1945, two months after the end of war in the European theatre, LAC acquired its first aircraft, a de Havilland DH.89 Dragon Rapide, based it at Stanley Park, and started operating it on scenic flights. The following year it also operated such flights from Yeadon Aerodrome east of Samlesbury in Yorkshire. These were followed by true charter flights, the first of these taking place on 10 February 1946 from Blackpool's other airport, Squires Gate. The fleet quickly grew, with two more DH.89s added early that year and three new Airspeed Consuls joining during the summer, generally operating from Squires Gate. The last recorded flight from Stanley Park was made by LAC's original Rapide, on 21 September.

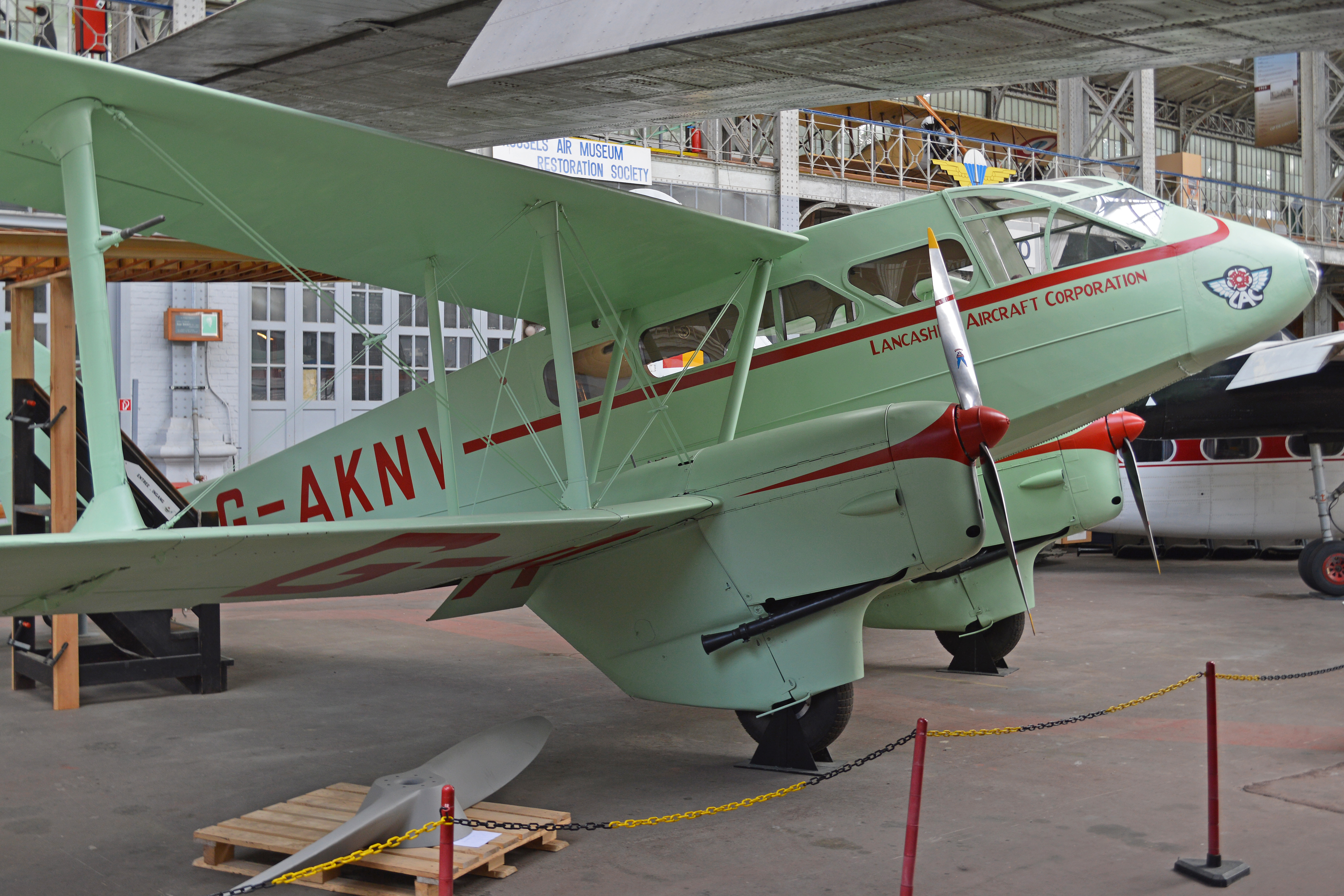
de Havilland Dragon Rapide restored in the airline's standard livery

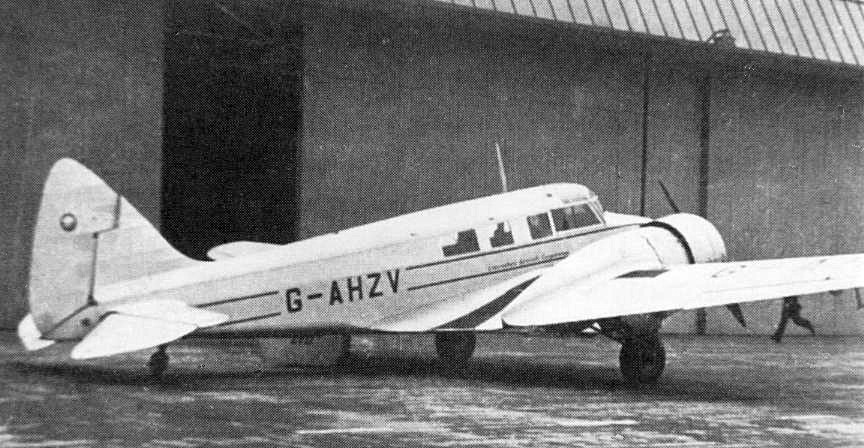
Airspeed Consul, one of LAC's first five aircraft

These aircraft were in great demand during the Blackpool holiday season for pleasure flights and charters to the Isle of Man, but were also used for charters further afield. One Dragon Rapide performed charters to Oslo in Norway and to Southern Rhodesia (now Zimbabwe). LAC incorporated single-engined Percival Proctors and Auster V light aircraft into the fleet, used for pleasure and charter flights along with army cooperation flying, often as targets for anti-aircraft gunnery and radar training.

=== Charter ===
In September 1946 LAC took a big step with the purchase of five Handley Page Halifax C.8 four-engined military transport aircraft from the RAF (more than a third of the 6,000 Halifaxes produced had been manufactured at Samlesbury by English Electric under contract). These were civilianised at LAC's new base at Bovingdon, about 25 miles north-west of London. LAC then used the Halifaxes to commence charter flights from Squires Gate and Bovingdon and would go on to own at least 34 of the type, including the Halton ten-seat passenger variant, until the last were retired in 1953. (This number includes around 15 Halifax C.6 transports which LAC bought only for their spare parts and were never civilianised or used operationally.)

Eric Rylands resurrected the idea to link air services with road travel by coach ("Coach-air" services) in 1947, with Squires Gate as the hub; it proved very successful, with up to 16 rotations per day in peak season, using the Dragon Rapides. LAC operated IT charters from Manchester to Tarbes near Lourdes in southern France, and from London Gatwick Airport. Coach-air services were also operated from Blackpool to Paris (Beauvais) and to Strasbourg. Later in his career Rylands started a similar, even more successful service with Skyways Coach-Air, linking London to Paris.

Also in 1947, the company opened a new passenger terminal at Yeadon, along with engineering facilities known as Yeadon Engineering. Conversion of Halifaxes from military to civil use took place here, and these started to be used for extensive charter flights. These included a charter from Liverpool to New York via Prestwick airport in Scotland, Iceland and Gander in Canada; other flights included destinations such as Johannesburg, Singapore and Sydney. Particularly common were loads of spare parts for the shipping and aviation industries worldwide, perishable foods from Europe and newspaper deliveries to Ireland.

One notable Halifax operation was the airlift of milk from Belfast to England in 1948. Each Halifax could carry 110 churns of milk. The operation involved a total of around 65 round trips per day, but because demand was decreasing, it was stopped in mid-October. There was a second reason for stopping, which was that the aircraft were needed for the Berlin Airlift.

==== Berlin Airlift ====
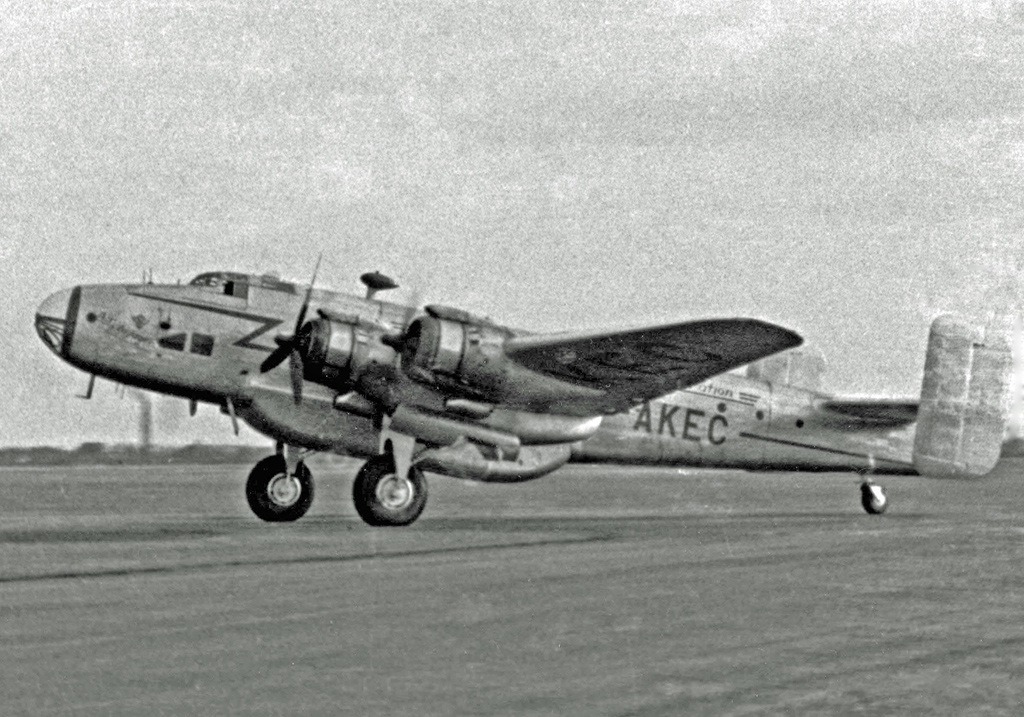
A Halifax C.8 of LAC at Manchester in February 1952

While the large majority of Berlin Airlift operations were conducted by the US and British military, British airlines played an important role, and on 27 July 1948 Flight Refuelling Ltd flew the first civilian flight of the campaign, carrying petrol to Berlin from England in a Avro Lancastrian modified for the purpose. Lancashire Aircraft Corporation was contracted to operate Halton aircraft from RAF Schleswigland in north-western Germany, where an underground fuelling system had been modified by the British Army to allow speedy loading of fuel for faster turnarounds. LAC's first flight into Berlin was on 24 November 1948. Up to 12 Haltons were based at Schleswigland, many of which were already converted as tankers, along with engineering and operations staff.

The Soviets lifted the Blockade on 12 May 1949, and the airlift wound down, with the last civilian flight on 16 August. LAC had performed 2,760 sorties, second only to Flight Refuelling with 4,438, and closely followed by Skyways with 2,749. LAC lost four aircraft in crashes and six of their employees were killed during airlift operations (see Accidents and incidents section below). After this challenging operation the Halifax/Halton fleet was gradually reduced and the last examples were sold or scrapped by 1954.

A notable Halifax in the LAC fleet was a C.8 registered G-AKEC. Named Air Voyager, this was one of the aircraft used for the milk airlift, and completed 159 sorties during the Berlin Airlift. In 1949 it appeared in the British film Stop Press Girl and the following year it operated a regular nightly newspaper run across the Irish Sea between Manchester and Belfast in Northern Ireland. In the same year it took part in the Daily Express International Air Race from Hurn Airport near Bournemouth on the south coast to Herne Bay pier east of London. It came 24th in a field of 75. It was written off while parked at Squires Gate when a storm blew it into LAC Halton G-AHDV on 17 December 1952 (see Accidents and incidents section below).

=== Scheduled operations ===
After WWII, all British domestic scheduled routes were nationalised and made the responsibility of British European Airways (BEA). It operated scheduled flights from Manchester and Yeadon via Blackpool to the Isle of Man. Having struggled to make these routes profitable, in 1948 BEA authorised LAC to take them over. LAC used Dragon Rapides and Consuls on the routes in cooperation with North West Airlines, with whom they shared the Isle of Man route, and took over several more, including London (using RAF Northolt), Birmingham (Elmdon) and Jersey in its network.

==== Routes summer 1952 ====
From a timetable dated April 1952 (in association with BEA)

- Blackpool (Squires Gate) – Isle of Man (IoM) (Ronaldsway) (Friday Saturday Sunday five per day)
- Leeds/Bradford (Yeadon) – IoM (Friday, Sunday one per day. Saturday two per day, IoM – Leeds/Bradford Friday, Saturday one per day, Sunday two per day)
- Leeds/Bradford – Jersey (Friday Saturday Sunday one per day)
- Birmingham (Elmdon) – IoM (Friday Saturday Sunday one per day)

==== Routes summer 1956 ====
From a timetable dated May 1956

- Blackpool (Squires Gate) – IoM (Ronaldsway) (daily up to nine per day, Monday to Thursday four per day)
- Blackpool – Jersey (Friday Saturday Sunday one per day)
- Leeds/Bradford – IoM (Friday Saturday Sunday three per day)
- Leeds/Bradford – Jersey (Friday Saturday Sunday one per day)
- Birmingham (Elmdon) – IoM (Friday Saturday Sunday one per day)

== Eric Rylands Ltd. ==
On 4 March 1949, with his wife Joyce as co-director and secretary, Eric Rylands formed Eric Rylands Ltd. as a holding company, with a registered address in Folkestone (Kent). LAC and Samlesbury Engineering were controlled by the new company. (Note: In 1950 Rylands was chairman of the British Air Charter Association (BACA), which in 1951 was replaced by the British Independent Air Transport Association (BIATA) of which he was also chairman.) In the spring of 1951 David Brown joined Eric Rylands Ltd as chairman, also becoming chairman of LAC and Samlesbury Engineering. Brown was the owner of David Brown Tractors and of Aston Martin (hence the marque's cars' model names starting with DB). He had opened a small airfield at Crosland Moor near Huddersfield.

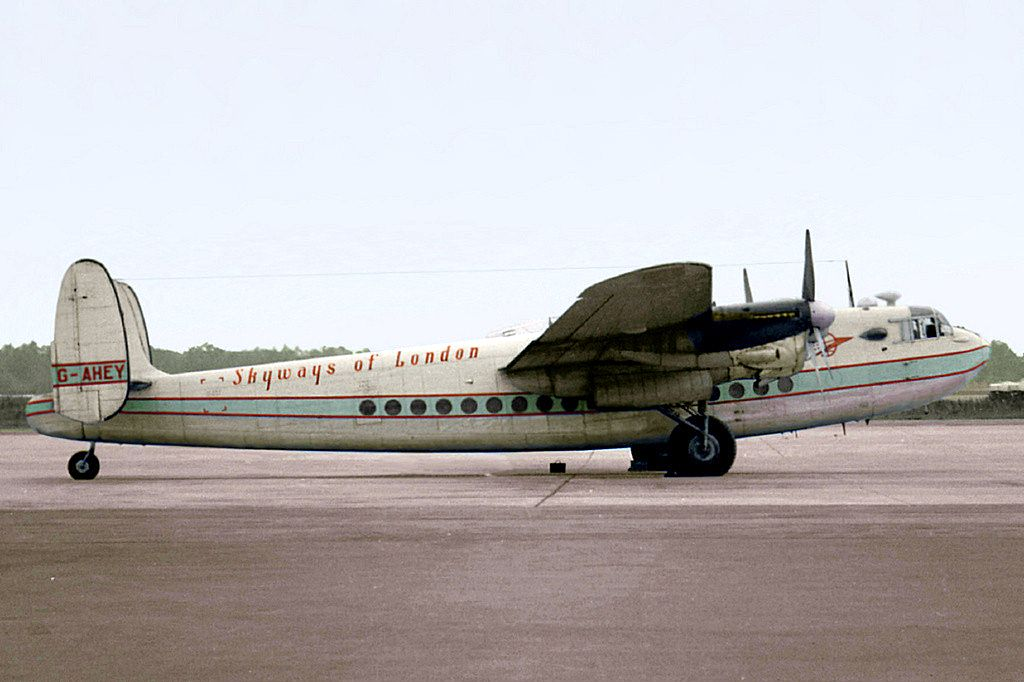
Avro York aircraft after its transfer from LAC to Skyways

During 1951-52 LAC replaced its Halifaxes and Haltons with Avro Yorks, acquiring the entire BOAC fleet of approximately 25 examples. In 1952 LAC bought Skytravel Ltd., a small company that had operated from Speke and Squires Gate in 1946–47. Most of the fleet was auctioned and LAC acquired two Consuls, a de Havilland DH.86 Express and a Miles Aerovan.

== Skyways joins the family ==
More significantly, in 1952 LAC also bought Skyways Ltd. which had been ailing since the Berlin Airlift, and Eric Rylands became its managing director. Skyways' headquarters were temporarily moved to Bovingdon, and later to Stansted Airport. Most of LAC's Yorks were transferred to this new subsidiary and painted in their livery. The remaining Yorks were used for Air Ministry charters, mainly trooping flights to the Caribbean, and for Inclusive Tour (IT) charters. The Yorks could carry up to 50 passengers, so a full coachload could be carried on a single flight for the first time. Scheduled services now started to become less significant to LAC's operations.

In 1952-53 LAC bought four Douglas DC-3s to bolster the scheduled and charter fleet during the steady withdrawal of the Dragon Rapides. In 1954 LAC set up a summer service run in association with East Yorkshire Motor Services, bringing passengers to Blackpool for their service to the Isle of Man.

In 1954 Silver City Airways had left Lympne Airport and moved to its new Lydd Ferryfield Airport. Seeing an opportunity to build on his experience at Blackpool, Rylands leased Lympne and that year used Skyways to establish a coach-air service linking London and Paris, with the Channel crossing flown by DC-3s between Lympne and Beauvais (north of Paris city on the road to Amiens and the location of a sizeable airport). The operation proved very popular; in 1956 Rylands bought Lympne Airport, and in late 1958 he established Skyways Coach-Air Ltd. as a separate subsidiary of Skyways. (Note: At this time Rylands lived in Sellindge, just two miles from Lympne Airport.)

Meanwhile, on 12 December 1956 Rylands sold Lancashire Aircraft Corporation to British Aviation Services (Britavia), the owners of Silver City Airways, but the sale did not include Skyways, the coach-air operation, or Samlesbury Engineering. Rylands himself remained a director of LAC, whose Blackpool operations, along with other Britavia airlines Manx Airlines and Dragon Airways, were merged as the Northern Division of Silver City in early 1957, but the full merger took place in 1958.

Skyways itself survived until 1962, when Euravia bought it for one pound. Skyways Coach-Air collapsed in 1971, and the remains were bought by Dan-Air the following year.

== Fleets ==
=== Aircraft registered to Lancashire Aircraft Corp. ===
Aircraft type	Total	Dates	Remarks
Airspeed Consul	5	1946 – 1956	
Auster V	5	1947 – 1955	
Avro York	25	1951 – 1955	Most passed directly to Skyways
Bristol 170 Mk. 21 Freighter/Wayfarer	2	1957 – 1958	
de Havilland DH.86 Express	1	1951 – 1957	
de Havilland DH.89A Dragon Rapide	19	1945 – 1957	
Douglas DC-3	5	1952 – 1957	Including one leased in (G-AMRA)
Handley Page Halifax/Halton	34	1946 – 1953	Including many used only for spares
Miles Aerovan 3	1	1951 – 1953	
Percival Proctor	7	1947 – 1954	

The airline's livery was pale green overall with red trim and lettering.

=== Aircraft registered to Eric Rylands Ltd. ===
Aircraft type	Number	In	Disposed	Remarks
Auster Aiglet Trainer	1	31 March 1955	14 May 1957	Transferred to Skyways then Skyways Coach Air
Avro XIX	1	25 July 1961	18 October 1967	To Ekco Electronics, now at Avro Heritage Museum

== Major accidents and incidents ==
- 5 June 1947 - Halifax C.8 made a very hard night landing at London Heathrow Airport after a flight carrying six tons of apricots from Valencia (Spain). The fuselage was buckled and the aircraft written off. There were no casualties.
- 5 December 1947 - Halifax C.8 crashed into high ground near Rhyl (Denbighshire), on a cargo flight from Lille (France), to Liverpool Speke Airport. All four crew were killed.
- 3 September 1948 - Halifax C.8 overran the runway on landing at Squires Gate after a cargo flight from Bovingdon. The aircraft was written off and there were no injuries among the three crew.
- 21 March 1949 - Halifax C.8 flew a too low approach and crashed short of the runway at Schleswigland, Germany after a cargo flight from Berlin's Tempelhof Airport. Three crew were killed and one injured.
- 1 June 1949 - Halifax C.8 was written off after an unexplained crash at Berlin Tegel Airport after a cargo flight from Schleswigland. All four crew suffered slight injuries.
- 6 July 1949 - Halifax C.8 was written off at Schleswigland (Germany) when the undercarriage failed to retract after take-off and then collapsed on landing on its return. None of the three crew were injured.
- 28 December 1949 - Halifax C.8 was damaged beyond repair in a taxiing accident at Paris–Le Bourget Airport. No casualties.
- 25 October 1950 - Airspeed Consul was withdrawn from use after an undercarriage collapse on landing at Seaton Carew (West Hartlepool - County Durham). Neither occupant was injured.
- 8 March 1951 - Halifax C.8 crashed on approach to RAF Bovingdon after a flight from Torslanda Airport (Gothenburg - Sweden), with a cargo of frozen reindeer carcases. All four crew were killed. Icing may have been the cause.
- 12 December 1952 - A Halton and a Halifax C.8 were written off at Squires Gate airport after strong winds blew one into the other while they were both parked. No one was hurt.

== Samlesbury Engineering ==
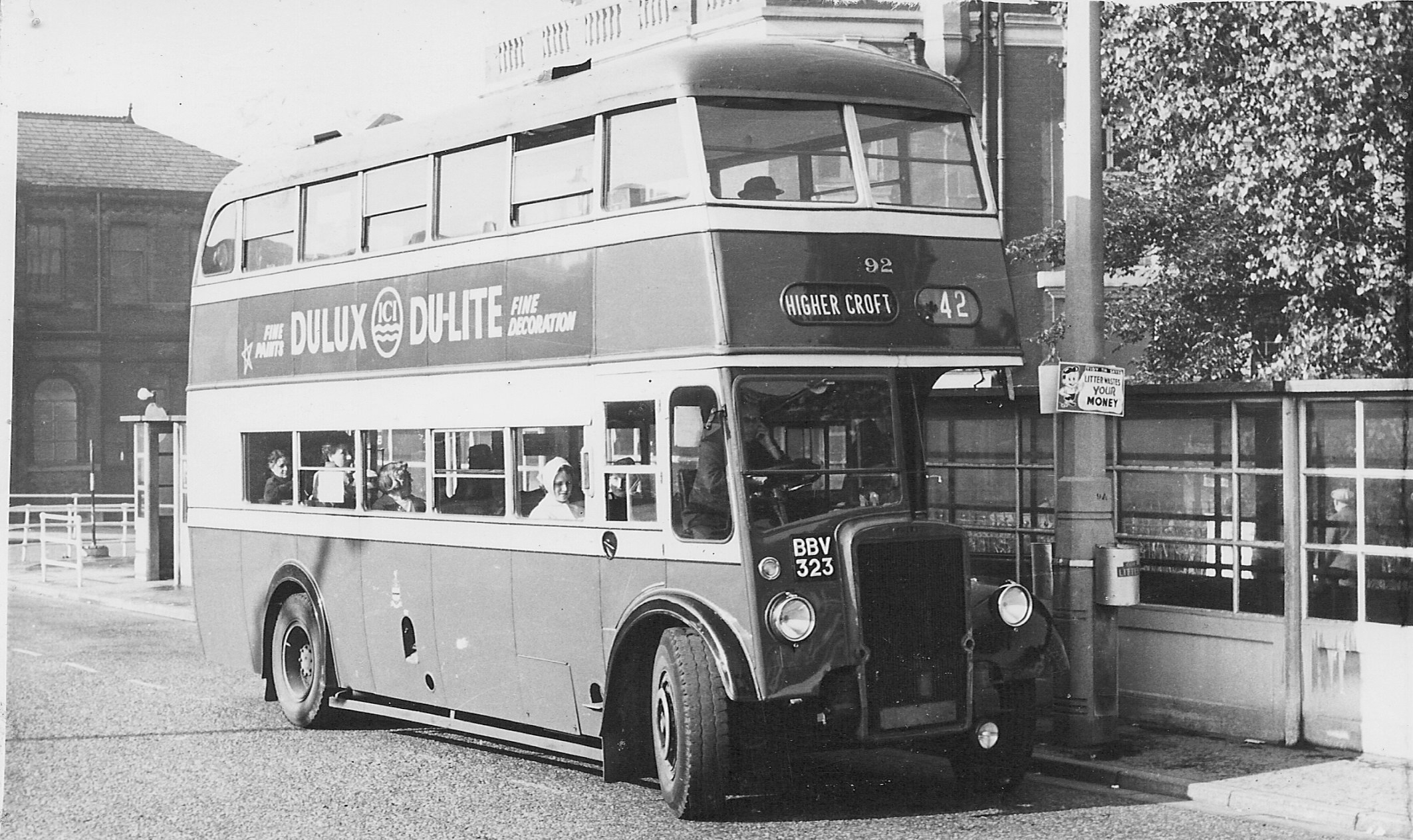
A Leyland Titan PD1 double-decker bus with a Samlesbury Engineering body

After WWII Samlesbury Engineering had remained in the aviation business, occupying hangars at Samlesbury where English Electric had built 2,145 Halifaxes, and had diversified into building and rebuilding buses, including trolleybuses, and coaches – its proximity to Leyland Motors (around 10 miles) was probably a factor in this decision.

After its intense activity, especially converting, maintaining and repairing Halifaxes during the Berlin Airlift, the workload decreased, and its outposts away from its home base were closed or taken over by other organisations. At Samlesbury the company had returned its main hangars to English Electric and set up in smaller premises on the other side of the airfield, previously occupied by Burnley Aircraft Products, (Note: Burnley Aircraft Products repaired Bristol Beauforts and Bristol Beaufighters at Samlesbury during the war. Some of the Beaufighters were fitted with highly-classified airborne radar sets.) where it continued to produce aircraft components, for the Vickers Viscount for example, and had also turned to building ambulance, van, and trailer bodies.

With its specialist aviation and vehicle experience, in 1954 it built the turbojet-powered Bluebird K7, a hydroplane used by Donald Campbell for his water speed record runs.

An experiment with frameless reinforced glassfibre road haulage containers in the early 1960s apparently came to nothing. The vehicle building part of the business was separated from the aviation side and, renamed Samlesbury Engineering (1961) Ltd., was taken over by The British Trailer Co. Ltd. Around that time, the remains of Samlesbury Engineering were absorbed into British Aircraft Corporation.

== Lancashire Aircraft Company ==
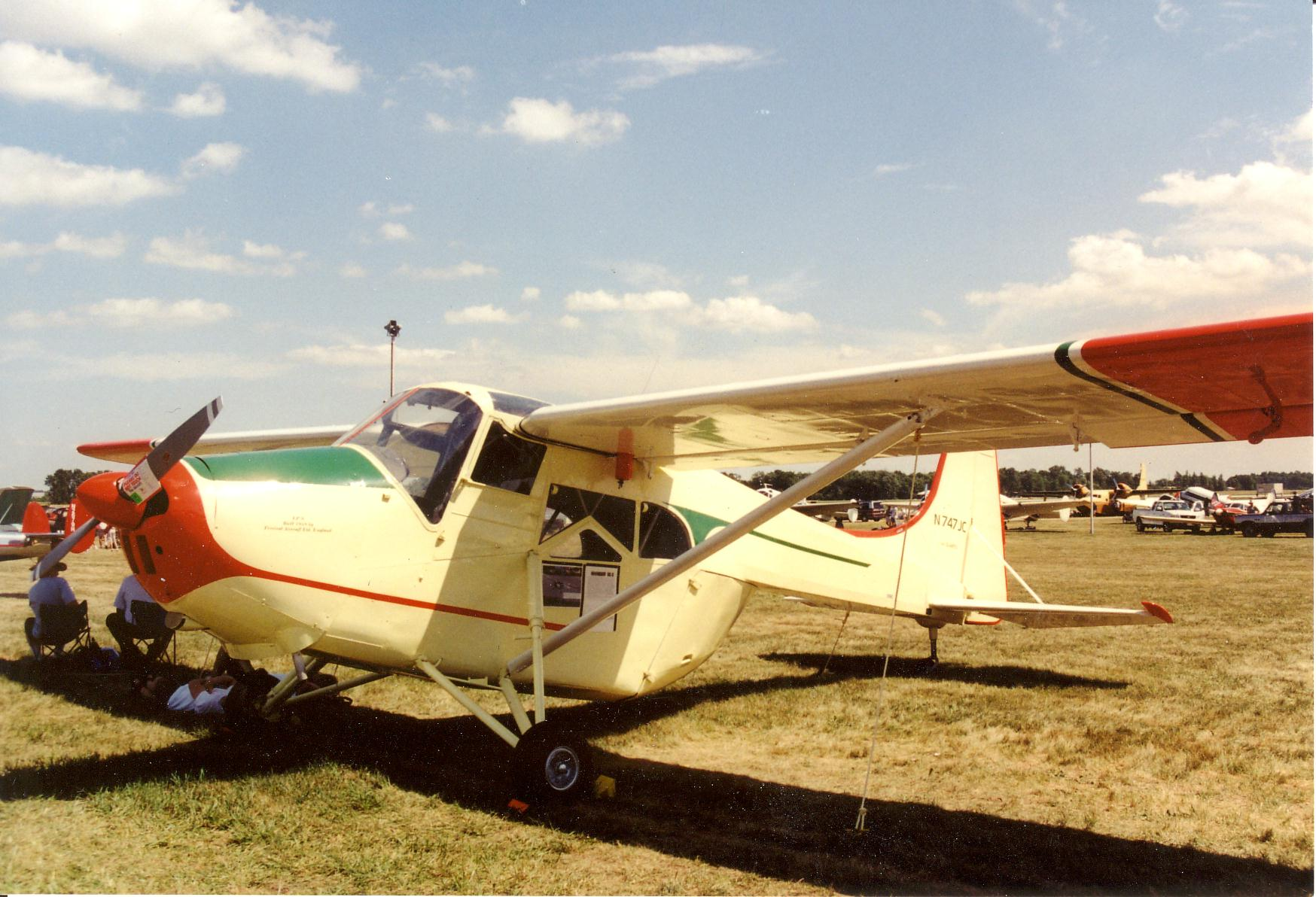
Edgar Percival E.P.9

In October 1958 Samlesbury Engineering formed a subsidiary named in memory of its parent's recently closed sibling, Lancashire Aircraft Company Ltd. The directors were Eric Rylands (chairman), Sir Wavell Wakefield and David Gaunt.

Lancashire Aircraft Company had been created to continue the development and production of the Edgar Percival E.P.9 utility aircraft, which had been bought from Edgar Percival himself. In addition to the rights to the design, the sale included two complete aircraft, seven unfinished airframes and the production jigs from Percival's factory at Stapleford Aerodrome in Essex.

At first the operation was set up at Squires Gate, but in 1960 it was moved to Samlesbury Aerodrome.

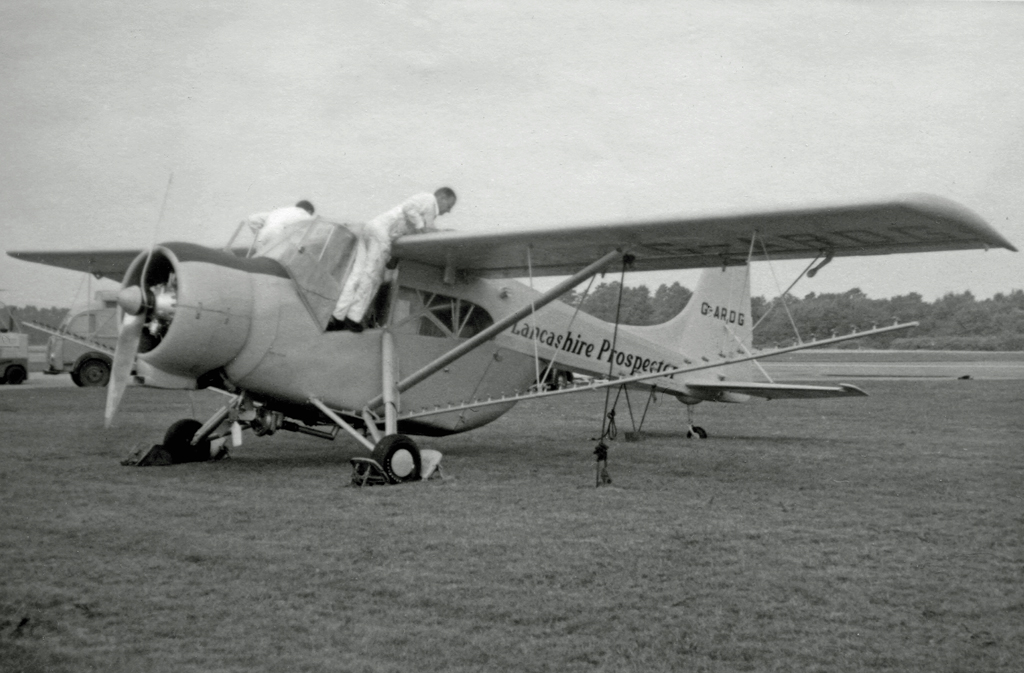
The sole Lancashire Prospector Mk. 2, G-ARDG, at the 1960 Farnborough Airshow, fitted with spray bars.

The company developed the design, replacing the E.P.9's 270 hp (200 kW) Lycoming GO-480 engine with a 295 hp (220 kW) version driving a three-bladed propeller, and named it the Lancashire Aircraft Prospector. (Note: Edgar Percival called the aircraft E.P.9 and EP.9, Lancashire Aircraft Company only used the name Prospector, but the UK CAA registration details give it as "Prospector E.P.9".) Only five airframes were completed, plus a single example of a Mk. 2 version with a 375 hp (280 kW) Armstrong Siddeley Cheetah radial engine, which first flew in August 1960. (Some say that the Mk. 2 was only produced to allow the aircraft to attend that year's SBAC Farnborough Airshow, because it otherwise would have been disqualified for having a foreign (American) engine.)

A Prospector was displayed alongside a Skyways Coach-Air Avro 748 at the 1963 Biggin Hill Air Fair.

No further orders were forthcoming, and production stopped in 1961. In 1963 Lancashire Aircraft Company moved to Ryland's airport at Lympne, (Note: The UK CAA register entry for G-AOZO demonstrates the Prospector's history, starting at Stapleford and moving via Squires Gate and Samlesbury to Lympne.) where it ran a small maintenance and repair operation specialising in the Prospectors, but it had closed down completely by 1964.

=== Prospector production list ===
Percival's construction numbers started at 20. Aircraft with c/n 41 onwards were completed by Lancashire Aircraft Company.

C/n	First Registration	Remarks
29	G-AOZO	E.P.9 sold to Lancashire Aircraft Company complete, became the prototype Prospector
35	G-APLP	E.P.9 sold to Lancashire Aircraft Company complete. Converted to Prospector July 1959, written off the same month after forced landing on Blackpool beach
41	G-APWX	To USA
42	G-APWZ	To New Zealand
43	G-APXW	In Army Flying Museum, Middle Wallop, UK
44	G-ARLE	To Sudan
45		Not completed
46	VH-SSR	To Australia
47	G-ARDG	Mk. 2 prototype; withdrawn from use 1964, some parts used to complete G-APXW at Army Flying Museum

== See also ==
- List of defunct airlines of the United Kingdom
